= Historical buildings and structures of Yarmouth, Maine =

The historical buildings and structures of Yarmouth, Maine, represent a variety of building styles and usages, largely based on its past as home to almost sixty mills over a period of roughly 250 years. These mills include that of grain, lumber, pulp and cotton. Additionally, almost three hundred vessels were launched by Yarmouth's shipyards in the century between 1790 and 1890, and the homes of master shipwrights and ship captains can still be found throughout the town.

Yarmouth's 2010 Comprehensive Plan identified "historic character" as one of five key topics facing the town. The plan proposed policies and strategies to ensure that "buildings of historic significance will be maintained while allowing the buildings to be improved, modernized and expanded."

In 2017, after the formation of a Historic Resources Steering Committee, the town hired historic building consultant Margaret Gaertner to conduct a historic architectural survey of the Village area of Yarmouth. This was completed in September 2018.

The Maine Historic Preservation Commission has found many of Yarmouth's historic buildings eligible for listing on the National Register of Historic Places, in addition to the twelve that are already included.

In December 2017, the first phase of a "reconnaissance-level architectural survey" of the town's "village core" was commissioned by its Department of Planning & Development. The surveyed of 547 properties and 773 structures, across 773 acres (313 ha), included houses, barns, churches, bridges, dams "and objects such as memorials and water troughs."

In 2019, the town began to develop a historic preservation ordinance, with proposed historic district boundaries, regulations and guidelines. The three potential historic districts that were recommended were Upper Village, Lower Falls and Royal River Manufacturing Company. A Preservation Plan was published in 2020.

A 2021 Historic Preservation Advisory Ordinance identified ten Local Historic Landmarks, three Historic Districts and three Historic Objects. Many are located in the Gilman Road and Pleasant Street areas, which leads to the possibility of it being a future historic district.

== National Register of Historic Places ==
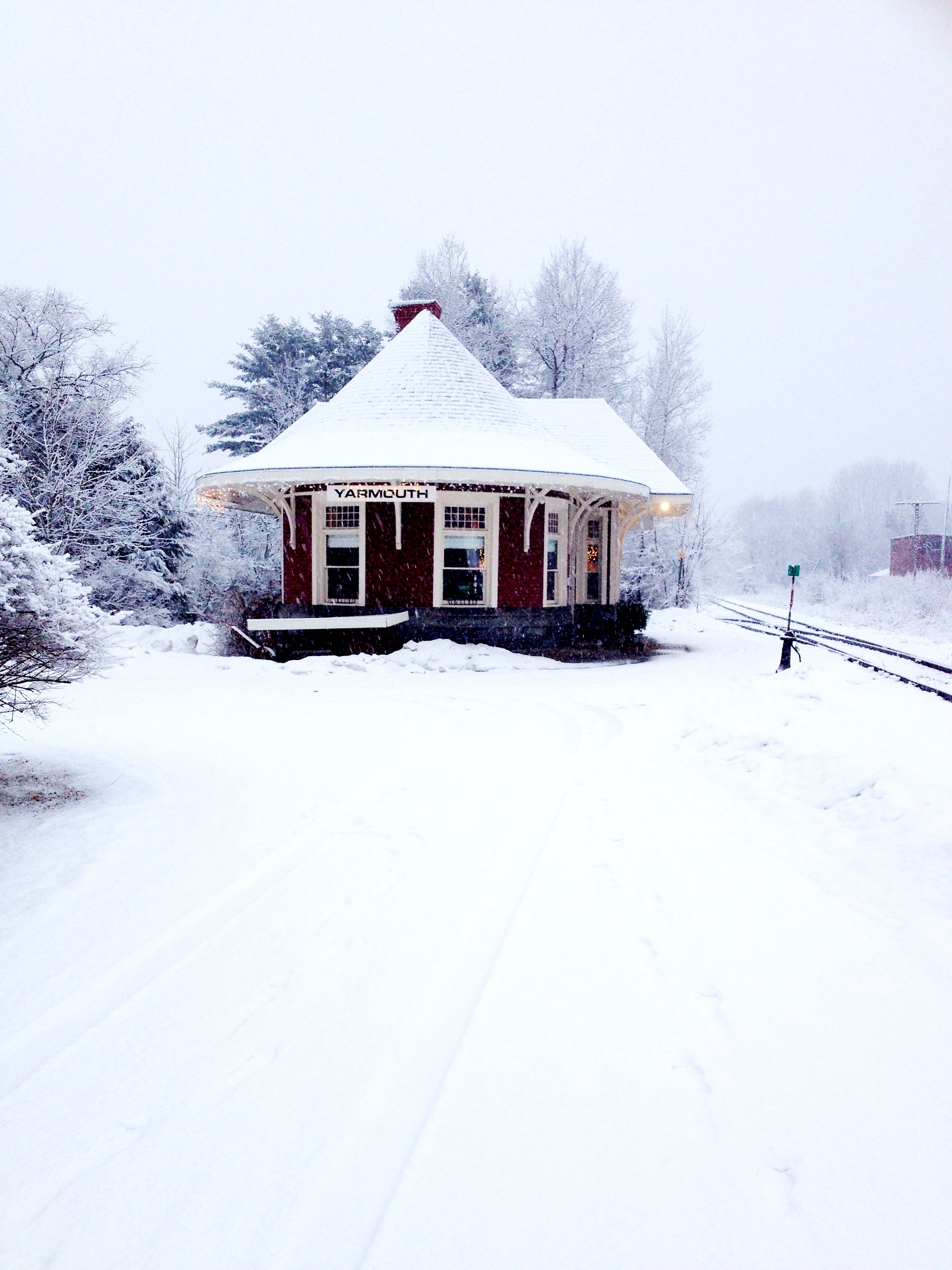
Main Street's Grand Trunk Railway Station, built in 1906

In 2018, Yarmouth adopted a Demolition Delay ordinance, which prohibits demolition of properties on, or eligible for listing on, the National Register of Historic Places. Twelve properties in Yarmouth are currently listed on the Register. The oldest (the Cushing and Hannah Prince House) dates from 1785; the "newest" (the Grand Trunk Station) was built in 1906, replacing a structure built in 1848. They are ranked in order of construction below.

- Cushing and Hannah Prince House (built in 1785), 189 Greely Road
- North Yarmouth and Freeport Baptist Meeting House (1796), 3 Hillside Street
- Ammi Mitchell House (c. 1800), 333 Main Street
- Russell Hall (1841), North Yarmouth Academy, 141 Main Street
- Academy Hall (1847), North Yarmouth Academy, 129 Main Street
- Captain S. C. Blanchard House (1855), 317 Main Street
- Captain Reuben Merrill House (1858), 233 West Main Street
- First Universalist Church (1859), 97 Main Street
- First Parish Congregational Church (1867), 116 Main Street
- Camp Hammond (1889), 275 Main Street
- Cousins Island Chapel (1895), 414 Cousins Street
- Grand Trunk Station (1906), 288 Main Street

In 2018, a further 46 properties older than fifty years were identified as being potentially eligible for individual listing.

== Lower Falls ==
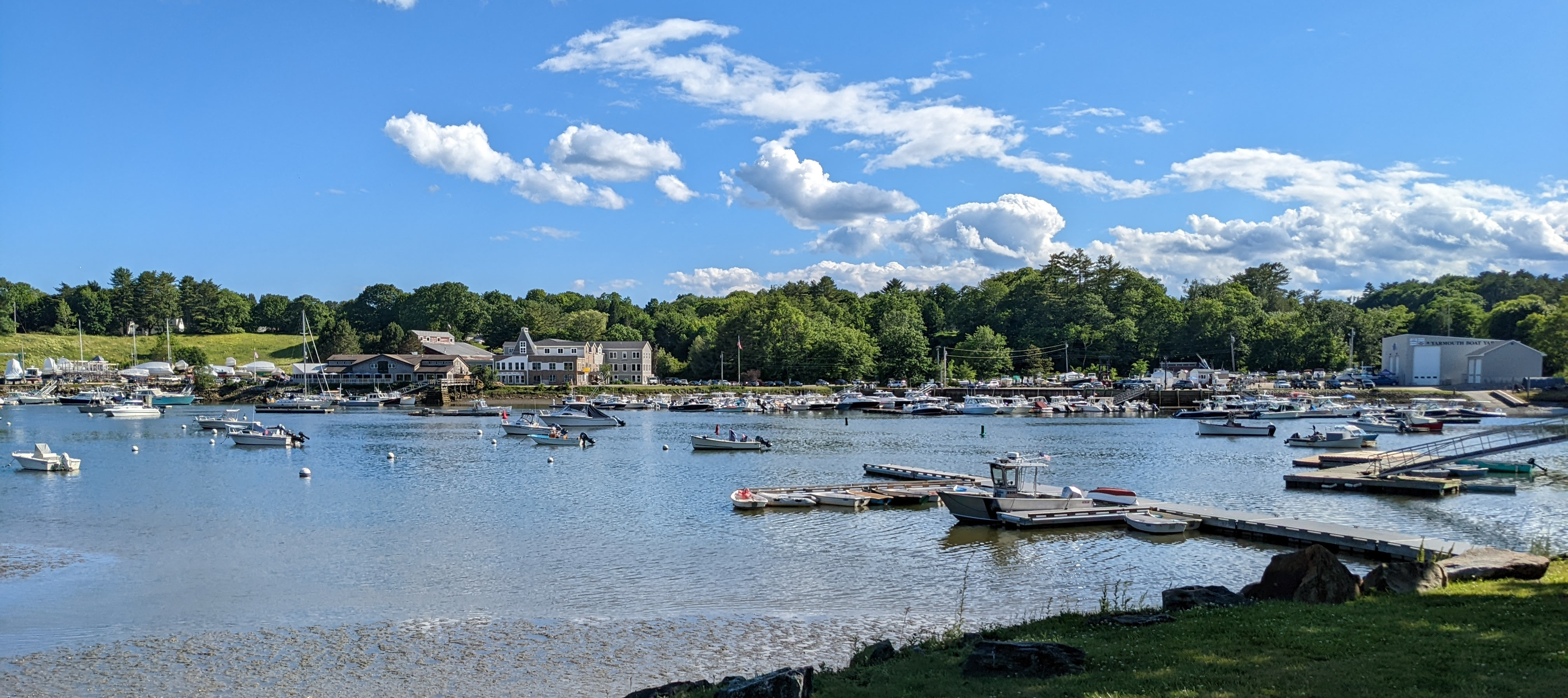
Yarmouth's marina in 2022, looking south

Also known as Falls Village or The Falls, Lower Falls (named for the nearby First Falls) was the location of several mills from the 17th century onward, while—on the southern side of today's East Main Street Bridge—was Yarmouth's harbor, where many hundreds of ships were built and launched in the century between 1790 and 1890.

=== Lafayette Street ===
State Route 88 becomes Lafayette Street at the Cumberland Foreside and Yarmouth town line. It was originally known as Atlantic Highway.

28 Lafayette Street, which stands beside the stone marker honoring Walter Gendall, was built in 1750.

Across the street at number 33, (William) Reed's Machine Shop was built in 1952, the business having moved here from East Elm Street and Leighton Street. It has been owned since 1973 by Stephen Welch. Alex Mansfield's Garage formerly stood at the location.

=== Pleasant Street ===
Connects to Lafayette Street at the top and bottom of its hill above the harbor.

=== Marina Road ===
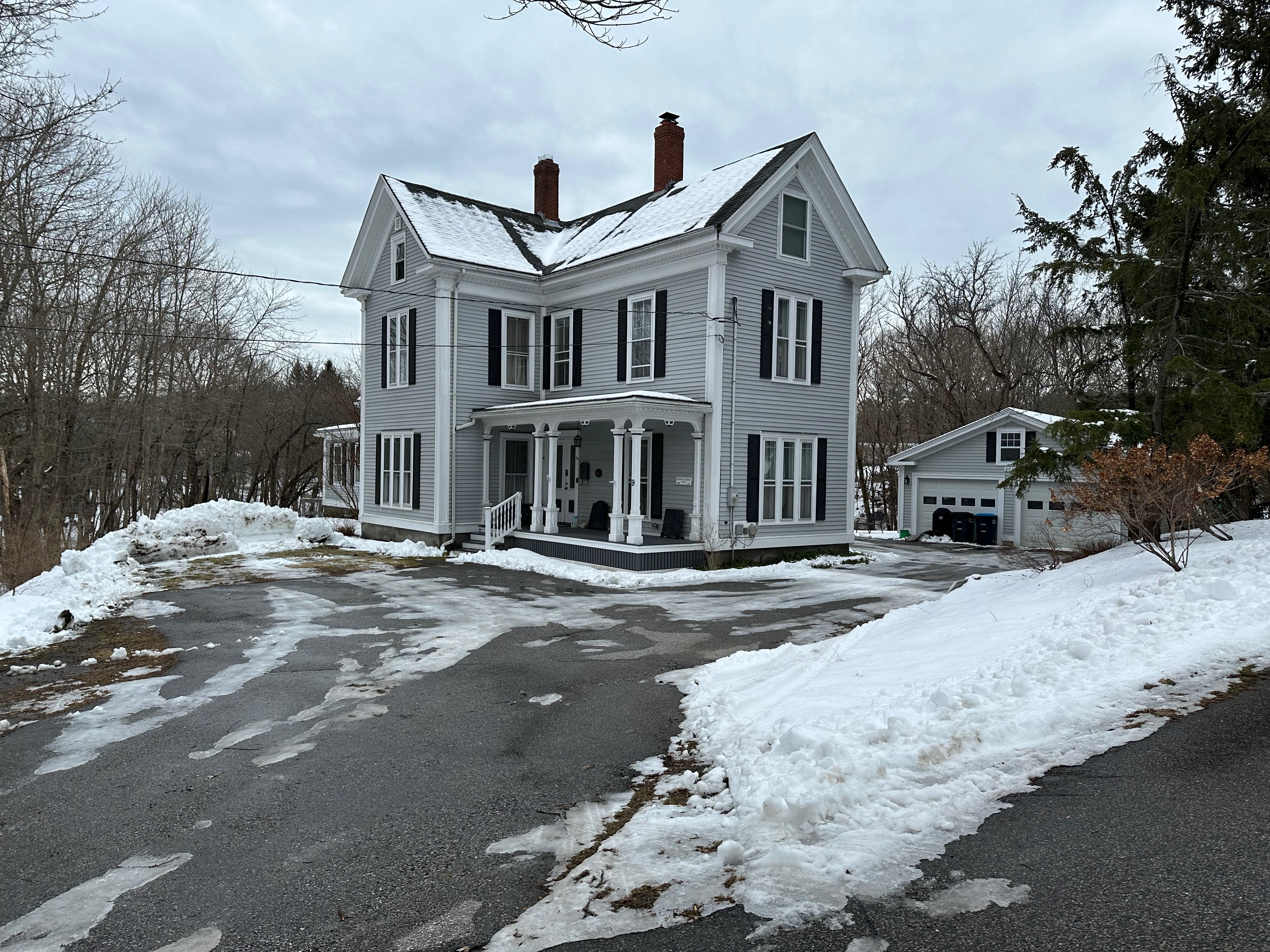
9 Marina Road (built in 1890)

Marina Road is the right-hand turn at the Staples Hill split with Main Street. It was one of the two access roads to the harbor from the village.

Original owner Peter Allen tore down the Hannah Russell House at 3 Marina Road and built the current structure in 1881. Until 2018 it was home to the business Women to Women.

Herman Seabury, a shipyard foreman, was the original owner of 9 Marina Road in 1890. It remained in his family for sixty years.

Number 22 is believed to date from around 1800. Number 36 was built around 1840.

The last building on Marina Road before the Lafayette Street intersection is number 59. Built in 1900 by Harry Dean as a tearoom, it later became a shoe-repair shop, an antique store and an office. It is, as of 2023, a nutritionist business.

=== Main Street ===
Maine State Route 115 for the entirety of its route through Yarmouth, it is home to a mix of homes and businesses. North Yarmouth Academy is located on both sides of the street's mid-section.

=== Portland Street ===
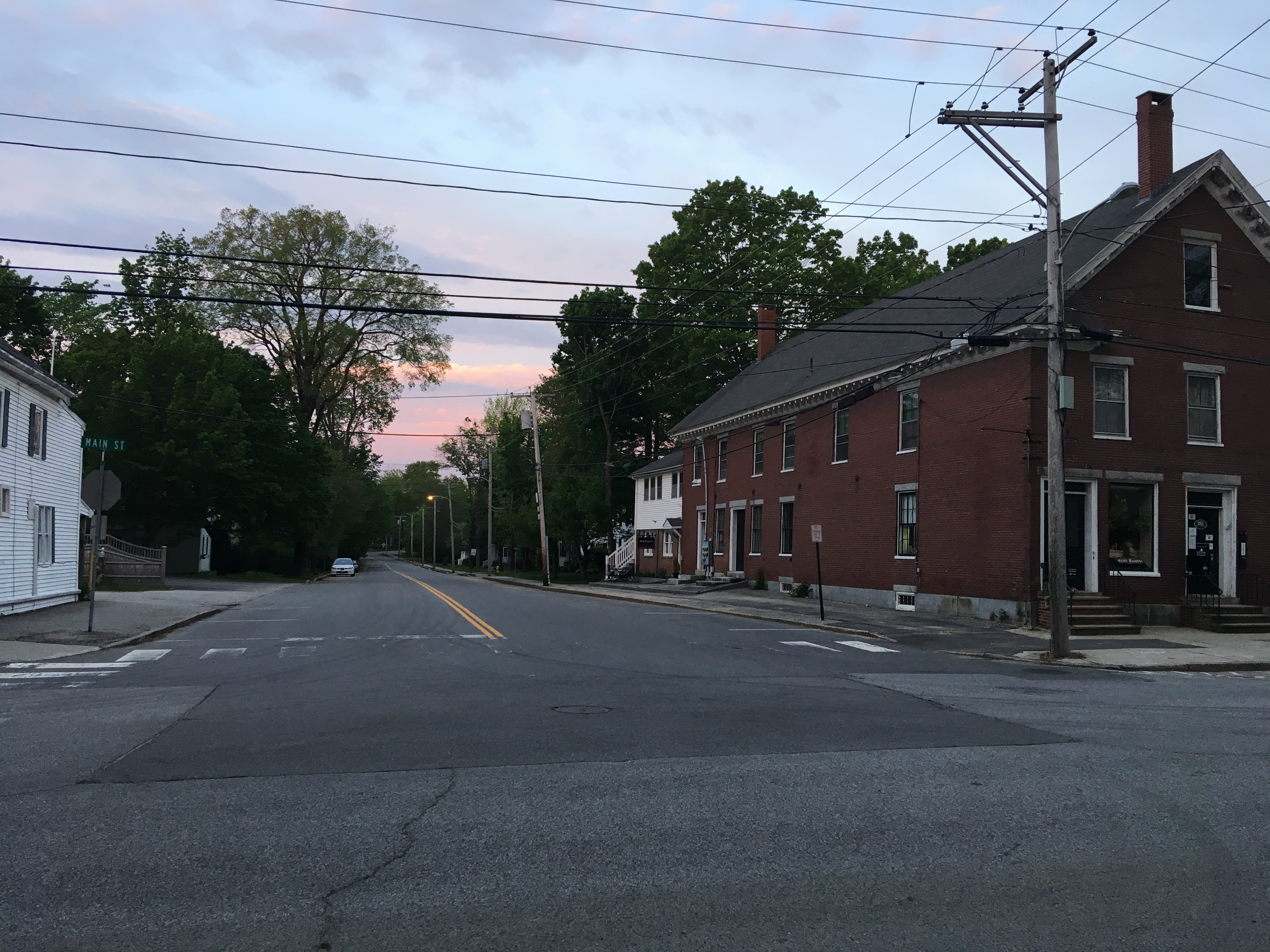
The northern end of Portland Street, at its intersection with Main Street, in 2007

The northern (village) end of the street is the historic part. As its name implies, the southern section, across Route 1, eventually leads to Portland, the largest city in Maine. After around 0.72 miles (1.16 km), it reaches an intersection with Elm Street, the earlier route into the city.

=== Storer Street ===
Off the northern end of Portland Street, Storer Street runs behind the First Parish Church. It is named for Ammi Storer, who was the first to run a business in the brick building at the corner, next to the church.

Number 23 was originally the home of papermaker William Hawes in 1850. The house was moved from Main Street around 1867, when the church was built.

=== High Street ===
High Street, a cul-de-sac, is off the northern section of Portland Street. Rocky Hill Road runs from the end of High down to Marina Road.

Shipbuilder Elbridge Hutchins lived at 5 High Street, which was built in 1900.

73 High Street, built in 1868, was the home of John R. Gooding.

85 High Street was built by Solomon Sawyer in 1877 and remained in his family until 1984.

=== Bridge Street ===
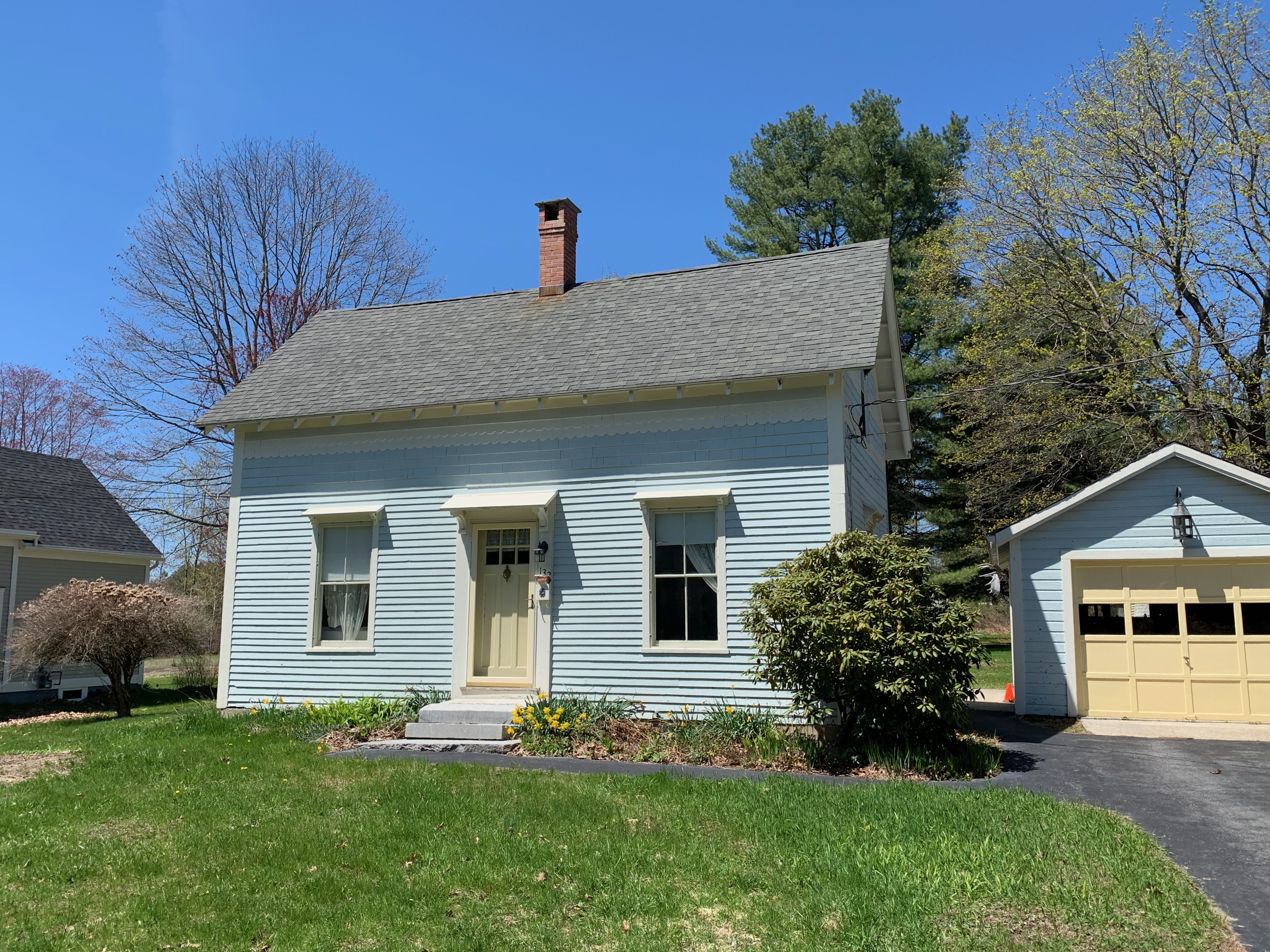
This house, at number 132 Bridge Street, was built in 1870 and has its "integrity intact", according to a surveyor

Bridge Street crosses the Second Falls at the Sparhawk Mill. It connects to Main Street to the south and Willow Street to the north.

=== School Street ===
School Street, which runs beside and behind Merrill Memorial Library, takes the motorist on and off Route 1 South, as well as providing access to the William H. Rowe School.

In 1889, Dr. Herbert A. Merrill had a dental practice in the rear of his house, built four years earlier, in Brickyard Hollow on Main Street. It has since been moved to 26 School Street. It is the building now occupied by InSight Eyecare on the InterMed campus.

=== York Street ===
York Street takes the motorist on and off Route 1 North.

Number 17 dates to around 1852, while number 22 was built around 1850.

== Brickyard Hollow ==
The section of town between the Upper Village and Lower Falls was known as Brickyard Hollow, named for the brick-making business that was located across the street from the Masonic Hall (now the restaurant Gather) at 189 Main Street, which was built in the 1870s. A muddy valley up until the beginning of the 20th century, the area was eventually reclaimed as a civic center by the laying down of a two-foot layer of black ash, from Forest Paper Company, to level it out.

=== Main Street ===
The middle section of the Main Street, located between Lower Falls and Upper Village.

== Upper Village ==
Upper Village is the section of town between Brickyard Hollow to the east and Main Street's intersection with Elm Street to the west.

=== Main Street ===
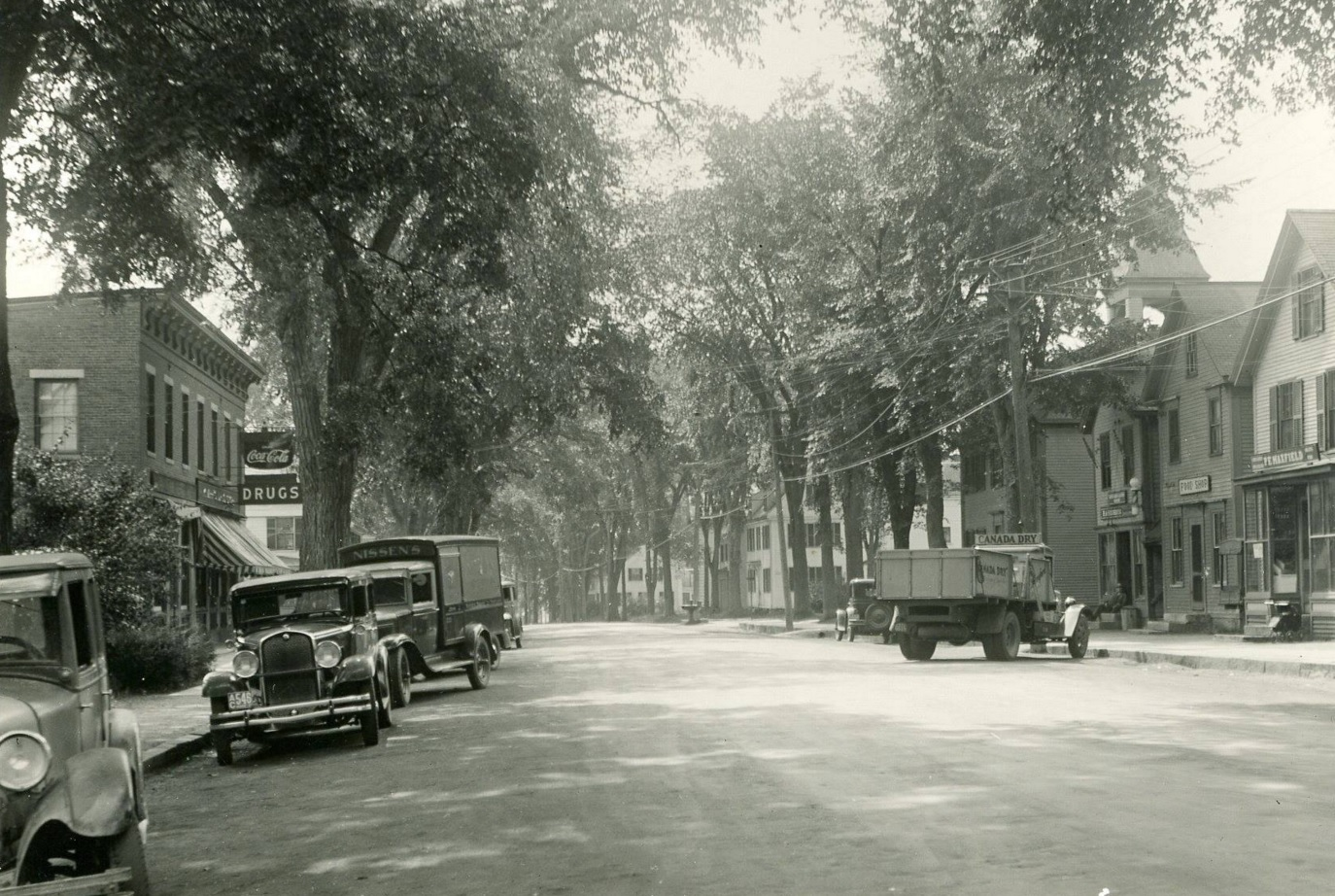
Main Street in 1947, looking back towards the center of town

In contrast to today, people who lived near "the Corner" of Elm and Main Streets in the 19th century would not think of shopping at the Lower Falls end of the latter thoroughfare. For over 150 years, much of the retail activity in the Upper Village occurred in the area of the Brick Store at 357 Main Street. Some of the oldest buildings on Main Street are those on its southern side, clustered between the Catholic and Baptist churches. The Daniel Wallis House at 330 Main Street, for example, was built around 1810. Around the middle of the 19th century, Captain Cushing Prince Jr. (1786–1869) moved here from his historic house on Greely Road which he inherited from his father, Cushing Prince (1745–1827).

=== Baker Street ===
Baker Street, near the North Yarmouth and Freeport Baptist Meetinghouse, connects Church and Cumberland Streets.

Number 22, a cape with a central chimney, is believed to have been moved from near 233 West Main Street. It was on its current site by 1859.

Number 40 dates to 1850. It is the former home of John L. Lovell.

Number 45 was moved from the corner of Main and East Elm around 1890. It was built at its original home in 1825.

=== Center Street ===
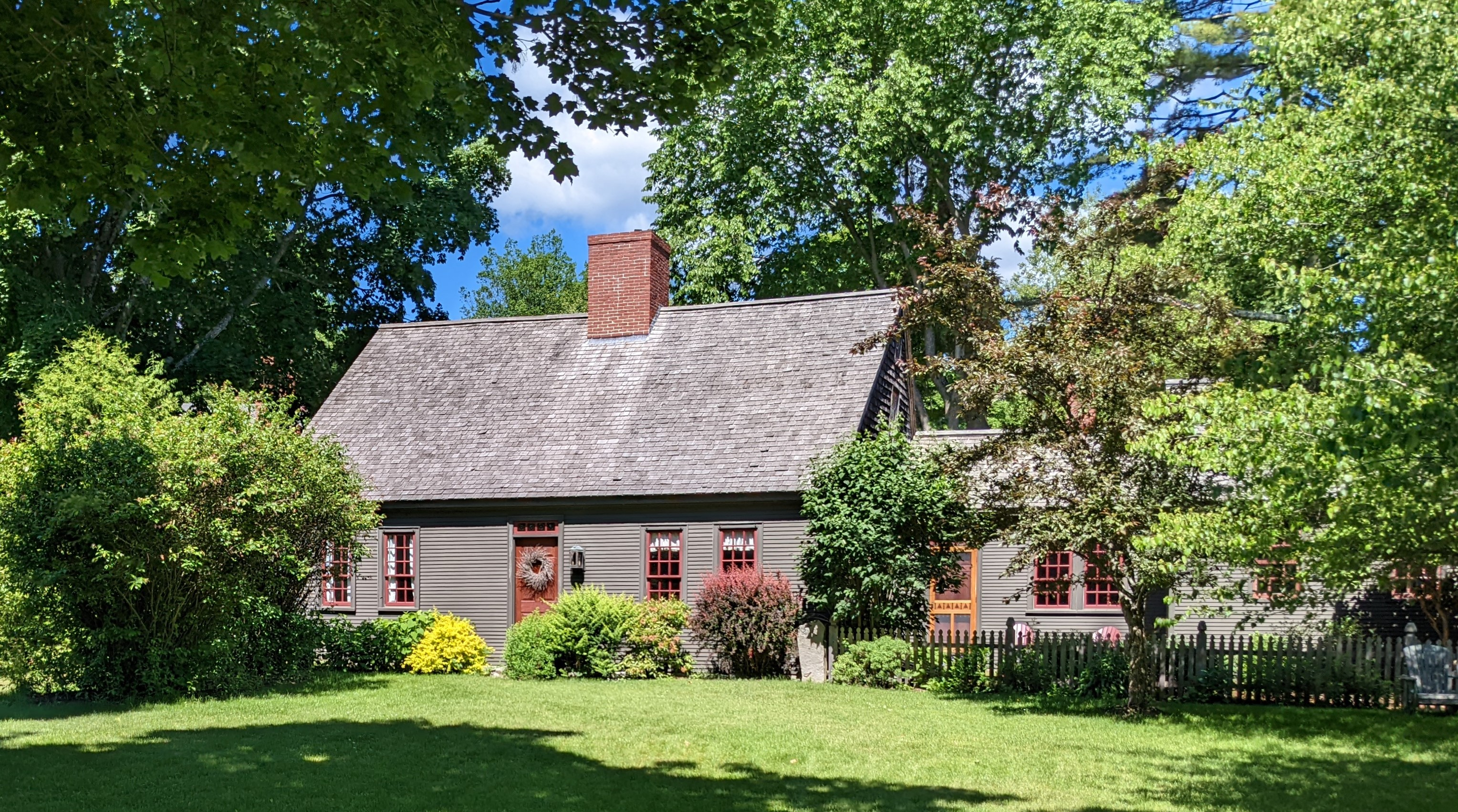
This circa-1785 home stands at 33 Center Street. It was originally the home of Dr. Ammi Mitchell

Center Street is off the southern side of Main Street and connects to Cumberland Street. It was formerly known as Woodbury's Lane.

Another barber shop, Larry's, stood on Center Street.

20 Center Street is the home of Winslow Station, which served as the town's only fire station from 1953 until the mid-1990s. It was used by the fire department until 2004. The building, which was constructed in 1930, is dedicated to Carl Henry Winslow, who was the fire chief for seventeen of the forty-four years he was in its ranks.

32 Center Street, a brick side-hall Greek Revival, was the home of Captain Samuel Baker circa 1850.

The circa-1785 home of Dr. Ammi Ruhamah Mitchell stands at 33 Center Street.

Charles W. Jordan lived at 45 Center Street, while 65 Center Street was the home of Edward H. Smith.

=== Church Street ===
The Old John Corliss House, at 35 Church Street, dates from 1800

Formerly known as Baptist Street, Church Street runs between West Elm Street and Hillside Street, ending across from the Baptist Meetinghouse.

=== Cumberland Street ===
Cumberland Street runs between South Street and Hillside Street, crossing West Elm Street en route.

Captain Joseph Bucknam lived at 3 Cumberland Street, a home built by Jeremiah Loring in 1847.

A Catholic church was built on Cumberland Street in 1879. The location was chosen out of fear that it would be vandalized if it was built on Main Street, for Yarmouth was a predominantly Protestant town at the time. The structure still stands as a private home, having moved to 73–75 Cumberland Street, but it is turned sideways to the street.

=== East Elm Street ===
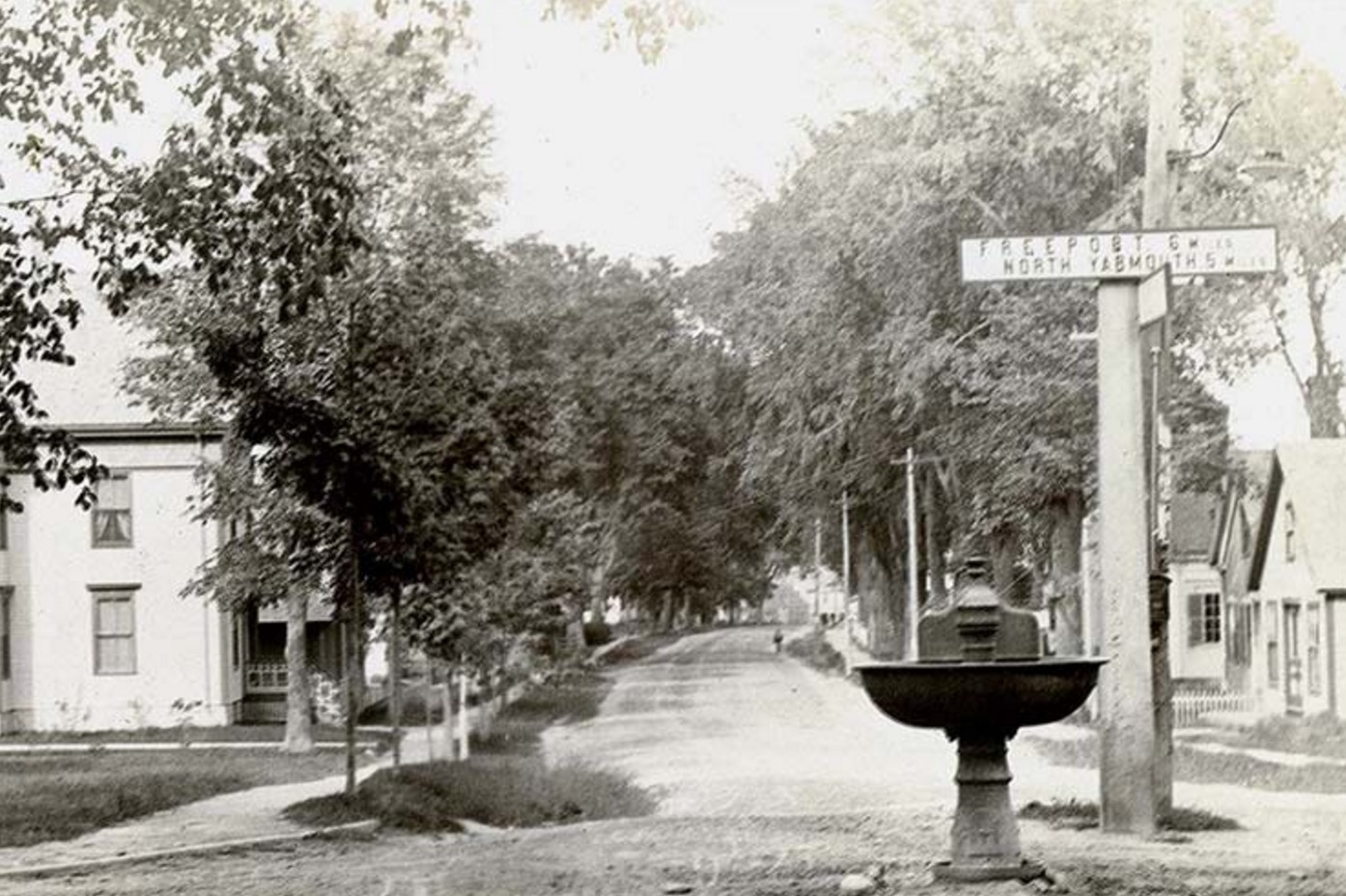
East Elm Street, from its junction with Main Street. The horse trough in view here now stands at the intersection of Main and Center Streets

East Elm Street (formerly known as Gooches' Lane) leads to North Road. It crosses the Royal River at the park just beyond the Fourth Falls and passes Yarmouth Junction at Depot Road.

=== Hillside Street ===
Formerly known as Brimstone Hill or Byram's Hill, the Baptist Meeting House stands at the crest of Hillside Street. One of the longest minor roads in Yarmouth, at 1.5 miles (2.4 km), it connects West Main Street to Greely Road in Cumberland.

48 Hillside was built in 1858, according to one source, while another places it closer to the turn of the century.

Number 58, built around 1849, was the home of Patrick Haney.

=== Mill Street ===
Not to be confused with an early name for East Elm Street, today's incarnation used to be the main access road to the Forest Paper Company at the Third Falls.

Henry Caswell, a blacksmith, lived at the brick number 31 Mill Street, across the St. Lawrence and Atlantic Railroad (then the Grand Trunk Railway). His business was directly across the street on what is now greenspace. The house was later owned by the Forest Paper Company for fifty years.

=== South Street ===
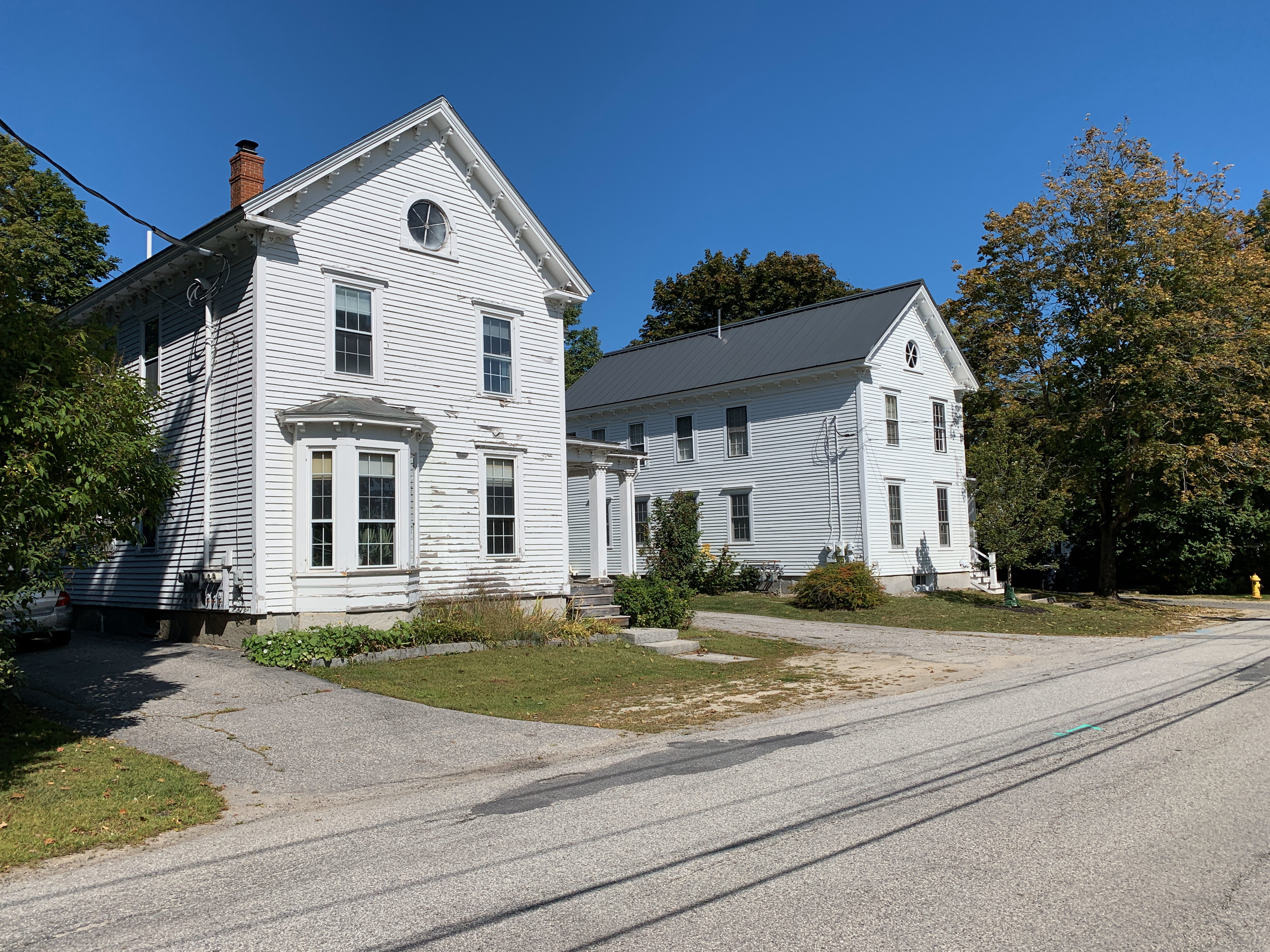
37 and 33 South Street. The buildings were originally built connected to each other but were later separated

South Street is off the southern side of Main Street and connects to West Elm Street, either directly or via Cumberland Street. It was designed in 1848 as part of the town's first modern housing development. Farmland was given over to house lots and sold to merchants and sea captains, including Perez Nathaniel Blanchard and Ansel Loring.

1 South Street, the former home of Dr. Nat Barker, was built in 1840. He lived there with his wife, Catherine, in the 1930s and 1940s.

10 South Street was formerly Alec Mansfield's garage.

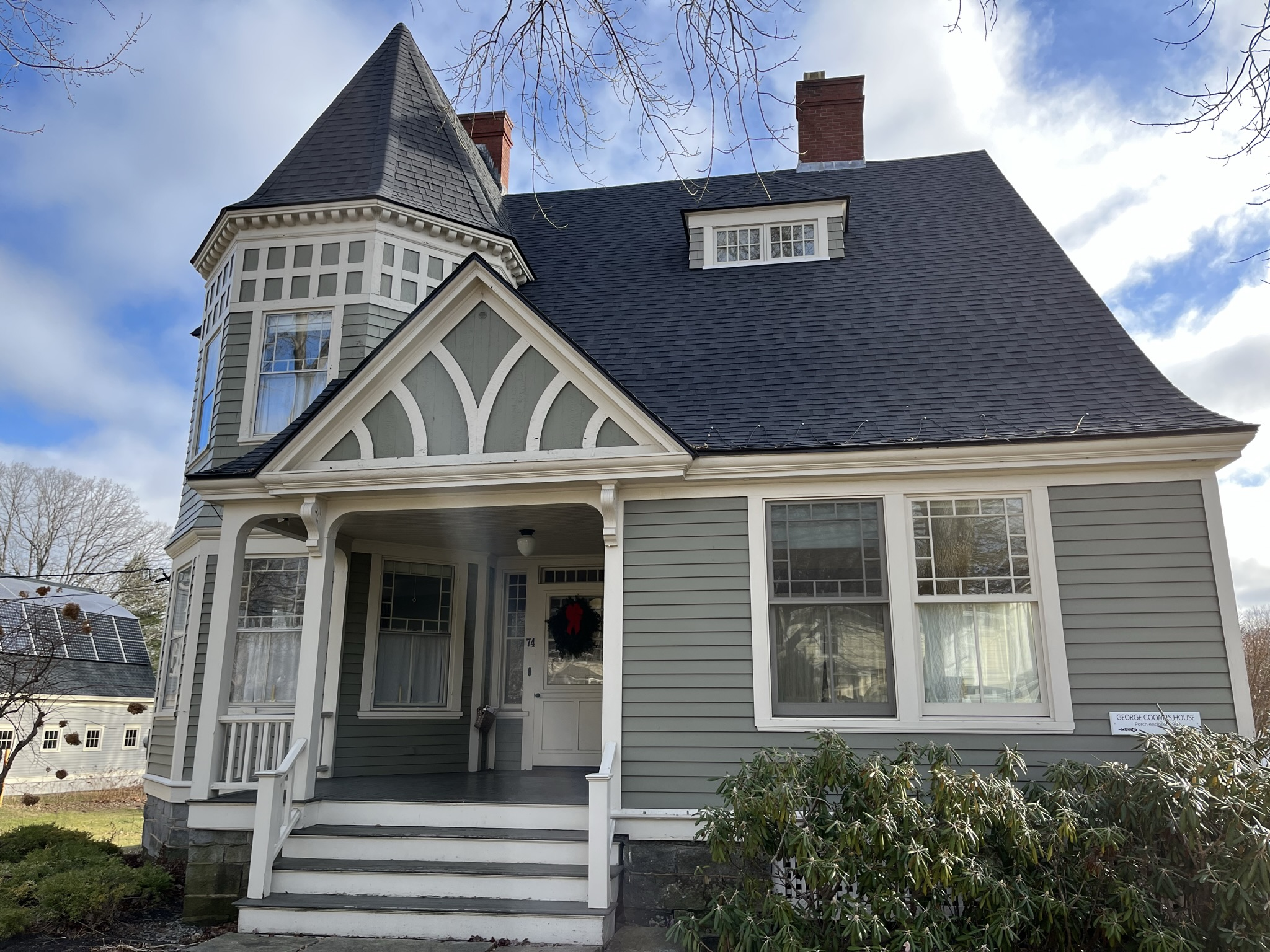
George Coombs House (2022)

Dr. Lewis Whitney built the Greek Revival number 25 in 1849. It was purchased the following year by sea captain Joseph Russell Curtis (1810–1873), in whose family it remained until 1983.

Numbers 33 and 37 were originally built jointly; the lot was split in 1858. George W. Springer lived at number 33 after this split.

Ship captain Perez Nathaniel Blanchard lived at number 49.

Frederic Gore (1860–1930), the manager of Forest Paper Company, lived at number 62, at the corner of South and Cumberland Streets, with his wife, Angie.

George Coombs, a partner in Coombs Brothers Confectionary Company, lived next door at number 74. In 1909, his brother, Bert, established a Ford dealership on South Street.

=== West Elm Street ===
West Elm Street was an early route into Portland, prior to the 1828 construction of Martin's Point Bridge across the Presumpscot River in Falmouth Foreside, hence one of its former names was "Portland road". It was also known as Chapel Street for a period.

== Mayberry Lane ==
Mayberry Lane braches off from the northern section of Portland Street, most visible if coming from the village because it runs at an angle from where the Lindquist Funeral Home stands.

Number 9 dates from around 1837.

== Spring Street ==
The final name of State Route 88 as it passes north through Yarmouth, Spring Street runs from the East Main Street split to Route 1 at Cumberland Farms.

The northern section of number 19 was formerly the Spring Street Market.

At the split of Spring Street and East Main Street stands number 20, a former gas station and hair salon.

Number 66 was built in 1807, according to the assessor, or in the 1850s, per the Village Improvement Society.

The cape at number 67 dates to the late 18th or early 19th century. Meanwhile, a survey conducted in the 1970s alleges that number 68, now significantly altered, originates from 1820.

The final home before the western section of Bayview Street, number 114, was originally built on Brown's Point at the eastern end of Bayview, and moved here in 1868.

Number 141, past Bayview Street on the eastern side of Spring Street, was formerly the site of Frost's gas station. It is now home to a couple of businesses.

== Summer Street ==
A side street off West Main Street, connecting to Bates Street.

A 1973 survey dates 14 Summer Street to the 1880s; a town assessor places it in 1910.

== Willow Street ==
Connects East Main Street to Route 1, opposite the Hannaford plaza.

The first house on the left from East Main Street, number 4, was moved there from Main Street.

Number 22 was the home of John Fitts.

Horace Stubbs, a carpenter, was the original owner of number 26.

30 Willow Street was moved to this location from near the corner of East Main Street and Yankee Drive, when it was Samuel W. Stubbs' house.

== Broad Cove ==
The cove sits between Sunset Point, at the southern end of Yarmouth, and the eastern edge of Cumberland Foreside.

== Gilman Road ==
Gilman Road, named for Reverend Tristram Gilman (1735–1809), was one of the first streets laid out in the town, in the late 18th century, when the town was centered around the Meetinghouse under the Ledge. The Ammi Ruhamah Cutter House was built in 1730 for Rev Cutter, the first pastor of the Meetinghouse under the Ledge. The house was deeded to the Cutter family in 1735.

== Larrabee's Landing ==
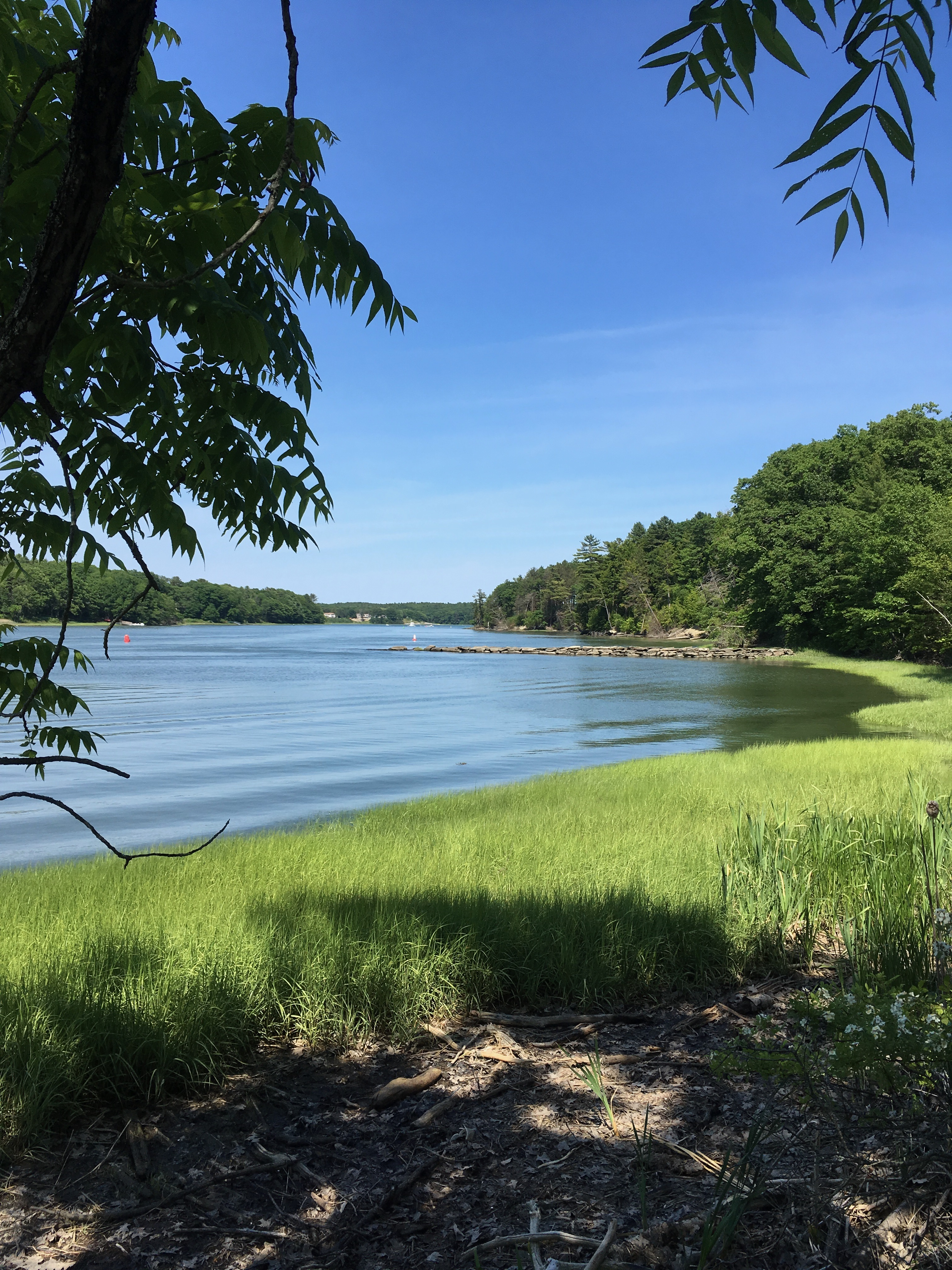
Larrabee's Landing looking east, with Callen Point on the right

Two homes exist around the Gilman and Larrabee's Landing Road triangle. Beyond Burbank Lane, at 38 Larrabee's Landing Road, is the former home of Mrs. Bucknam. The original part of the house dates from 1835 and is believed to have been expanded by William Bucknam for his mother. It later became the home of New Hampshire natives Nelson and Fannie Burbank, for whom Burbank Lane was built. They owned and operated Burbank Farm from 1913 to 1936. The house of Charles Bucknam, at number 68, is the final home before Royall Point Road. It was built in 1835.

Nearby Callen Point was where Captain Walter Gendall was killed in 1688 while taking supplies to his troops building a fort on the southern side of the river. There was a wharf which served the farm.

At the end of Barn Road, which is off Highland Farms Road (formerly Vaill Point Road), is Parker Point's (formerly Mann's Point), named for Yarmouth's first inn owner, James Parker, a native of Groton, Massachusetts Bay Colony. This was home to one of the garrisons set up to protect against Native Indian attacks.

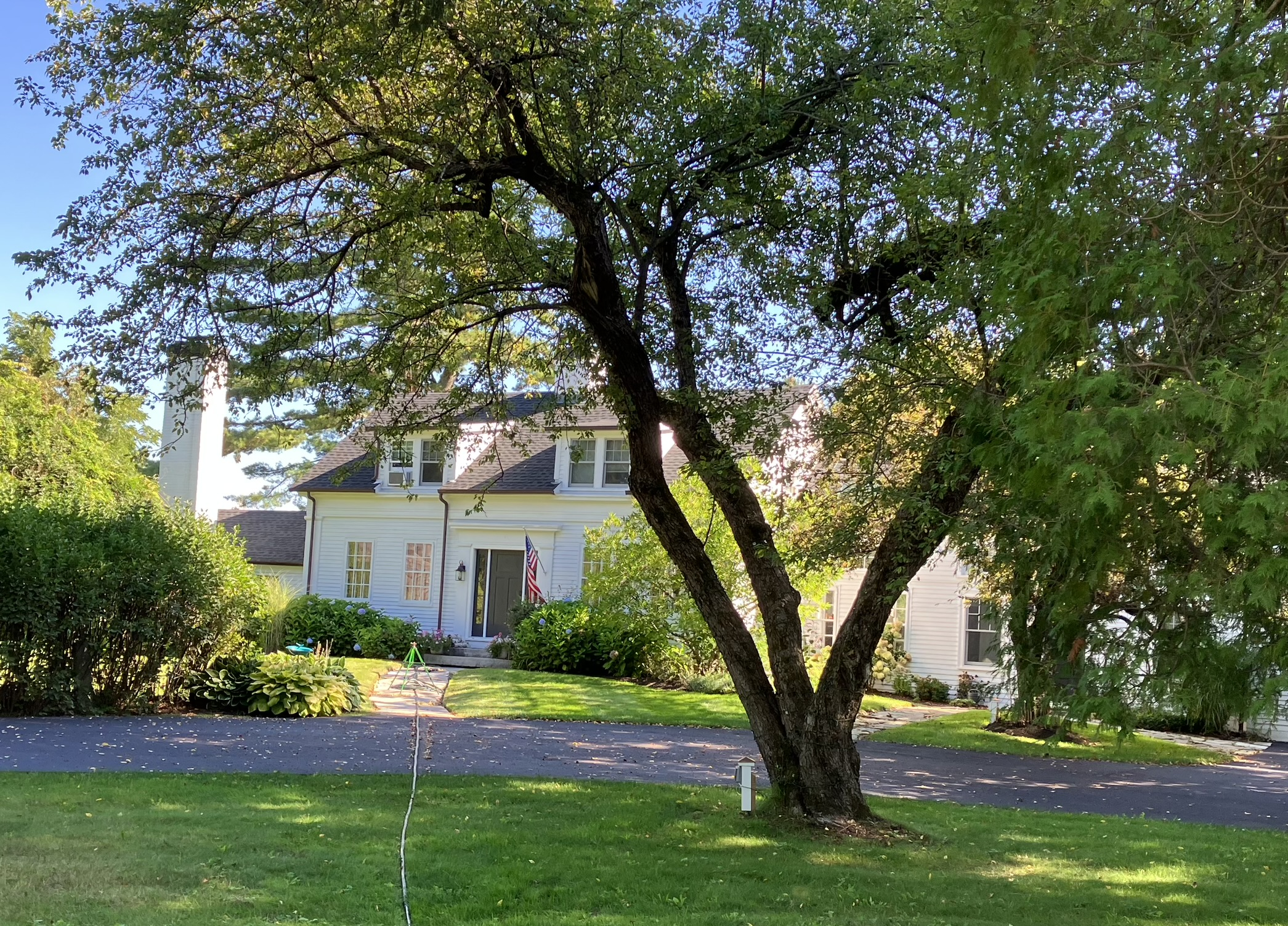
38 Larrabee's Landing Road, the former home of Mrs. Bucknam

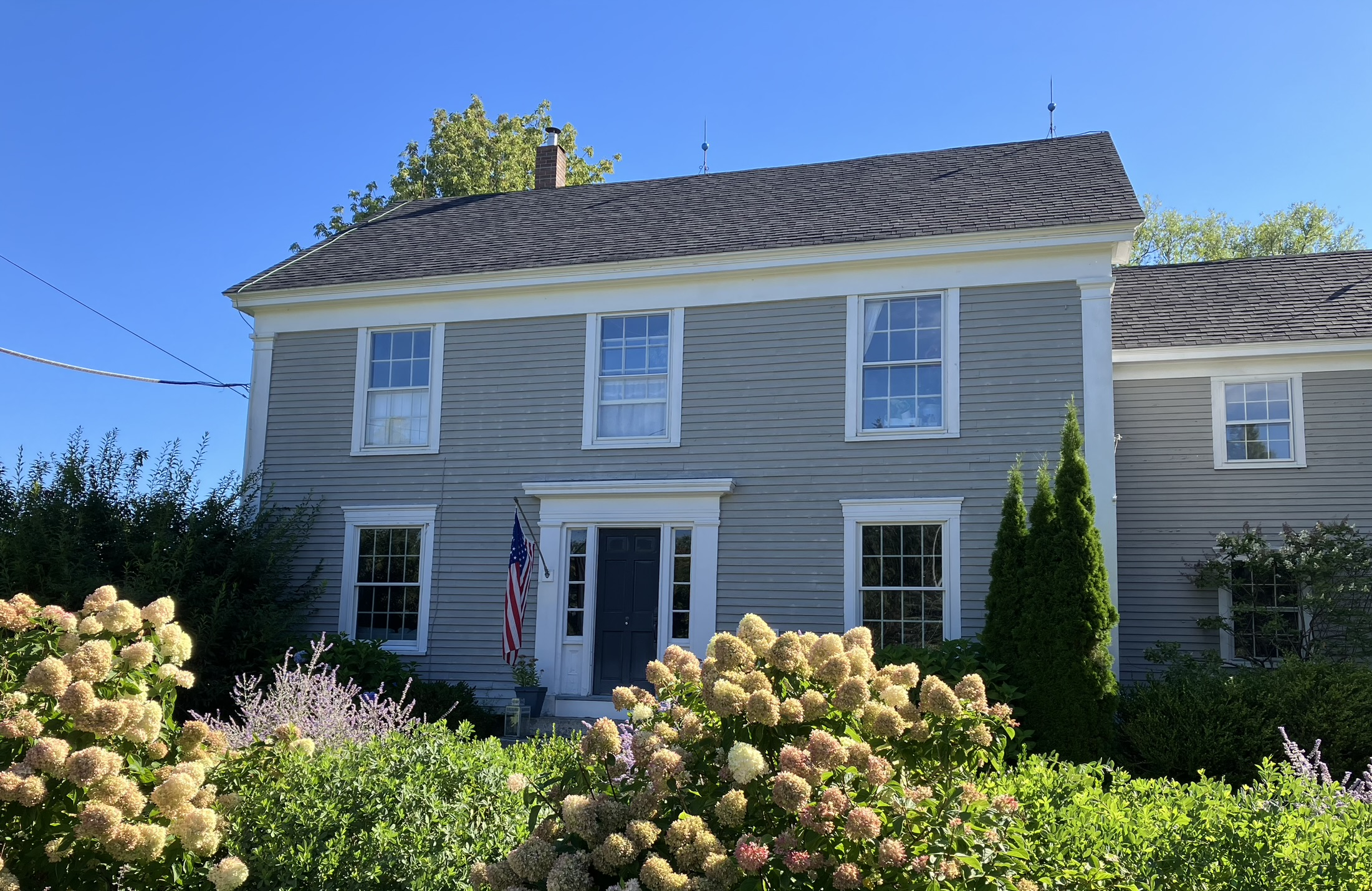
The former home of Charles Bucknam at 68 Larrabee's Landing

== Princes Point ==
Princes Point Road leads to Sunset Point, which forms the eastern edge of Broad Cove.

== Bucknam Point ==
A 1944 map shows Bucknam Point Road and the unnamed road slightly to the west that Umpire Way connects to. These are both off Morton Road.

== Drinkwater Point ==
The Ellis C. Snodgrass Memorial Bridge connects to Cousins Island here.

== Churches ==
Of the eight churches in Yarmouth, five date from the 19th century or earlier and are listed on the National Register of Historic Places. The oldest remaining church, the North Yarmouth and Freeport Baptist Meetinghouse, was built in 1796.

Three of these historic churches are located on Main Street; they are (from east to west):

=== First Universalist ===
The First Universalist (formerly known as the Central Parish Church) is located at 97 Main Street. It was built in 1860 for an Orthodox Congregational parish, and is one of the state's few surviving churches designed by architect Thomas Holt. It became its current denomination (Unitarian Universalist Association) in 1886. It became listed on the National Register of Historic Places in 1988. The site was formerly occupied by Jenks's Tavern, run by Nathaniel Jenks and his son, Seth.

=== First Parish Congregational ===
The First Parish Congregational, at 116 Main Street, was built in 1867. It was designed by Portland architect George M. Harding, and it is the third incarnation of churches built for the town's Congregationalists. Charles Augustus Aiken was ordained a pastor here in 1854.

The First Parish Congregational was originally known as the Meetinghouse under the Ledge and was located facing Casco Bay at the intersection of Route 88 and Gilman Road. It was built from material floated down the Royal River from the First Falls and hauled up by oxen from Larrabee's Landing (possibly by Benjamin and Thomas Larrabee, two sons of Stephen Larrabee, who settled there in the 1720s), further down Gilman Road towards Cousins Island. The path down to the water still exists. The landing was one of the most important in Yarmouth up until the late 1870s, when erosion caused the whole thing to slide into the channel. The Ledge church, which was founded on November 18, 1730, was torn down in 1836, sixteen years after it was abandoned by the Parish.

Yarmouth's early Calvinists fired one minister because he suggested that many people are worthy of salvation. Reverend Tristram Gilman, on the other hand, declared in a sermon that Thomas Jefferson was the Antichrist. Of a settlement that originally contained a school, a tavern and a cemetery, only the cemetery and the ledge doorstep of the church remain. A second, larger cemetery, known as Ledge Cemetery, was established in 1770.

Tristram Gilman died in 1809. Francis Brown, an 1805 graduate of Dartmouth College and later its president, was invited to preach before the Congregational church. Brown accepted the position of pastor, with the proviso that the church, which had been in use for nearly eighty years, be discontinued. The second church (known as Old Sloop) was built in 1818, at the eastern corner of Main and Bridge Streets (at present-day 121 Main Street), but it was abandoned in 1868 and torn down in 1879. (Lorenzo L. Shaw later lived here in a carriage house, but it burned down in a fire in 1967.) Brown married Elizabeth Gilman, the eldest daughter of his predecessor. Their son was Samuel Gilman Brown. Samuel's son, another Francis Brown, was a theologian.

Those who were against the building of the new church incorporated themselves as the Chapel Religious Society in 1820.

The present church was built on the other side of Main Street in 1867 and dedicated the following year. It was added to the National Register of Historic Places in 1995. A plaque commemorating the 275th anniversary of the church was laid on November 18, 2005. The church's steeple is illuminated every night, sometimes in honor of a member or a relative.

=== First Baptist ===
The First Baptist Church, at 346 Main Street, was built in 1889. It was designed by John Calvin Stevens.

The other two are:

=== Cousins Island Chapel ===
Cousins Island Chapel, at 414 Cousins Street, was built in 1895. It has been holding non-denominational services since 1954 in a former Baptist church. It is listed on the National Register of Historic Places.

=== Baptist Meeting House ===
The North Yarmouth and Freeport Baptist Meeting House (known locally as the Old Meeting House or the Meetinghouse on the Hill) at 25 Hillside Street was built in 1796. It has been twice altered: by Samuel Melcher in 1825 and by Anthony Raymond twelve years later. It ceased being used as a church in 1889, when its congregation moved to the structure now on Main Street. The 1805 bell was transferred to the new home. The meeting house was unused for less than a year. It was purchased for $1,000 and converted into the town's first library and antiquarian society and known as Yarmouth Memorial Hall. It was donated to the town in 1910 and used for town meetings until 1946, at which point they were moved to the Log Cabin on Main Street. During World War II, the belfry was used an airplane-spotting outlook post in the Civil Defense System. Twelve townsfolk per day manned the tower in two-hour shifts. In 1946, the Village Improvement Society (founded in 1911) agreed to maintain the interior of the meeting house. In 2001, the town and the society restored the building, from its granite foundation to the barrel-vaulted ceiling. A non-denominational church service is held here during the town's Clam Festival. The building is owned by the Yarmouth Village Improvement Society and is listed on the National Register of Historic Places.

== See also ==
- History of Yarmouth, Maine
