= Cushing Prince =

American politician

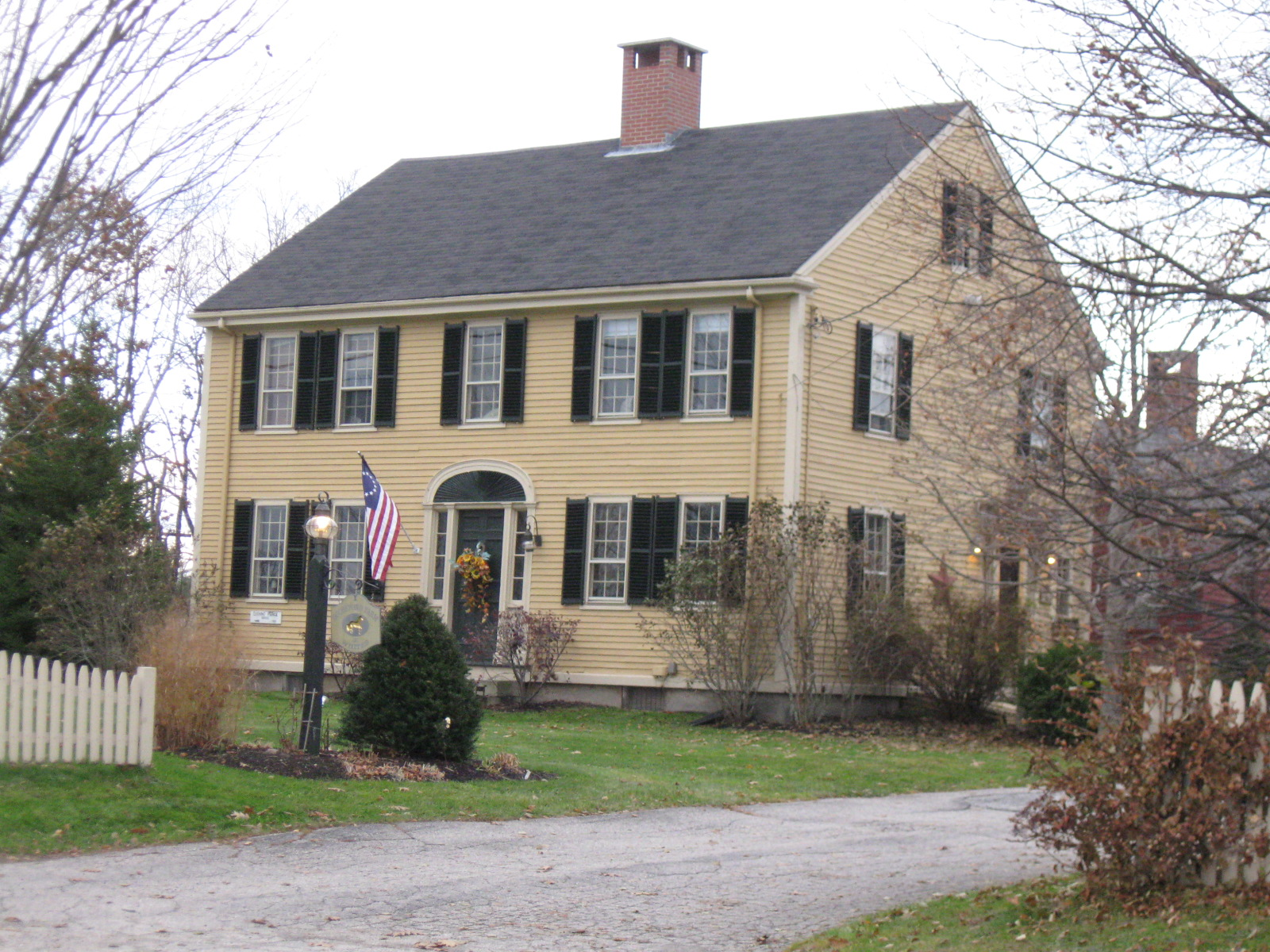
- The Cushing and Hannah Prince House in Yarmouth, Maine
- Born: October 28, 1745; North Yarmouth, Province of Massachusetts Bay
- Died: January 8, 1827 (aged 81); North Yarmouth, Maine, U.S.
- Resting place: Old Baptist Cemetery, Yarmouth, Maine, U.S.
- Spouse: Hannah Blanchard

Cushing Prince (October 28, 1745 – January 8, 1827) was a member of the Massachusetts House of Representatives from the District of Maine. His former home, at today's 189 Greely Road in Yarmouth, Maine, is now listed on the National Register of Historic Places. It was built in 1785.

== Life and career ==
Prince was born in 1745, in North Yarmouth, Province of Massachusetts Bay (now in Maine), two years after the marriage of Paul Prince and Hannah Cushing. His father (for whom Yarmouth's Princes Point Road is named) compiled a bible, known as the Paul Prince Bible, containing the record of births of his children. It was printed in Edinburgh in 1791. Their other nine children were Sarah (born 1744), Rachel (1747), Hannah (1749), Ruth (1751), David (1753), Else (1756), Paul (1758), Pyam (1760) and Ammi (1763).

On August 30, 1773, he married Hannach Blanchard, daughter of Nathaniel and Bethiah, with whom he had three children: Cushing Jr., Polly and Olive.

In 1785, Prince had built a home at today's 189 Greely Road in Yarmouth. It is now on the National Register of Historic Places.

Prince was a member of the Massachusetts House of Representatives from the District of Maine, along with fellow North Yarmouth residents Ammi Ruhamah Mitchell and Edward Russell.

=== Death ===
Prince died in 1827, aged 81. He is interred in Yarmouth's Old Baptist Cemetery alongside his wife, who survived him by eighteen years.
