= Cushing Prince Jr. =

American politician

Cushing Prince
- Born: October 15, 1786; North Yarmouth, Massachusetts, U.S.
- Died: March 7, 1869 (aged 82); Yarmouth, Maine, U.S.
- Resting place: Ledge Cemetery, Yarmouth, Maine, U.S.
- Occupation: Sea captain
- Spouse: Mary Gray Drinkwater (1820–1869; his death)

Cushing Prince (October 15, 1786 – March 7, 1869) was an American sea captain in the first half of the 19th century.

== Life and career ==
Prince was born on October 15, 1786, in North Yarmouth, Massachusetts (now in Maine), to Cushing Prince and Hannah Blanchard. He was their first child, and was followed by Polly and Olive.

Around the age of twenty, he began to develop an interest in the sea. By the 1830s, at the latest, he was a sea captain.

In the War of 1812, he was a corporal in Captain D. Mitchell's company and Lieutenant J. E. Foxcroft's regiment.

In 1820, he married Mary Gray Drinkwater, with whom he had two children: Isabella Graham and Mary Gray. After undertaking teaching careers throughout the United States, the sisters were invited to Japan to help its natives develop their culture by introducing "ideas and industry from the west."

After his father's death in 1827, Prince inherited the family home at today's 189 Greely Road in Yarmouth. It is now on the National Register of Historic Places. He later moved to the Daniel Wallis house at 330 Main Street.

Between 1845 and 1846, Prince was a member of the Maine House of Representatives.

=== Death ===
Prince died on March 7, 1869, aged 82. He is interred in Yarmouth's Ledge Cemetery alongside his wife, who survived him by three years.
