= Gad Hitchcock =

American physician (1788–1837)

- Hitchcock around 1830
- Born: April 18, 1788; Pembroke, Massachusetts, U.S.
- Died: November 17, 1837 (aged 49); North Yarmouth, Maine, U.S.
- Resting place: Old Baptist Cemetery, Yarmouth, Maine, U.S.
- Occupation: Physician
- Spouse: Mary Lincoln Thaxter

Gad Hitchcock (April 18, 1788 – November 17, 1837) was a 19th-century American medical doctor. He was a fellow of the Massachusetts Medical Society.

== Early life and education ==
Hitchcock was born on April 18, 1788, in Pembroke, Massachusetts, to Gad Hitchcock and Sage Bailey.

He graduated the Medical School of Maine in the class of 1825.

== Career ==
Hitchcock took over the practice of the recently deceased Ammi Ruhamah Mitchell at today's Mitchell House at 333 Main Street in Yarmouth, Maine. He remained there, as the town's only physician, until his own death. He was succeeded by Eleazer Burbank.

== Personal life ==
Hitchcock married Mary Lincoln Thaxter (1790–1875), daughter of Gridley Thaxter and granddaughter of Benjamin Lincoln of the Revolutionary Army. They had the following children: Bela (1811), Lavinia (1813), Henry Bailey (1814), Sarah Lincoln (1816), Rufus William (1818), Gad Jr. (1820), Mary Shattuck (1822), Gridley (1824), Benjamin (1826), Harriet Bailey (1828), Susan Harris (1830), Ann Blanchard (1833) and Samuel Sweetser (1835).

Both he and his son, Gad Jr., were elected fellows of the Massachusetts Medical Society. Gad Jr. became a noted painter who added decorative touches on shipmasters' cabins down at Yarmouth's harbor.

== Death ==
Hitchcock died in North Yarmouth on November 17, 1837, aged 49. His wife survived him by 38 years.
