= Mitchell House (Yarmouth, Maine) =

Historic house in Maine, United States

- U.S. National Register of Historic Places
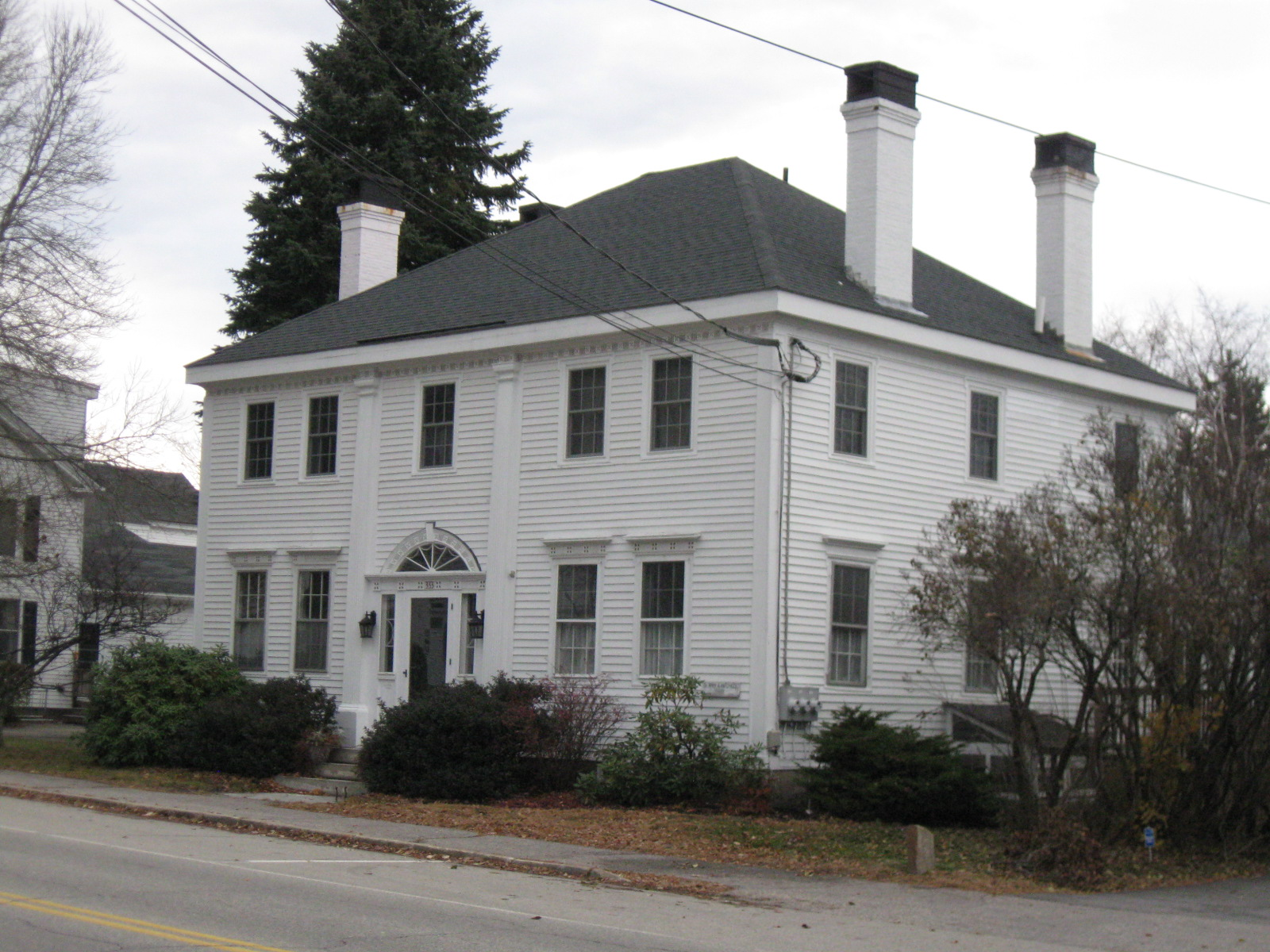

- Location within Maine Location within the United States
- Location: 333 Main St., Yarmouth, Maine
- Coordinates: 43°48′11″N 70°11′32″W
- Area: 0.5 acres (0.20 ha)
- Built: 1800
- Architectural style: Federal
- NRHP reference No.: 78000325
- Added to NRHP: January 20, 1978

The Mitchell House is a historic house at 333 Main Street in Yarmouth, Maine. Built about 1800, it is a fine local example of Federal period architecture. It is also prominent as the home of one of the North Yarmouth Academy's largest early benefactors, Dr. Ammi Ruhamah Mitchell. It was listed on the National Register of Historic Places in 1978.

== Description and history ==
The Mitchell House stands in the village center of Yarmouth, on the north side of Main Street (Maine State Route 115) between Center and Mill Streets. It is a two-story wood-frame structure, five bays wide, with a hip roof, four brick end chimneys, clapboard siding, and a granite foundation. The main facade is divided into three sections, articulated by full-height Doric pilasters. The outer sections each have two sash windows, those on the first floor topped by entablatured lintels. The center section has the main entrance on the first floor, with flanking sidelight windows and a half-round transom above. A 1 1/2-story ell extends north, behind the main block.

The house was built about 1800 for Dr. Ammi Mitchell (1762–1824), a pillar of the local community. He had previously lived at today's 33 Center Street. Well known as a practicing physician, he also served in the state legislature, and was the largest single donor for the founding of North Yarmouth Academy, and one of its first trustees. Mitchell died in 1824, aged 62. He was succeeded as the town physician by Gad Hitchcock. When Hitchcock died in the role, in 1837, Eleazer Burbank (1793–1867) took over.

== See also ==
- National Register of Historic Places listings in Cumberland County, Maine
- Historical buildings and structures of Yarmouth, Maine
