= Eleazer Burbank =

American physician (1793–1867)

- Born: Between January and April 1793; Scarborough, District of Maine, Massachusetts, U.S.
- Died: March 30, 1867 (aged 74); Yarmouth, Maine, U.S.
- Resting place: Riverside Cemetery, Yarmouth, Maine
- Occupations: Medical doctor, mill owner
- Spouse: Sophronia Ricker Burbank (1822–1867; his death)

Eleazer Burbank (between January and April 1793 – March 30, 1867) was a 19th-century American Medical doctor and legislator in the State of Maine.

== Early life and education ==
Burbank was born in early 1793 in Scarborough, Maine (then part of Massachusetts), to Samuel Baird Burbank and Esther Boothby, one of their many children. They were married on August 7, 1791, at the Second Congregational Church in Scarborough.

He studied as an undergraduate at Dartmouth College, in Hanover, New Hampshire, and walked the 100 miles (160 km) for his first day there.

After obtaining an M.D. at Harvard College, he returned to Poland, Maine, to set up practice in 1816.

== Career ==
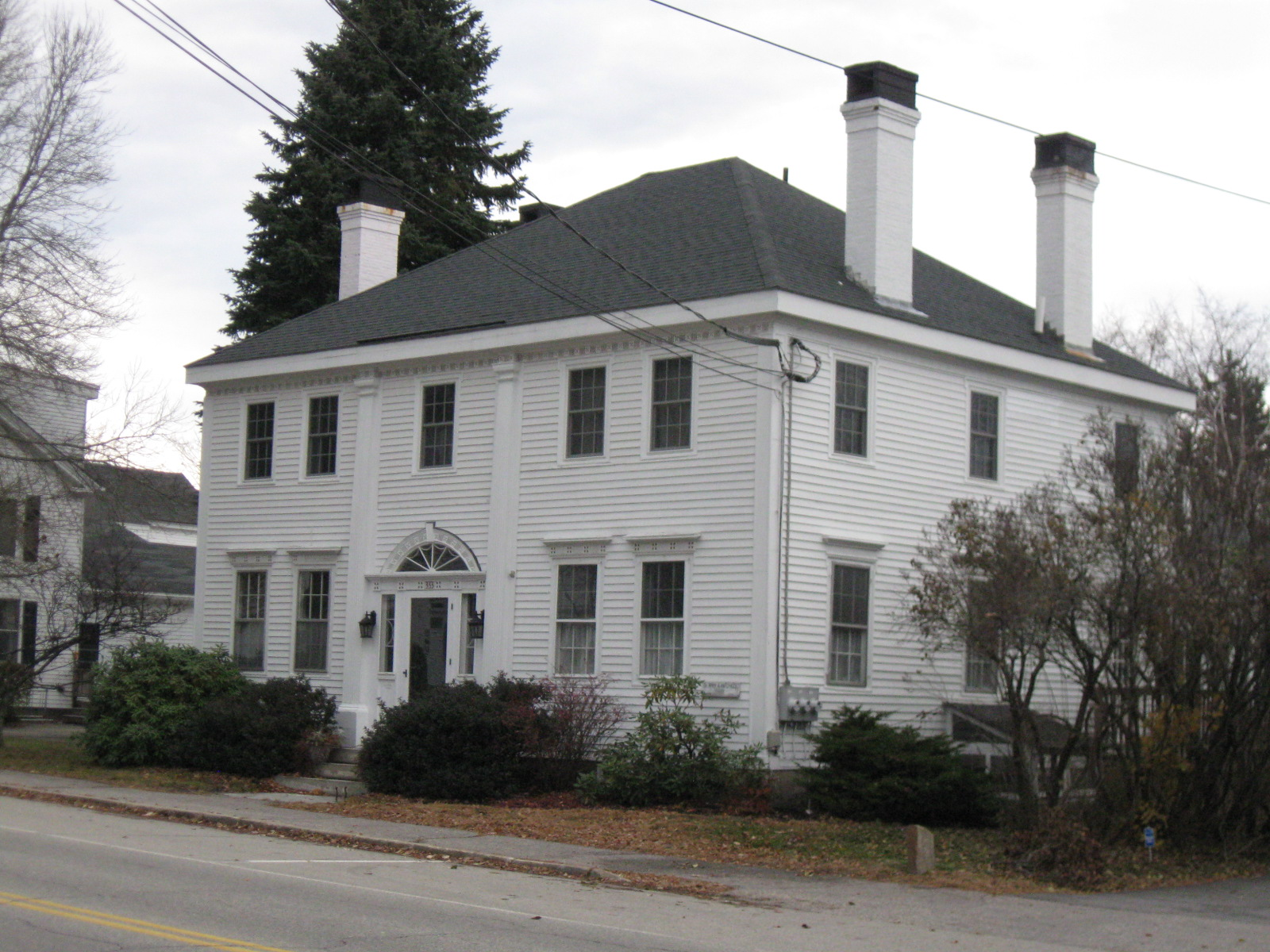
Burbank's medical practice was at today's 333 Main Street in Yarmouth between 1838 and 1867

In 1838, after 22 years working in Poland, he took over the practice of Dr. Gad Hitchcock, who died the previous year, at what is now known as the Mitchell House at today's 333 Main Street in Yarmouth, Maine. Its original owner, another physician, Ammi Ruhamah Mitchell (1762–1824), died "suddenly", aged 62. Burbank practiced on Main Street for the next 29 years, until his death.

In 1847, Burbank founded the North Yarmouth Manufacturing Company at Sparhawk Mill in Yarmouth. The mill produced yarn and cloth.

== Personal life ==
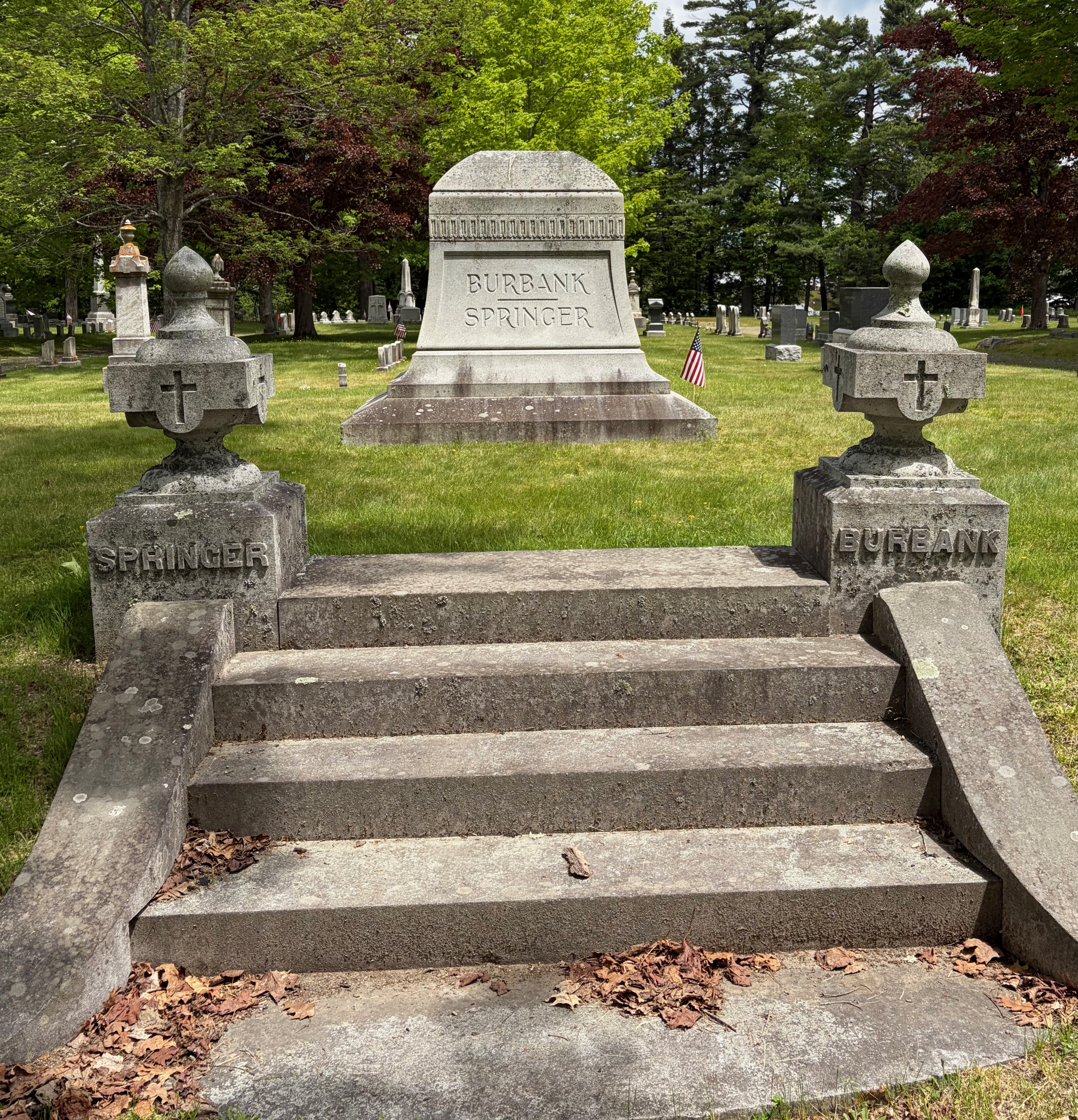
The Burbank–Springer marker at Riverside Cemetery in Yarmouth, Maine

Burbank married Sophronia Ricker in 1822, with whom he had two known children: Augustus, in 1823, and Esther, four years later.

Between 1857 and 1858, he was a Maine state senator.

Burbank was also a deacon at Yarmouth's First Parish Congregational Church for sixteen years.

== Death ==
Burbank died on March 30, 1867, aged 74. His funeral was held at the First Parish on April 23, officiated by pastor George Augustus Putnam.

He was interred in Yarmouth's Riverside Cemetery, although the cemetery was not officially established for two more years.
