= Jonathan Greeley =

American sea captain

- Born: December 9, 1741; North Yarmouth, Province of Massachusetts Bay
- Died: 1781 (aged 39 or 40); Marblehead, Massachusetts, U.S.
- Resting place: Central Burying Ground, Boston, Massachusetts, U.S.
- Occupation: Sea captain
- Spouse: Mary Hitchborn (1768–1781; his death)

Jonathan Greeley (or Greely) (December 9, 1741 – 1781) was an American sea captain. He was captain and co-owner of the schooner Speedwell, which was scuttled by a British frigate off the coast of Marblehead, Massachusetts, in 1781, during the American Revolutionary War.

== Life and career ==
Greeley was born in 1741, in North Yarmouth, Province of Massachusetts Bay (now in Maine), to Philip and Hannah. His father was killed by Native Americans in North Yarmouth in 1746, when Jonathan was five years old.

Greeley married Mary Hitchborn (1742–1819) on December 15, 1768. They had six children, each of whom were born in Boston: Anna (born 1769), Mary (1771), Hannah (1773), Isannah (1775–1800), Frances (1777) and Elizabeth (1778).

== Death ==
Greeley was killed in 1781, when his privateer, Speedwell, was scuttled by a British frigate off the coast of Marblehead, Massachusetts, during the Revolutionary War. The ship was carrying eight guns (another source says ten), twelve swivels and 70 men. His commander sent his body and his sword to his family. Greeley was formerly a commander of the vessel, a petition for his installment being signed by major Thomas Melvill in 1776.
