= Cushing and Hannah Prince House =

Historic house in Maine, United States

- U.S. National Register of Historic Places
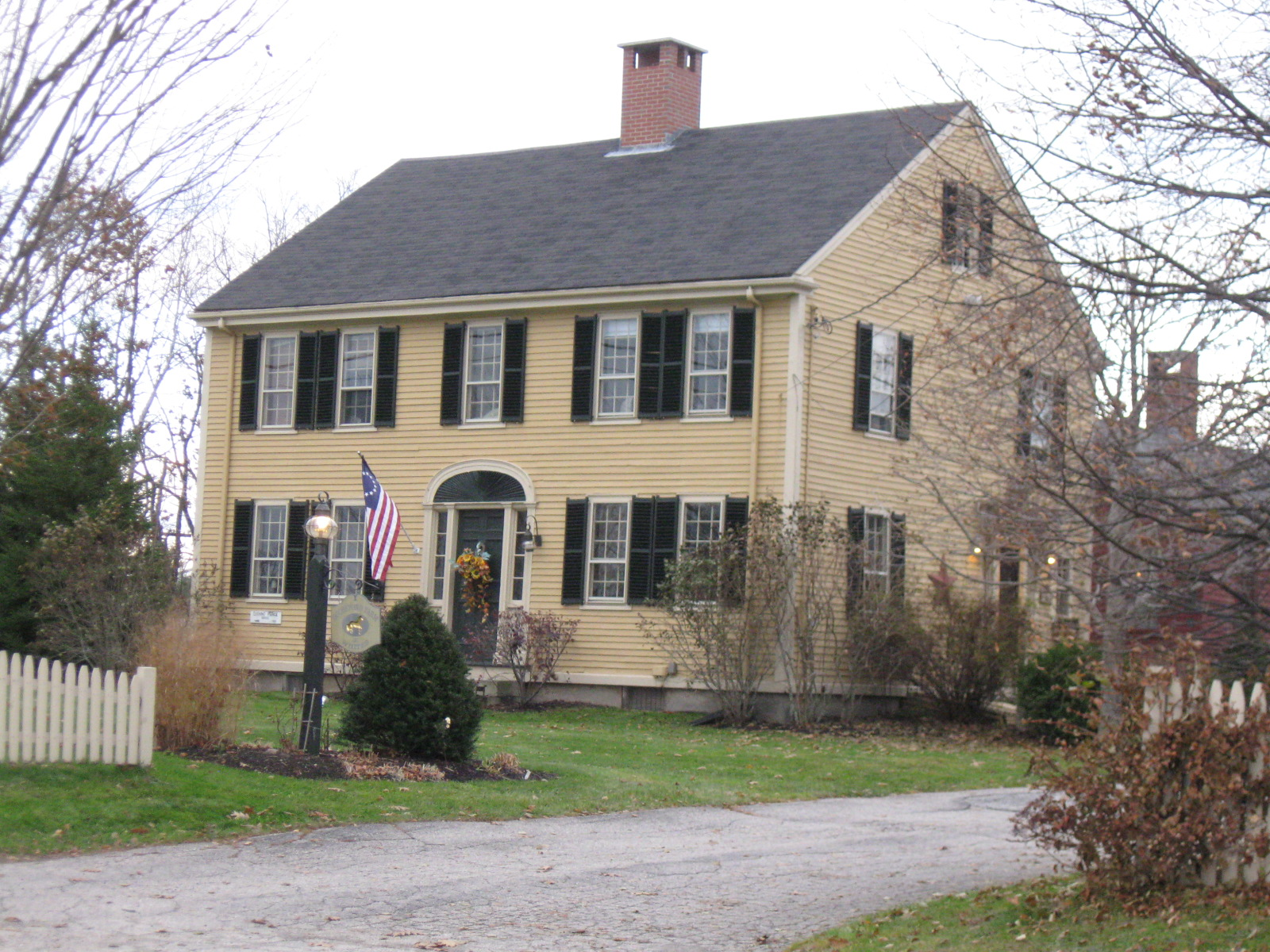
- Pictured in 2011

- Location within Maine Location within the United States
- Nearest city: Yarmouth, Maine
- Coordinates: 43.79712°N 70.22502°W
- Area: 11 acres (4.5 ha)
- Built: 1785
- Architectural style: Federal, Greek Revival
- NRHP reference No.: 99000772
- Added to NRHP: July 1, 1999

The Cushing and Hannah Prince House is a historic house at 189 Greely Road in Yarmouth, Maine. Built in 1785 and substantially remodeled about 1830, it is a fine local example of a rural Federal period farmhouse with Greek Revival features. It was listed on the National Register of Historic Places in 1999.

== Description and history ==
The Prince House stands in far western Yarmouth, on the northeast side of Greely Road, just north of Maxfield Brook. It is a 2 1/2-story wood-frame structure, with a side-gable roof, central chimney, clapboard siding, and a granite block foundation. A long single-story ell extends to the rear. The main facade is five bays wide, with a central entrance that is framed by sidelight windows and pilasters, with an elliptical fanlight above. The southeast side has a secondary entrance which features sidelight windows and a Federal period entablature. The interior follows a typical early Federal period central chimney plan, with the main stairway in front of the chimney, with the parlor to the left, dining room to the right, and a now-modernized kitchen extending across the rear. A second staircase is located next to the side entrance. Woodwork on the interior is a mix of Greek Revival and Federal styles, with a particularly fine fireplace mantel surround in the parlor.

The house is presumed to have been built about 1785, when Cushing Prince (1745–1827) acquired more than 120 acres (49 ha) of land here from his father. He lived in this house with his wife, Hannah (1752–1843). The house appears to have had extensive work done in the early 1830s, when its tax valuation rose, even though the amount land declined by 40 acres (16 ha). The house remained in the hands of Prince descendants until 1912, and its associated acreage was reduced to 12 acres (4.9 ha) in 1959–60.

== See also ==
- National Register of Historic Places listings in Cumberland County, Maine
- Historical buildings and structures of Yarmouth, Maine
