= Ammi Ruhamah Mitchell =

American physician (1762–1824)

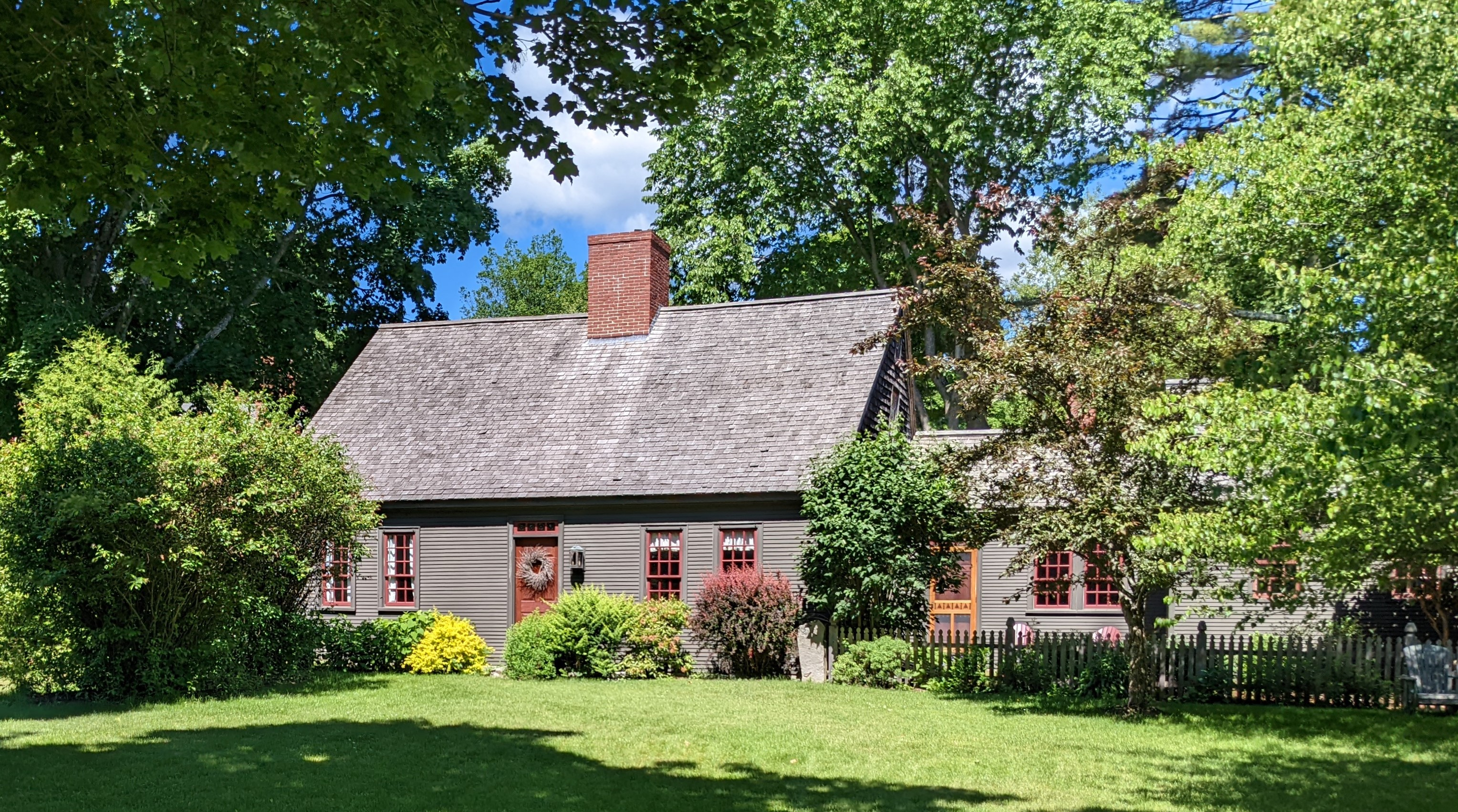
- Mitchell built this house, on Yarmouth's Center Street, around 1785
- Born: May 8, 1762; North Yarmouth, Province of Massachusetts Bay
- Died: May 14, 1824 (aged 62); North Yarmouth, Massachusetts, U.S.
- Resting place: Old Baptist Cemetery, Yarmouth, Maine, U.S.
- Occupation: Physician
- Spouse: Phebe Cutter Mitchell (1785–1824; his death)

Ammi Ruhamah Mitchell (May 8, 1762 – May 14, 1824) was an 18th- and 19th-century American medical doctor. He also served ten years in the Massachusetts Legislature.

== Early life and education ==
Mitchell was born in 1762 in North Yarmouth, Province of Massachusetts Bay (today's North Yarmouth, Maine), to Judge David Mitchell and Lucretia Loring. His father was a judge of the Court of Common Pleas of the County of Cumberland for nineteen years.

He studied medicine in Portsmouth, Province of New Hampshire. While in Portsmouth, at the end of the Revolutionary War, Mitchell accompanied French surgeon Dr. Meaubec aboard a 74-gun ship that was sent as a gift to Louis XVI in Brest, France. Meaubec and Mitchell became close friends, with Mitchell later naming his second son David Meaubec Mitchell in his honor.

== Career ==
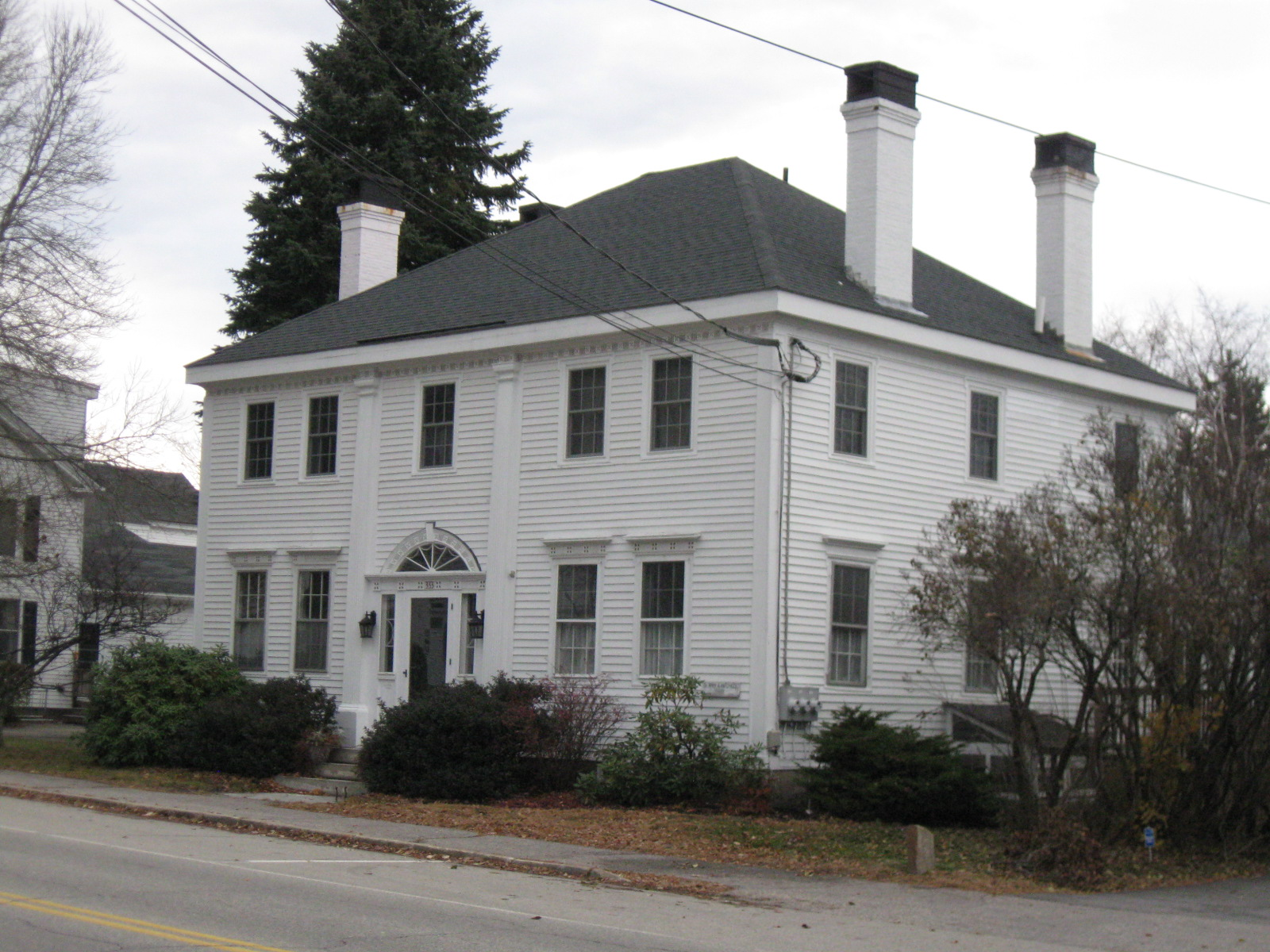
Mitchell's medical practice was at today's 333 Main Street in Yarmouth

Mitchell was the original owner of 333 Main Street, built around 1800, in today's Yarmouth, Maine. He set up his practice there, where he worked until his death. He previously lived at today's 33 Center Street.

== Personal life ==
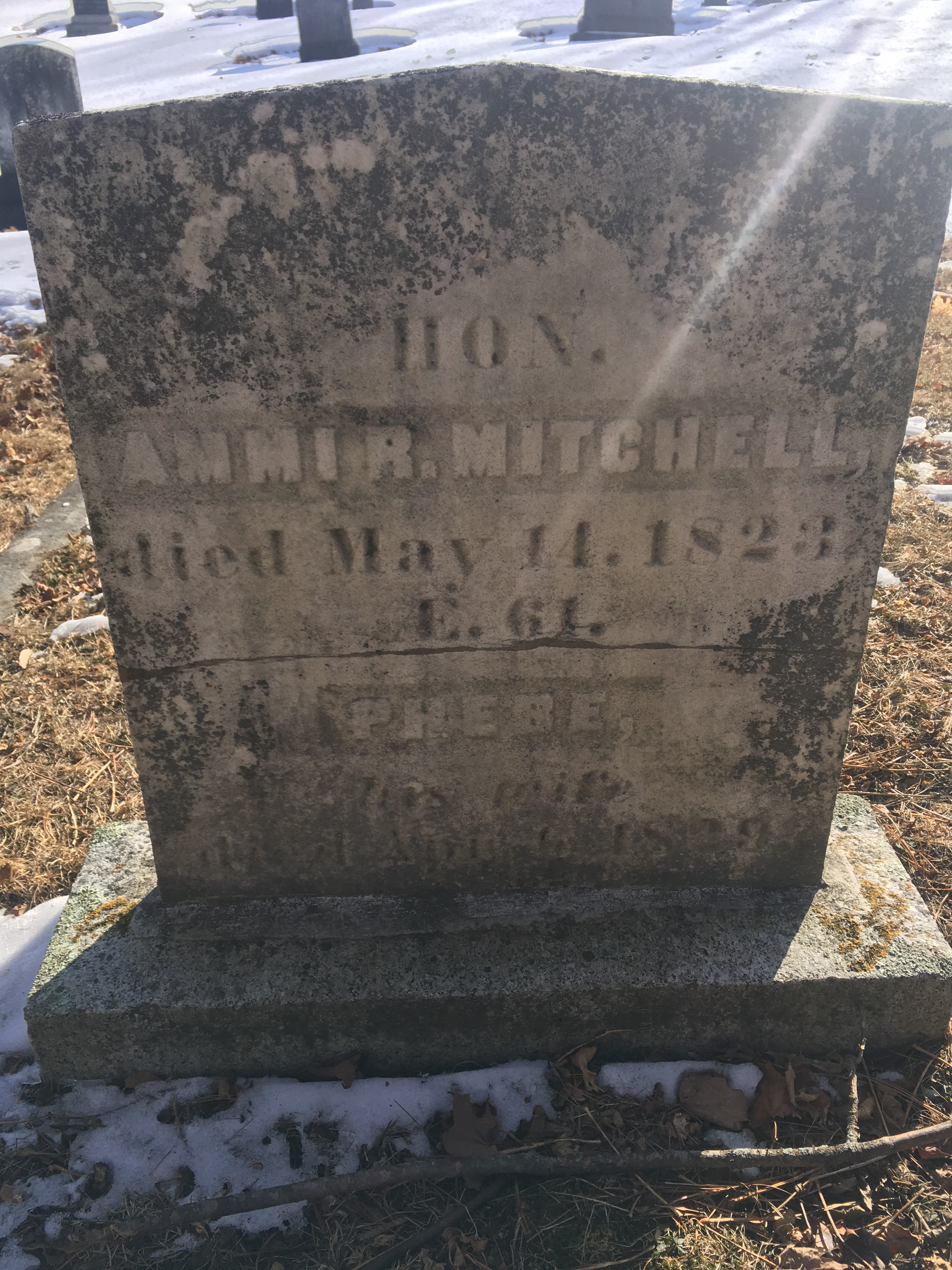
Mitchell's headstone, with (according to sources) an incorrect year of death, in Yarmouth's Old Baptist Cemetery

On August 25, 1785, Mitchell married Phebe Cutter (1764–1829), daughter of Captain William Cutter and Mehitable Gray. They had twelve children: Charles C., David Meaubec, William C., Gardner, Elizabeth G., Jacob, Tristram G., Phebe, Sarah J., Narcissa B., Lucretia Loring and Francis B.

He was an important part of the 1796 construction of Union Wharf at what became the busy shipbuilding harbor in today's Yarmouth. He was also the largest of the original donors to North Yarmouth Academy (NYA), and was one of its two largest stockholders. He later became the president of NYA's board.

In 1803, he was elected a deacon at the Old Ledge Meetinghouse, where Tristram Gilman was 34 years into his 40-year tenure as fourth pastor. His grandfather, Nicholas Loring, had been the second pastor of the church. He died just over a year after Mitchell's birth. Mitchell remained a deacon for 21 years.

He was on the board of overseers of Bowdoin College, and was one of the trustees of the Maine Charity School.

Mitchell served ten years in the Massachusetts Legislature, before becoming a senator in 1808.

== Death ==
Mitchell died in 1824, aged 62. He was thrown from (or fell out of) his carriage, less than a mile from his home, after visiting a patient. He was buried in Yarmouth's Old Baptist Cemetery.

His practice was taken over by Dr. Gad Hitchcock. After Hitchcock's death in 1837, the town sought out Eleazer Burbank, who had been practicing in Poland, Maine, for around two decades, to fill the vacancy. Burbank remained there for the next 29 years, until his death in 1867.
