= North Yarmouth Academy =

Prep school in Yarmouth, Maine, US

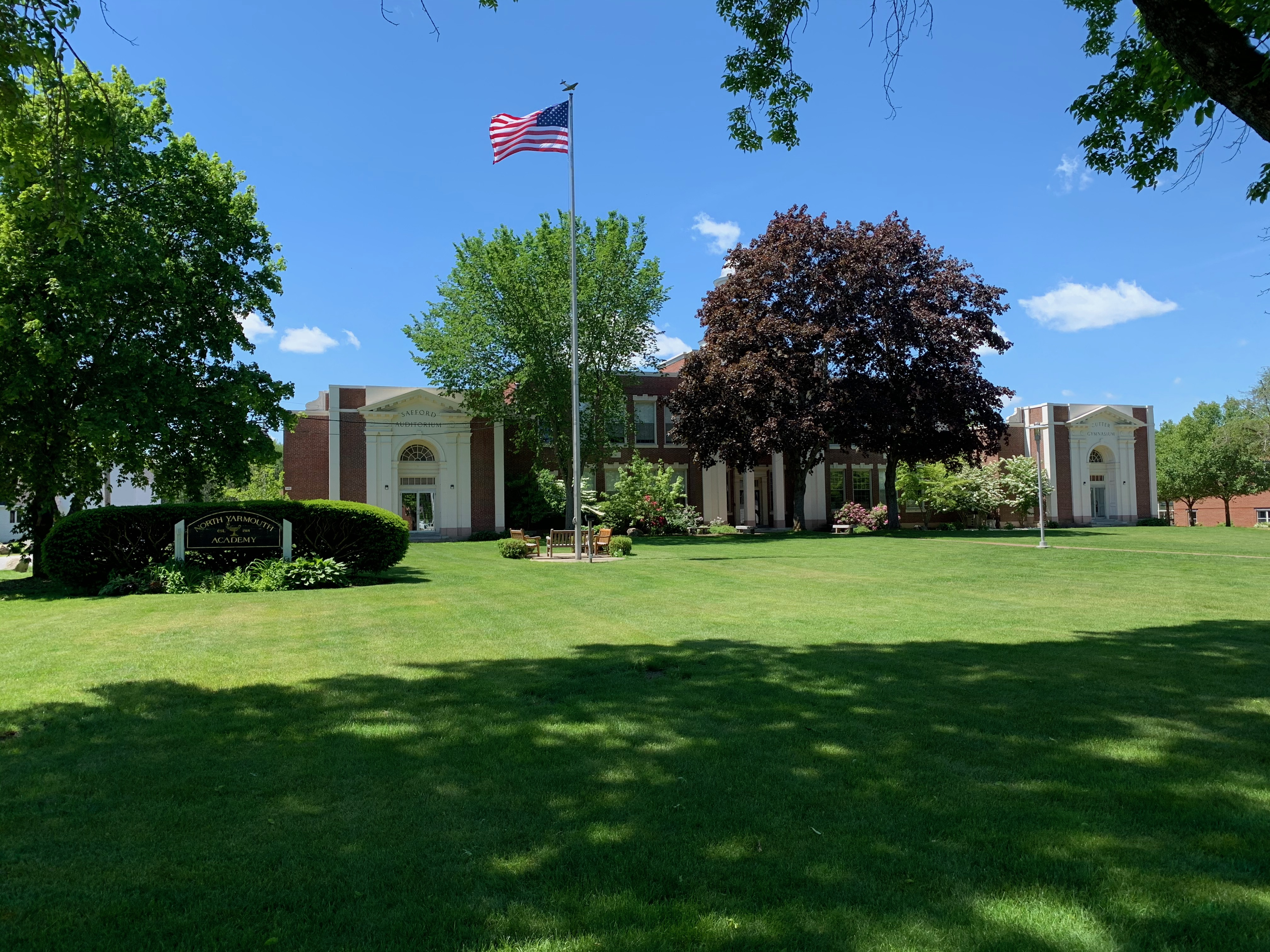
- The facade of NYA's main building is flanked by the Safford Center (left) and the Curtis Complex (right)

Location
- 148 Main Street; Yarmouth, Maine 04096; United States
- 43°47′56″N 70°11′08″W

Information
- Type: Co-ed, prep school
- Established: 1814
- Head of School: Ben Jackson
- Faculty: 57
- Grades: Toddler - Postgraduate
- Enrollment: 403
- Average class size: 14 students
- Student to teacher ratio: 10:1
- Colors: Black and orange
- Athletics: 16 interscholastic sports
- Mascot: Panther
- Website: www.nya.org
- North Yarmouth Academy
- U.S. National Register of Historic Places
- Location within Maine Location within the United States
- Area: 3 acres (1.2 ha)
- Built: 1841
- Architectural style: Greek Revival
- NRHP reference No.: 75000097
- Added to NRHP: March 4, 1975

North Yarmouth Academy (also known as "NYA") is an independent, co-ed, college preparatory day and boarding school serving students from early childhood education to postgraduate. NYA was founded in 1814, in what was then North Yarmouth, Maine, prior to the 1849 secession that established Yarmouth, the town in which the school now stands. NYA has 394 enrolled students with an average class size of 14 students. NYA offers 25 interscholastic sports for boys and girls at the Varsity and Junior Varsity level.

== Program ==
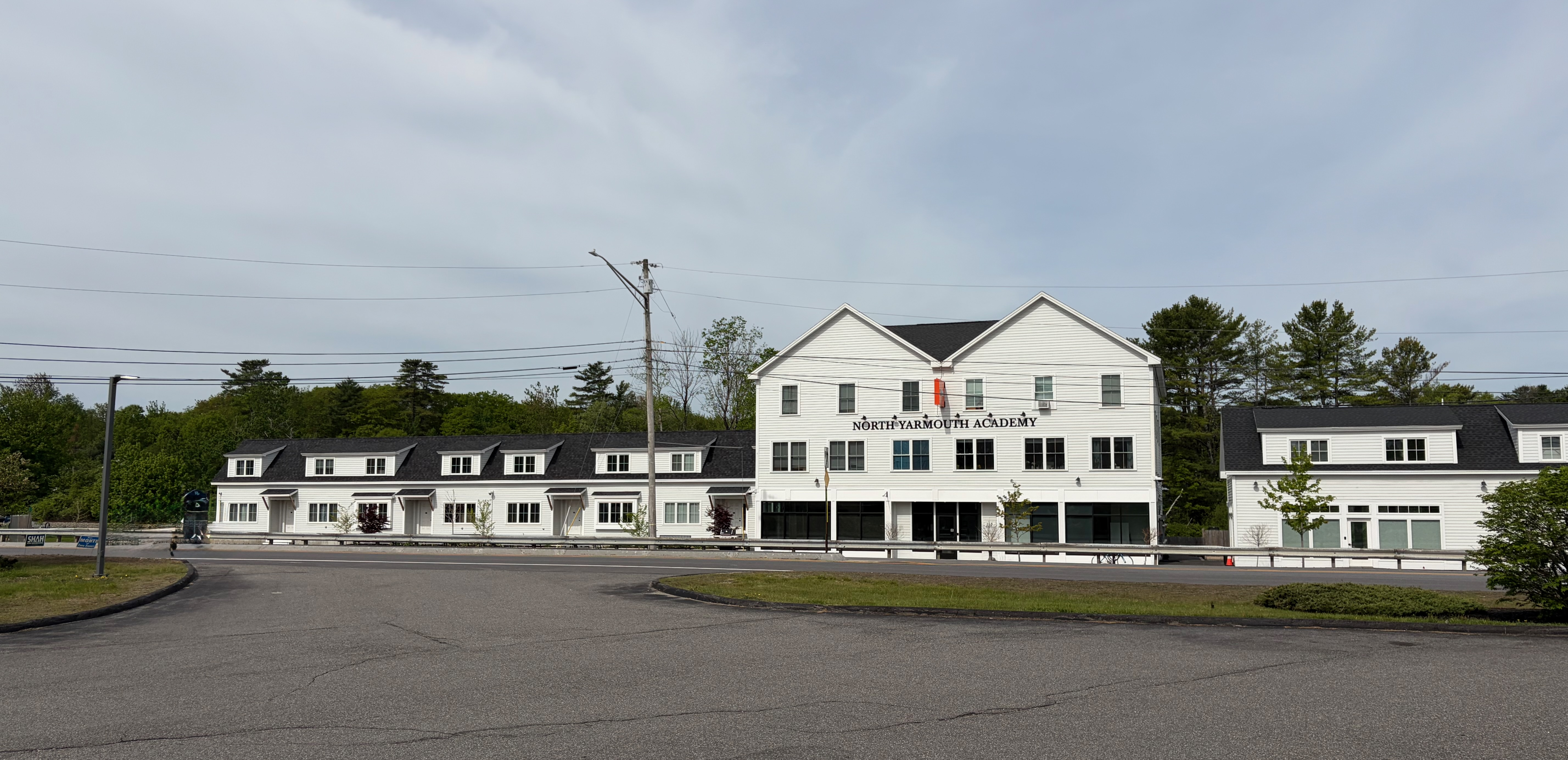
Boarding premises at 350 U.S. Route 1

NYA students carry five academic courses plus electives each year and are required to participate in athletics or theater each season/semester. NYA offers 18 Advanced Placement courses. As of the 2022-2023 school year, NYA no longer offers Mandarin Chinese.

NYA student athletes participate on a variety of varsity athletic teams. All NYA students in grades 6-12 participate in team sports or other after school activity three seasons per year. More than 40% of graduates continue to play intercollegiate sports. One hundred percent of Middle School students and 73% of Upper School students participate in a musical ensemble. There are currently 12 musical ensembles offered at NYA.

During the 2010-2011 school year, NYA students gave more than 4,500 hours to community service, assisting more than 55 community and civic organizations in the Greater Portland, Maine area.

From 2001 to 2011, NYA built a $3M science center (the Peter W. Mertz Science Center, 2006), has renovated the oldest building on campus (Russell Hall, 2009) into a foreign language center, added an all-weather athletic (turf) field, built the Priscilla Savage Middle School in 2003 and increased endowment for faculty enrichment and student diversity.

NYA purchased 350 US-1 in Yarmouth in May 2025 with plans to open to boarding students in fall 2025.

NYA added a Lower School, grades Pre-K through 4, in the fall of 2013 and expanded to include a toddler program (18-months) in the fall of 2014. The Lower School uses Montessori methods through kindergarten. In the first through fourth grades, the program builds off a Montessori foundation, fostering curiosity and motivation to learn while also preparing students for an easy transition to the Middle School at NYA.

In 2026, NYA began offering a boarding program, using a building it purchased at 350 U.S. Route 1. It was expected that four faculty and staff members will oversee around 45 students. It expanded the program the following year, adding approximately fifteen spaces.

== Facilities ==
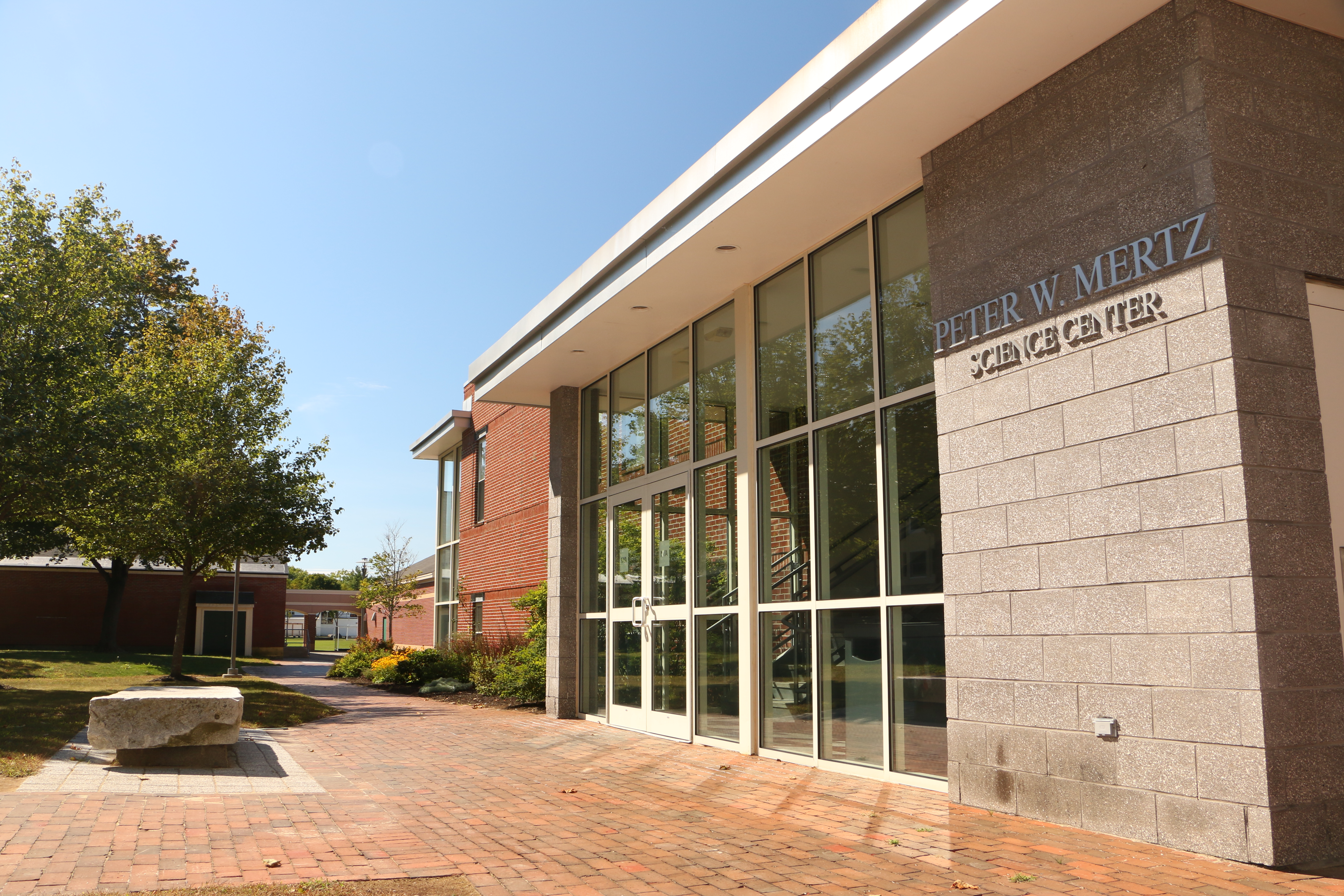
The Peter W. Mertz Science Center

The NYA campus consists of academic and art buildings and two athletic buildings. The campus also has two athletic fields, three tennis courts, and a softball field.

=== History ===
Its two oldest surviving buildings, Russell Hall (1841) and Academy Hall (1847), are listed on the National Register of Historic Places.

The original two-story wooden 1811 NYA school building was removed a few yards to the adjacent Bridge Street. It stood "just below the residence of the late Charles O. Rowe," the father of William Hutchinson Rowe, roughly where number 28 Bridge Street, built in 1860, is today.

In 1852, Litchfield Academy, a two-story wooden school in Litchfield, Maine, was constructed "after the North Yarmouth plan" at Litchfield Corner. The building measured 33 feet by 40 feet by 20 feet.

Two former NYA properties, the Weld House and Shepley House, were sold in 2018 to private investors for development into a condominium complex. The Payne Elwell House, at 162 Main Street, is also under contract to be sold.

=== List of facilities ===
- Priscilla Savage Middle School - Grades 5-8, health services office, and community room
- Peter W. Mertz Science Building - Science, and some math, classes for both the Middle and Upper Schools
- Higgins Hall - The choral and instrumental music building, also includes functionality for a black box theater and recording studio/practice rooms
- Russell Hall - Current foreign language center, Edgar F. White '38 Athletic Hall of Fame, and former science building
- Academy Hall - Former 7th and 8th grade building, currently empty
- Blanchard House - art through grade 5
- Dole House - Office building, including admission, alumni relations, development, and marketing & communications offices
- Curtis Complex - Main building for Upper School students, includes Bicentennial Learning Commons, gymnasium, and Safford Center (cafeteria and stage), main office, and business office
- Toddler House, Storer House - Two classrooms for our youngest students ages 18 months to 3 years old. Former 6th grade building, auction volunteer office, retail store, communications and summer programs office
- Merrill Lower School Building - Main building for Lower School students with primary to grade 4 classrooms. Renovated 23 Storer Street in 2013 and expanded in 2014

== Athletics ==
North Yarmouth Academy has an activity requirement that each student in grades 6 through 12 participate in an athletic program or other activity every season throughout the school year.

=== Sports ===
NYA offers 25 interscholastic sports across the Fall, Winter, and Spring seasons, with teams for Boys, Girls, and Coed participants. Team levels include Middle School, Varsity, and Junior Varsity.

=== Facilities ===
==== Gymnasium ====
NYA's gymnasium is located behind, and attached to, the Curtis Complex. The gym includes the athletic director's office, two locker rooms, and the Hall of Awards. The gym is used for men's and women's basketball, women's volleyball, and for large assemblies, including all school gatherings, and senior speeches.

==== Fields ====
In 2006, NYA completed transforming Lewis Field from grass to turf. NYA currently has two athletic fields, one turf and one grass (Denney Field). Since its completion, Varsity and Junior Varsity Lacrosse, Soccer, and Field Hockey play all their home games on Lewis. NYA uses Knight Field for its softball and baseball programs.

==== Travis Roy Ice Arena ====
The North Yarmouth Academy Ice Arena opened in 1975. In 1998 it was remodeled and renamed the Travis Roy Ice Arena in honor of Travis Roy. The facility underwent a significant renovation in 2022 and 2023. It contains a fitness room, heated viewing area, locker rooms, and a pro shop. It is home to the NYA Boys and Girls Ice Hockey teams as well as the Yarmouth High School ice hockey teams. The facility is also used by Casco Bay Hockey and Midcoast Youth Hockey for their ice hockey programs.

==== The Poulin Family Tennis Courts ====
North Yarmouth Academy has three tennis courts plus a practice backboard which were reconstructed and renamed as The Poulin Family Tennis Courts in 2019.

=== Rivalries ===
NYA maintains two local athletic rivalries. The first is with hometown rival Yarmouth High School, and the second is with Waynflete School in Portland.

== Notable alumni ==
- John C. Hall, physician, Wisconsin state senator and Union Army doctor
- Leonard Swett, 1843, close friend of President Abraham Lincoln, organizer of the 1860 Republican National Convention in Chicago
- Oliver Stevens, 1844, American attorney and politician, District Attorney of Suffolk County, Massachusetts
- T.A.D. Fessenden, 1848, American attorney and politician
- Charles Addison Boutelle, 1851, 9-term U.S. congressman (1880–1901)
- Augustus W. Corliss, 1851, writer and historian
- Harlan Prince, sea captain and politician
- Oliver O. Howard, Union general during the Civil War and founder of Howard University
- Charles Henry Howard, Union officer during the Civil War
- John Albion Andrew, Governor of Massachusetts 1861–1865
- George Frederick Barker, physician and scientist
- Augustus Burbank, physician, former president of NYA
- Henry J. Bean, American attorney and Oregon judge
- Edward C. Plummer, 1881, American author, historian and lawyer
- Thomas Young Crowell, founder of publishing house Thomas Y. Crowell & Co. (1876–1976), later bought out by Harper & Row
- Frank Knight, 1925, arborist, for whom Knight Field is named
- Ernie Coombs C.M., 1945, television personality, Order of Canada recipient
- Carl Henry Winslow, 1949, fire chief
- Mike McHugh, 1983, professional ice hockey player
- Eric Weinrich, 1985, former NHL defenceman
- Eric Fenton, 1988, professional ice hockey player
- Travis Roy, 1995, ice hockey player. After his career ending injury he founded the Travis Roy Foundation and was a highly successful motivational speaker'
- Oliver Wahlstrom, professional hockey player for the New York Islanders
- Haley Bennett, 2009, Broadway conductor and music director

== See also ==
- Education in Maine
- National Register of Historic Places listings in Cumberland County, Maine
