= Leonard Swett =

American lawyer (1825–1889)

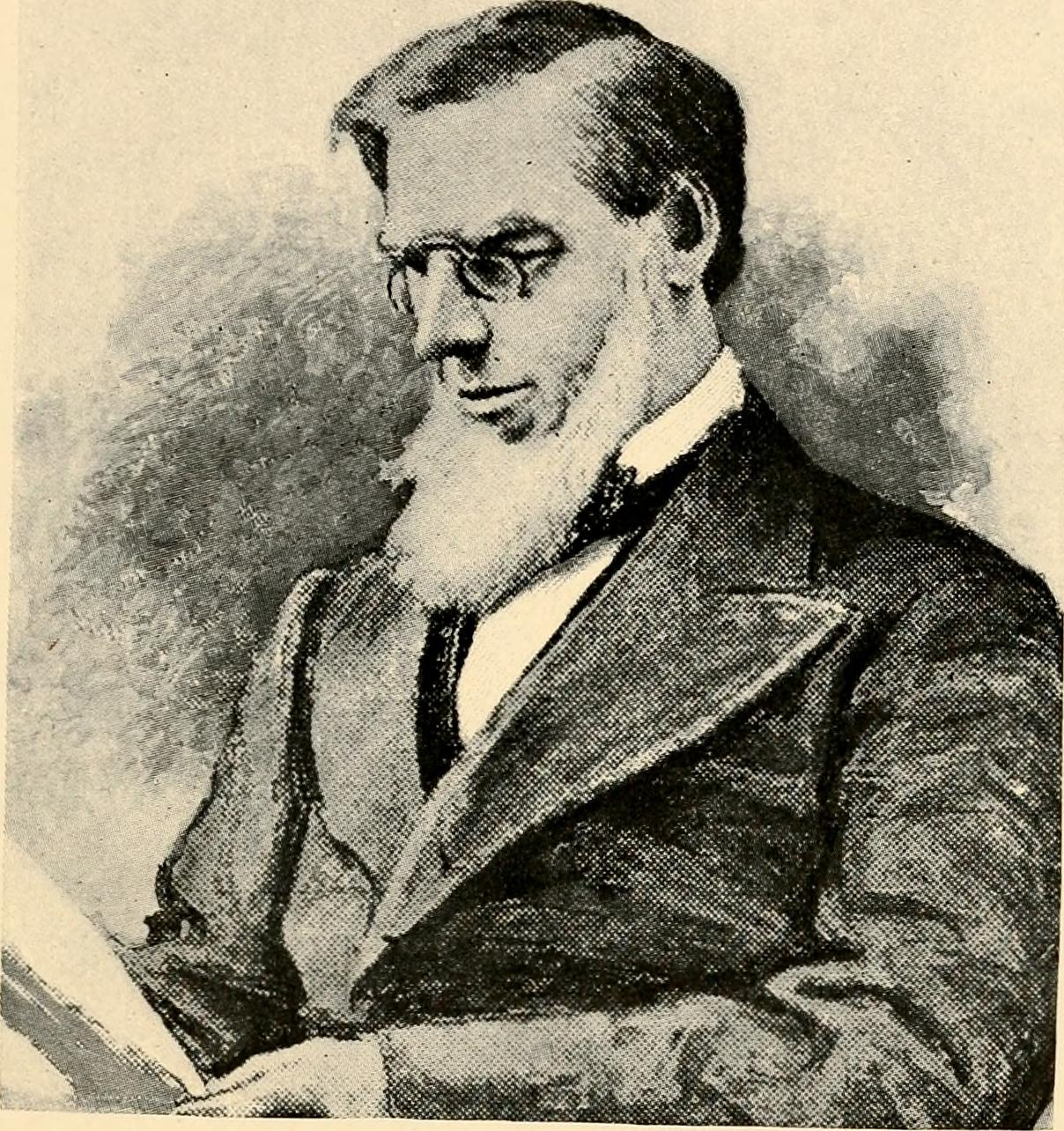

Leonard Swett (August 11, 1825 – June 8, 1889) was a civil and criminal lawyer who advised and assisted Abraham Lincoln throughout the president's political career.

== Early life ==
Swett was born in 1825 near Turner, Maine and educated at North Yarmouth Academy and Colby College, although he did not earn a degree. Swett read law in Portland, Maine and enlisted in the army to serve in the Mexican-American War. After the war, he settled in Bloomington, Illinois. In 1865, he settled in Chicago.

== Political activity ==
Swett and Ward Hill Lamon, along with another Lincoln associate, David Davis, helped engineer Lincoln's nomination at the 1860 Republican National Convention, according to the 1949 doctoral thesis Ward Hill Lamon: Lincoln's Particular Friend, written by Lavern Marshall Hamand at the Graduate College of the University of Illinois.

In 1863 Swett was dispatched to California with an order to seize the New Almaden Mine signed by President Lincoln. In addition to his federal duties he anticipated payment of $10,000 from a group of American investors, many either in or associated with the Lincoln administration, organized as the Quicksilver Mining Company who were engaged in an attempt to wrest control of the mine from Barron, Forbes Company, a British-Mexican firm that had been operating the mine for the previous 15 years. Their legal claim was pursued in the federal courts in several actions.

At the time Lincoln signed the order seizing the mine, unbeknownst to him, the matter was still in litigation before the United States Supreme Court. It was represented to Lincoln that the current operators of the mine were squatters upon lands of the United States. The sweeping order, which could arguably be viewed as assertion of the right to seize any mining property on the lands of the United States, was received with dismay and outrage in California and Nevada. California, as of 1863, was not firmly in the Union camp. Its enforcement was blocked by General George Wright, commander of the Department of the Pacific, a decision reinforced by a subsequent order of Henry Halleck General in Chief of the Union Armies, who believed the order to have been "surreptitiously obtained." Lincoln, mindful of confederate sentiment in California, apologized and attempted to explain the limited nature of the warrant. Swett subsequently played a diminished political role.

Swett is portrayed by the actor Ryan Honey in the 2012 movie Saving Lincoln, which tells President Lincoln's story through the eyes of Ward Hill Lamon, a former law partner of Lincoln who also served as his primary bodyguard during the Civil War.

In the 2017 documentary film The Gettysburg Address, Swett is portrayed by actor Michael C. Hall.
