= Matt Lane =

American middle-distance runner (born 1977)

Personal information
- Born: 5 September 1977 (age 49) Yarmouth, Maine, United States

Sport
- Country: United States
- Events: 5,000 meters, Mile, 1,500 meters
- College team: College of William and Mary

Achievements and titles
- Personal bests: Mile: 3:57.57; 5,000 meters: 13:25; 10,000 meters: 28:00; Marathon: 2:17:32

Matthew Lane (born September 5, 1977) is an American middle-distance runner. He later ran professionally for Nike. Lane was ranked as high as second in the US at the 3000 meters by the USATF. He placed 4th at the U.S. Olympic Trials in the 5,000 meters in 2000 and 2004.

Lane is a graduate of the class of 1996 of Yarmouth High School in Yarmouth, Maine. There, he not only set the state record in cross country at the Augusta course (running 15:40 for 5K).

He appeared in the film 5000 Meters, about the 2004 Team for the Athens Olympic games, and was featured in a New York Times article.

Lane lives in Hopkinton, New Hampshire, with his wife, Erin Sullivan, and their three kids. Erin was an All-American at Stanford University and a twice Foot Locker Cross-Country Champion. Erin and Matt help coach cross country and indoor track at Yarmouth High School before becoming an attorney and professor at University of New Hampshire.

In 2014, Lane was inducted into the Maine Running Hall of Fame.
