= Russell Hall (North Yarmouth Academy) =

- U.S. Historic district – Contributing property
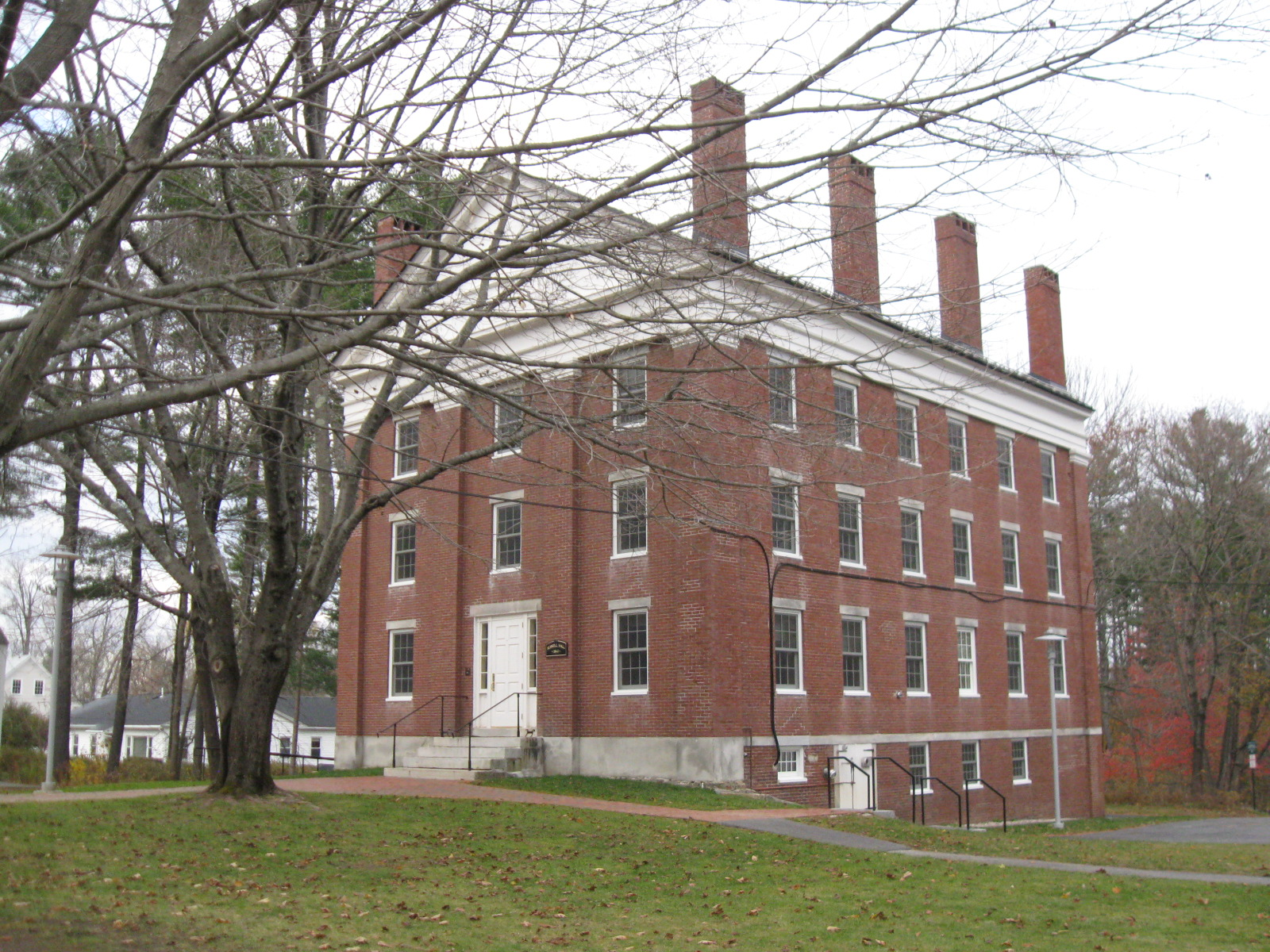
- The building in 2011, looking north from Main Street

- Location within Maine Location within the United States
- Location: 141 Main Street, Yarmouth, Maine
- Coordinates: 43°48′00″N 70°11′02″W
- Built: 1841 (185 years ago)
- Architectural style: Greek Revival
- Part of: North Yarmouth Academy (ID75000097)
- Designated CP: March 4, 1975

Russell Hall is one of the main annex buildings on the campus of North Yarmouth Academy (NYA) in Yarmouth, Maine. Completed in 1841, the building was listed on the National Register of Historic Places in 1975. It stands immediately to the west of Academy Hall at the corner of Main Street and Bridge Street. It is named for the Russell family, who donated the land on which it stands.

It was originally built as a dormitory for students for NYA, which was established in 1814.

The building's façade was formerly topped by a domed Greek Revival belfry, which was removed in 1900. The east and west side walls of the building are identical. The terrain on which it stands slopes away to the north, towards the Royal River, revealing the above-ground brick foundation on the sides and at the rear. Four tall chimneys rise up along each side of the roof.

== See also ==
- National Register of Historic Places listings in Cumberland County, Maine
