= Gordon B. Cross =

American professor (1911–1993)

- Born: Gordon Bismarck Cross; January 30, 1911; Yarmouth, Maine, United States
- Died: January 31, 1993 (aged 82); Fort Lauderdale, Florida, United States
- Education: Bates College; University of Miami; New York University
- Occupations: professor Academic administrator

Gordon Bismarck Cross (January 30, 1911 – January 31, 1993) was an American professor and academic administrator who notably served as president of Nichols College from 1966 to 1973.

== Career ==
A native of Maine, Cross attended Yarmouth High School, and went by the nickname "Peck."

A former commander in the United States Navy Reserve and employee of such companies as Montgomery Ward and S. S. Kresge Company, Cross received his Bachelor of Arts from Bates College in 1931, and then went on to receive a Master of Arts in Mathematics from the University of Miami and a Doctor of Philosophy in Business from the New York University Stern School of Business in 1956. His dissertation was titled "Customer Satisfaction in Navy Exchanges."

In 1959, Cross was named Dean and Professor of Marketing of the University of Hartford Barney School of Business. He then served as President of Nichols College from 1966 to 1973. During his tenure at Nichols, in 1971, the school went from a male-only college to co-educational, and the Commonwealth of Massachusetts authorized the institution to award the degrees of Bachelor of Arts, Bachelor of Science in Business Administration, and Bachelor of Science in Public Administration.

== Personal life ==
On June 24, 1966, Cross married Evelyn-Mae Bradbury, a 1949 graduate of Bryant University, in Avon, Connecticut. The couple had a son, John Douglas, and a daughter, Melissa. Through Melissa, Cross had two grandsons: Andrew and Ethan Wiley.

Following retirement in the 1970s, Cross moved to Fort Lauderdale, Florida, where he had resided for twenty years, and died in 1993.

== See also ==
- List of Bates College people
