= Yarmouth High School (Maine) =

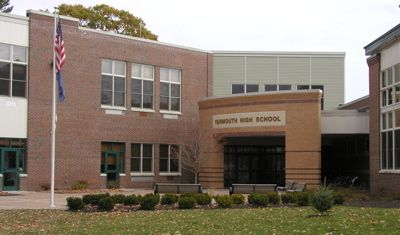

Location
- 286 West Elm Street; Yarmouth, Maine 04096; United States
- Coordinates: 43°47′38″N 70°11′41″W

Information
- Former name: Yarmouth Junior-Senior High School
- School type: Public, State School
- Established: September 1961
- School district: Yarmouth Schools
- Superintendent: Dr. Andrew R. Dolloff
- Principal: Patrick Hartnett
- Teaching staff: 49.50 (FTE)
- Grades: 9th-12th
- Student to teacher ratio: 11.23
- Language: English
- Colors: Blue and White
- Sports: Eight-man football (Co-ed With North Yarmouth Academy) Basketball Lacrosse Soccer Baseball Softball Ice Hockey (Co-op with Cheverus High School) Tennis Field Hockey Volleyball Golf
- Mascot: Clipper Ship
- Nickname: Clippers
- Rival: Greely High School Cape Elizabeth High School Freeport High School
- Yearbook: Maines'l
- Communities served: Yarmouth, Maine
- Feeder schools: Frank H Harrison Middle School
- Alumni: Travis Roy (did not graduate)
- Website: yhs.yarmouthschools.org

Yarmouth High School is a public high school in Yarmouth, Maine, and is part of the Yarmouth Schools district.

== History ==
The school has been renovated to accommodate a 500-seat auditorium, a student union/cafeteria, and a new office area that contains offices for the guidance counselors, the social worker, the substance abuse counselor, the athletic director, the nurse, and the administrative officers.

There were about 520 students enrolled for 2008–2009. Eighty-five percent of seniors go on to college and university studies. There were 52 teachers including all counselors, social workers, special educators, and technology and library specialists.

Yarmouth High is widely recognized as one of the strongest schools in the state academically and athletically.

During the 1986–87 school year, Yarmouth Junior-Senior High School was recognized with the Blue Ribbon School Award of Excellence by the United States Department of Education, the highest award an American school can receive. Since renamed, Yarmouth High School was recognized again as a Blue Ribbon School during the 2005–06 school year.

Each year Newsweek ranks the top 5% of schools in the country. There are over 27,000 high schools throughout the country and Newsweek ranks the top 1,300 by what is called the AP Challenge Index. Yarmouth High School has consistently ranked in the top 400, ranked 303 in 2006, 345 in 2007, 275 in 2008, 176 in 2009, and 239 in 2010. (Yarmouth High School was not ranked in 2011, possibly due to Newsweek's decision to change their ranking methodology to include six components: graduation rate (25%), college matriculation rate (25%), AP tests taken per graduate (25%), average SAT/ACT scores (10%), average AP/IB/AICE scores (10%), and AP courses offered (5%).)

== Academics ==
Yarmouth puts on a musical production in the fall and participates in the Maine Principals' Association Maine State One Act Competition each winter. In years 2007, 2009, 2011, 2013, 2014 and 2015, Yarmouth High School won state titles in the Maine One Act Competition, Class B.

== Athletics ==
Fall sports include Football, Cross Country, Crew, Field Hockey, Golf, Soccer, Sailing, and Volleyball. Winter sports include Basketball, Dance, Nordic & Alpine Skiing, Swimming, Indoor Track, and Ice Hockey. Spring sports include Lacrosse, Baseball, Softball, Tennis, Sailing, Outdoor Track, and Crew

== Notable alumni ==
- Beth Condon
- Gordon B. Cross, former President of Nichols College
- Francis Ellis, stand-up comedian and podcaster for Barstool Sports
- Matt Lane (1996), middle-distance runner
- Travis Roy (did not graduate), college hockey player for Boston University
