= Travis Roy =

American ice hockey player (1975–2020)

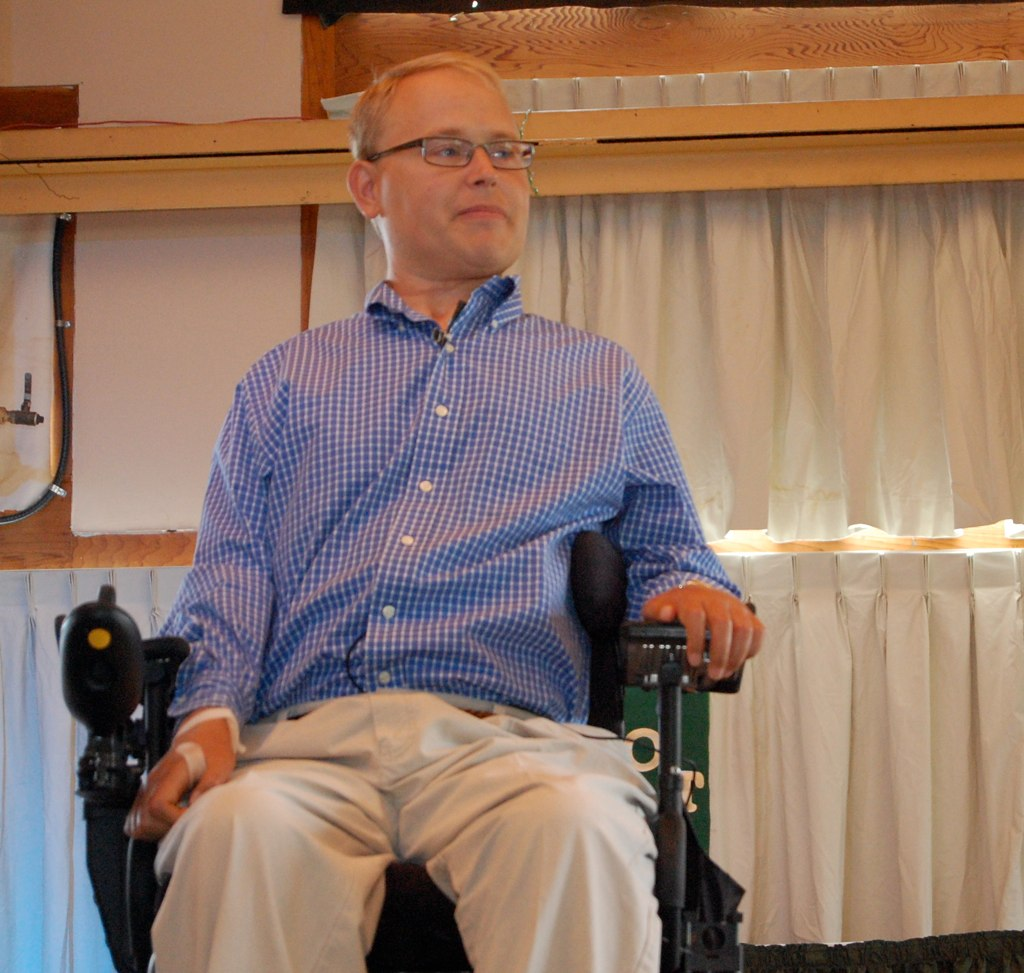
- Roy in 2011
- Born: April 17, 1975; Yarmouth, Maine, U.S.
- Died: October 29, 2020 (aged 45) near Burlington, Vermont, U.S.
- Occupations: Forward for the Boston University Terriers; Founder of the Travis Roy Foundation

Travis Matthew Roy (April 17, 1975 – October 29, 2020) was an American college ice hockey player, author and philanthropist.

In 1995, he was injured in his first shift as a college hockey player for Boston University and was paralyzed from the neck down. He later created the Travis Roy Foundation, which gives grants to enhance the life of people with spinal cord injuries and for research. His autobiography, Eleven Seconds, was published in 1998.

== Childhood ==
Travis Roy was born on April 17, 1975, in Yarmouth, Maine, the son of Lee and Brenda Roy.

Roy grew up playing ice hockey and dreamed of playing for a Division I college hockey team. He attended Yarmouth High School as a freshman, then transferred to nearby North Yarmouth Academy (NYA) in order to pursue an athletic scholarship. Roy transferred again and graduated from Tabor Academy and received an ice hockey scholarship to Boston University (College of Communication, Class of 2000).

Roy also had family connections in Vermont. Elisha Goodsell, Roy's great-grandfather, ran ferries on Lake Champlain, and lived on Malletts Bay, where the Roy family continues to spend time in summers.

== Injury ==
On October 20, 1995 – just eleven seconds into his debut for Boston University men's ice hockey team – a 20-year-old Roy lost his balance and fell head first into the boards after checking University of North Dakota player Mitch Vig. The awkward impact with the boards resulted in Roy cracking his fourth and fifth vertebrae and leaving him a quadriplegic. He subsequently regained movement in his right arm.

After a difficult convalescence, Roy returned to BU the following year, graduating in 2000 with a degree in communications. He remained a supporter of the Terriers men's hockey team, and forged a life-long friendship with head coach Jack Parker.

== The Travis Roy Foundation ==
In 1996, while still attending BU, Roy started a foundation called "The Travis Roy Foundation" to help spinal cord injury survivors and to fund research into a cure. Roy sought to help others who had less support and fewer resources than he did.

As of October 2020, the Travis Roy Foundation had given roughly $9 million to individual grants and to research projects and rehabilitation institutions. Individual grant funds have been used to modify vans and to purchase wheelchairs, computers, ramps, shower chairs, and other adaptive equipment to help those with paraplegia and quadriplegia live their lives. As of October 2020, these grants had helped over 2,100 people with paraplegia and quadriplegia. Donations from athletes, corporations, and community members have made it possible for the foundation to make these grants.

Roy believed that providing grants for adaptive equipment to people with spinal cord injuries was a way to help people live better quality lives. In a Boston Globe article, he was quoted as saying, "It's never about the wheelchair...It's a little piece of independence, a little piece of dignity." According to statistics from 2008, there are approximately 250,000 people currently living with a spinal cord injury and 13,000 new injuries each year in the United States alone.

In October 2015, Sargent College Dean Christopher Moore announced, at a fundraiser for the foundation, that a group of anonymous donors gave a gift of $2.5 million to establish the Travis M. Roy Professorship in Rehabilitation Sciences at Sargent. This would provide the foundation with office space on campus and a $50,000 annual stipend towards staffing for the next 10 years.

The Travis Roy Foundation has collaborated with professional athletes in its fundraising efforts. Chris Drury, a former NHL player as well as a former teammate of Roy's at Boston University, organizes an annual charity golf tournament, which has raised over $1 million toward spinal cord injury research for the Travis Roy Foundation.

== Speaking career ==
Like many young hockey players, Roy grew up dreaming of being in the NHL. With this dream now out of reach, Roy looked to find a new career, a new purpose. Even after receiving hundreds of thousands of dollars in donations after his incident, he also needed to find a way to make money for himself. He turned to public speaking. Roy was paid to tell his story at schools and businesses.

Roy was a well-regarded motivational speaker and gave approximately 40 talks a year. He wanted to show his positive outlook on life, despite the challenges he faced. These speeches were meant to “establish a set of core values, having pride, setting goals, having a positive attitude, which leads toward happiness.” In an interview with the Associated Press, he is quoted as saying, "I like to say the first 20 years I had a life that was full of passion and the last 20 I’ve had a life full of purpose.” Though he has helped to raise millions for his cause, Roy said that he knows a cure for spinal cord injuries like his are far away in the future, and he was not under the impression that he would walk again one day. [Adler] Regardless of the fact that he knew he would not get to see this major victory happen, he cites the small acts his foundation can do for other people with paraplegia and quadriplegia as well as what he does to help and inspire others as what kept him going. [Adler] Roy has also spoken in front of the US Senate in regards to the National Institute of Health, as well as to the Massachusetts legislature supporting the research and experimental use of stem cells to help those with spinal cord injuries.

== Honors and achievements ==
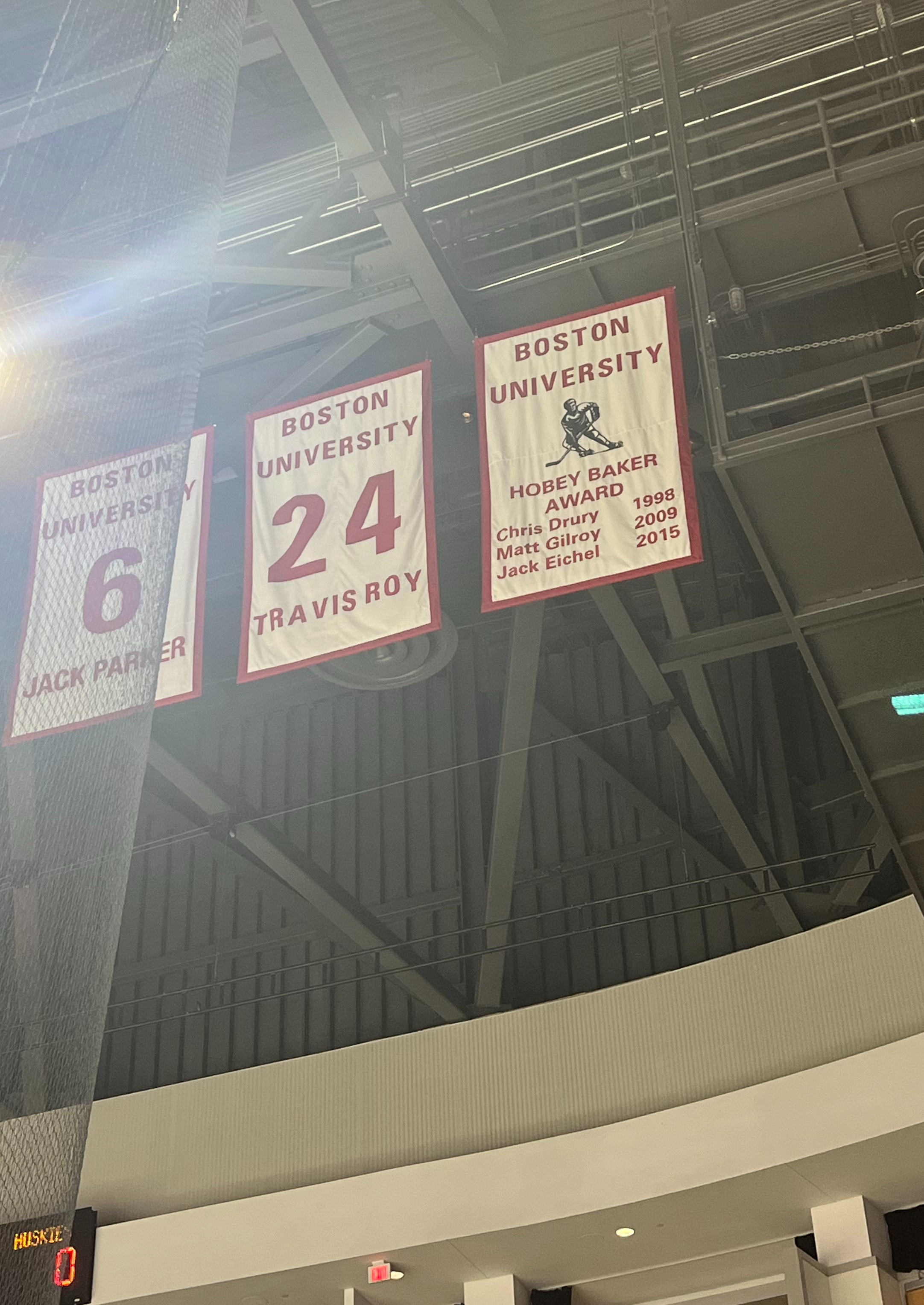
Travis Roy's number 24 hanging in the rafters of Agganis Arena

In 1998, North Yarmouth Academy's ice arena was named the "Travis Roy Arena" in his honor. His jersey number, 00, was retired by NYA as well. It hangs in the rafters alongside Eric Weinrich's No. 7 — the only numbers retired by NYA.

In 1996, Maine High School Hockey created the Travis Roy Award, an award that would be given out annually to the best Class A boys’ high school hockey player in Maine.

In October 1999, Roy's No. 24 was retired and raised to the rafters of Boston University's Walter Brown Arena, now present in BU's Agganis Arena. Roy was the only BU hockey player to have been honored with a retired number until his former coach, Jack Parker, was given the honor in 2014.

In 2015, Boston mayor Marty Walsh declared October 20 to be Travis Roy Day in the city of Boston. This new holiday, which started on the 20th anniversary of Roy's injury, was created to celebrate how Roy “has gone on to inspire not only the college hockey world, but people across the country thanks to his efforts with the Travis Roy Foundation.”

In 2016, Roy received an honorary Doctorate in Humane Letters from Boston University. His degree was earned due to his humanitarian work to help those with spinal cord injuries through fundraising for research, equipment, and fighting for legislation.

== Personal life and death ==
After graduating from Boston University with a degree in communications, Roy permanently moved to Boston, Massachusetts. He cited the independence he was able to have in the city as the reason for the move. While this move gave him more freedom than he would have had in his hometown, he still required home aides around the clock to help him with daily activities such as getting dressed, taking his medicine, and eating.

Roy and Sports Illustrated writer E.M. Swift wrote his autobiography, Eleven Seconds, in 1998. Roy's book outlines his life before and after his injury, focusing on the devastation his injury brought him as well as the perseverance and fortitude he exhibited afterward. The book's title refers to the amount of time Roy spent playing for Boston University before his injury.

Roy died on October 29, 2020, at the age of 45, of complications from a recent surgery.

== See also ==
- Luděk Čajka
