= Haley Bennett (musician) =

American musician

Haley Bennett (born 1992) is an American conductor, music director and arranger. In 2021, she was named one of Broadway's Women to Watch.

== Early life ==
Haley Bennett was born to Peter and Sandy Bennett and grew up in Cumberland, Maine, where she attended North Yarmouth Academy. She graduated from Harvard University with a B.A. in psychology; where she also minored in theater and French. In May 2025, Bennett was the commencement speaker at her alma mater, North Yarmouth Academy.

== Career ==
Bennett began her music career working on the 2014 pre-Broadway production of Finding Neverland at American Repertory Theater (ART). She became music assistant to David Chase when the show moved to Broadway at the Lunt-Fontanne Theatre in March 2015. Bennett worked again with Chase on Peter Pan Live! for NBC.

Bennett has served on the music team for several Broadway musicals including, Come From Away, Dear Evan Hansen and & Juliet. She was working as associate music director and associate conductor for the musical Diana during previews when COVID-19 pandemic shut down all Broadway productions. The musical opened on Broadway at the Longacre Theatre on November 17, 2021. Bennett has conducted workshops as a vocal teacher for Broadway Weekends and also Maestra. In December 2024, she coached Supreme Court Justice Ketanji Brown Jackson for her Broadway debut in & Juliet. Bennett recently served as associate music supervisor for Redwood under Tom Kitt.

As album and recording coordinator, Bennett has worked on several original Broadway cast recordings, including Diana: A True Musical Story, Once on This Island (2017), Anastasia and MJ the Musical. Bennett contracts summer productions at the Ogunquit Playhouse, including Escape to Margaritaville, Waitress, Come from Away and the world premiere of Mystic Pizza (2021). She has previously worked on the Radio City Christmas Spectacular as an Associate Music Contractor and other projects for NBC.

== Filmography ==
| Year | Title | Role |
|---|---|---|
| 2014 | Peter Pan Live! | Music associate |
| 2018 | Jesus Christ Superstar Live in Concert | Music associate |
| 2021 | Diana | Associate Conductor / associate musical director |
| 2021 | Schmigadoon! | Music coordinator |

== Stage ==
| Year | Title | Role |
|---|---|---|
| 2017 | Once on This Island | music associate / assistant vocal arranger / additional orchestrations |
| 2018 | Diana, The Musical | associate Conductor / associate music director |
| 2018 | & Juliet | associate music supervisor / associate Conductor / associate music director |
| 2025 | Redwood | associate Music Supervisor |
