= Academy Hall (North Yarmouth Academy) =

- U.S. Historic district – Contributing property
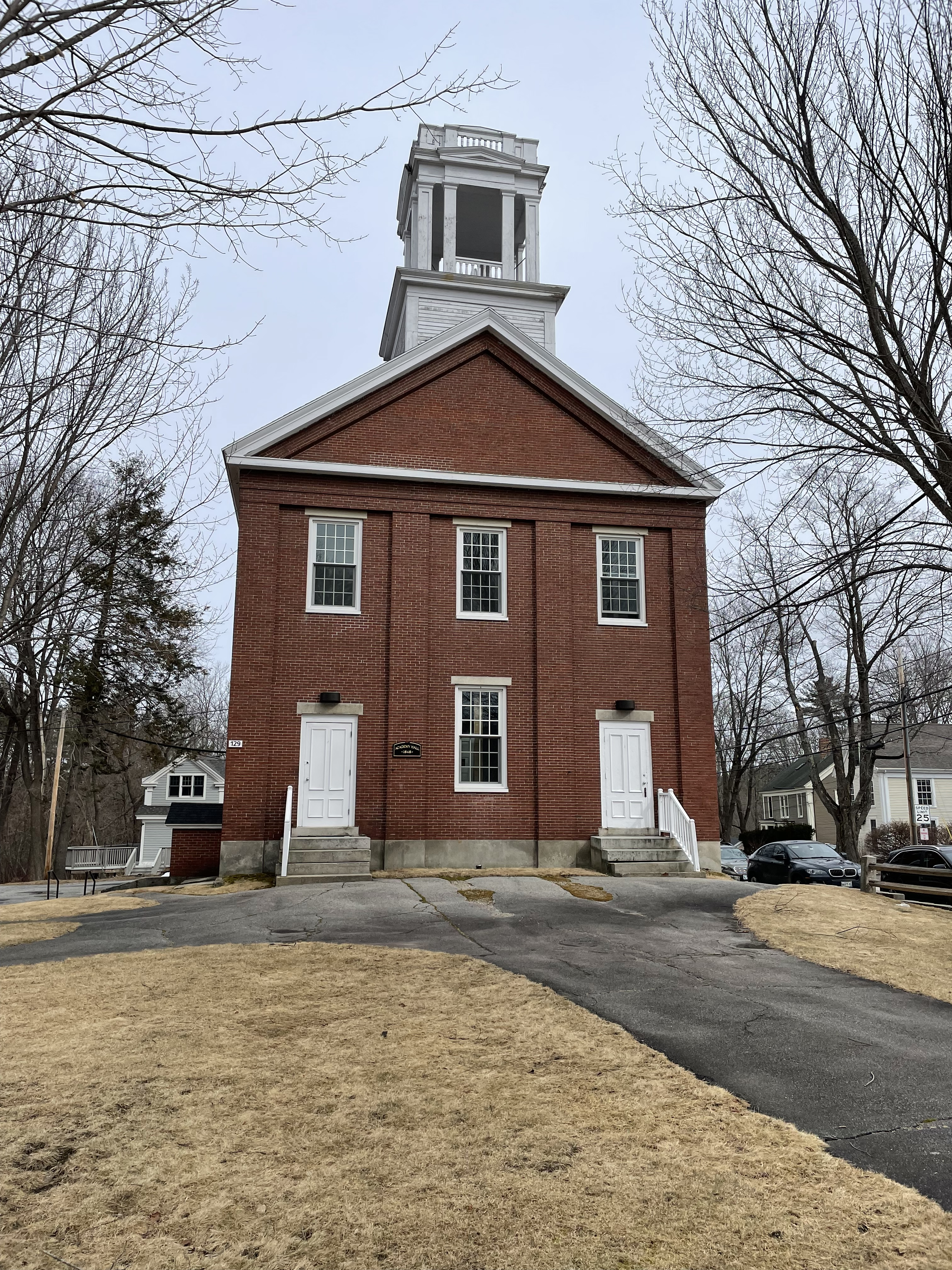
- The building in 2022

- Location within Maine Location within the United States
- Location: 129 Main Street, Yarmouth, Maine
- Coordinates: 43°47′59″N 70°11′01″W
- Built: 1848 (178 years ago)
- Architectural style: Greek Revival
- Part of: North Yarmouth Academy (ID75000097)
- Designated CP: March 4, 1975

Academy Hall is one of the main annex buildings on the campus of North Yarmouth Academy (NYA) in Yarmouth, Maine, United States. Completed in 1848, the building was listed on the National Register of Historic Places in 1975. It stands immediately to the east of Russell Hall at the corner of Main Street and Bridge Street. The building was originally built for use as a classroom for NYA, which was established in 1814.

The original two-story wooden 1811 NYA school building was removed a few yards to the adjacent Bridge Street. It stood "just below the residence of the late Charles O. Rowe," the father of William Hutchinson Rowe, roughly where number 28 Bridge Street, built in 1860, is today.

The south-facing façade of the building is topped by a Greek Revival belvedere. The east and west side walls of the building are identical. The terrain on which it stands slopes away to the north, towards the Royal River, revealing the above-ground brick foundation on the sides and at the rear.

== See also ==
- National Register of Historic Places listings in Cumberland County, Maine
