= 1860 Republican National Convention =

United States presidential nominating convention

- 1860 presidential election
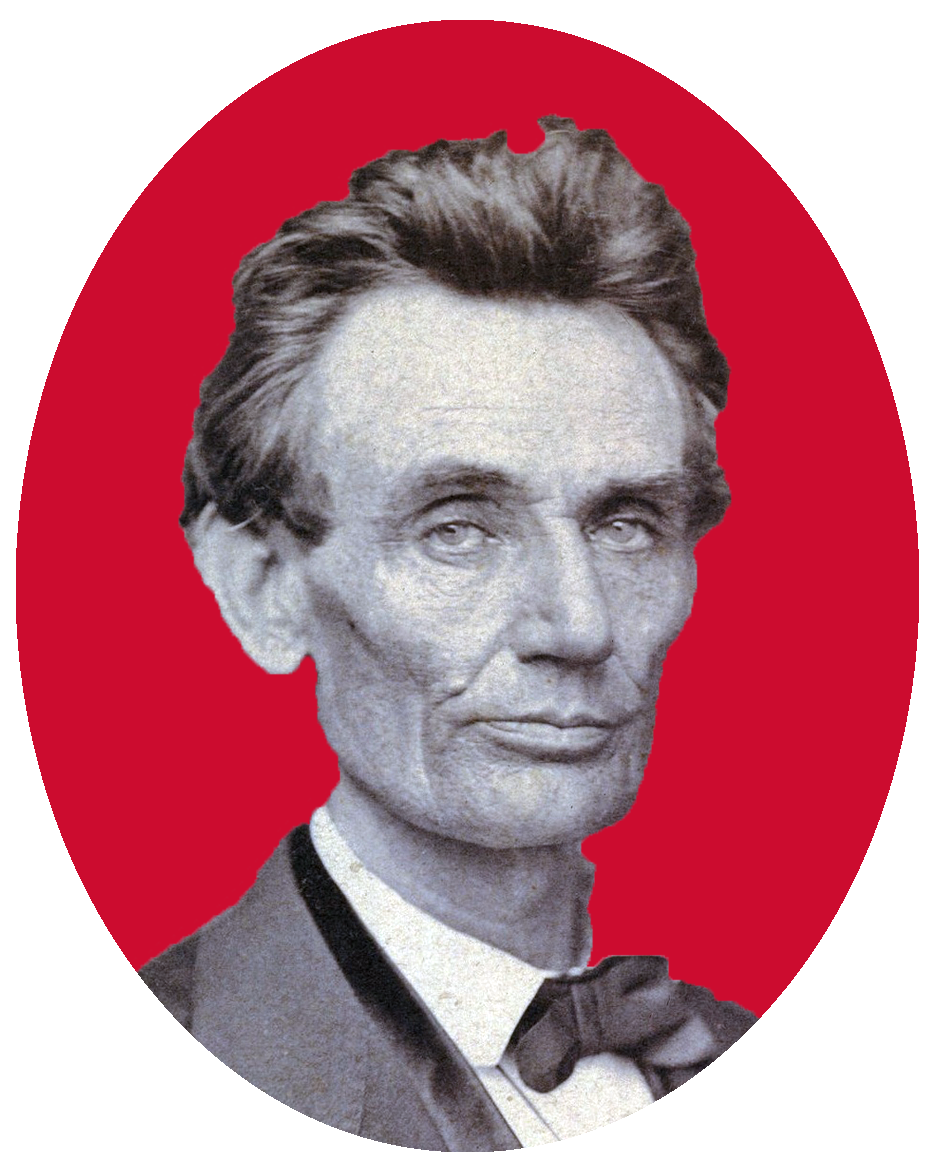
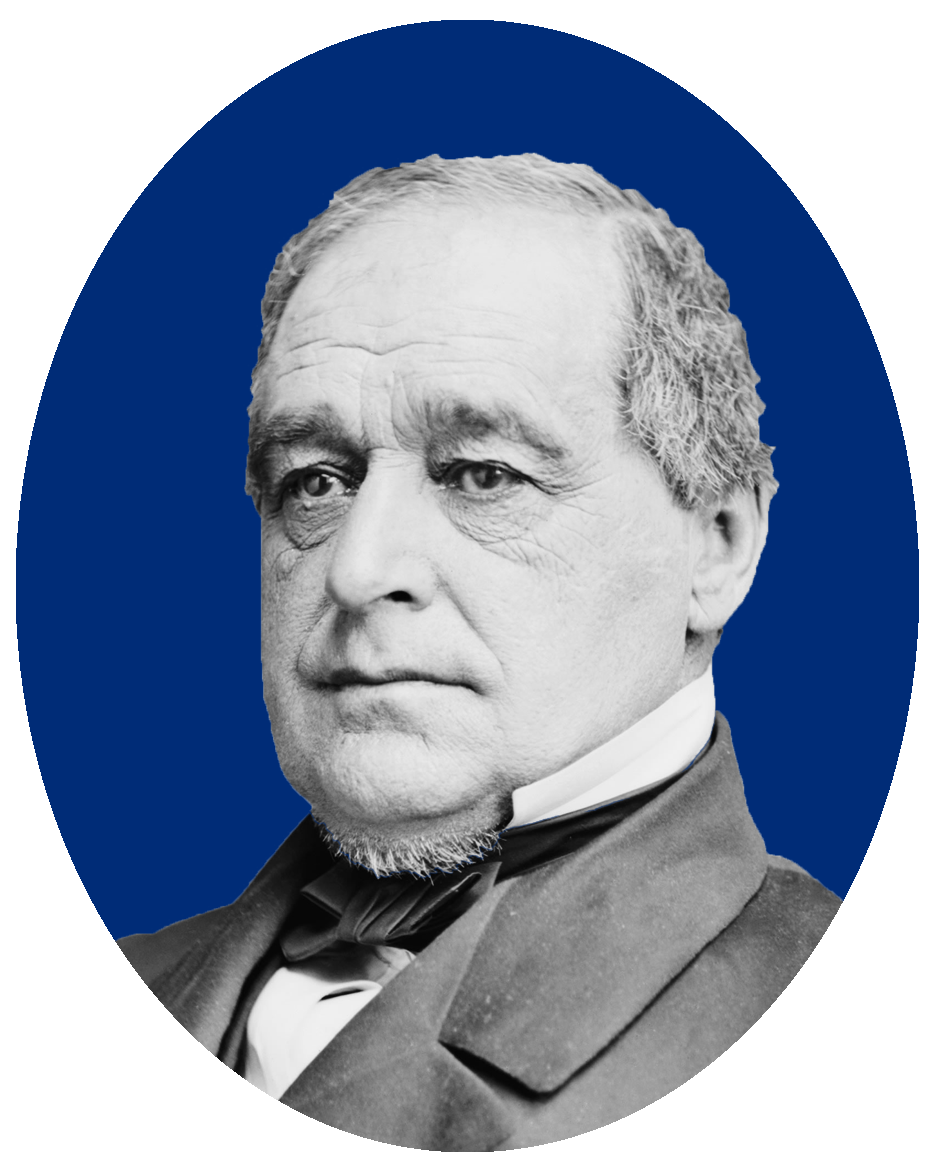
- Nominees; Lincoln and Hamlin

Convention
- Date(s): May 16–18, 1860
- City: Chicago, Illinois
- Venue: The Wigwam

Candidates
- Presidential nominee: Abraham Lincoln of Illinois
- Vice-presidential nominee: Hannibal Hamlin of Maine
- Other candidates: William H. Seward

The 1860 Republican National Convention was a presidential nominating convention that met May 16–18 in Chicago, Illinois. It was held to nominate the Republican Party's candidates for president and vice president in the 1860 election. The convention selected former representative Abraham Lincoln of Illinois for president and Senator Hannibal Hamlin of Maine for vice president.

Entering the 1860 convention, Senator William H. Seward of New York was generally regarded as the front-runner, but Lincoln, Governor Salmon P. Chase of Ohio, former representative Edward Bates of Missouri, and Senator Simon Cameron of Pennsylvania all commanded support from a significant share of delegates. Seward led on the first ballot but fell short of a majority, while Lincoln finished in a strong second place. Cameron's delegates shifted to Lincoln on the second ballot, leaving Lincoln essentially tied with Seward. Lincoln clinched the nomination on the third ballot after consolidating support from more delegates who had backed candidates other than Seward.

Hamlin was nominated on the second vice presidential ballot, defeating Cassius Clay of Kentucky and several other candidates.

The ticket of Lincoln and Hamlin went on to win the 1860 general election. After taking office in 1861, Lincoln appointed all four of his major opponents to his cabinet: Seward for secretary of state, Chase for secretary of the treasury (and later for chief justice), Bates for attorney general, and Cameron for secretary of war.

== History ==
=== Background ===
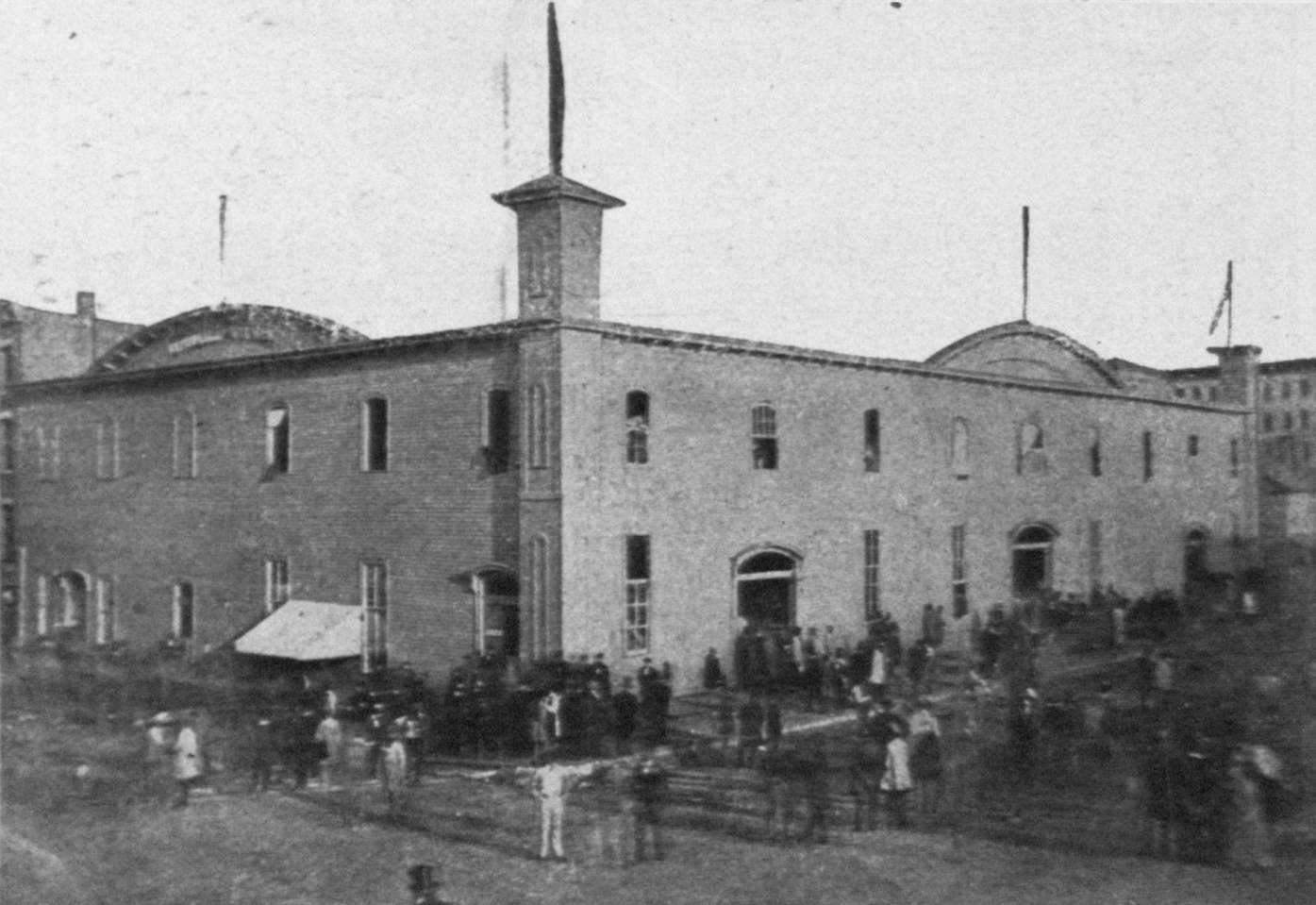
Wood-frame "Wigwam" building specially designed for the 1860 Republican Convention in Chicago

By 1860 the dissolution of the Whig Party in America had become an accomplished fact, with establishment Whig politicians, former Free Soilers, and a certain number of anti-Catholic populists from the Know Nothing movement flocking to the banner of the fledgling anti-slavery Republican Party. While 1856 Republican presidential nominee John C. Frémont had met with failure, party gains were made throughout the Northern United States as the sectional crisis over slavery intensified.

Horace Greeley, Ebenezer R. Hoar, and Edwin D. Morgan were interested in holding the 1860 convention in a border state. Party leaders sought to hold their 1860 nominating convention in the burgeoning Middle Western trade center of Chicago, then a city of some 110,000 people. The city had no sufficiently large meeting hall, so an appropriation was made for a temporary wood-frame assembly hall – known as the "Wigwam" – to seat ten thousand delegates, guests, and observers. The rapidly designed and constructed building proved well fit for the purpose, featuring excellent lines of sight and stellar acoustics, allowing even an ordinary speaker to be heard throughout the room.

The Convention commanded the interest and attention of a multitude of curious citizens who crowded the "Wigwam" to the rafters. Delegations were seated by state and the gathering was virtually devoid of Southern participation, with no delegations attending from the slave states of North Carolina, South Carolina, Tennessee, Arkansas, Georgia, Alabama, Mississippi, Louisiana, and Florida.

Delegation voting strength was loosely based upon the size of each state's congressional delegation, subject to some modification by the Credentials Committee, with the Northeastern delegations of New York (70), Pennsylvania (54), Massachusetts (26), and New Jersey (14) constituting the largest regional block, surpassing the Midwestern states of Ohio (46), Indiana (26), Illinois (22), and Iowa (8). Some 86 votes were apportioned to the six states of New England. Slave and border states with substantial delegations under the rules (but with small actual party organizations) included Kentucky (23), Virginia (23), and Missouri (18). The total of all credentialed delegate votes was 466.

=== Daily affairs ===
With the convention called to order on May 16, former U.S. Representative David Wilmot of Pennsylvania was elected temporary chairman of the gathering. He had been the author in 1848 of the Wilmot Proviso which would have banned slavery from new states incorporated into the Union. Upon his election, Wilmot delivered the keynote speech to the convention, in which he declared that:

A great sectional and aristocratic party, or interest, has for years dominated with a high hand over the political affairs of this country. That interest has wrested, and is now wresting, all the great powers of this government to the one object of the extension and nationalization of slavery. It is our purpose, gentlemen, it is the mission of the Republican Party and the basis of its organization, to resist this policy of a sectional interest.... It is our purpose and our policy to resist these new constitutional dogmas that slavery exists by virtue of the constitution wherever the banner of the Union floats.

Organizational tasks filled the rest of the first day's activities, including the appointment of a Credentials Committee and a Resolutions Committee. There were no contested seats although a delegation purporting to represent the state of Texas was ruled ineligible by the Credentials Committee. A Platform Committee was also named, including one delegate from every state and territory in attendance. This committee began its work at once and completed its task with a report on the evening of the second day, May 17.

=== Platform ===
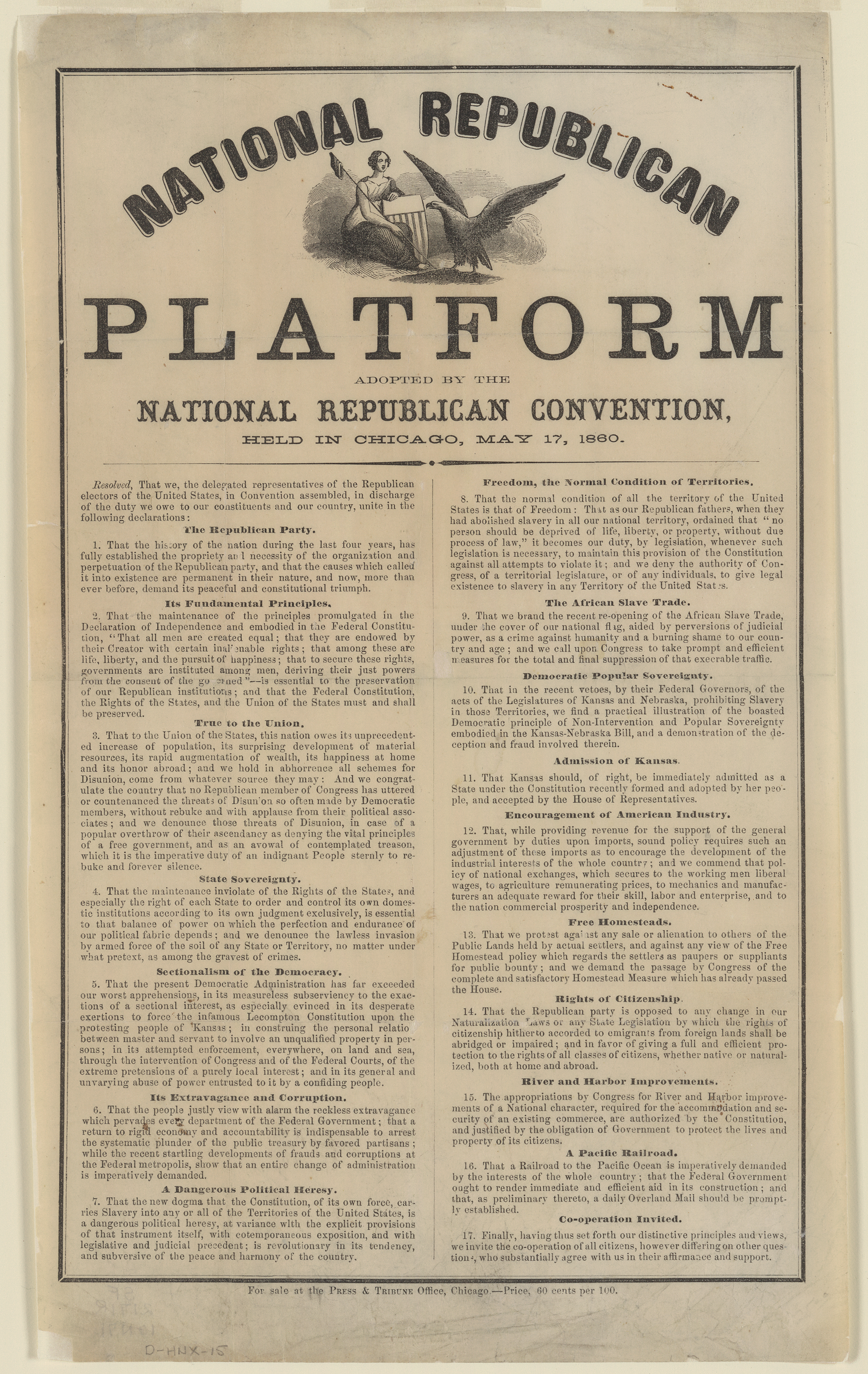
1860 Republican Platform

The platform was drawn up by the Platform Committee chaired by Judge William Jessup of Pennsylvania. The reading of the platform was received with stormy applause and an immediate move followed to adopt the document unanimously and without amendments. US Representative Joshua Reed Giddings of Ohio proposed an amendment to insert the famous language from the Declaration of Independence that "All men are created equal; and they are endowed by their Creator with certain inalienable rights..." This amendment was initially rejected by the convention, prompting Giddings to walk out. The matter was hastily reconsidered by the convention, and with the addition of the amendment the disgruntled Mr. Giddings returned to his seat, crisis resolved.

The 1860 Republican platform consisted of 17 declarations of principle, of which 10 dealt directly with the issues of "free soil", slavery, the Fugitive Slave Act, and the preservation of the Union, while the remaining 7 dealt with other issues.

Clauses 12 through 16 of the platform called for a protective tariff, enactment of the Homestead Act, maintaining the current naturalization laws and full rights to all "native or naturalized" citizens, internal improvements, and the construction of a Pacific railroad.

In addition to the preservation of the Union, all five of these additional promises were enacted by the Thirty-seventh Congress and implemented by Abraham Lincoln or the presidents who immediately succeeded him.

== Presidential nomination ==
=== Presidential candidates ===
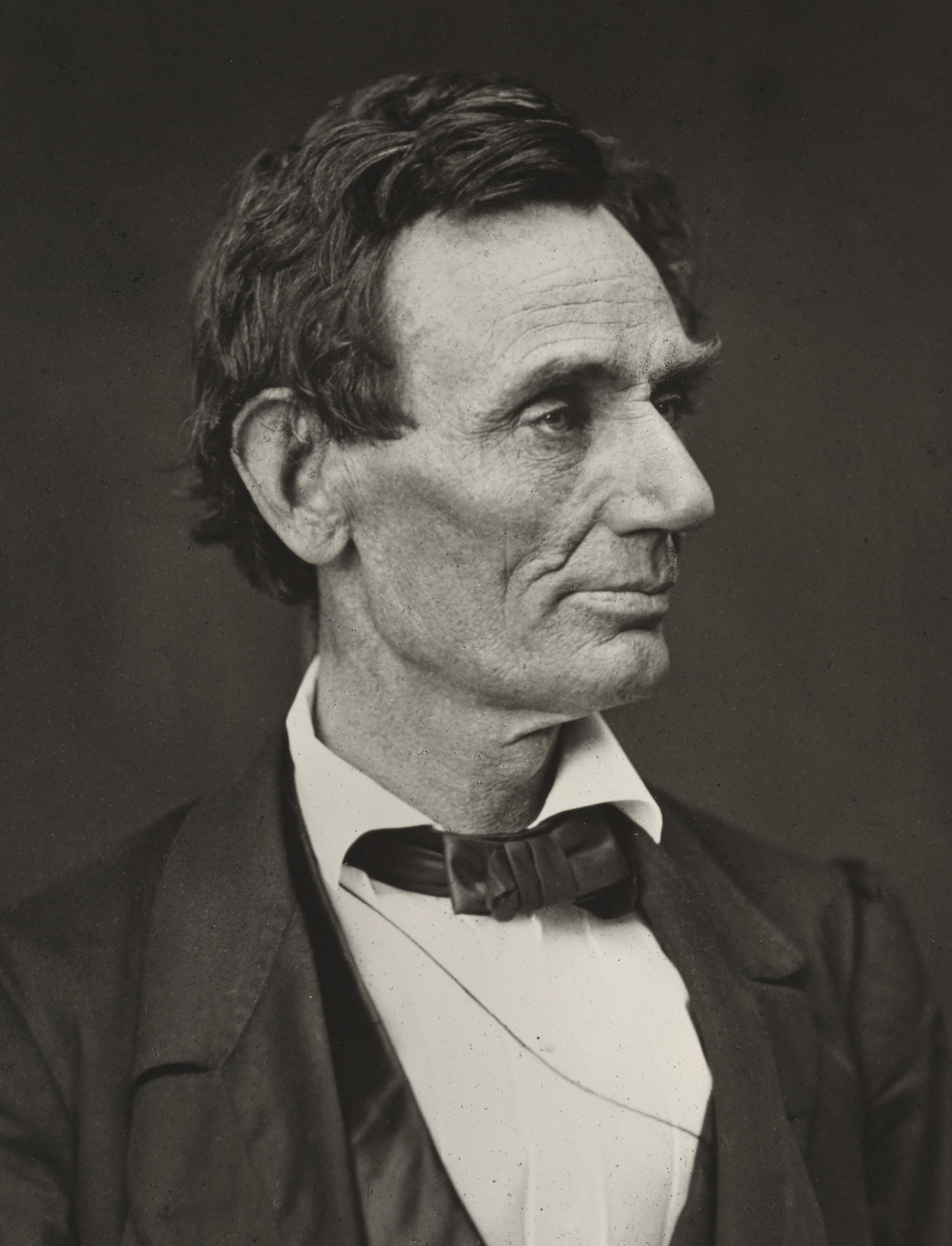
Former Representative
Abraham Lincoln
of Illinois

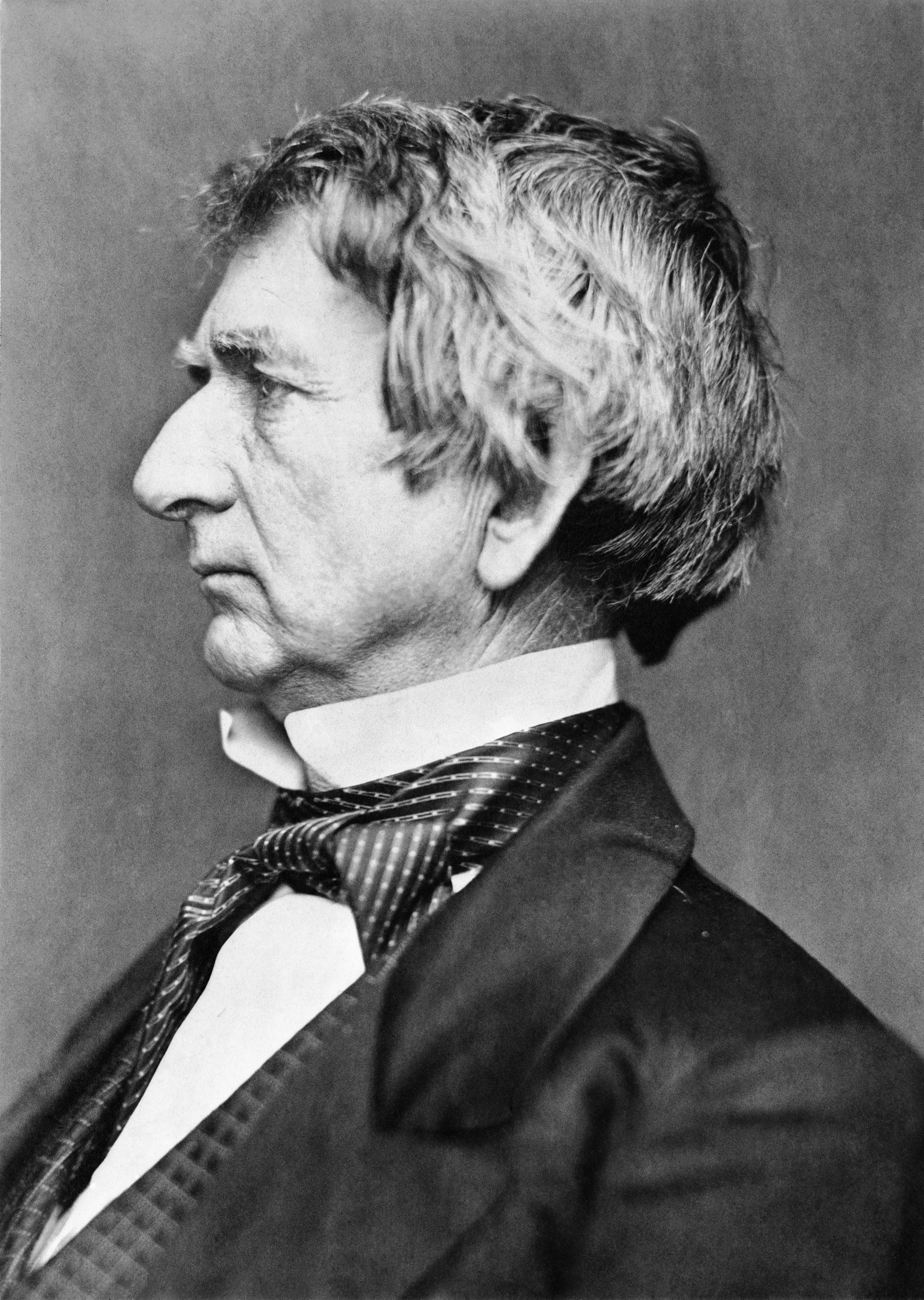
Senator
William H. Seward
of New York

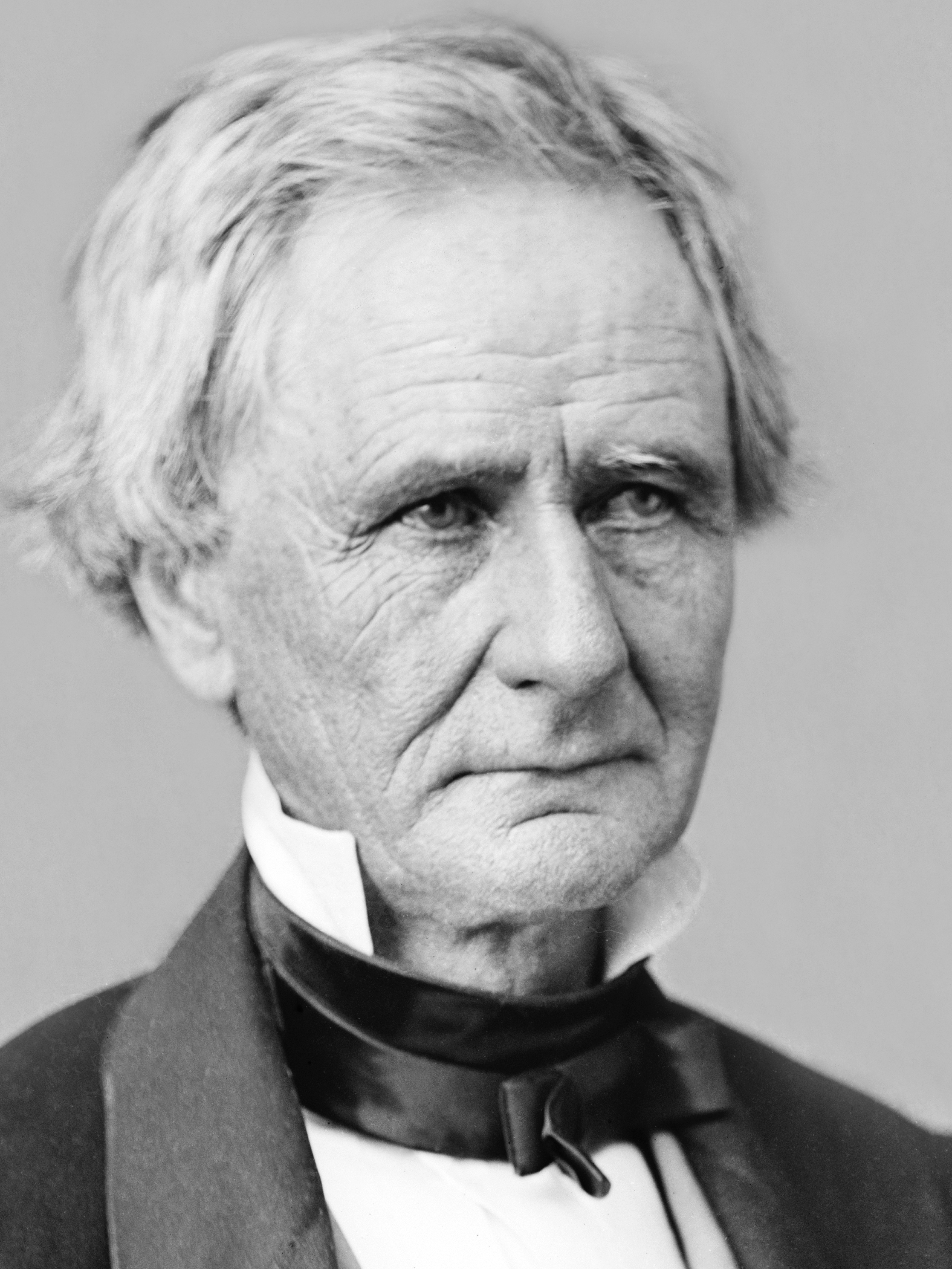
Senator
Simon Cameron
of Pennsylvania

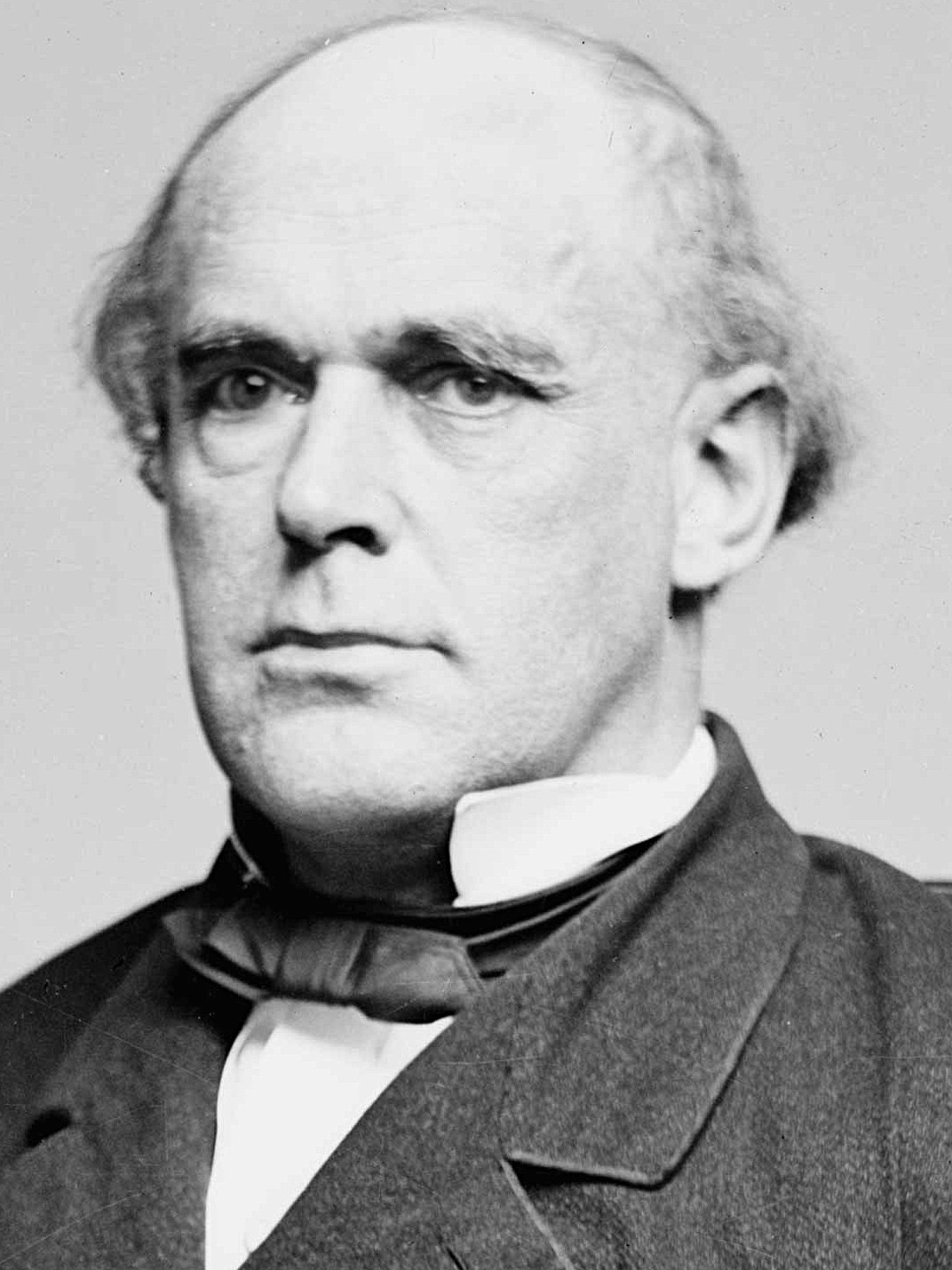
Former Governor
Salmon P. Chase
of Ohio

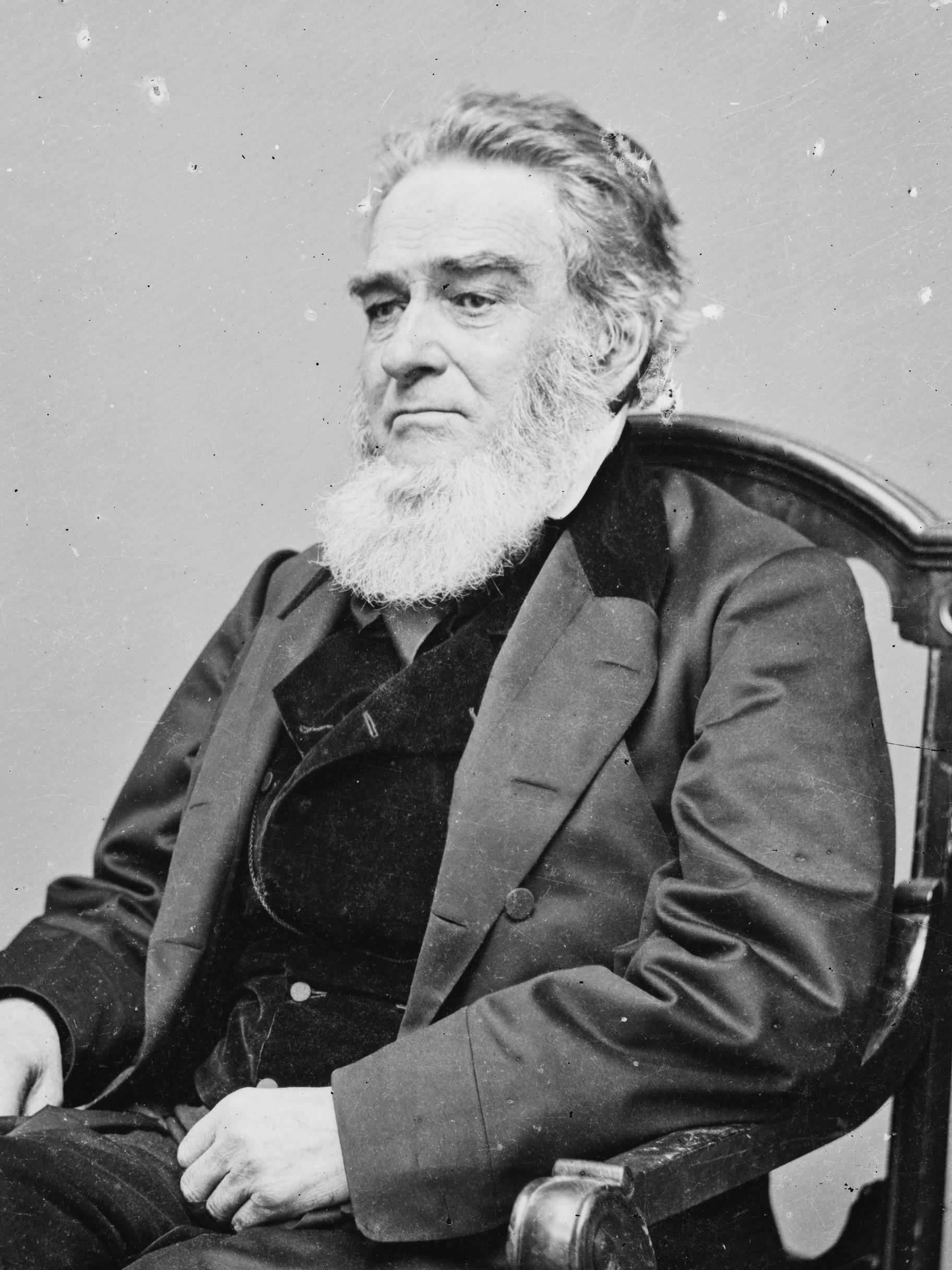
Former Representative
Edward Bates
of Missouri

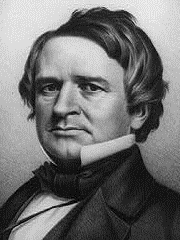
State Attorney General
William L. Dayton
of New Jersey

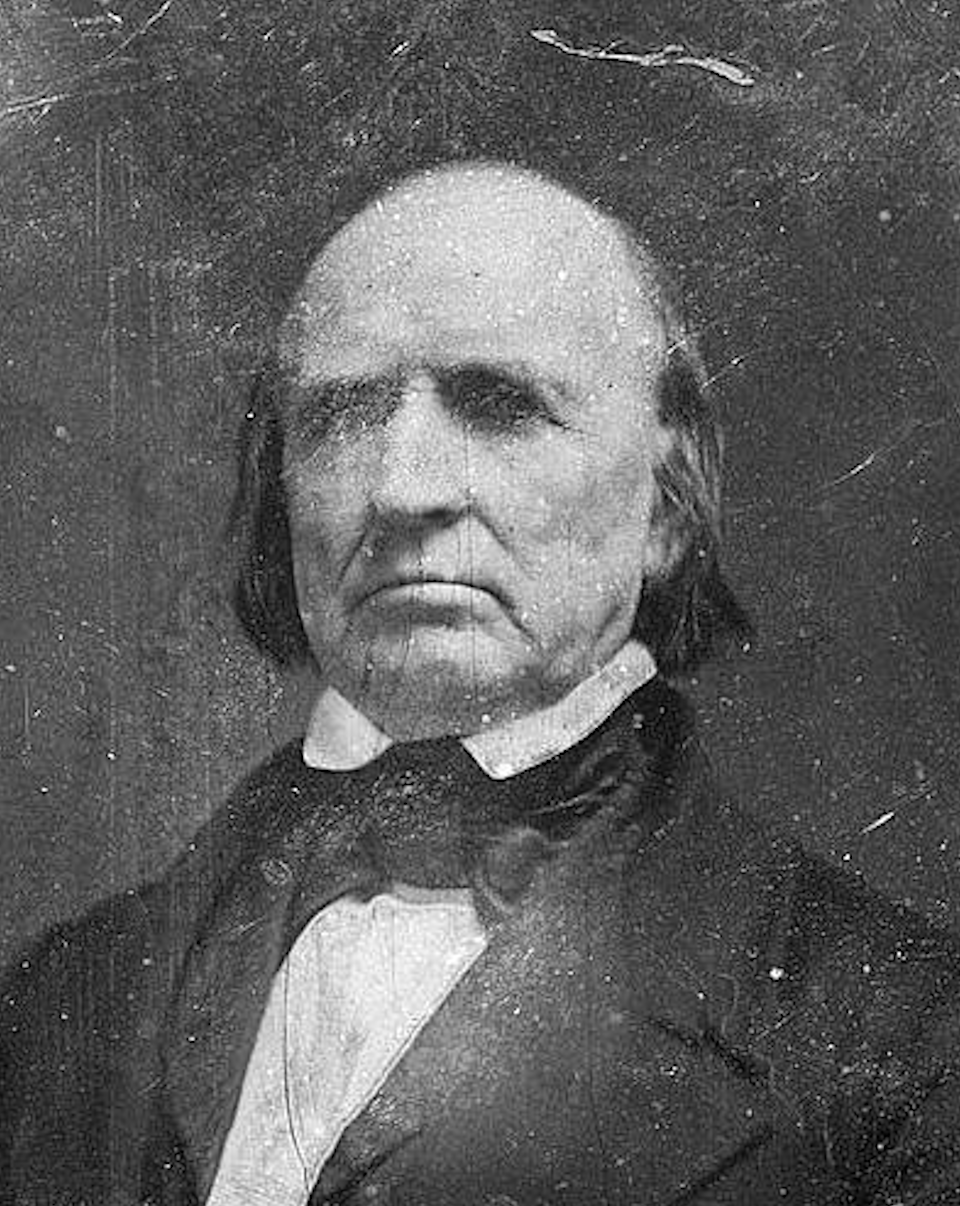
Associate Justice
John McLean
of Ohio

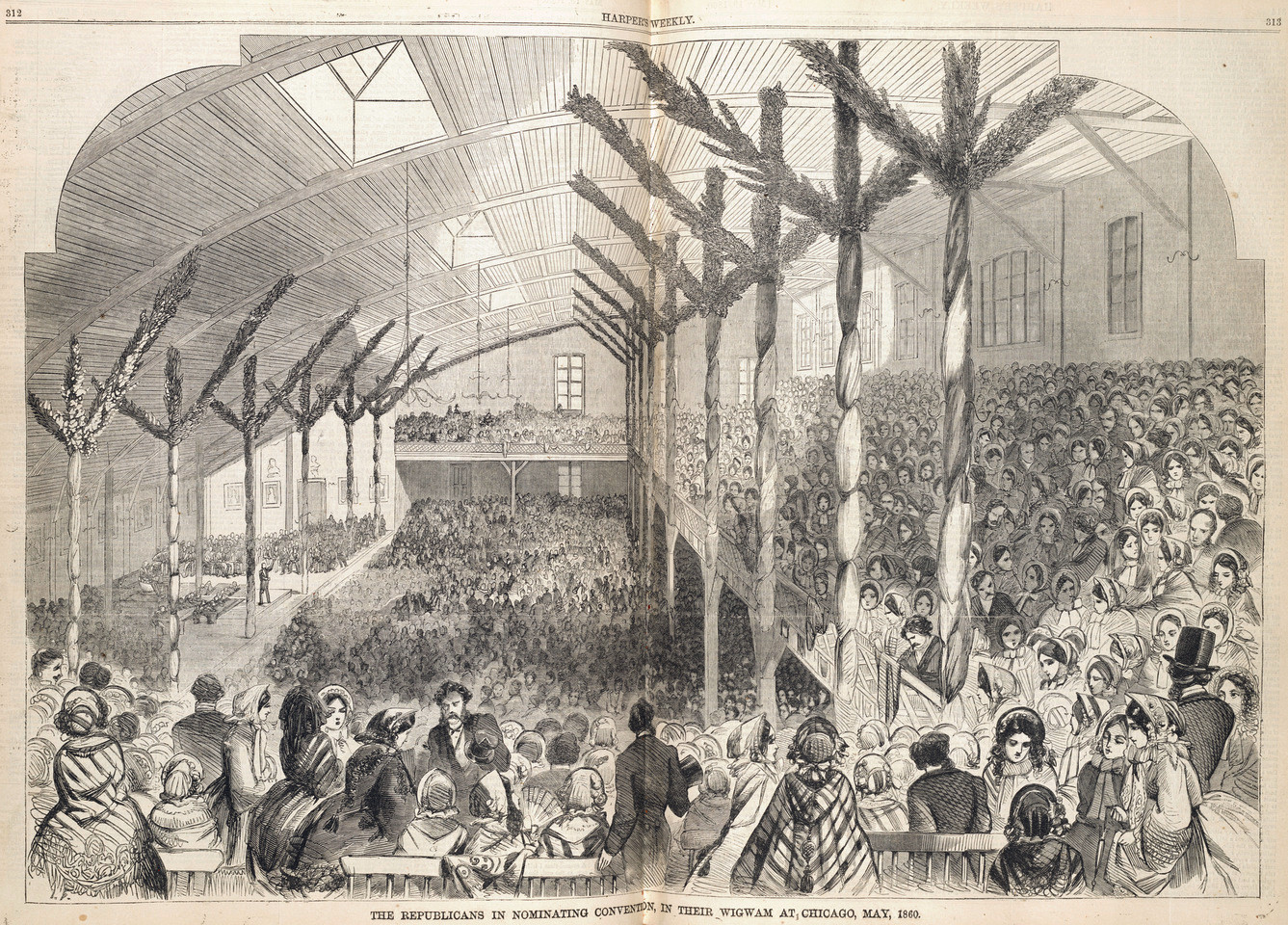
Drawing of the Wigwam interior during the 1860 nominating convention. Note the second story gallery and curved ceiling structure to allow for better acoustics.

The Republican National Convention met in mid-May 1860, after the Democrats had been forced to adjourn their convention in Charleston, South Carolina. With the Democrats in disarray and a sweep of the Northern states possible, the Republicans felt confident going into their convention in Chicago. William H. Seward from New York was considered the front-runner, followed Salmon P. Chase from Ohio, and Missouri's Edward Bates. Abraham Lincoln from Illinois, was lesser known, and was not considered to have a good chance against Seward. Seward had been governor and senator of New York, was from firm Whig backgrounds, and was a very able politician. Also running were John C. Frémont, William L. Dayton, Cassius M. Clay, and Benjamin Wade, who might be able to win if the convention deadlocked.

As the convention developed, however, it was revealed that frontrunners Seward, Chase, and Bates had each alienated factions of the Republican Party. Seward had been painted as a radical, and his speeches on slavery predicted inevitable conflict, which spooked moderate delegates. He also was firmly opposed to nativism, which further weakened his position. He had also been abandoned by his longtime friend and political ally Horace Greeley, publisher of the influential New-York Tribune.

Chase, a former Democrat, had alienated many of the former Whigs by his coalition with the Democrats in the late 1840s. He had also opposed tariffs demanded by Pennsylvania, and even had opposition from his own delegation from Ohio. However, Chase's firm antislavery stance made him popular with the radical Republicans. But what he had in policy he lacked in charisma and political acumen.

Bates' candidacy was pushed by Francis Preston Blair and Francis Preston Blair Jr. despite Bates not being a member of the party. They had the Republican parties of Missouri and Maryland send delegations pledged to Bates. Greeley and Schuyler Colfax were interested in his candidacy, but he failed to receive a large amount of support from northern or border state delegates. The conservative Bates was an unlikely candidate. Bates outlined his positions on the extension of slavery into the territories and equal constitutional rights for all citizens, positions that alienated his supporters in the border states and Southern conservatives, while German Americans in the party opposed Bates because of his past association with the Know Nothings.

Into this mix came Lincoln. Lincoln was not unknown; he had gained prominence in the Lincoln–Douglas debates, and had served as a member of the U.S. House of Representatives from Illinois. He had been quietly eyeing a run since the Lincoln–Douglas debates in 1858, ensuring that the debates were widely published, and that a biography of himself was published. He gained great notability with his February 1860 Cooper Union speech, which may have ensured him the nomination. At that time he had not yet announced his intentions to run, but it was a superb speech. Delivered in Seward's home state, and attended by Greeley, Lincoln used the speech to show that the Republican party was a party of moderates, not crazed fanatics as the South and Democrats claimed. Afterwards, Lincoln was in much demand for speaking engagements. As the convention approached, Lincoln did not campaign very actively, as the "office was expected to seek the man". So it did at the Illinois state convention in downstate Decatur, a week before the national convention. Young politician Richard Oglesby had secretly found several fence rails from the Hanks-Lincoln farm that Lincoln may have split as a youngster, and paraded them into the convention with a banner that proclaimed Lincoln to be "The Rail Candidate" for president. Lincoln received a thunderous ovation, surpassing the expectations of him and his political allies.

Even with such support from his home state, Lincoln faced a difficult task if he was to win the nomination. He set about ensuring that he was the second choice of most delegates, realizing that the first round of voting at the convention was unlikely to produce a clear winner. He engineered that the convention would happen in Chicago, which would be inherently friendly to the Illinois-based Lincoln. He also made sure that the Illinois delegation would vote as a bloc for him. Lincoln did not attend the convention in person, and left the task of delegate wrangling to his friends Leonard Swett, Ward Hill Lamon, and David Davis. Lincoln's team even printed counterfeit convention tickets, which they handed out to his supporters.

During the night of May 17–18, they worked frantically to win anti-Seward delegates for Lincoln. They showed that Lincoln already had the most support after Seward, which persuaded some. They also made a deal with Simon Cameron of Pennsylvania, who recognized that he had no chance of winning the nomination himself. Cameron controlled the Pennsylvania delegation, and he offered to trade his support for the promise of a cabinet position for himself and control of Federal patronage in Pennsylvania. Lincoln did not want to make any such deal; from Springfield, he telegraphed to Davis "I authorize no bargains and will be bound by none". Despite this restriction, Davis reached an understanding with Cameron, which eventually led to Cameron's appointment as Secretary of War.

The next day (May 18), when voting for the nomination began, Seward led on the first ballot with Lincoln a distant second. But on the second ballot, the Pennsylvania delegation switched to Lincoln, as well as some other delegates, putting him in a near-tie with Seward. Lincoln's combination of a moderate stance on slavery, long support for economic issues, his western origins, and strong oratory proved to be exactly what the delegates wanted in a president. On the third ballot on May 18, Lincoln secured the nomination overwhelmingly. Senator Hannibal Hamlin from Maine was nominated for vice-president, defeating Cassius M. Clay. Hamlin was surprised by his nomination, saying he was "astonished" and that he "neither expected nor desired it."

Among other accounts, an article, entitled "The Four Votes", published in the May 19, 1860, edition of the Chicago Press and Tribune attests that after seeing how close Lincoln was to the 234 votes needed, Robert K. Enos, a member of the Ohio delegation, was responsible for getting three fellow Ohio delegates to announce after the close of the third ballot that they were shifting their four votes to Lincoln, giving him sufficient votes to win the nomination. This triggered an avalanche towards Lincoln on the fourth ballot, with a final count of 350 votes for Lincoln out of 466 cast.

Presidential Ballot
Candidate	1st	2nd	3rd (Before Shifts)	3rd (After Shifts)
Lincoln	102	181	231.5	350
Seward	173.5	184.5	180	111.5
Cameron	50.5	2	0	0
Chase	49	42.5	24.5	2
Bates	48	35	22	0
Dayton	14	10	1	1
McLean	12	8	5	0.5
Collamer	10	0	0	0
Wade	3	0	0	0
Clay	0	2	1	1
Frémont	1	0	0	0
Read	1	0	0	0
Sumner	1	0	0	0
Not Represented	152	152	152	152
Not Voting	1	1	1	0

Presidential Balloting / 3rd Day of Convention (May 18, 1860)

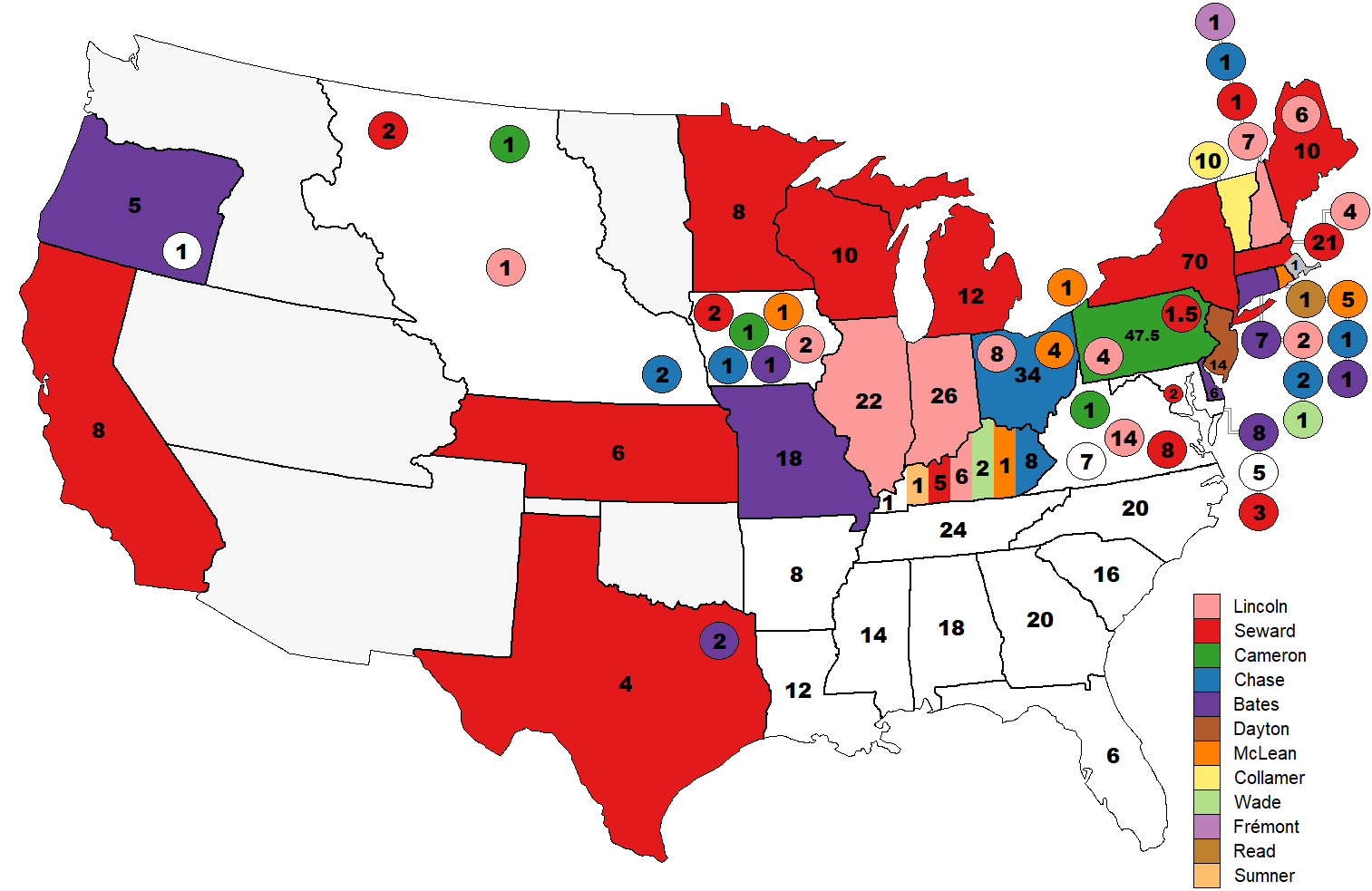
1st
Presidential Ballot

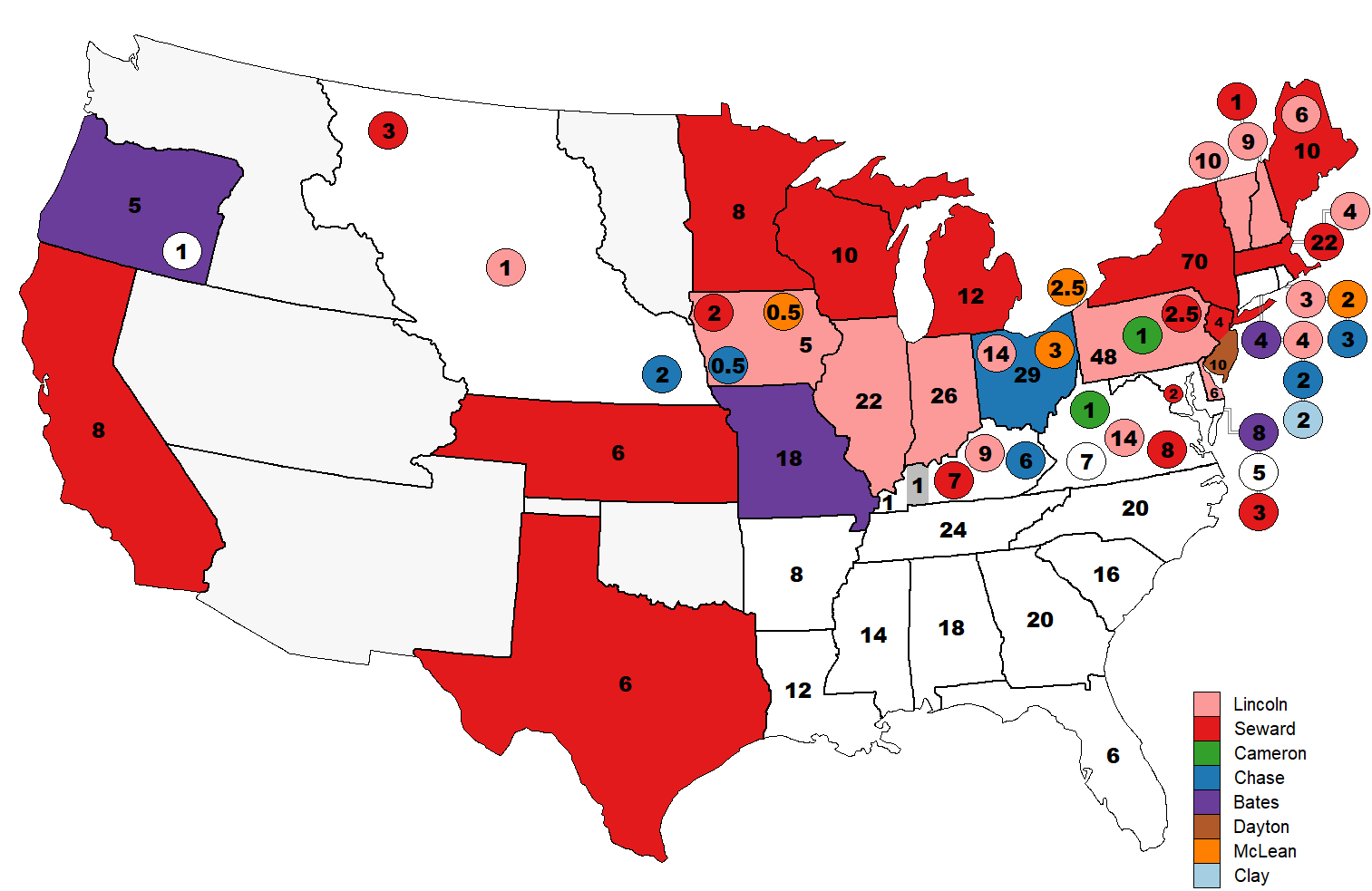
2nd
Presidential Ballot

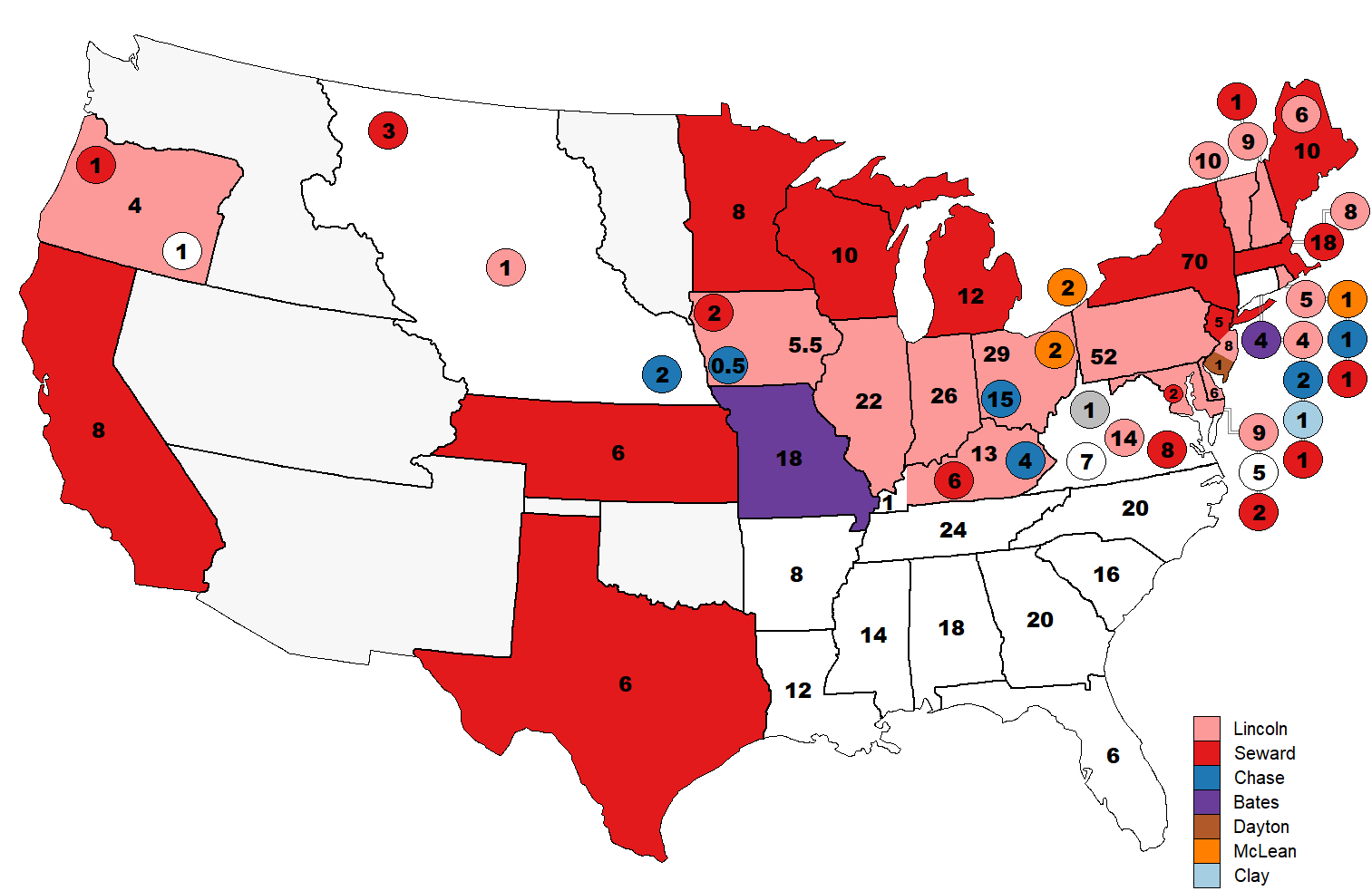
3rd
Presidential Ballot
(Before Shifts)

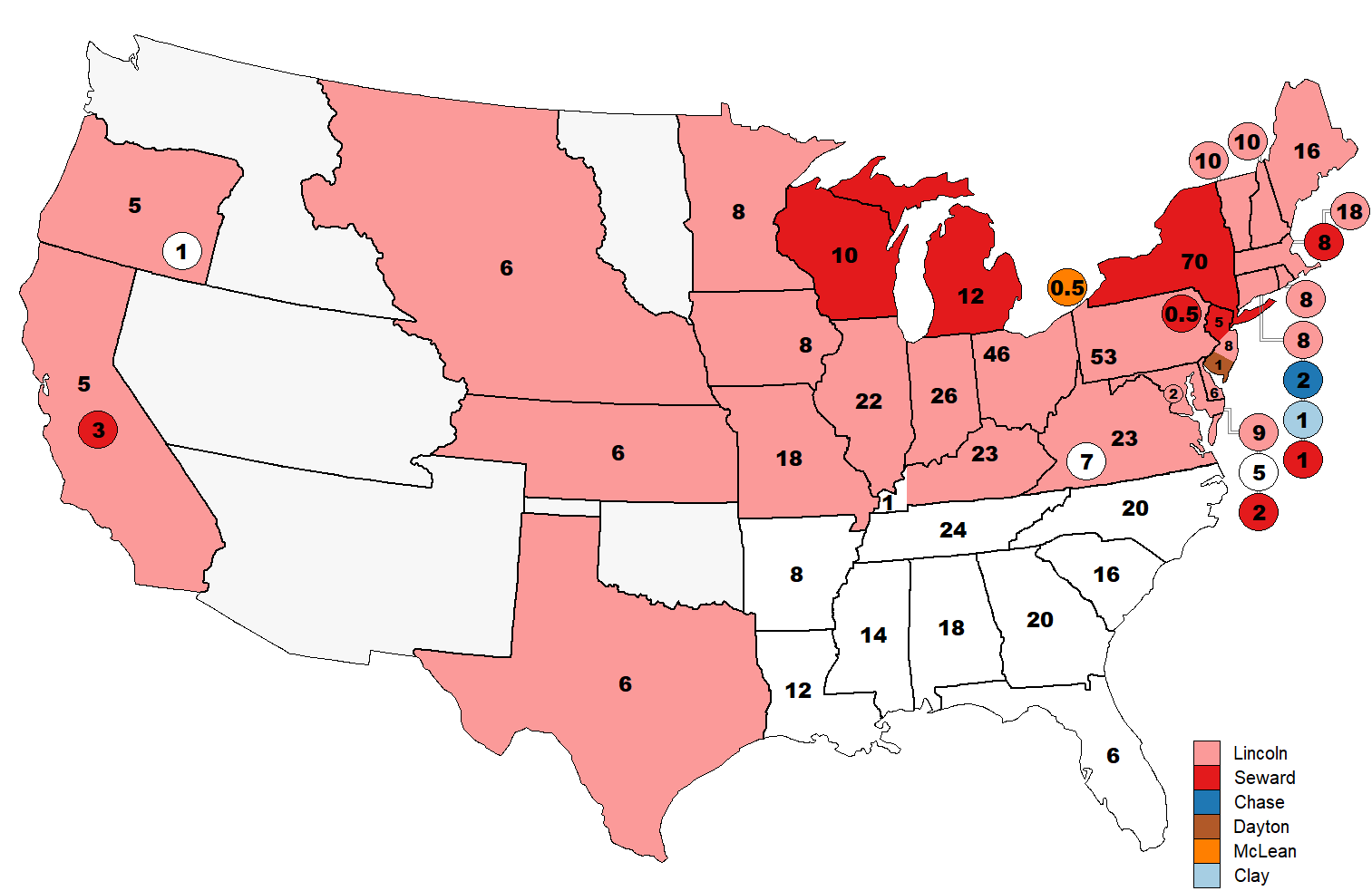
3rd
Presidential Ballot
(After Shifts)

== Vice Presidential nomination ==
=== Vice Presidential candidates ===
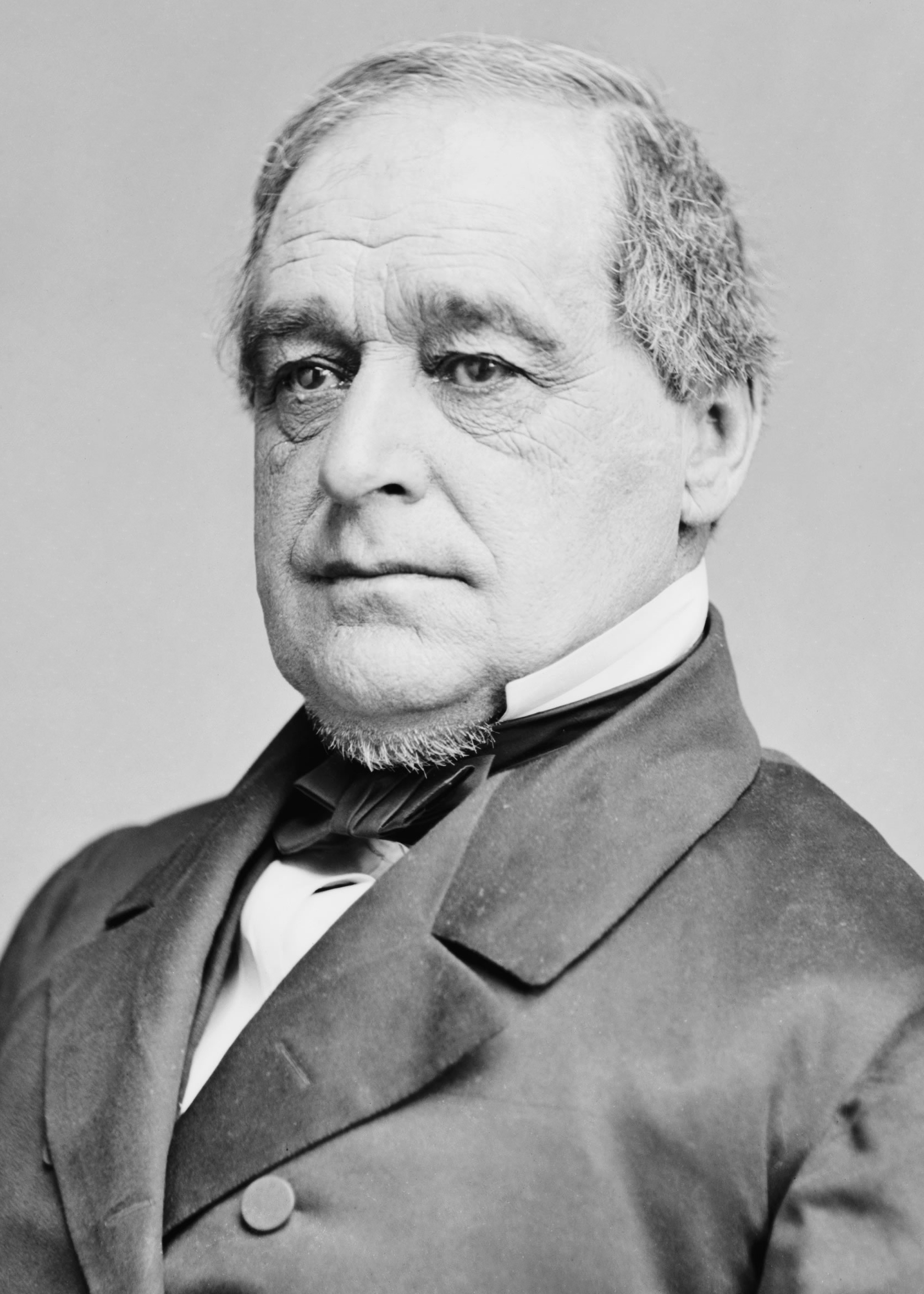
Senator
Hannibal Hamlin
of Maine

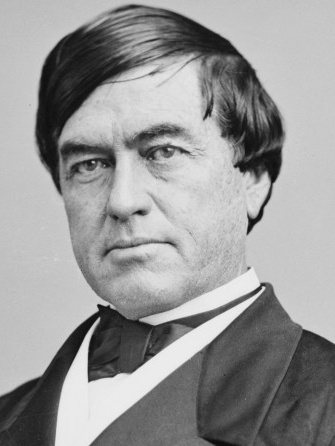
Former
State Representative Cassius M. Clay
of Kentucky

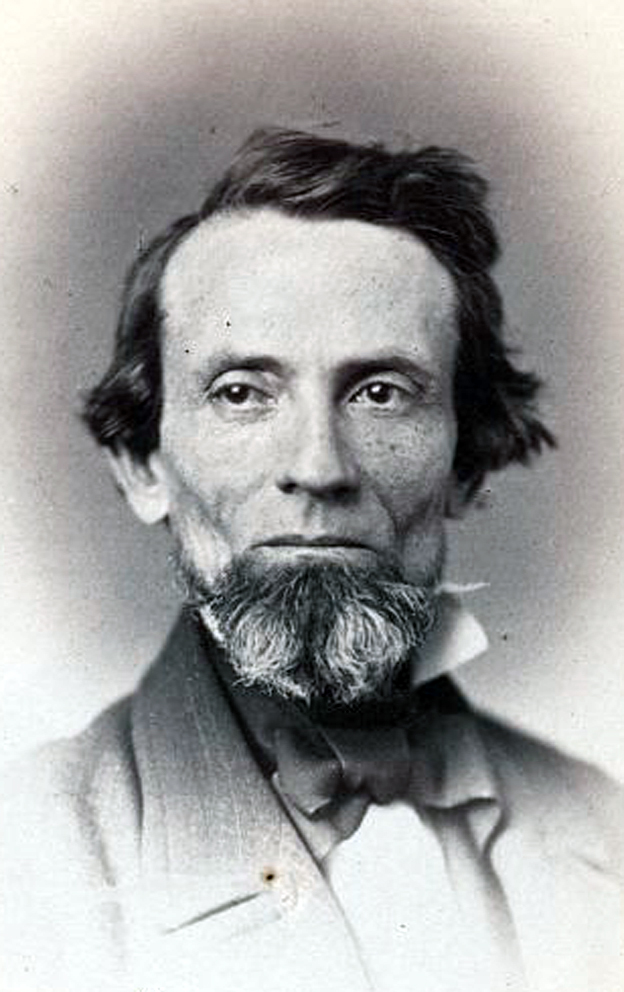
Representative
John Hickman
of Pennsylvania

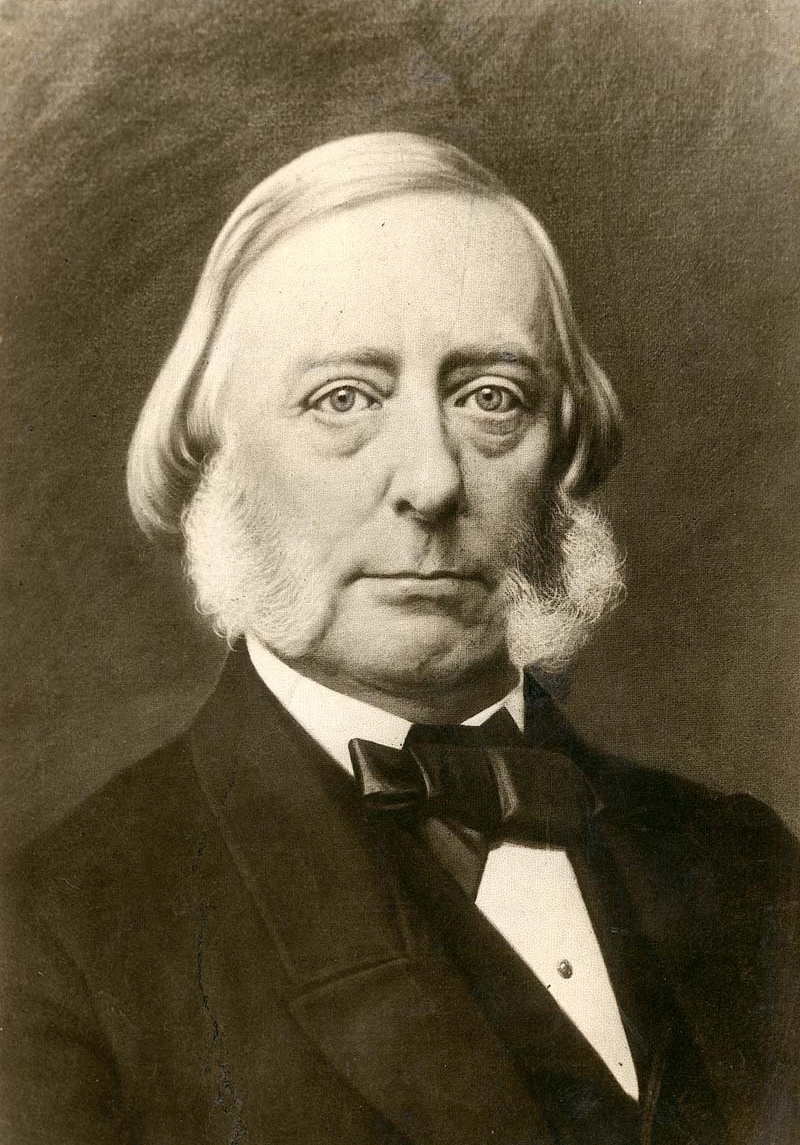
Former Kansas Governor Andrew H. Reeder
of Pennsylvania

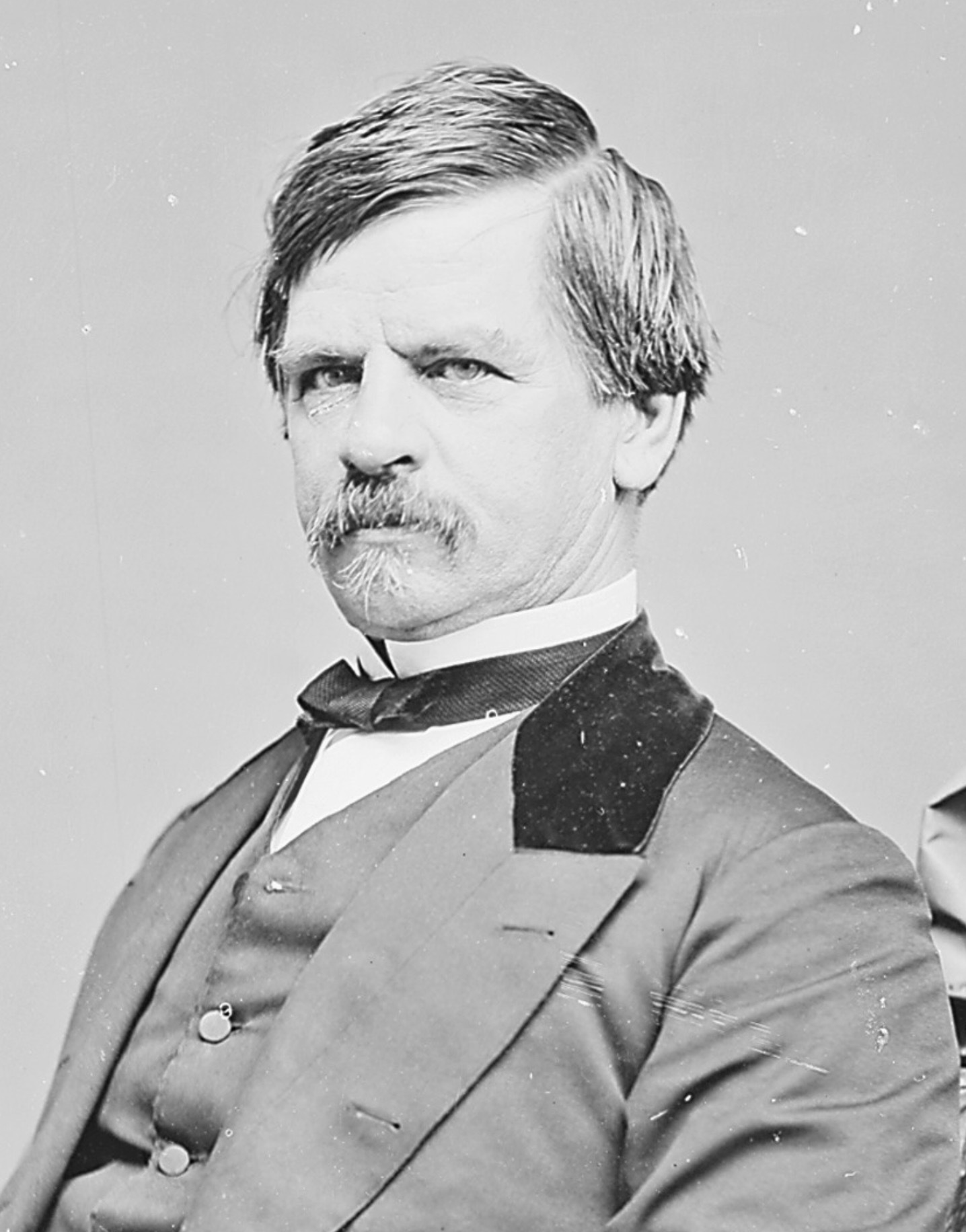
Governor
Nathaniel P. Banks
of Massachusetts

Senator Hannibal Hamlin of Maine was nominated for vice president, defeating Cassius M. Clay of Kentucky.

Vice Presidential Ballot
Candidate	1st	2nd
Hamlin	194	367
Clay	100.5	86
Hickman	57	13
Reeder	51	0
Banks	38.5	0
Davis	8	0
Houston	6	0
Dayton	3	0
Read	1	0
Not Represented	152	152
Not Voting	7	0

Vice Presidential Balloting / 3rd Day of Convention (May 18, 1860)

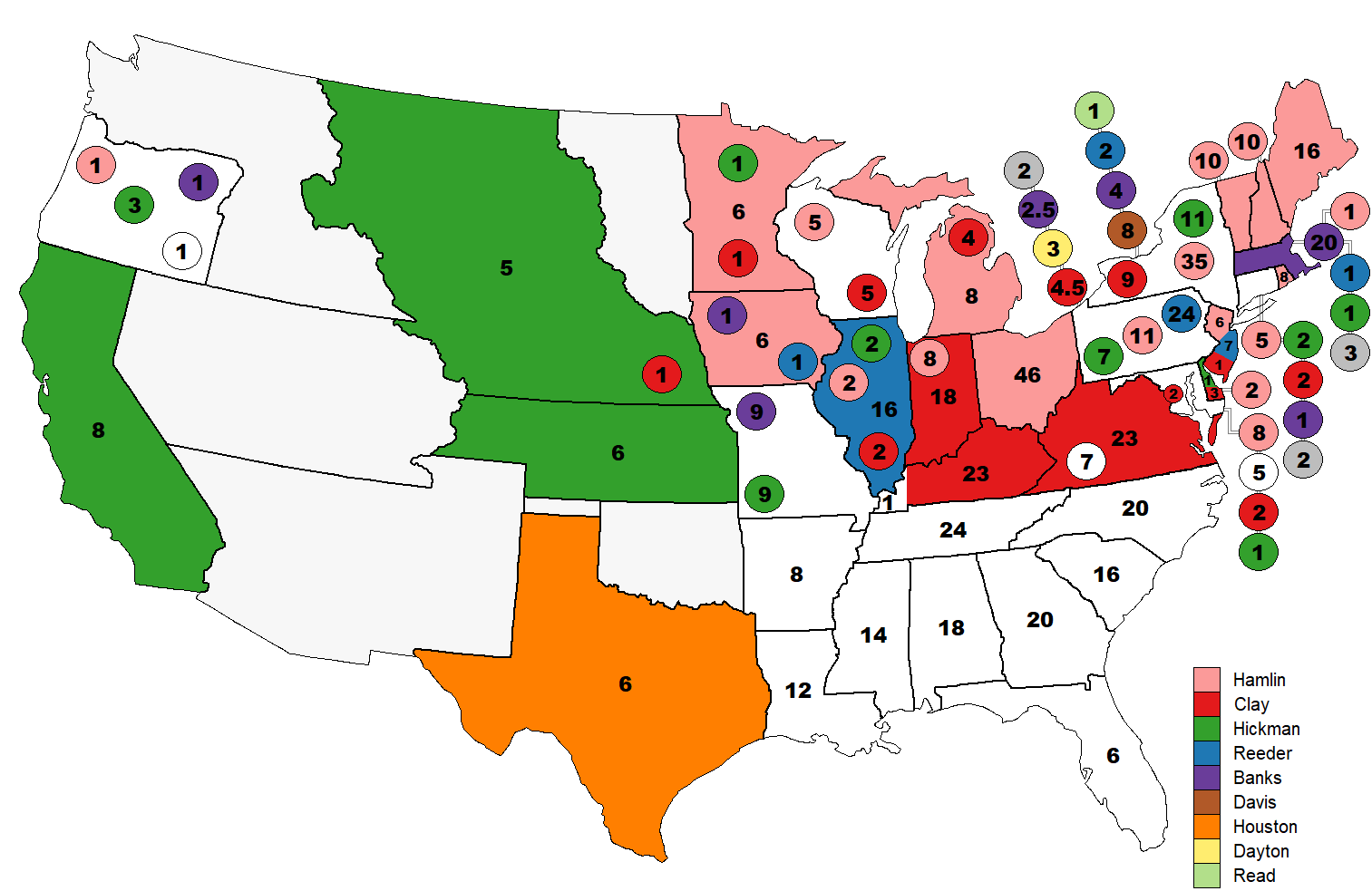
1st
Vice Presidential Ballot

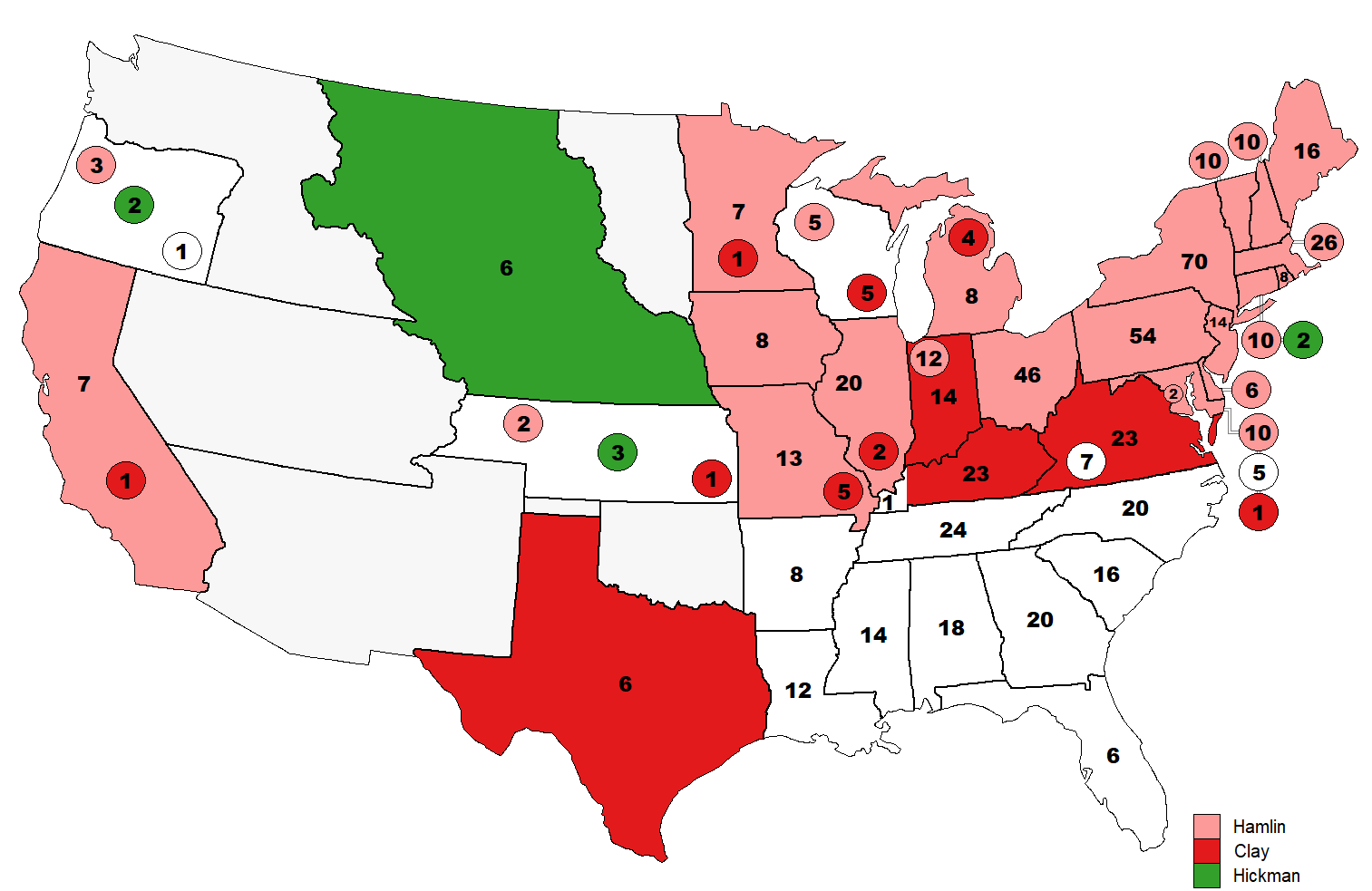
2nd
Vice Presidential Ballot

== See also ==
- 1860 Democratic National Convention
- 1860 United States presidential election
- History of the United States Republican Party
- List of Republican National Conventions
- United States presidential nominating convention
- Wide Awakes
- Wigwam — Chicago venue for the 1860 convention.

== Works cited ==
- Abbott, Richard (1986). The Republican Party and the South, 1855-1877: The First Southern Strategy. University of North Carolina Press. ISBN 0807816809.

Preceded by 1856; Philadelphia	Republican National Conventions	Succeeded by 1864; Baltimore
