= Second Falls (Yarmouth, Maine) =

Waterfall in Yarmouth, Maine

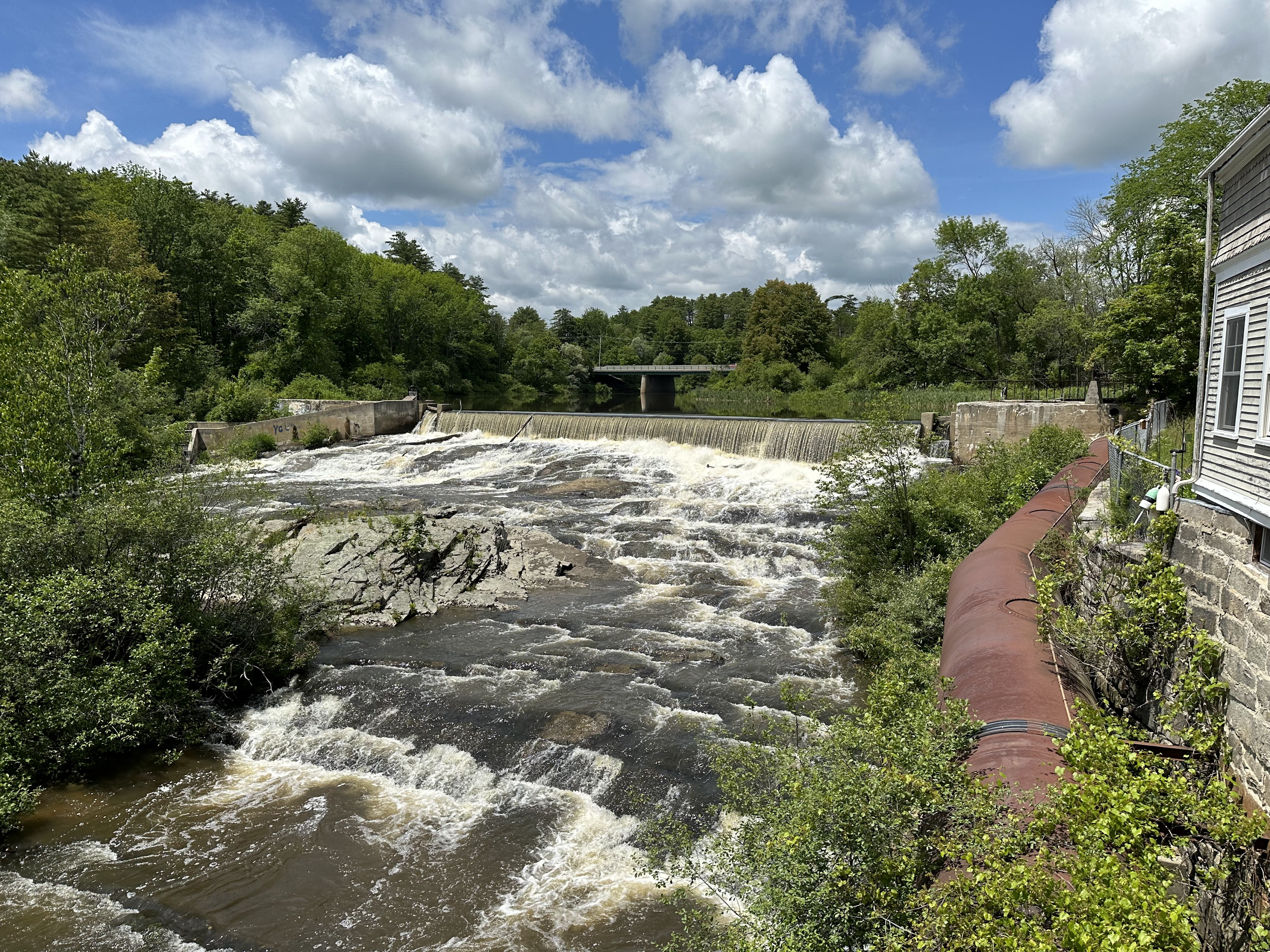
- Looking upstream to the dam from the Bridge Street bridge. The bridge carrying the traffic of U.S. Route 1 is in view in the background
- Interactive map of Second Falls
- Location: Yarmouth, Maine, U.S.
- Coordinates: 43.8016179848091°N 70.18216364°W
- Number of drops: 1
- Watercourse: Royal River

The Second Falls are the second of four waterfalls in Yarmouth, Maine, United States. They are located on the Royal River, approximately 1.35 miles (2.17 km) from its mouth with inner Casco Bay at Yarmouth Harbor, and approximately 0.35 miles (0.56 km) upstream of the First Falls. The river appealed to settlers because its 45-foot rise in close proximity to navigable water each provided potential waterpower sites. As such, each of the four falls was used to power 57 mills between 1674 and the mid-20th century.

In 2025, the town's council voted unanimously to remove the dams at the Second and Fourth Falls to improve ecology. The process to "free the Royal River" began in late July 2026.

== Mills at the Second Falls ==
A variety of mills have used power from the Second Falls. A cotton rag paper mill, run by Massachusetts natives William Hawes and father-and-son duo Henry and George Cox, operated on the falls (western) side of the bridge and the eastern side of the river from 1816 until 1821, at which point it was purchased by William and Calvin Stockbridge, brothers who successfully operated it for twenty years as W. R. & C. Stockbridge, a paper company.

In 1836 it was incorporated as Yarmouth Paper Manufacturing Company, but when advancements in machinery and processes arrived, competition became too difficult and the mill closed. On its site, Philip Kimball later operated a mahogany mill.

The first mill of note to stand where the current Sparhawk Mill looms large was North Yarmouth Manufacturing Company. It was founded in 1847 by Eleazer Burbank, father of physician Augustus Burbank. The mill produced cotton yarn and cloth. Built in 1840, the brick-made mill replaced a wooden mill dating to 1817.

In 1855, the top half of the mill was rebuilt after a fire, but also to accommodate the Royal River Manufacturing Company, which was incorporated in 1857. It was one of the leading industries in Yarmouth, spinning coarse and fine yarn and seamless grain bags, of which it produced up to 1,000 per day. The mill was under the management of H. J. Libby & Company (brothers Harrison, James and Francis Orville Libby) until Barnabas Freeman took over in 1869. Two years later, Freeman joined forces with Lorenzo L. Shaw to start up a cotton mill under the name Freeman, Shaw & Co. After Freeman retired in 1888, Shaw ran the mill on his own until his death in 1907, during which time the mill's tower was completed.

An iron bridge was in place around 1900, replacing an earlier 1846 structure.

Boarding houses, which still exist today at 107 and 109 Bridge Street, were built on the crest of the northern Bridge Street hill, providing accommodation for weavers, seamstresses and bobbin boys.

In 1953, Yale Cordage, owned by Oliver Sherman Yale, occupied the mill. They remained tenants for the next 39 years, until 1992, when the decision was made to divide the mill's interior up into multiple business for extra revenue. The mill received its current name in the early 1950s, when Old Sparhawk Mills Company moved into the building from South Portland. The building is now owned by Sparhawk Group. Formerly headquartered in the mill, they have since moved to Portland, and have regional offices in Faneuil Hall, Boston, and in New York City.

The mill's electric turbines still function, having been revitalized in 1986.

== See also ==
- List of waterfalls
