= First Falls (Yarmouth, Maine) =

Waterfall in Yarmouth, Maine

- Pumgustuk
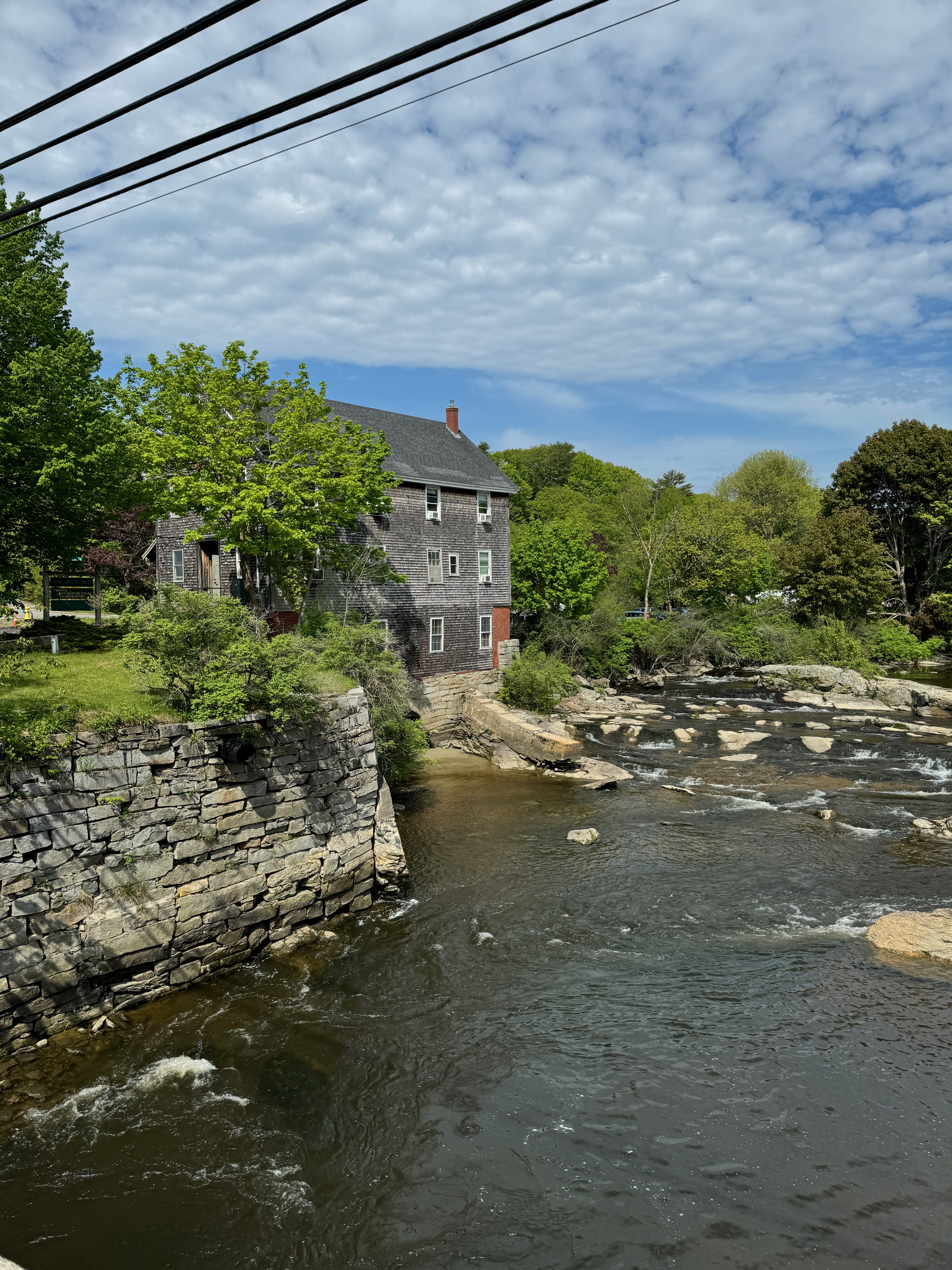
- The falls in 2024
- Interactive map of First Falls
- Location: Yarmouth, Maine, U.S.
- Coordinates: 43.7988606560°N 70.17857211°W
- Number of drops: 1
- Watercourse: Royal River

The First Falls (officially Pumgustuk) are the first of four waterfalls in Yarmouth, Maine, United States. They are located on the Royal River, approximately a mile from its mouth with inner Casco Bay at Yarmouth Harbor and around 0.35 miles (0.56 km) downstream of the Second Falls. The river appealed to settlers because its 45-foot rise in close proximity to navigable water each provided potential waterpower sites. As such, each of the four falls was used to power 57 mills between 1674 and the mid-20th century.

The local Wabanakis called the First Falls (or Lower Falls) Pumgustuk, which means head of tide. (The town's early firefighters were called Pumgustuk Fire Company. Their eponymous pumper was purchased in 1856 and retired in 1928. The first incarnation of today's Yarmouth Water District was called Pumgustuk Water Company.) In November 2024, the federal government recognized the Native American name of the falls and will label them "Pumgustuk" on federal maps and in databases of the U.S. Geological Survey.

== Mills at the First Falls ==
In addition to the 1674 sawmill of Englishman Henry Sayward and colonel Bartholomew Gedney (which became Walter Gendall's Casco Mill in 1681), the First Falls was the site of the first grist mill—Lower Grist Mills—built in 1813 and whose foundations support the overlook of today's Grist Mill Park. The mill, which was adjoined by a mill owned by Jacob Jones, was in business for 36 years, ground wheat and corn into flour using power generated by the water turbines set in the fast-flowing river below. Between 1870 and 1885, it was the site of Ansel Loring's second mill, named Yarmouth Flour Mill. His first mill, up at the Fourth Falls, burned down in 1870.

Beside the 1674 mill was a fulling mill, owned by the True family.

The first mill to be built on the western (Main Street) side of the river was Samuel Seabury and Jacob Mitchell's grist mill in 1729.

=== East Main Street Bridge ===
The East Main Street Bridge, also known as the Royal River Bridge, spans the Royal River at the First Falls, immediately before it flows into Yarmouth's harbor. Mills were built on the banks of the river before the bridge's construction. There has been a bridge crossing at this point since 1748, providing access to northeastern part of Yarmouth and to Freeport. Today's bridge, opened in 1930, carries the vehicular and pedestrian traffic of Maine State Route 88, known as East Main Street in this section. 75.1 feet (23 m) in length and 32 feet (10 m) wide, it stands around 240 feet (73 m) northwest of the bridge carrying Interstate 295 over the marina. That bridge was completed in 1961.

The first structure, erected in 1748, spanned the river above the falls. It was rebuilt in 1801 "below the dam." An iron bridge was in place, spanning the same section as today's bridge, around the turn of the 20th century.

By 1874, the bridge was flanked by a grist mill, saw mill, a store and a carpenter's shop that took care of the needs of ships built in the harbor on the other side of the bridge. In 1911, Yarmouth Manufacturing Company's electric power plant was built on the site of James Craig's 18th-century sawmill. Later businesses on this side included a fishing, hunting and camping equipment store and Industrial Wood Products. In the present-day building, at 1 Main Street, are F. M. Beck, C. A. White & Associates and Maine Environmental Laboratory.

As of 2016, an average of 4,910 vehicles cross the bridge daily. A sidewalk is located on its northern side.

As of 2022, the bridge's barriers and sidewalk are in substandard condition. The concrete covering of the barriers has been eroded away in several places to reveal the rebar within. The bridge's deck and superstructure were described by the State of Maine's Department of Transport in 2021 as being "level 4 - poor condition (advanced deterioration)."

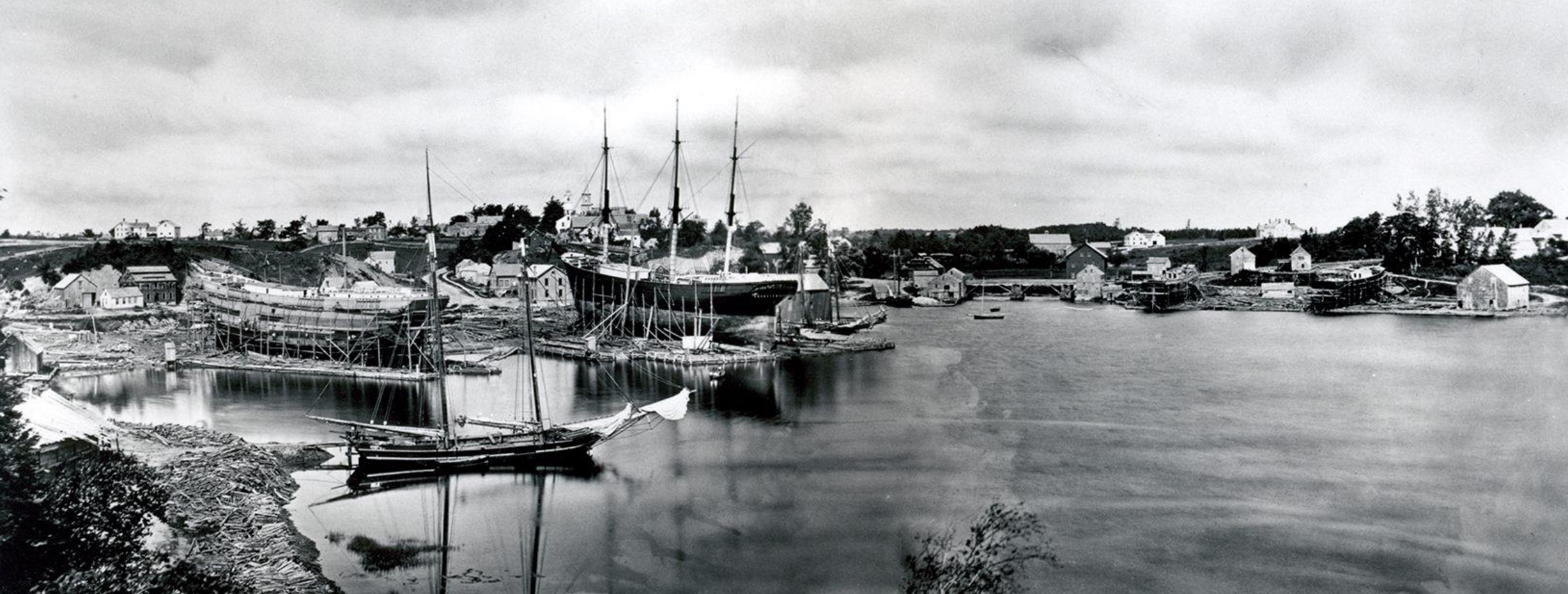
A circa-1870 view of Yarmouth's harbor, looking directly north to the East Main Street Bridge

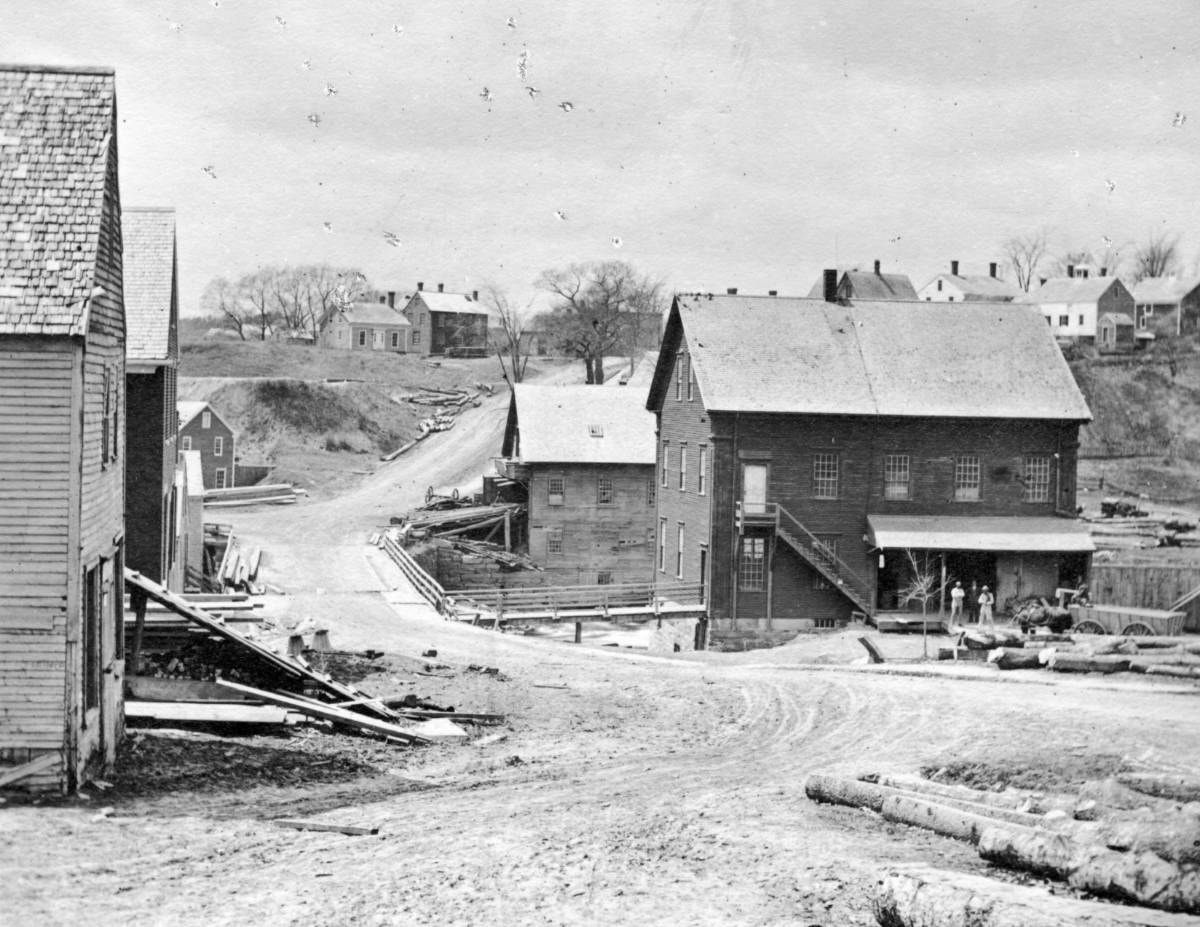
A late-19th century view from adjacent to today's Grist Mill Park westward to Staples Hill

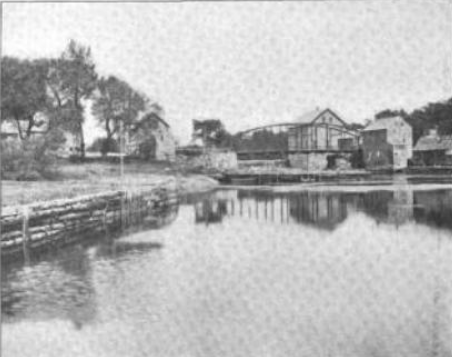
This view upstream from the harbor around 1901 shows the iron bridge and the mill that stood in today's Grist Mill Park (on the right)

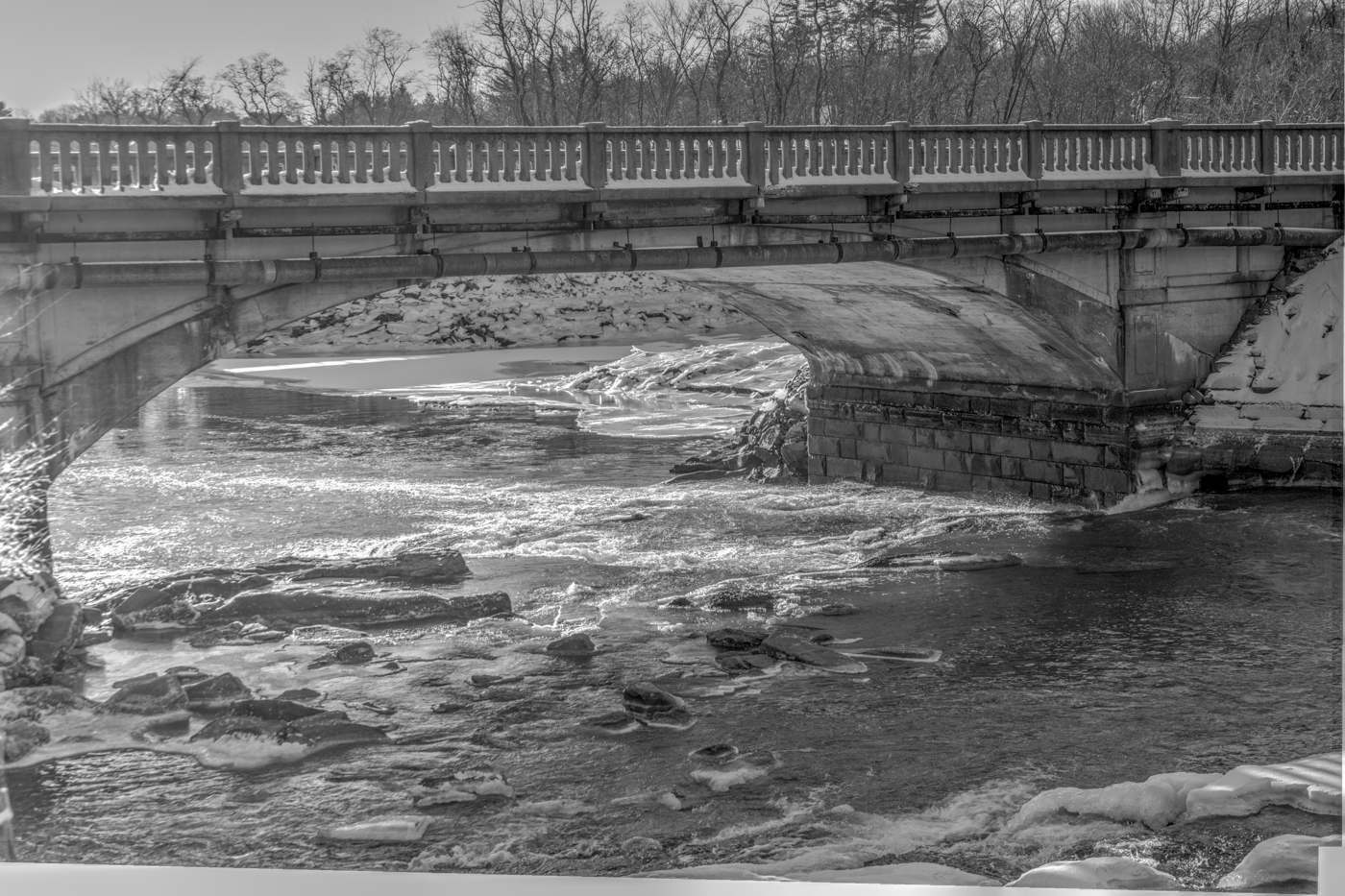
The East Main Street Bridge in 2015, looking south from Grist Mill Park
