= Sparhawk Mill =

Former cotton mill in Yarmouth, Maine, US

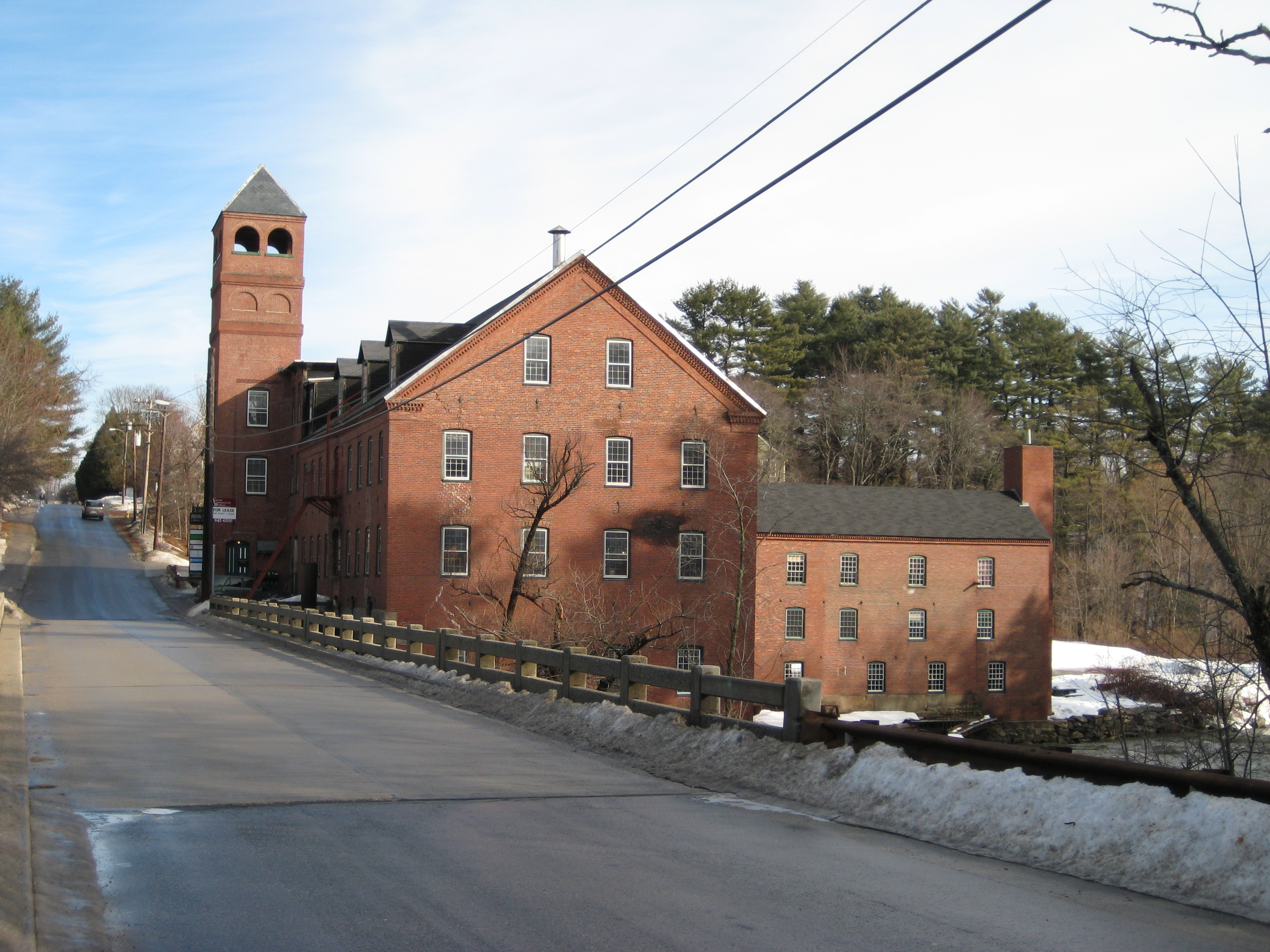
- The mill in 2008 from the Bridge Street bridge, looking north

- Location within Maine
- Location: 81 Bridge Street, Yarmouth, Maine, United States
- Owner: Sparhawk Investments, LLC
- Coordinates: 43°48′05″N 70°10′52″W

Construction
- Completed: 1840 (186 years ago)
- Renovated: 1855 (171 years ago)
- Floor count: 4
- Floor area: 21,000 sq. ft

Sparhawk Mill is a former cotton mill on Bridge Street in Yarmouth, Maine, United States. Built in 1840 and made of brick, it is home today to several businesses. The mill stands, just east of the town's Second Falls, on the site of several previous mill buildings, the earliest of which was a wooden mill dating to 1817.

An early business based at the mill was North Yarmouth Manufacturing Company, which was founded in 1847 by Eleazer Burbank. The mill produced cotton yarn and cloth.

In 1855, the top half of the mill was rebuilt after a fire, but also to accommodate the Royal River Manufacturing Company, which was incorporated in 1857. It was one of the leading industries in Yarmouth, spinning coarse and fine yarn and seamless grain bags, of which it produced up to one thousand per day. The mill was under the management of H. J. Libby & Company (brothers Harrison, James and Francis Orville Libby) until Barnabas Freeman took over in 1869. Two years later, Freeman joined forces with Lorenzo L. Shaw to start up a cotton mill. After Freeman retired in 1888, Shaw ran the mill on his own until his death in 1907, during which time the mill's tower was completed.

An iron bridge was in place in front the mill, on Bridge Street. around 1900, replacing an 1846 structure.

Boarding houses, which still exist today at 107 and 109 Bridge Street, were built on the crest of the northern Bridge Street hill, providing accommodation for weavers, seamstresses and bobbin boys.

In 1953, Yale Cordage, owned by Oliver Sherman Yale, occupied it. They remained tenants for the next 39 years, until 1992, when the decision was made to divide the mill's interior up into multiple business for extra revenue. The mill got its current name in the early 1950s, when Old Sparhawk Mills Company moved into the building from Cottage Road in South Portland. The building was previously own by Sparhawk Group, from which it got its name. Formerly headquartered in the mill, they have since moved to Portland, and have regional offices in Faneuil Hall, Boston, and in New York City.

The mill's electric turbines still function, having been revitalized in 1986.

Directly across the bridge from the mill's tower is 80 Bridge Street, which was built as the office for the above business in the early 1880s. Its architect was Francis H. Fassett. It stands on the site of the mill run by Massachusetts natives William Hawes and father-and-son duo Henry and George Cox.

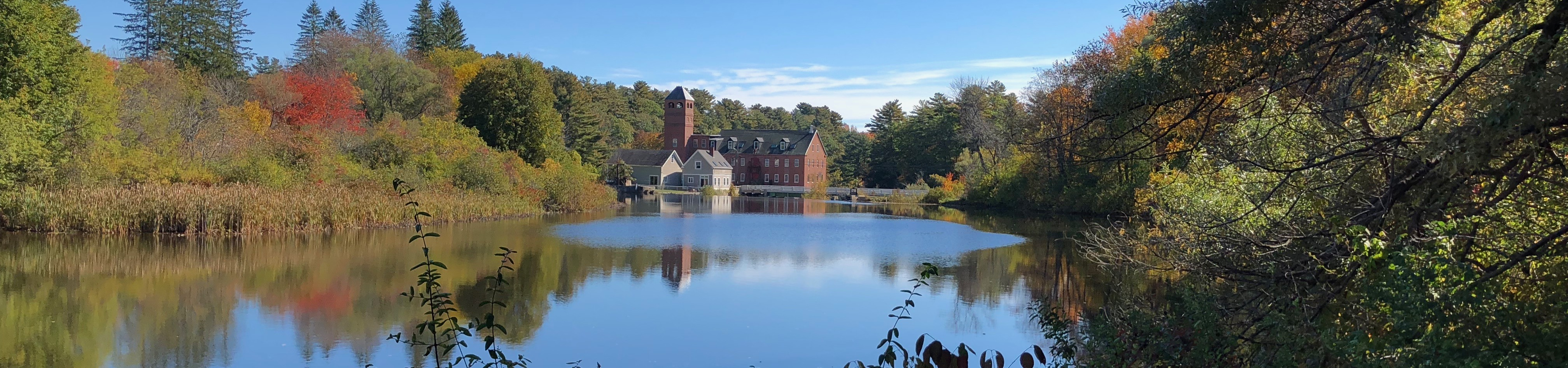
Panorama of the mill, viewed from Royal River Park

== Gallery ==
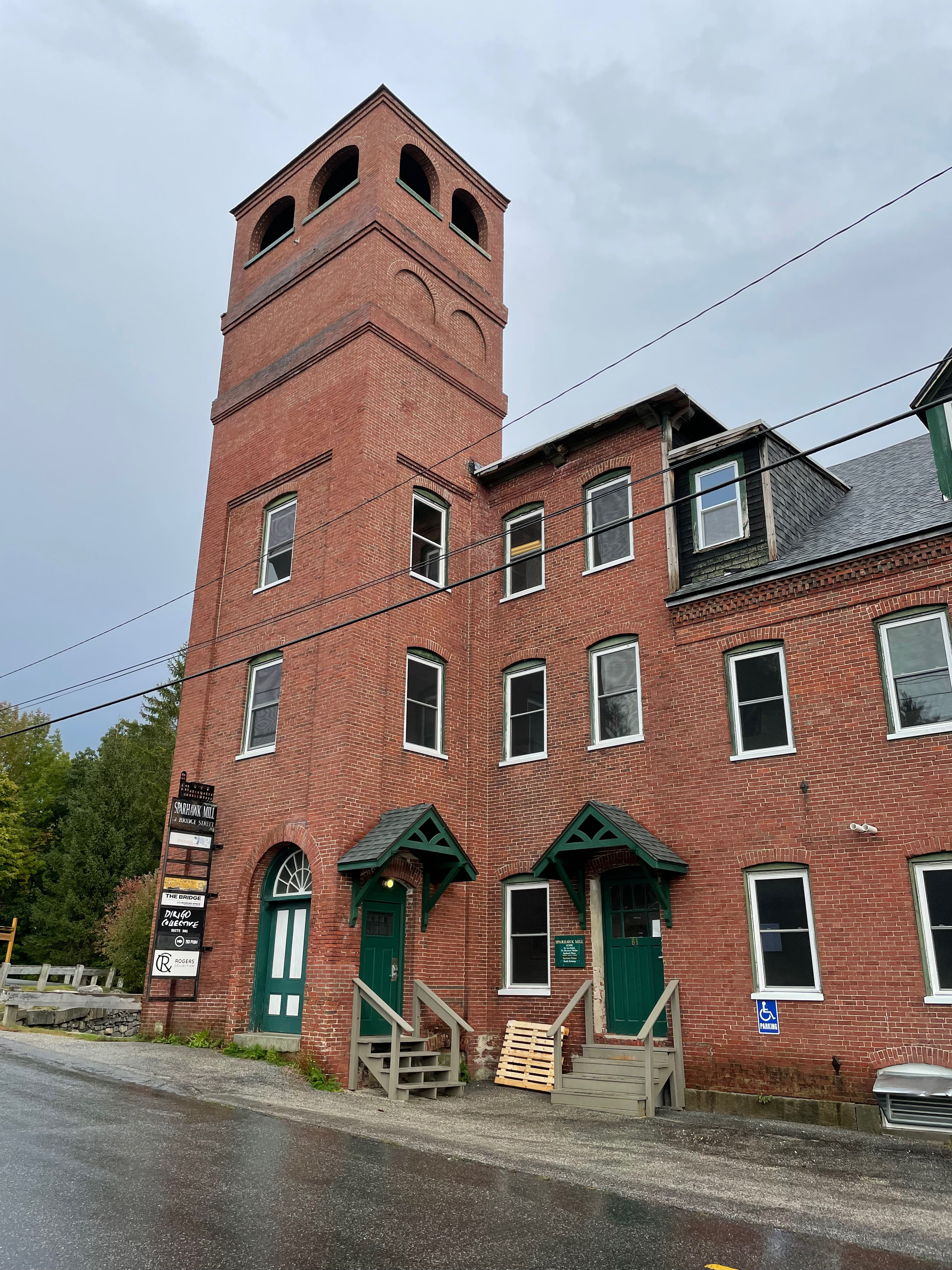
Tower

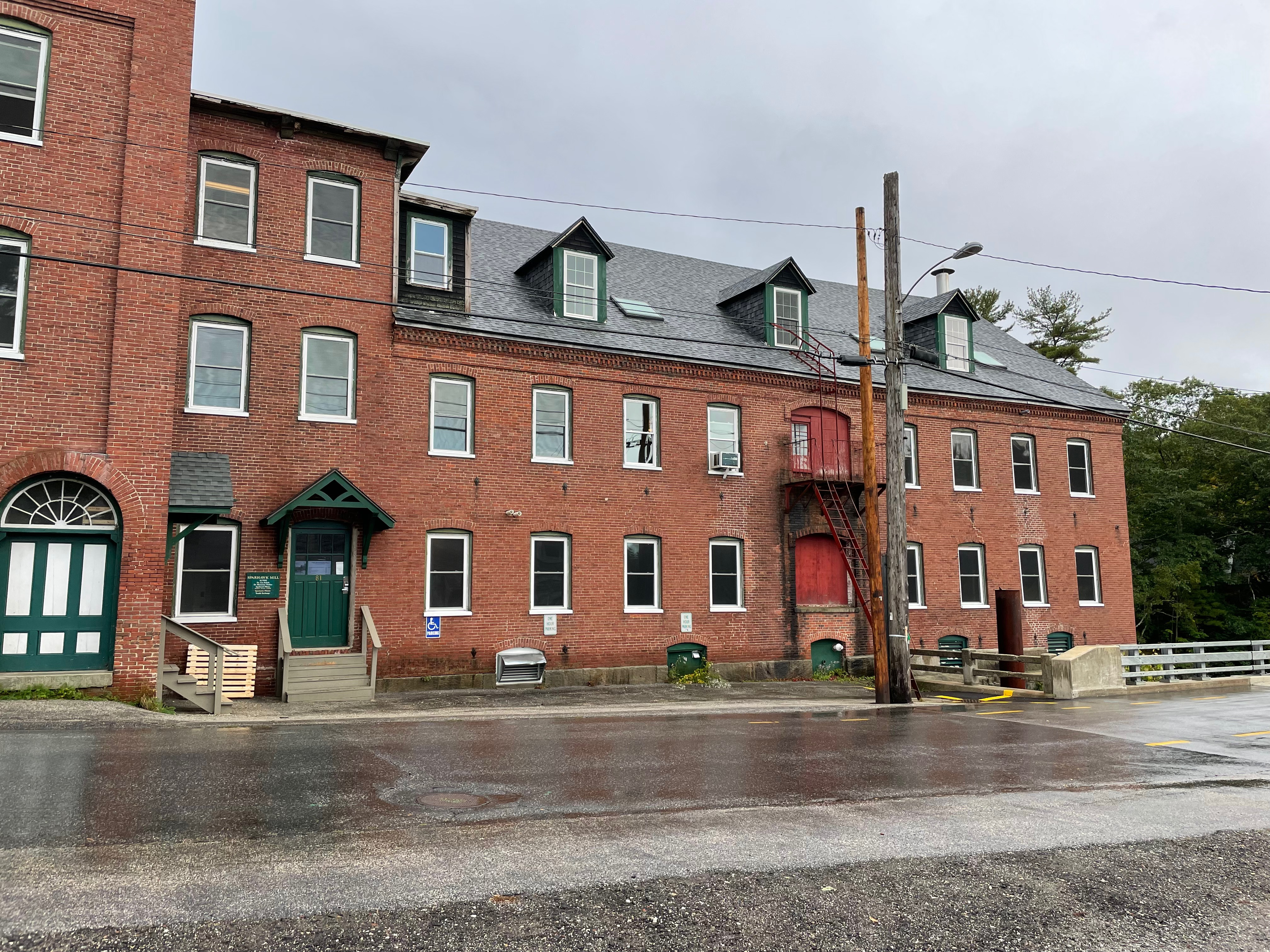
Bridge Street frontage

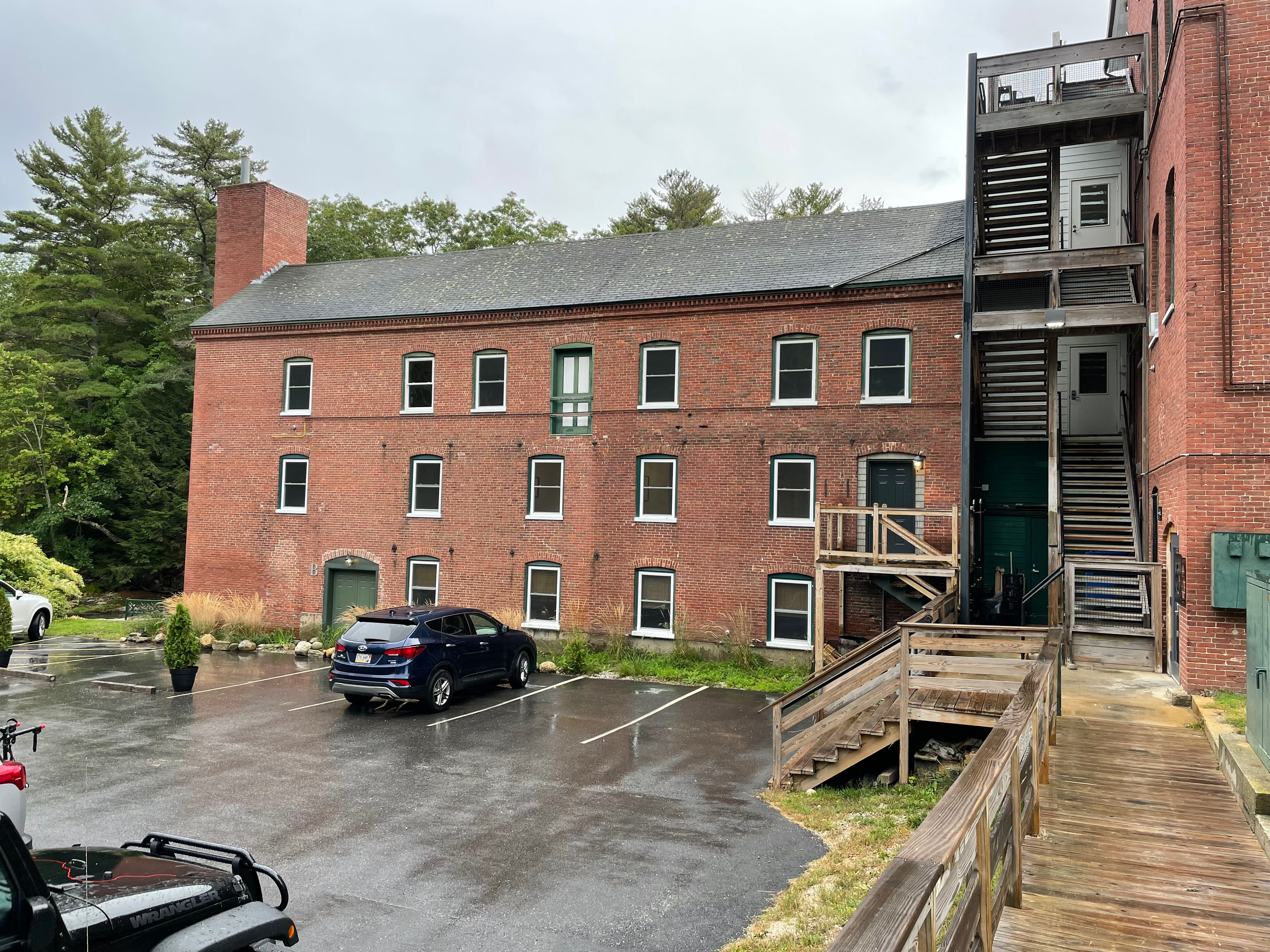
The east–west running elevation, parallel to the Royal River

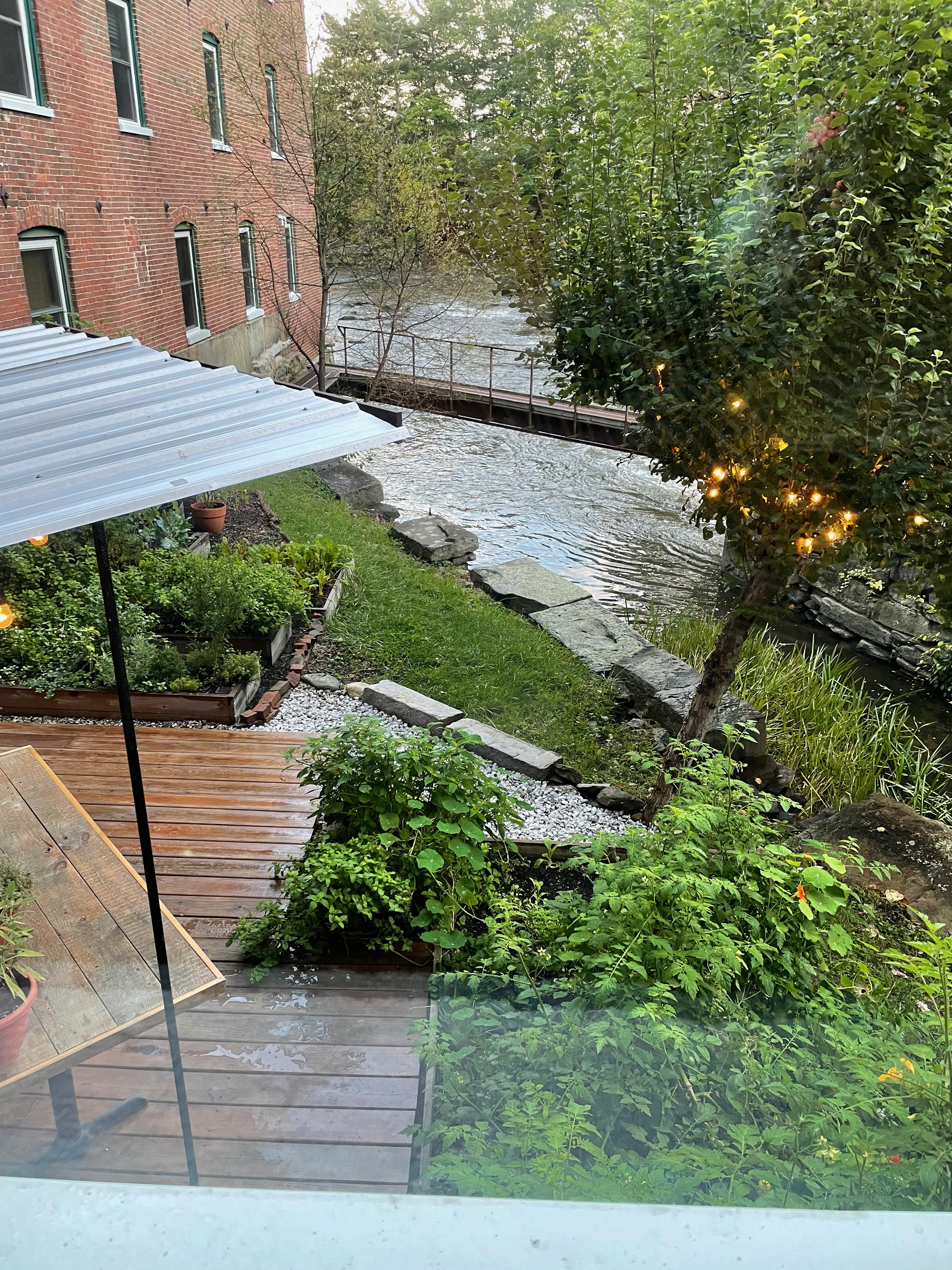
The small parcel of land in the nook of the mill's "L" shape, viewed from The Garrison restaurant

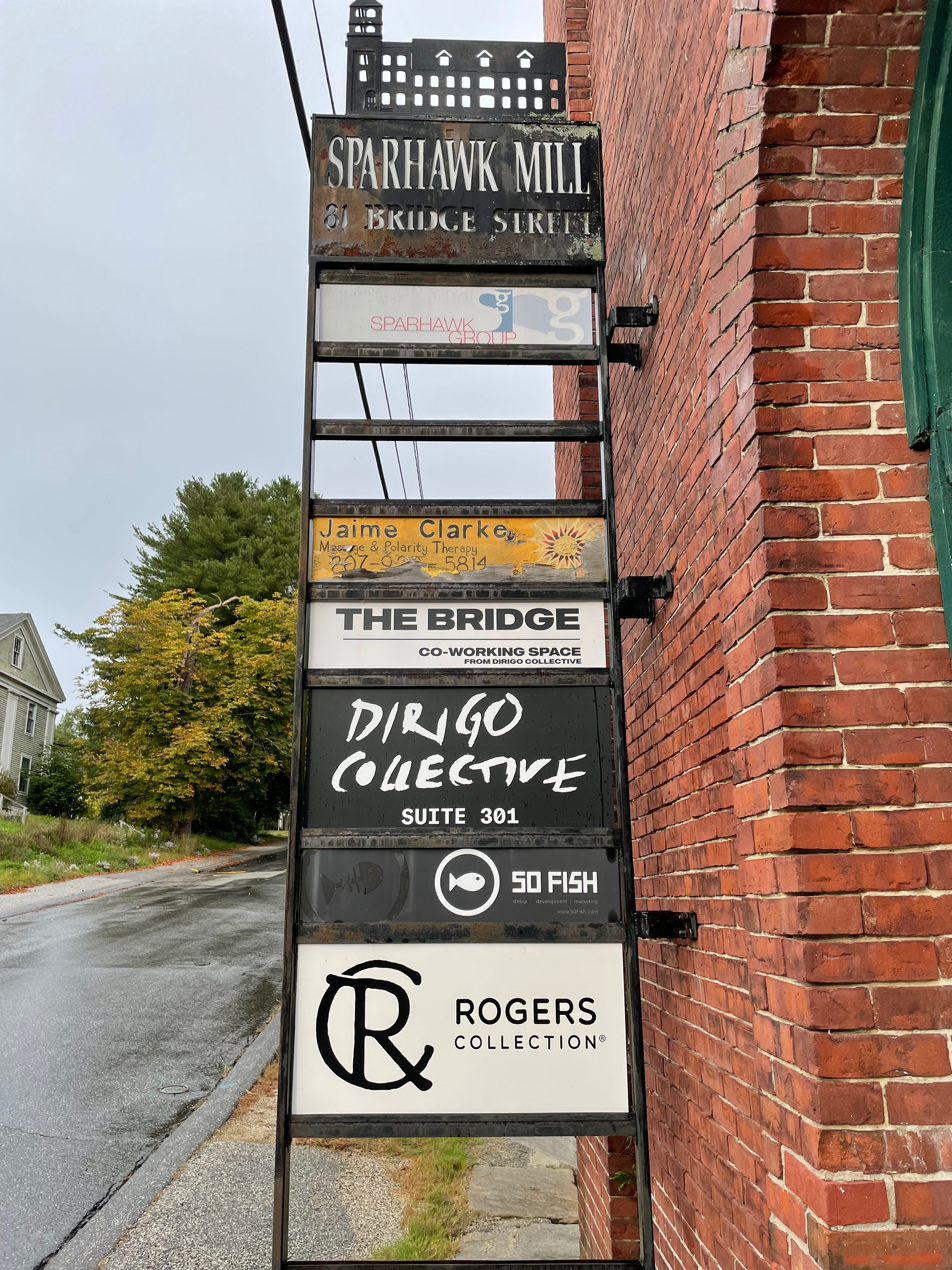
Some of the mill's occupants in September 2021

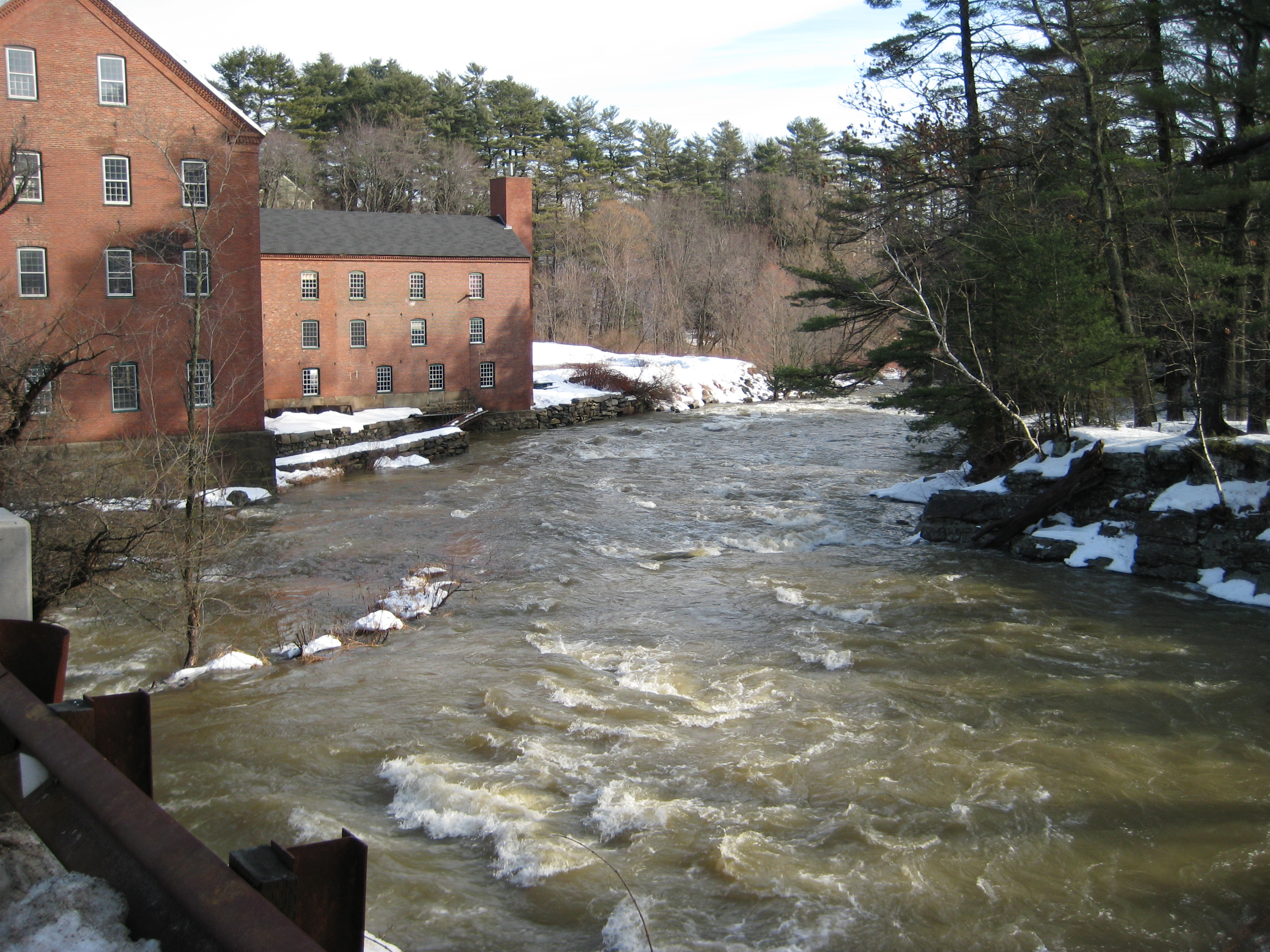
The Royal River rushing by the mill, en route to Yarmouth's First Falls

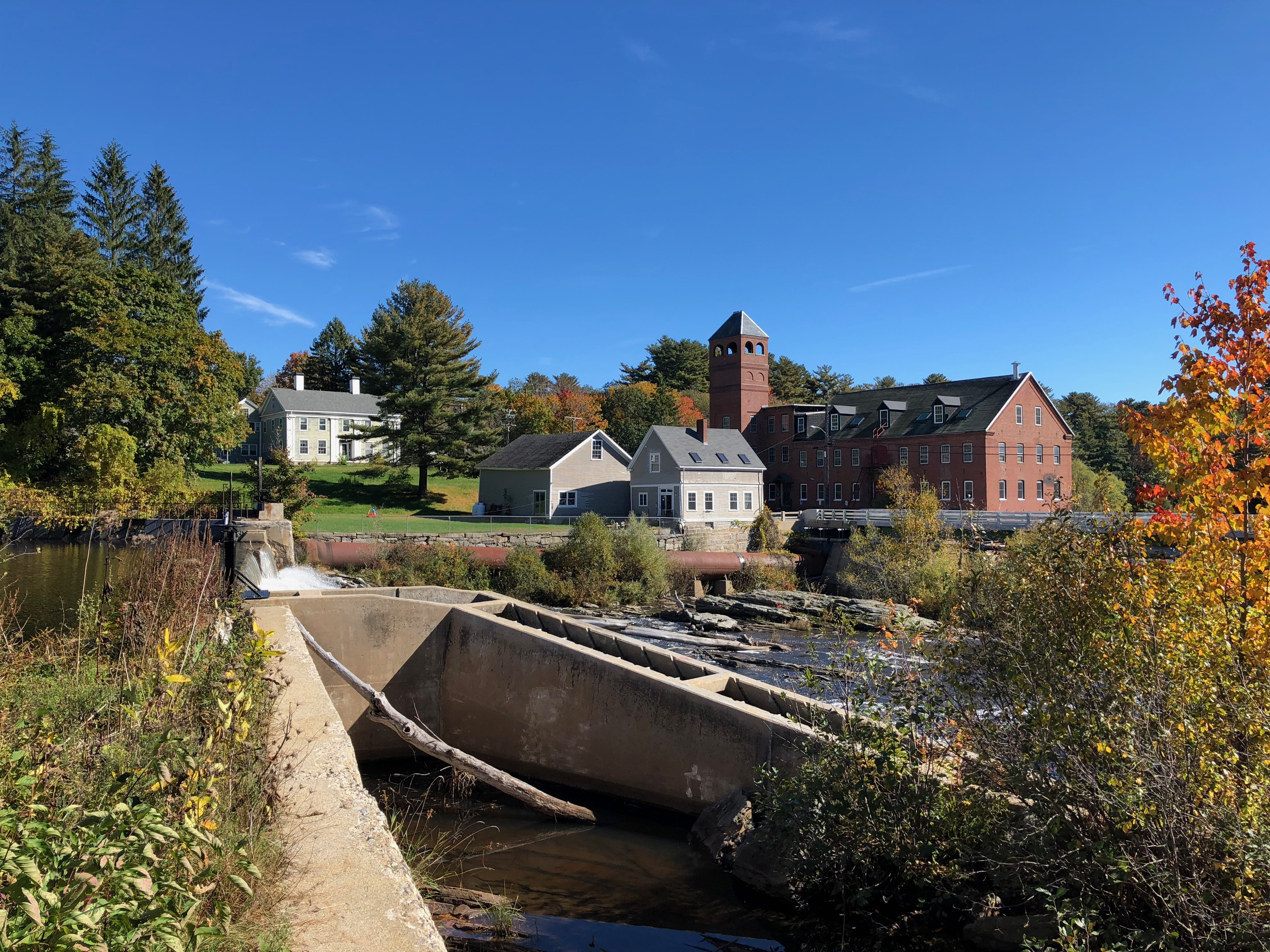
A 2018 view, looking northeast

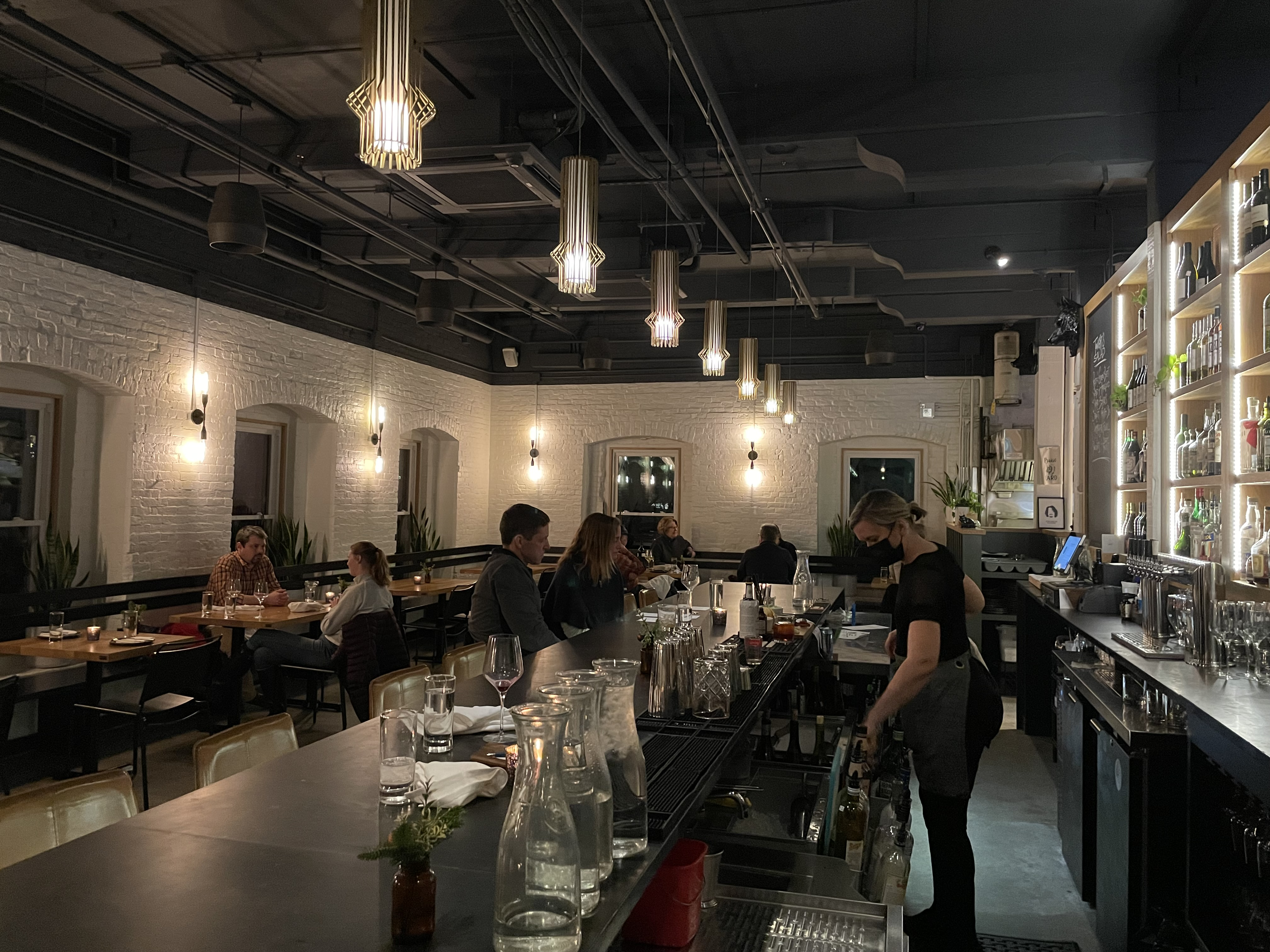
Inside The Garrison restaurant, at the rear of the mill

== See also ==
- Historical buildings and structures of Yarmouth, Maine
