= Staples Hill =

Coordinates: 43.798091°N 70.181069°W

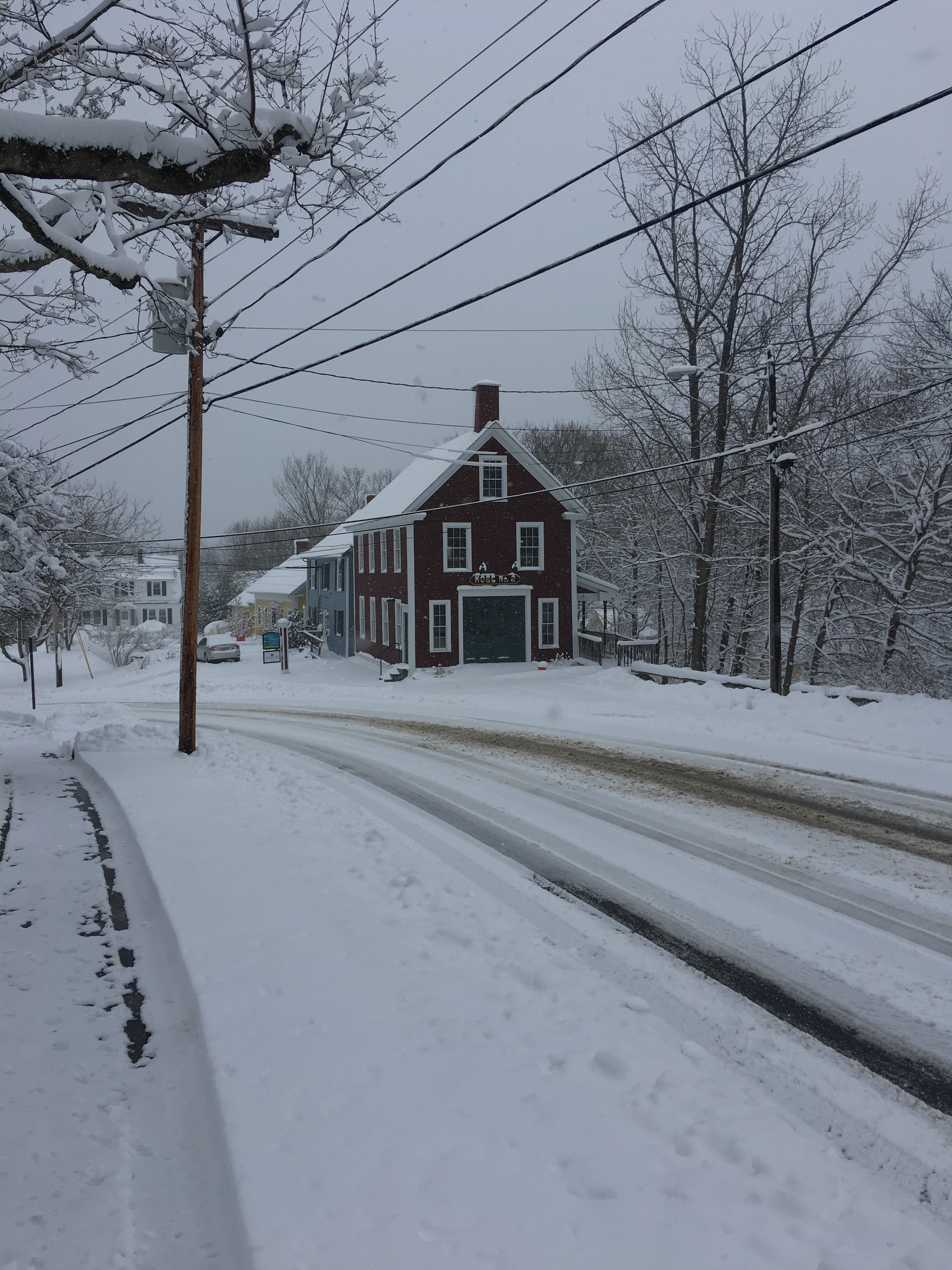
Hose No. 2, at 50 Main Street, built around 1889

Staples Hill is a historical section of Main Street (State Route 115) in Yarmouth, Maine. It is located, in what is known as Lower Falls (or Falls Village or The Falls), at Main Street's split with Marina Road. Main Street continues on, down a substantial hill, to First Falls, while Marina Road leads, in a similar fashion, toward Yarmouth Marina, where ships were built between the late 18th and late 19th centuries. Today, both roads join State Route 88 around 450 feet (140 m) apart; historically, however, they provided access to the harbor from the town. The section of Route 88 between the intersections was formerly known as Grantville.

The hill is names for Bethiah Staples, who lived at nearby 63 Main Street.

Built around 1889, the prominent former fire station Hose No. 2, at 50 Main Street, is the first building in the wedge of land formed by the split in the road. Several more are located behind it, such as 46 Main Street, as the land slopes down to the First Falls and the harbor.

== Architecture ==
The following historic properties are each located on the hills of either Main Street or Marina Road.

=== Main Street ===
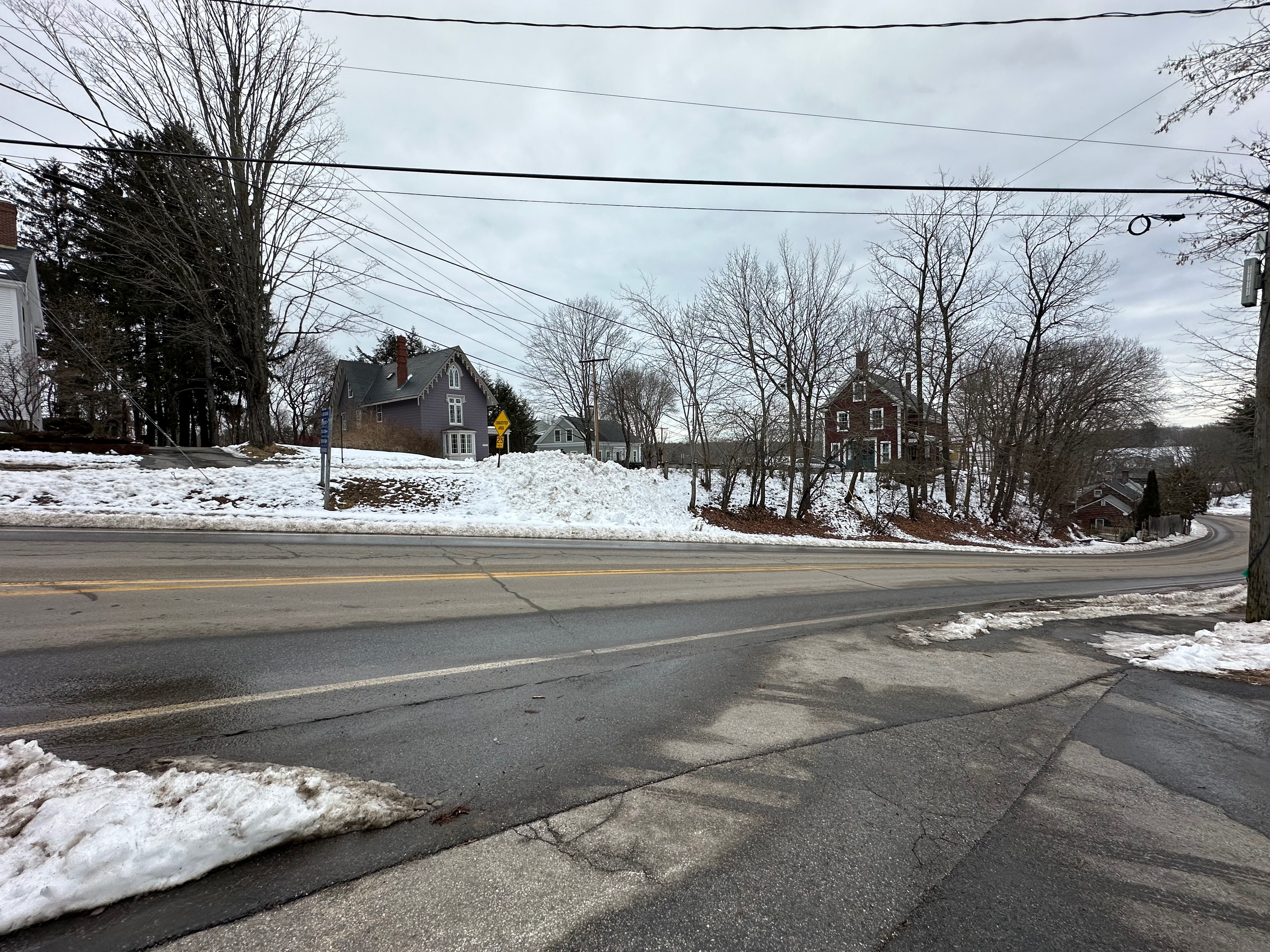
49 Main Street (left of center) and Hose No. 2, looking north from Marina Road in 2024

25 Main Street, near the intersection with Grist Mill Lane, dates to around the turn of the 20th century, while just up the hill, 31 Main Street dates to around 1846.

Nicholas Grant built the main building of the since-expanded Greek Revival house at 37 Main Street, on the hill down to the harbor, around 1844.

On the southern side of the street, number 46 dates to around 1880. Next door, number 38 dates to around 1840. As mentioned, Hose No. 2, at number 50, is from around 1889.

Henry Rowe (1812–1870) was the architect of the pink Gothic Revival house at 49 Main Street, the Alfred Seabury House, which was built in 1845.

Number 57, the Edward Russell House, was built around 1813. Next door, number 63, was built for the namesake of Staple's Hill, Bethiah Staples, around 36 years later, in 1849. It is not part of the hill, however, sitting just west of its crest.

=== Marina Road ===
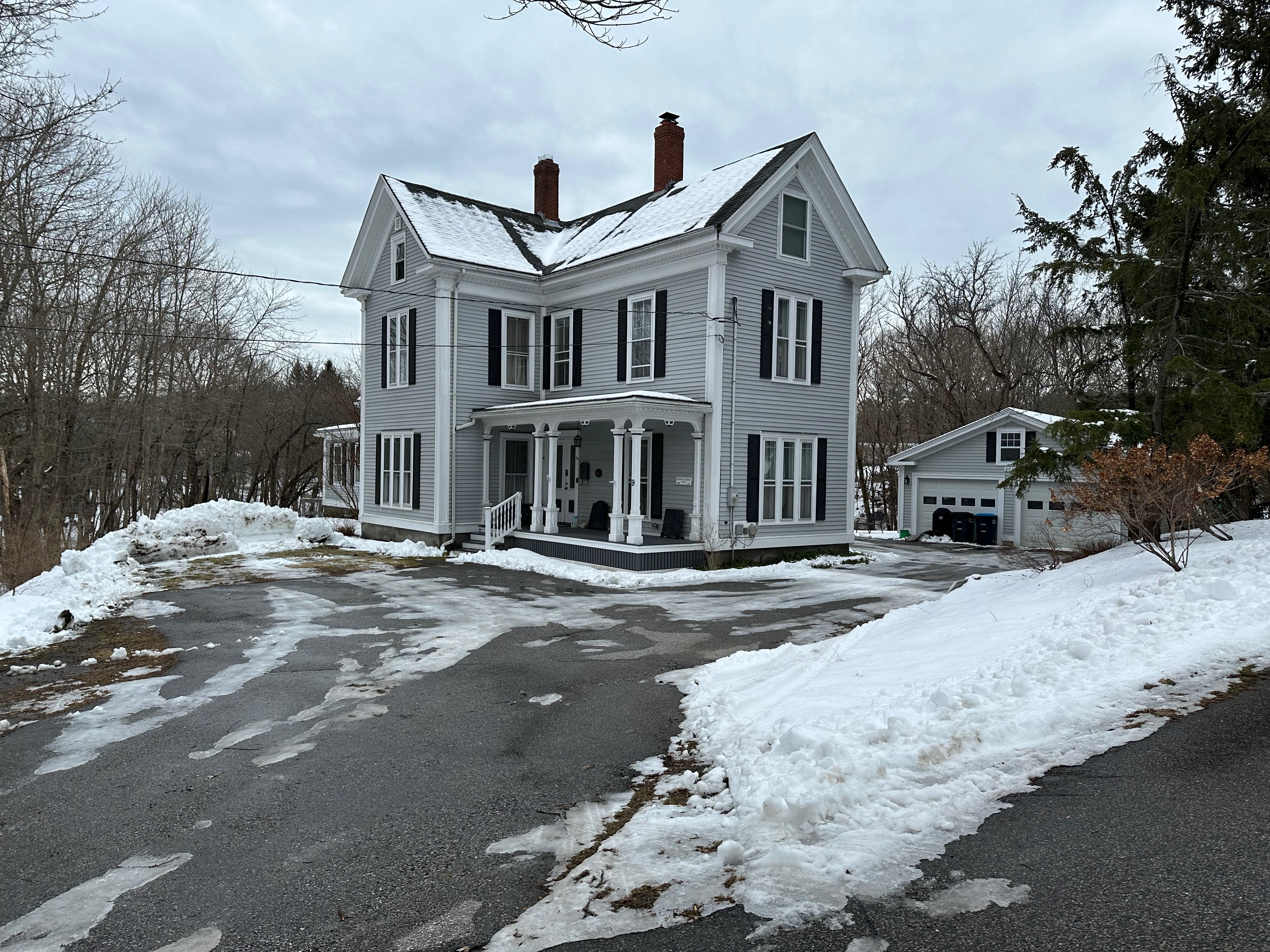
Herman Seabury House, 9 Marina Road (built in 1890)

Original owner Peter Allen tore down the Hannah Russell House at 3 Marina Road and built the current structure in 1881. Until 2018 it was home to the business Women to Women.

Herman Seabury, a shipyard foreman, was the original owner of 9 Marina Road in 1890. It remained in his family for sixty years.

Number 22 is believed to date from around 1800. Number 36 was built around 1840.

The last building on Marina Road before the Lafayette Street intersection is number 59. Built in 1900 by Harry Dean as a tearoom, it later became a shoe-repair shop, an antique store and an office. It is, as of 2023, a nutritionist business.
