= Royal River =

Royal River Westcustogo River (former) Pumgustuck River (former) Yarmouth River (former)
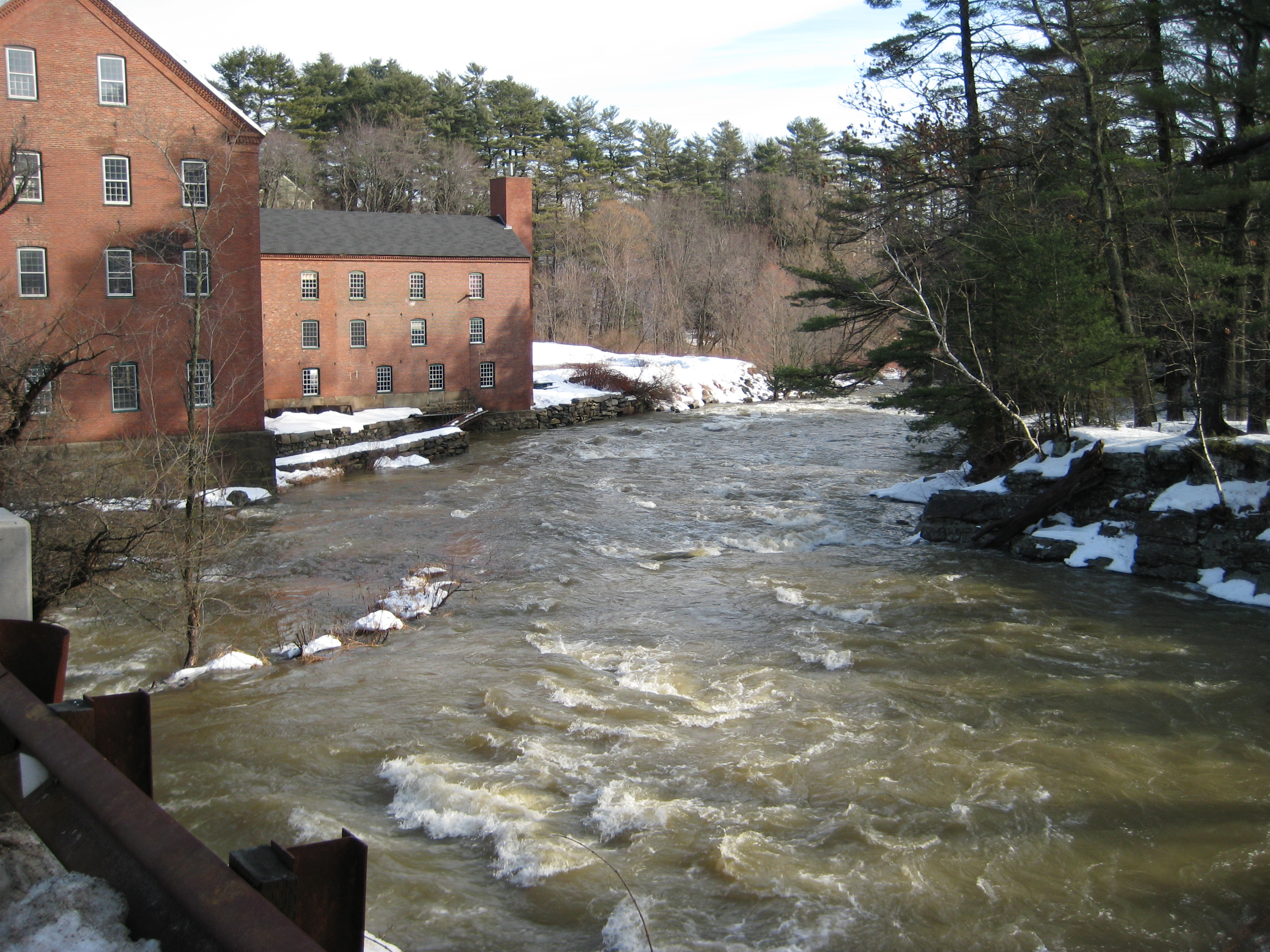
- The Sparhawk Mill on the Royal River in Yarmouth, Maine, a few hundred yards northwest of its mouth at Casco Bay

Location
- Country: United States

Physical characteristics
- Source: Sabbathday Lake
  - location: New Gloucester, Maine
  - coordinates: 43°59′18″N 70°20′58″W
- Mouth: Casco Bay
  - location: Yarmouth, Maine
  - coordinates: 43°47′51.4″N 70°10′37.9″W
- Length: 39 mi (63 km)

The Royal River is a small river, 39 miles (63 km) long, in southern Maine. The river originates in Sabbathday Lake in New Gloucester and flows northeasterly into Auburn and then southerly through New Gloucester (via the Royal River Reservoir), Gray and North Yarmouth into Casco Bay at Yarmouth.

The river is bridged by Interstate 95 and U.S. Route 202 before leaving New Gloucester, then by the Maine Central Railroad "Back Road" and the Grand Trunk Railway in Auburn, and then again by the Grand Trunk Railway and by State Route 231 when it returns to New Gloucester. The river is bridged twice more by the Maine Central Back Road in Gray. In North Yarmouth, the river is bridged again by State Route 231 and by State Route 9, and in Yarmouth it is crossed by the Maine Central Railroad "Lower Road", again by the Grand Trunk Railway, by U.S. Route 1 and, at its mouth at Yarmouth Marina, by State Route 88 (carried by the East Main Street Bridge) and, finally, Interstate 295.

The Native Americans called the river Westcustogo River (meaning muddy) or Pumgustuck River (falls at mouth of river).

During the 1700s and 1800s, Yarmouth River, as it was then known, was a source of great economic growth for Yarmouth as it provided the power for the many mills. One such mill was erected in 1872 by the Forest Paper Company on the current site of the Royal River Park.

The river is mentioned in several of Maine-native Stephen King's novels, including The Body, when the boys cross the Royal River, only to be attacked by leeches, as well as 'Salem's Lot and Rita Hayworth and Shawshank Redemption. The McKin Company Superfund site was within the Royal River watershed.

In 2005, the Royal River was named a restoration priority by the Gulf of Maine Council, part of the Marine Environment and the Maine State Planning Office. In 2009, the town brought in an engineering firm to recommend cost-effective avenues of restoring fish access and native species to the Royal River. The following year, Stantec recommended the removal of both dams, as the lowest-cost and longest-term solution. In 2025, Yarmouth's town council unanimously approved the removal of the dams at the Second and Fourth Falls.

== William Royall ==
The river is named for William Royall (c. 1595–1676), one of the first European settlers in the area, though the official form of its name omits the second L.

== Gallery ==
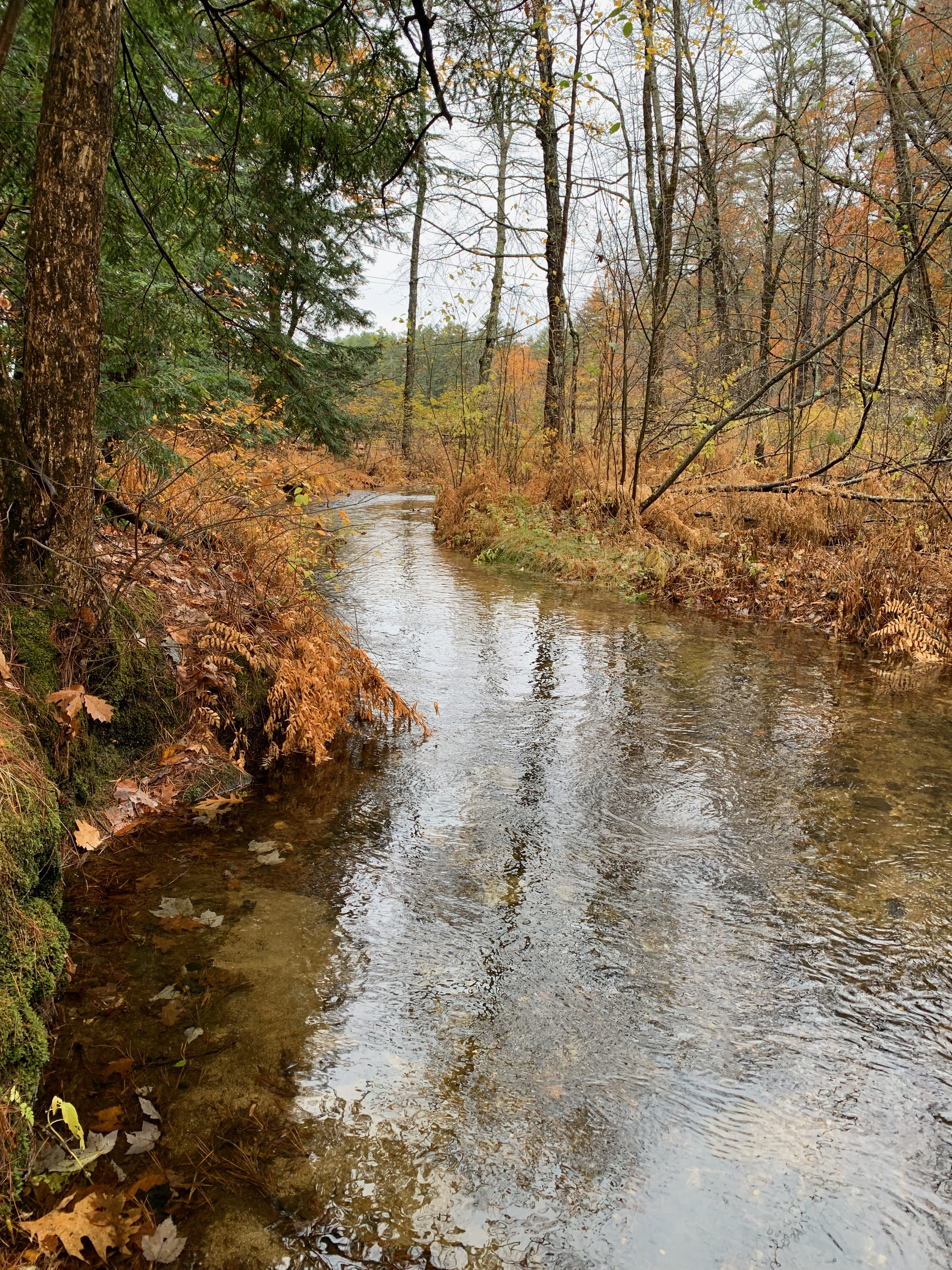
The source of the Royal River at Sabbathday Lake in New Gloucester, Maine, looking south towards the lake

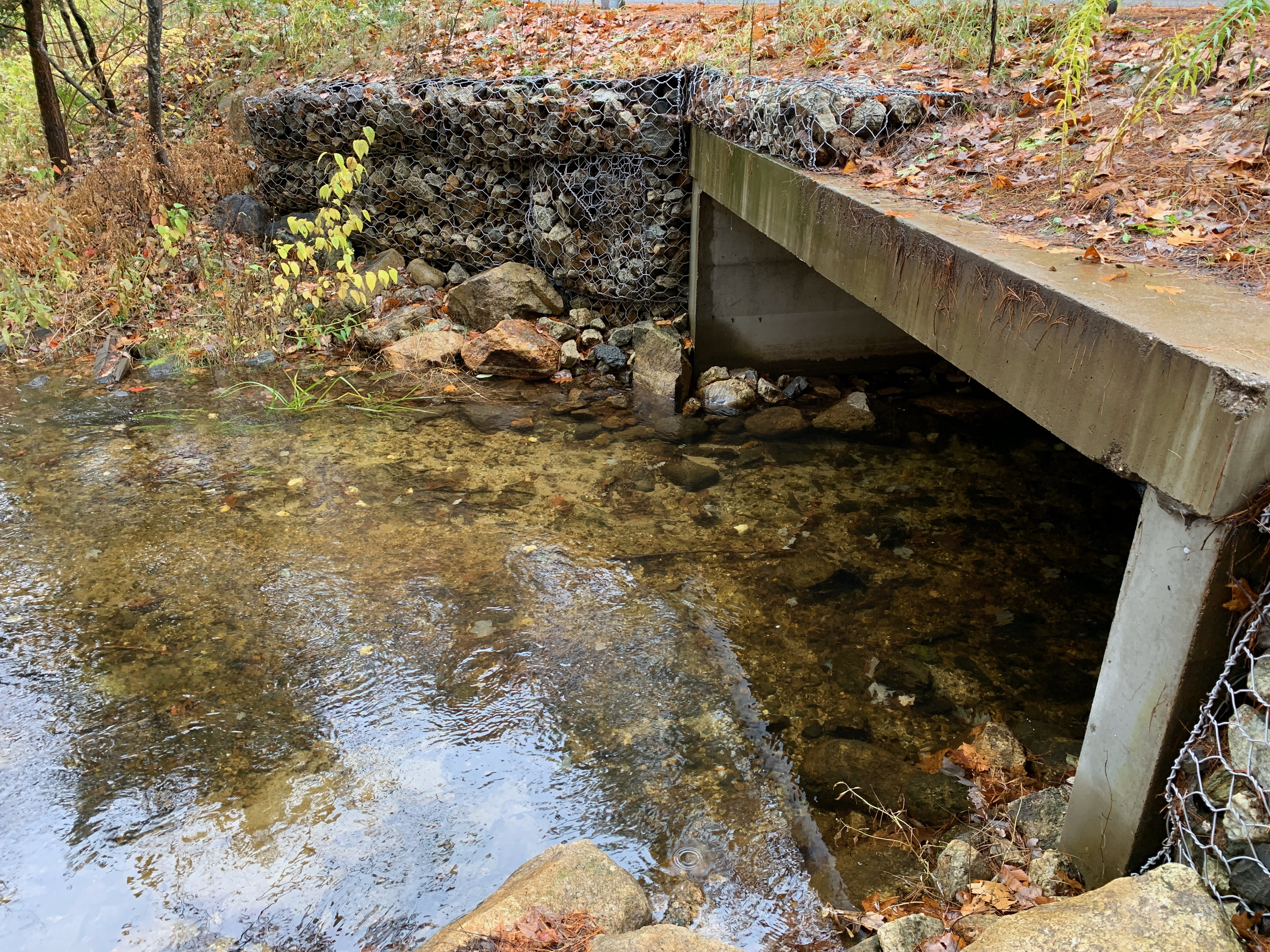
The river flowing north beneath Outlet Road, adjacent to its source at Sabbathday Lake

== See also ==
- List of rivers in Maine
- Toddy Brook, a tributary of the Royal River
- Brown's Point
