= Lorenzo L. Shaw =

American businessman

- Shaw pictured around 1900
- Born: November 8, 1828; Holderness, New Hampshire, U.S.
- Died: 1907 (aged 78–79); Yarmouth, Maine, U.S.
- Resting place: Riverside Cemetery, Yarmouth, Maine
- Occupation: Businessman

Lorenzo L. Shaw (November 8, 1828 – 1907), commonly known as L. L. Shaw, was an American businessman who was active in coastal North Yarmouth, Massachusetts (today's Yarmouth, Maine), in the 19th century. He was the co-founder of Freeman, Shaw & Co., a cotton mill, and of Pumgustuk Water Company.

== Career ==
After moving to Maine from New Hampshire, Shaw was a selectman in Lewiston, Maine. He resigned in 1865, two years after the town's incorporation.

In the late 19th century, Shaw and other "dignified citizens", like Doctor James Bates and Barnabas Freeman, often assembled for an evening's chat at Englishman James Parsons' grocery store, after picking up their mail at the post office next door. This was to the east of the former Goff's hardware store at 90 Main Street.

In 1871, Freeman joined forces with Shaw to start up a cotton mill, where today's Sparhawk Mill now stands, under the name Freeman, Shaw & Co. After Freeman retired in 1888, Shaw ran the mill on his own until his death in 1907, during which time the mill's tower was completed. On June 25, 1878, a diagram of a warping machine patent filed by Shaw appeared in the Official Gazette of the United States Patent Office.

Shaw lived in a carriage house at the eastern corner of Yarmouth's Main and Bridge Streets. It burned down in 1967, replaced by today's structure at 121 Main Street.

He was a co-founder of the Pumgustuk Water Company in 1887, along with Charles H. Weston, John H. Humphrey, Joseph York Hodsdon, E. Dudley Freeman and George W. Hammond. (Pumgustuk means head of tide or falls at mouth of river.)

Shaw died in 1907, aged 78 or 79. He is interred in Yarmouth's Riverside Cemetery.
