= Hose No. 2 =

Building in Maine, United States

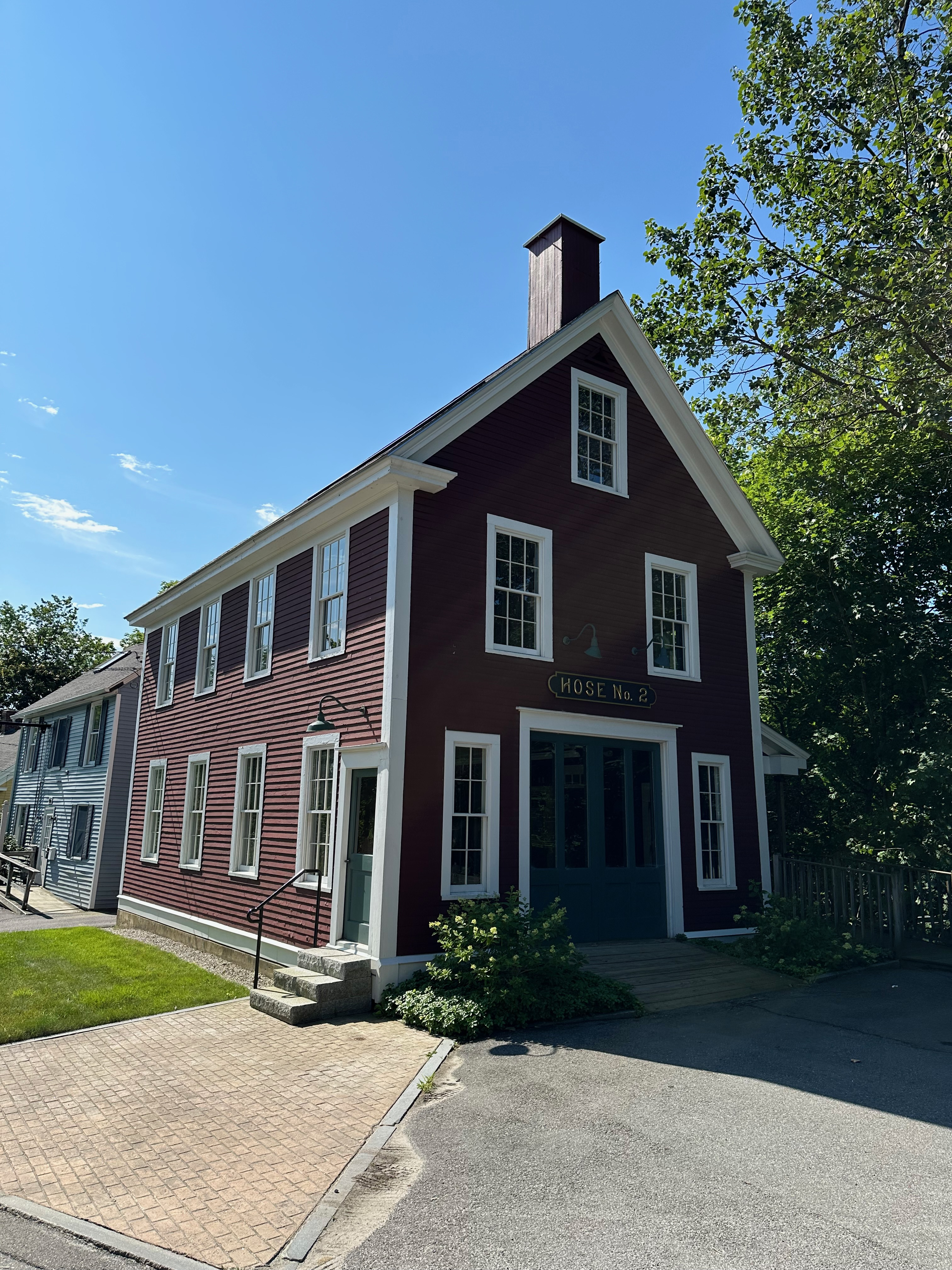
- The building in 2023
- Interactive map of the Hose No. 2 area

General information
- Location: Yarmouth, Maine, U.S., 50 Main Street
- Coordinates: 43°47′52″N 70°10′50″W
- Completed: c. 1889 (137 years ago)

Technical details
- Floor count: 3

Hose No. 2 is a former fire station in the Lower Falls area of Yarmouth, Maine, United States. Built around 1889, seven years before the town's first fire hydrants were installed, it stands in a wedge-shaped plot of land separating Main Street and Marina Road at what was formerly known as Staples Hill. By 1901, the town had "two hose companies of fifteen men each" and a hook and ladder company of ten men. A system of fire alarms, consisting of eight boxes, were in the process of being installed.

== See also ==
- Historical buildings and structures of Yarmouth, Maine
