= Toddy Brook =

Location
- Country: United States

Physical characteristics
- Source: Royal River
  - location: North Yarmouth, Maine
  - coordinates: 43.84327°N 70.21829°W

Toddy Brook is a watercourse in North Yarmouth, Maine, United States. It is a tributary of the Royal River.

The brook has given its name to Toddy Brook Lane, which ends a few yards from the brook's source, and to Toddy Brook Golf Course, on Sligo Road, which is located between Toddy Brook and a short offshoot.

Toddy Brook passes beneath Sligo Road, Sweetser Road and Memorial Highway (Maine State Route 9 (SR 9)) and ends immediately to the east of Walnut Hill Road (SR 115) in North Yarmouth, possibly passing beneath it and emptying into a small pond.
