= Bridge Street (Yarmouth, Maine) =

Prominent street in Yarmouth, Maine

Coordinates: 43.801341°N 70.181511°W

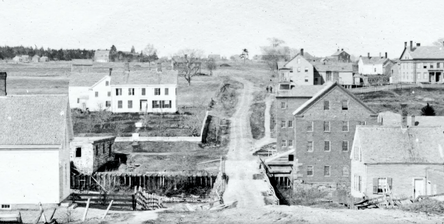
- Looking north along Bridge Street around 1890, with Sparhawk Mill on the right. The bridge was the predecessor to the iron structure that was built around ten years later
- Interactive map of Bridge Street
- Length: 0.36 mi (0.58 km)
- Location: Yarmouth, Maine, U.S.
- Northern end: Willow Street
- Southern end: Main Street (State Route 115)

Bridge Street is a historic street in Yarmouth, Maine, United States. It runs for about 0.36 miles (0.58 km) from Willow Street in the north to the town's Main Street, State Route 115, in the south. The street's elevation is around 75 feet (23 m) at each end, while its middle section, at its crossing of the Royal River, is around 13 feet (4.0 m), a drop of around 62 feet (19 m).

== Second Falls ==
Yarmouth's Second Falls, just west of the bridge, was the site of a variety of mills since the 19th century. Sparhawk Mill, meanwhile, stands on the eastern side of the bridge today, built in 1840. Boarding houses for the mills still exist today at 107 and 109 Bridge Street.

An iron truss bridge was in place around the turn of the 20th century, replacing a structure that dated to 1846.

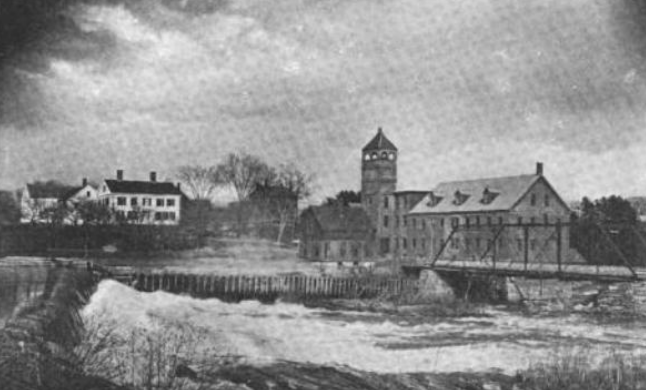
The Second Falls around 1907, when an iron bridge crossed the Royal River and the Sparhawk Mill's tower had been completed

== Architecture ==
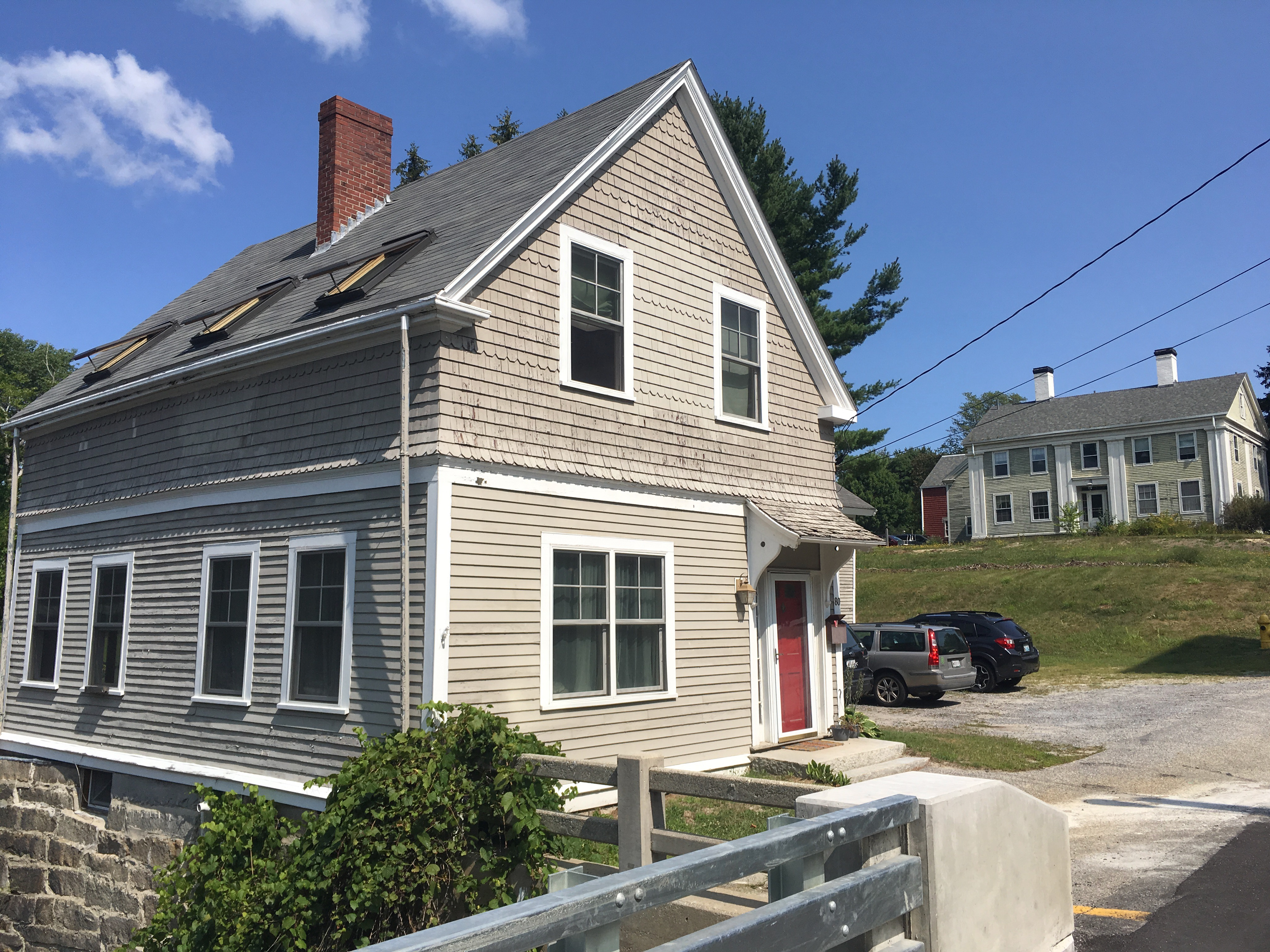
80 and, on the hill, 100 Bridge Street, the former home of George G. Loring

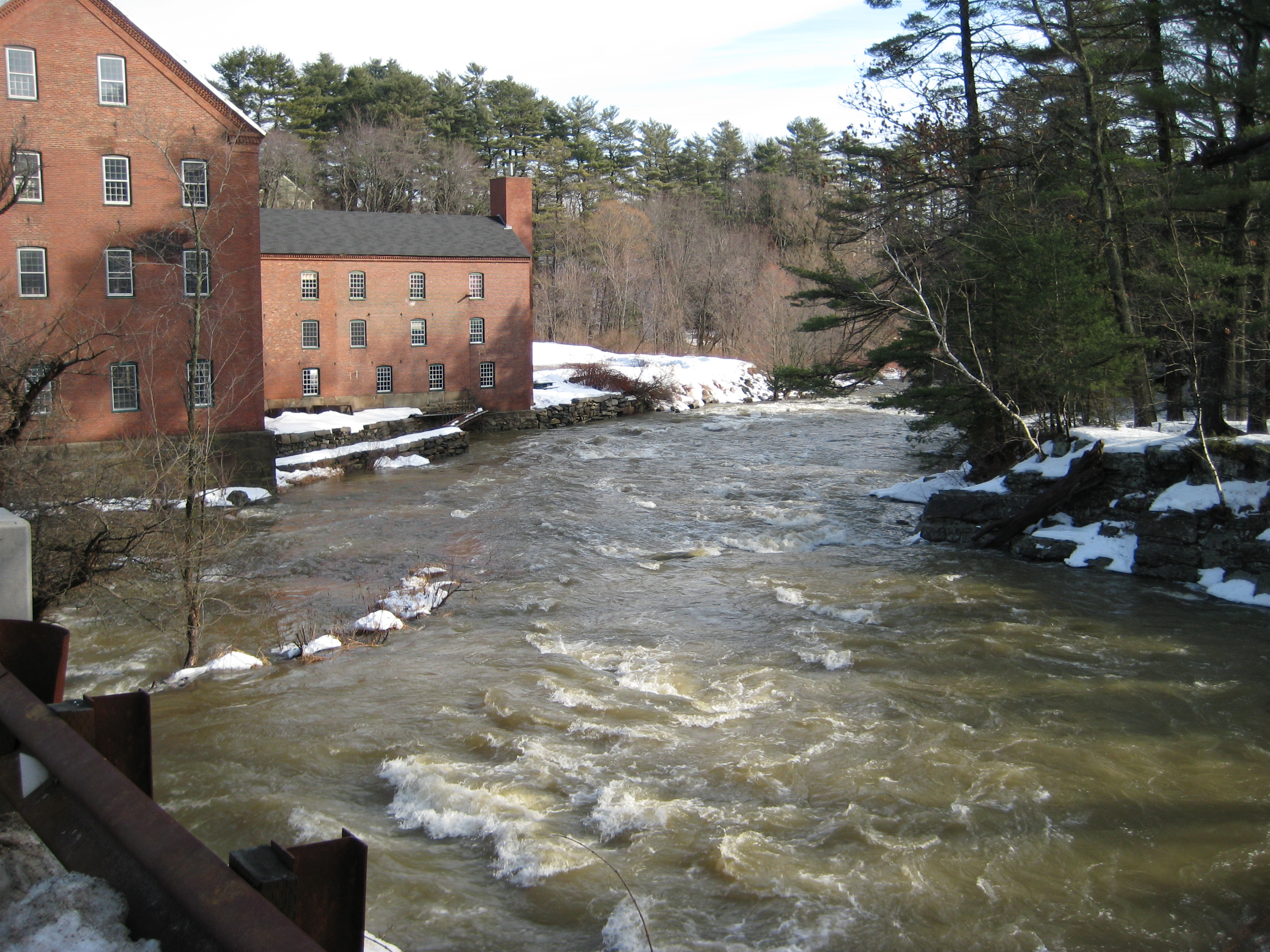
The Royal River rushing by the Sparhawk Mill on Bridge Street, en route to the First Falls

17 Bridge Street was built in 1852 and used as the parsonage for the First Parish Church between 1862 and 1997. Meanwhile, 21 Bridge Street was built in 1851 as a duplex for mill owners Mitchell and Loring.

The original wooden 1811 NYA school building was removed to the adjacent Bridge Street "just below the residence of the late Charles O. Rowe," the father of William Hutchinson Rowe, roughly where number 28 Bridge Street, built in 1860, is today.

43 Bridge Street was built in 1844 and became part of Royal River Manufacturing Company in 1871.

Sparhawk Mill is at number 81. This brick mill was built in the 1840s, replacing a wooden mill dating to 1817, but its top half was rebuilt in 1855 after a fire.

Crossing the river, directly across from the Sparhawk Mill tower is 80 Bridge Street, which was built as the office for the above business in the early 1880s. Its architect was Francis H. Fassett.

The 1840-constructed former home of George G. Loring, built by mill-owner Phillip H. Kimball, stands on the hill overlooking the falls at 100 Bridge Street.

Boarding houses, which still exist today at 107 and 109 Bridge Street, were built in 1890 on the crest of the northern Bridge Street hill, providing accommodation for weavers, seamstresses and bobbin boys of the mills.

In 1848, Philip Kimball built the house at 125 Bridge, which is today's Charron residence.

Number 132 was built in 1840.

The run-down building at 148 Bridge (at its intersection with Willow Street) has been vacant since the early 2000s. It was built in 1826.
