= Joseph York Hodsdon =

American businessman and politician

- Hodsdon pictured in the late 19th century
- Born: October 20, 1836; Portland, Maine, U.S.
- Died: February 24, 1901 (aged 64); Augusta, Maine, U.S.
- Resting place: Riverside Cemetery, Yarmouth, Maine, U.S.
- Occupations: Businessman, politician
- Years active: 1853–1906
- Spouse: Georgia Anna Hodsdon (née Small)

Joseph York Hodsdon (October 20, 1836 – February 24, 1901) was an American businessman and politician from Maine. A resident of Yarmouth, he was a Republican state senator from 1899 to 1901 and a shoe manufacturer.

== Early life ==
Hodsdon was born on October 20, 1836, in Portland, Maine, to Andrew Hodsdon and Rachel May York.

== Career ==
Between 1869 and 1880, Hodsdon operated Caldwell & Hodsdon, a shoe factory in Portland. In 1880, he relocated to Yarmouth, taking over the former Farris tannery, where he established Hodsdon Brothers & Company by the town's Fourth Falls, at the western end of today's Royal River Park.

Hodsdon was one of the six founders of Pumgustuk Water Company in 1887.

In 1888, he built a large, modern factory building in the town. Hodsdon renamed his business as the Hodsdon Shoe Company in 1896.

He was also a director of the Yarmouth Manufacturing Company.

In 1899, he was elected to the Maine Senate for Cumberland County. He was re-elected shortly before his death.

== Personal life ==
Hodsdon was married to Georgia Anna Small, with whom he had one son, Grenville Andrew, in 1864. He was named for Georgia's brother, who died five years earlier.

Hodsdon was a member of Yarmouth's First Universalist Church on the town's Main Street, and was also a freemason.

== Death ==
Hodsdon died on February 24, 1901, aged 64, while in Augusta, Maine, attending the Maine Legislature. He had been ill with appendicitis for around ten days, although his condition had been improving immediately prior to his death. His body was brought south to Yarmouth in a special train carriage arranged by Maine Central Railroad.

His funeral was held on February 27 – a service at his family home, followed by burial in Yarmouth's Riverside Cemetery.

His business closed upon his death.

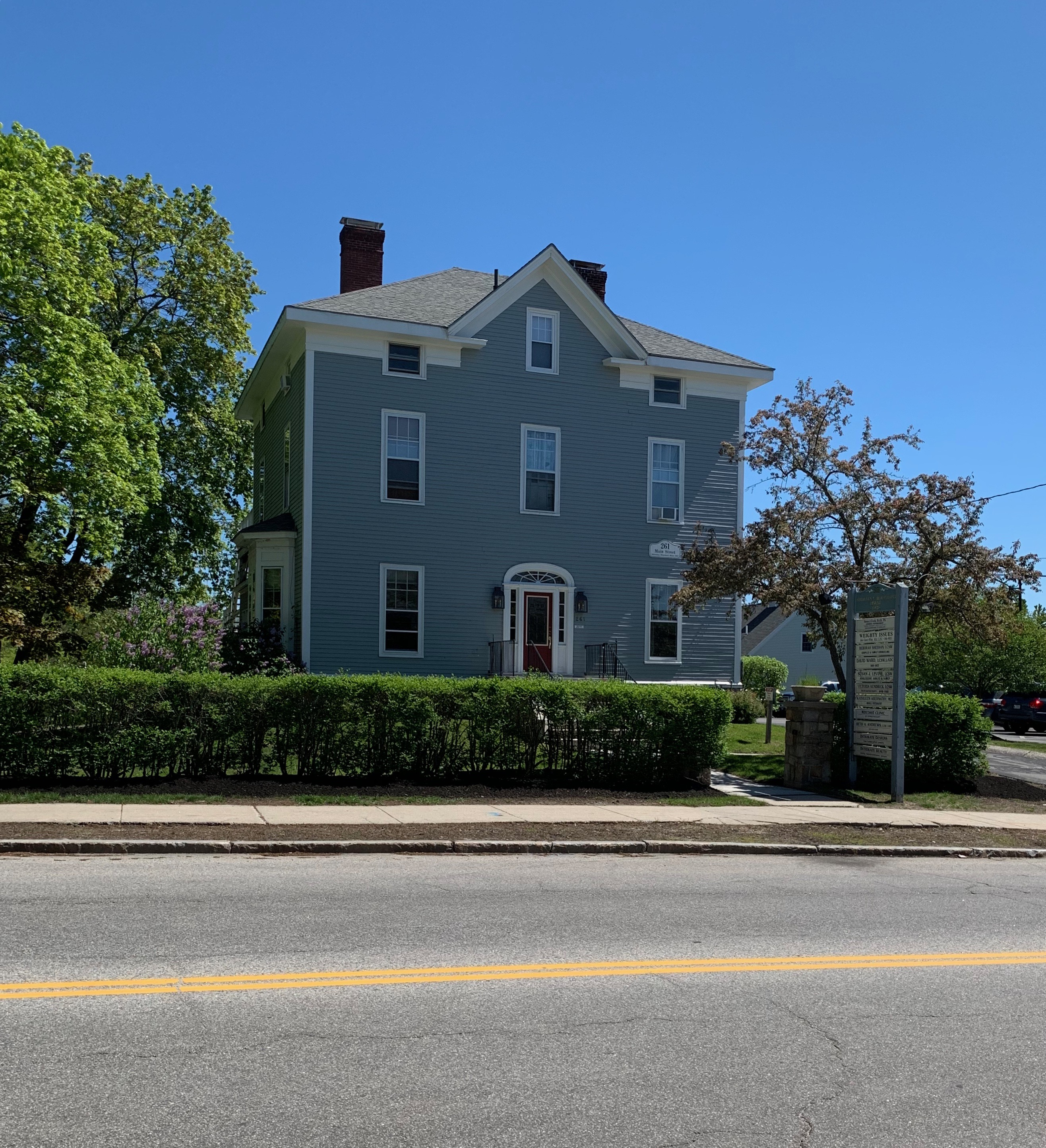
Hodsdon lived at this property, at today's 261 Main Street in Yarmouth. It was built in 1879, just before Hodsdon relocated to Yarmouth from nearby Portland

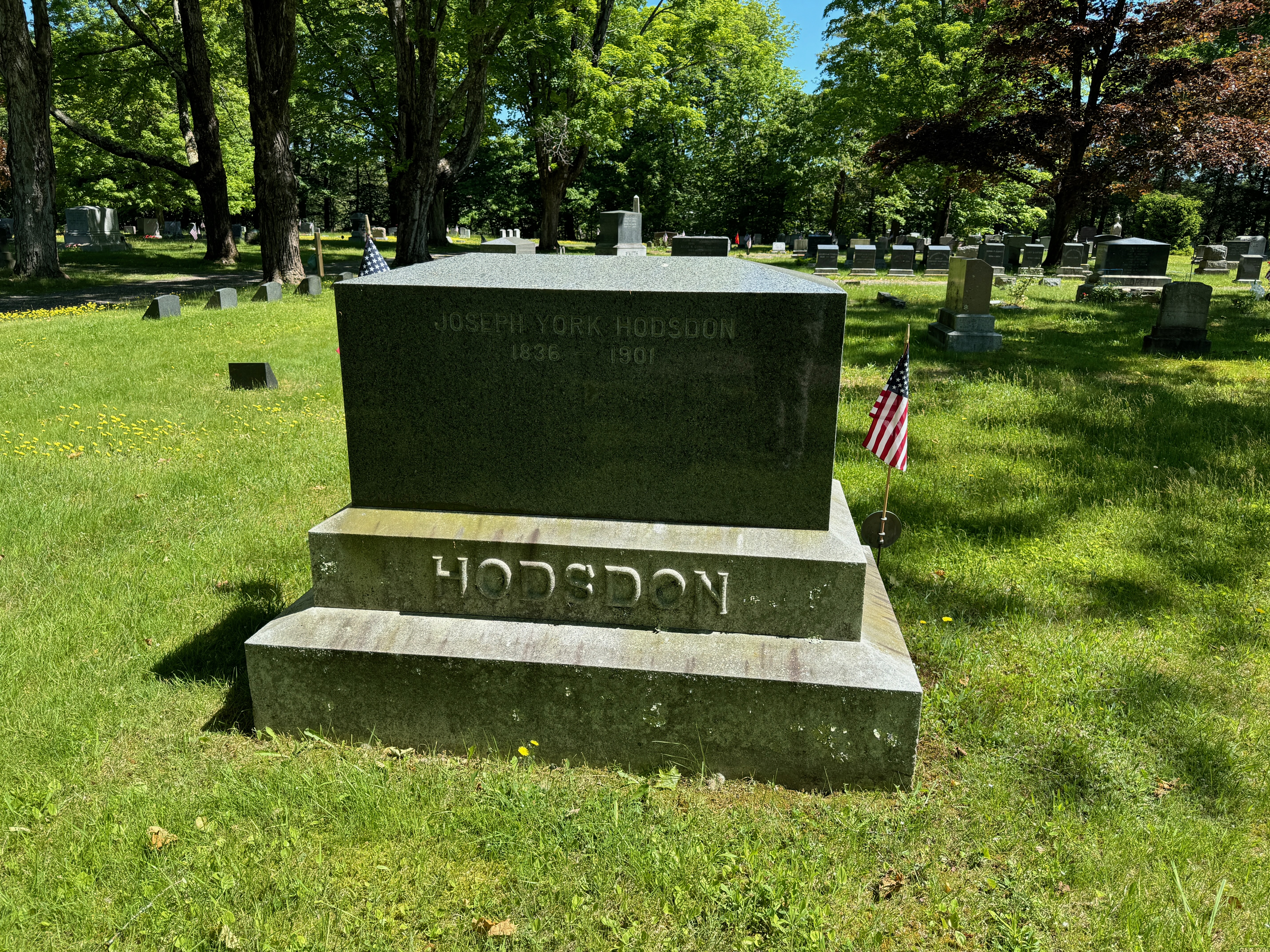
Hodsdon's headstone in Yarmouth's Riverside Cemetery
