= Yarmouth Water District =

Water company serving Yarmouth, Maine

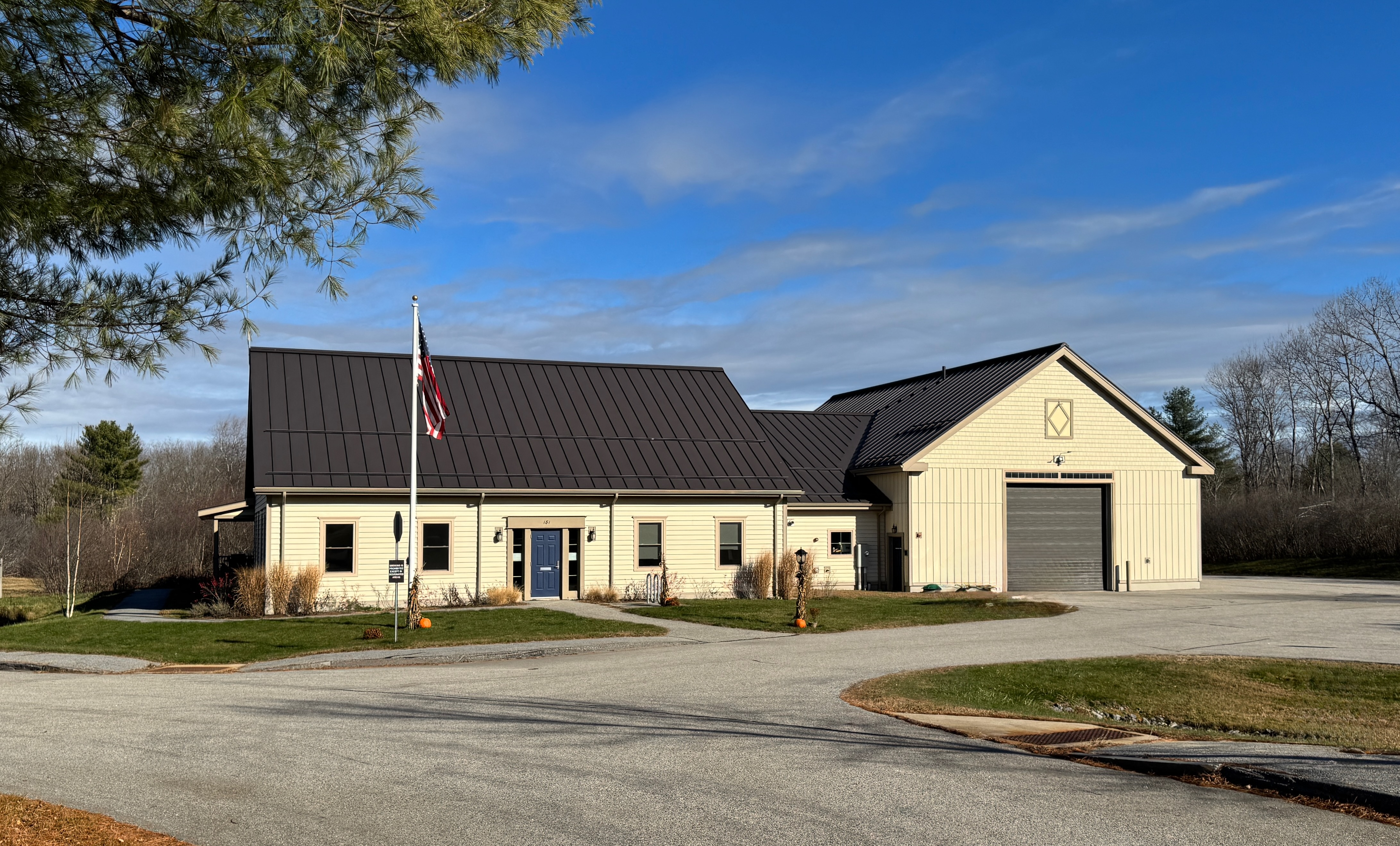
- Yarmouth Water District's headquarters building (2024)
- Formerly: Pumgustuk Water Company (1887–1895); Yarmouth Water Committee (1895–1923)
- Industry: Water industry
- Founded: 1887 (139 years ago)
- Headquarters: Yarmouth, Maine
- Area served: Yarmouth, Maine
- Key people: Eric Gagnon (general manager)
- Website: yarmouthwaterdistrict.org

Yarmouth Water District (YWD) is a water company which serves Yarmouth, Maine, United States. It was established in 1887 as Pumgustuk Water Company (pumgustuk is Native American for head of tide or falls at mouth of river). Its founders were Lorenzo L. Shaw, Charles H. Weston, John H. Humphrey, Joseph Y. Hodsdon, E. Dudley Freeman and George W. Hammond. Weston owned a machine shop and foundry at the Fourth Falls in Yarmouth, near where the water company was based. The company sourced its water supply from Hammond Spring on the property of Forest Paper Company. Hammond Spring was named for George W. Hammond, founder of Forest Paper Company and early president of Yarmouth Water Committee, the successor to Pumgustuk Water Company. Hammond built Camp Hammond in Yarmouth in 1889. It was added to the National Register of Historic Places in 1979.

After a fire in town in 1887, Pumgustuk Water Company raised funds for two municipal cisterns in 1888.

The stone wall inside Yarmouth History Center is original to the Water District building. A water tower with a tank capacity of a quarter of a million gallons was erected off West Elm Street. Its functionality was replaced in 1964 with a million-gallon standpipe.

Pumgustuk Water Company was renamed Yarmouth Water Committee in 1895.

Yarmouth's second large fire occurred in April 1900, when a corn-canning factory caught a spark from a sawmill.

Yarmouth Water Committee was incorporated as Yarmouth Water District in 1923.

As part of an agreement, Portland Water District (PWD) supplies water to Cousins Island. In return, YWD provides a backup source to PWD's customers in Cumberland Foreside.

In 2012, after 89 years on East Elm Street, YWD moved to new premises at 181 Sligo Road, beside the Brunswick Branch of the Maine Central Railroad. The new construction caused a house to be demolished, without the acquisition of the necessary permit, for which YWD paid the Town of North Yarmouth $4,000.

YWD's former building became the home of Yarmouth Historical Society.

YWD uses four water sources:

- Hammond Spring, Yarmouth
- Stevens Well, North Yarmouth
- Estabrook Well, North Yarmouth
- Hayes Spring, North Yarmouth
