= Maine State Planning Office =

Former part of Maine's executive department

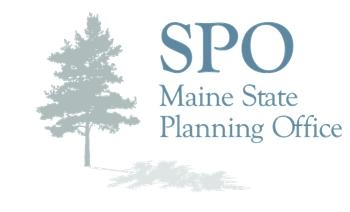
Logo

Seal

The Maine State Planning Office (SPO) was part of Maine's executive department responsible for providing independent analysis to the Governor and Legislature on the development of the state's economy and conservation of its natural resources, as well as planning assistance, policy development, program management, and technical assistance for Maine's communities, businesses, and residents.

Created in 1968, it reported to the Governor, but was routinely called upon to assist the Legislature and other state departments and agencies.

The State Planning Office had three core functions assigned to it by statute: 1) Advise the Governor on developing and implementing policy; 2) Assist the Legislature with information and analysis, and 3) Administer financial and technical assistance programs to help build sustainable communities.

The Maine State Planning Office was eliminated effective July 1, 2012.
