= H. J. Libby & Company =

- Company type: Selling agent
- Founded: 1844
- Founder: Harrison Jewell Libby; John Williams
- Defunct: 1906 (120 years ago)
- Fate: Dissolved
- Headquarters: Yarmouth, Maine; New York City, New York, United States
- Key people: Harrison Jewell Libby; John Williams; Francis Orville Libby; James Brackett Libby; Augustus Frost Libby

H. J. Libby & Company was a textile firm based in Portland, Maine, and New York City, United States. In 1854, it was listed as a selling agent for dress goods. It became one of the oldest woolen commission businesses in the United States.

== History ==
Harrison Jewell Libby (1811–1891) was the eldest child of Rev. Elisa Libby and Jane Jewell. After moving from Limerick, Maine, to Portland, the state's largest city, he began working in the dry-goods business. In partnership with John Williams, of Boston, in 1844 he formed textile firm H. J. Libby & Company. Libby was also either president or a director of several corporations, including the First National Bank.

In 1846, Libby dissolved the two-year partnership with Williams but continued, under the same name, with his brothers Francis Orville and James Bracket. Based on Free Street in Portland, they continued for many years, and eventually became one of the oldest woolen commission businesses in the United States. The firm managed the Sparhawk Mill in Yarmouth, Maine, until Barnabas Freeman took over in 1869.

Their Portland office was destroyed in the city's fire of 1866. Six years earlier, they had set up an office in New York City, where they became selling agents for several woolen mills in New York state and beyond. The firm became the oldest of its kind in New York City.

James' son, Augustus Frost Libby, joined the firm in 1869. He became a senior partner upon the death of Harrison, his uncle, in 1891.

The firm dissolved in December 1906.
