= Fourth Falls =

Waterfall in Yarmouth, Maine

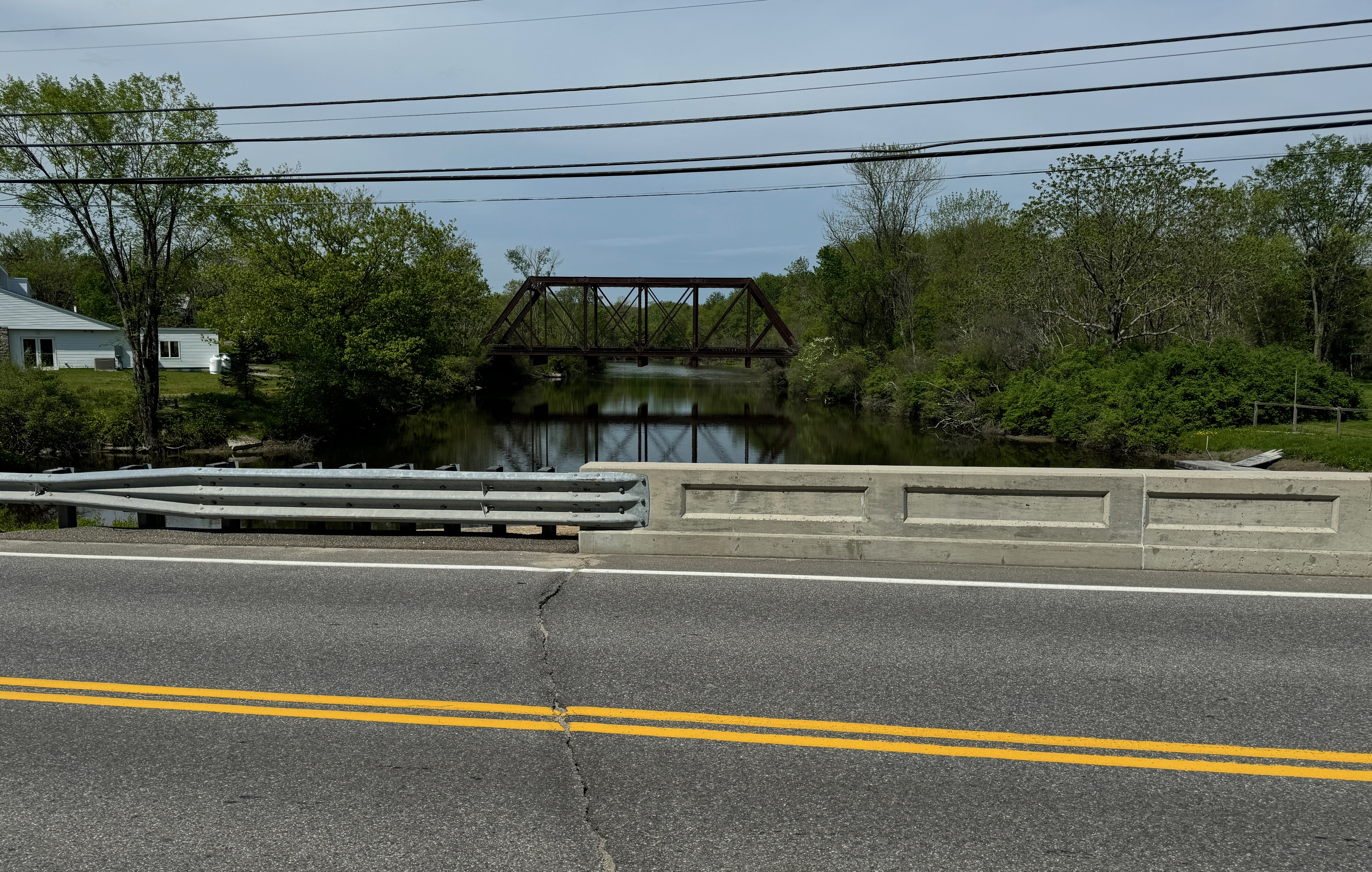
- The railway truss bridge immediately above the falls
- Interactive map of Fourth Falls
- Location: Yarmouth, Maine, U.S.
- Coordinates: 43.8076469704°N 70.189060373°W
- Number of drops: 1
- Watercourse: Royal River

The Fourth Falls, also known as Upper Falls or Gooch's Falls, are the fourth of four waterfalls in Yarmouth, Maine, United States. They are located on the Royal River, approximately 0.4 miles (0.64 km) upstream of the Third Falls. The river appealed to settlers because its 45-foot rise in close proximity to navigable water each provided potential waterpower sites. As such, the four falls were used to power 57 mills between 1674 and the mid-20th century.

Gooch Island stands to the east of the falls.

In 2025, the town's council voted unanimously to remove the dams at the Second and Fourth Falls to improve ecology.

== Industries ==
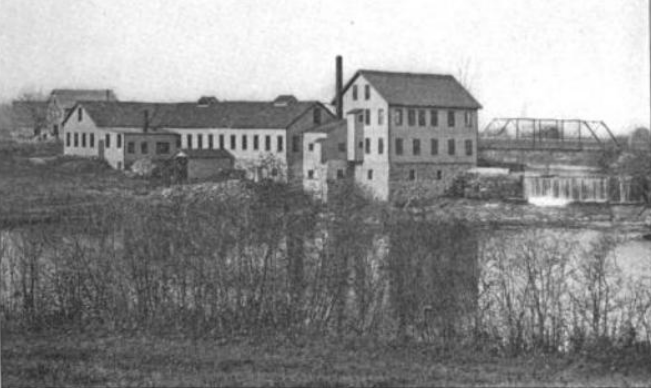
Looking upstream to Charles Weston's machine shop and foundry, which stood at the northern end of today's Royal River Park

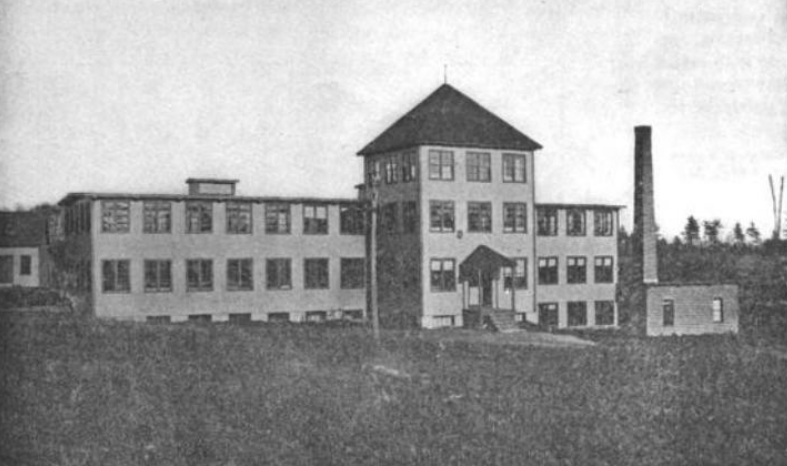
The factory of the Hodsdon Shoe Company, pictured around the turn of the 20th century

An iron refinery, the Forest Forge, occupied a spot nearby as early as 1753. After its demise, a large double sawmill was built on the dam by a company composed of Gooches, Pratts, Sargents, Cutters and Bakers, which was a prosperous establishment for many years.

At the northern end of the Royal River Park once stood Charles H. Weston's machine shop and foundry, which, from 1876 to 1892, manufactured equipment for cotton and woolen mills, turbine water wheels, steam engines and a wide variety of machinery for customers all over the world. In 1887, Weston was one of the incorporators of Pumgustuk Water Company. This became Yarmouth Water Company in 1895, and Yarmouth Water District in 1923. The stone wall inside the History Center is original to the Water District building. A water tower with a tank capacity of a quarter of a million gallons was erected off West Elm Street. Its functionality was replaced in 1964 with a million-gallon standpipe.

Later, a large building housed, in turn, a tannery, three shoe-manufacturing companies and a poultry-processing plant. These business took advantage of the Fourth Falls' water supply directly behind the building to provide power.

The Yarmouth History Center, run by Yarmouth Historical Society, is located beside the railway truss bridge above the falls, having moved from the third floor of the Merrill Memorial Library in 2013.

Also in 1892, a small steamer named the Hoyt ferried guests from the calm water above the falls to a mineral springs hotel in North Yarmouth that was owned by Giles Loring.

== See also ==
- List of waterfalls
