= Camp Hammond =

Camp Hammond may refer to:

- Camp Hammond (Yarmouth, Maine), listed on the National Register of Historic Places
- Camp Hammond (comics)
- Camp Hammond (Kansas)
