= Old Baptist Cemetery =

Cemetery in Yarmouth, Maine

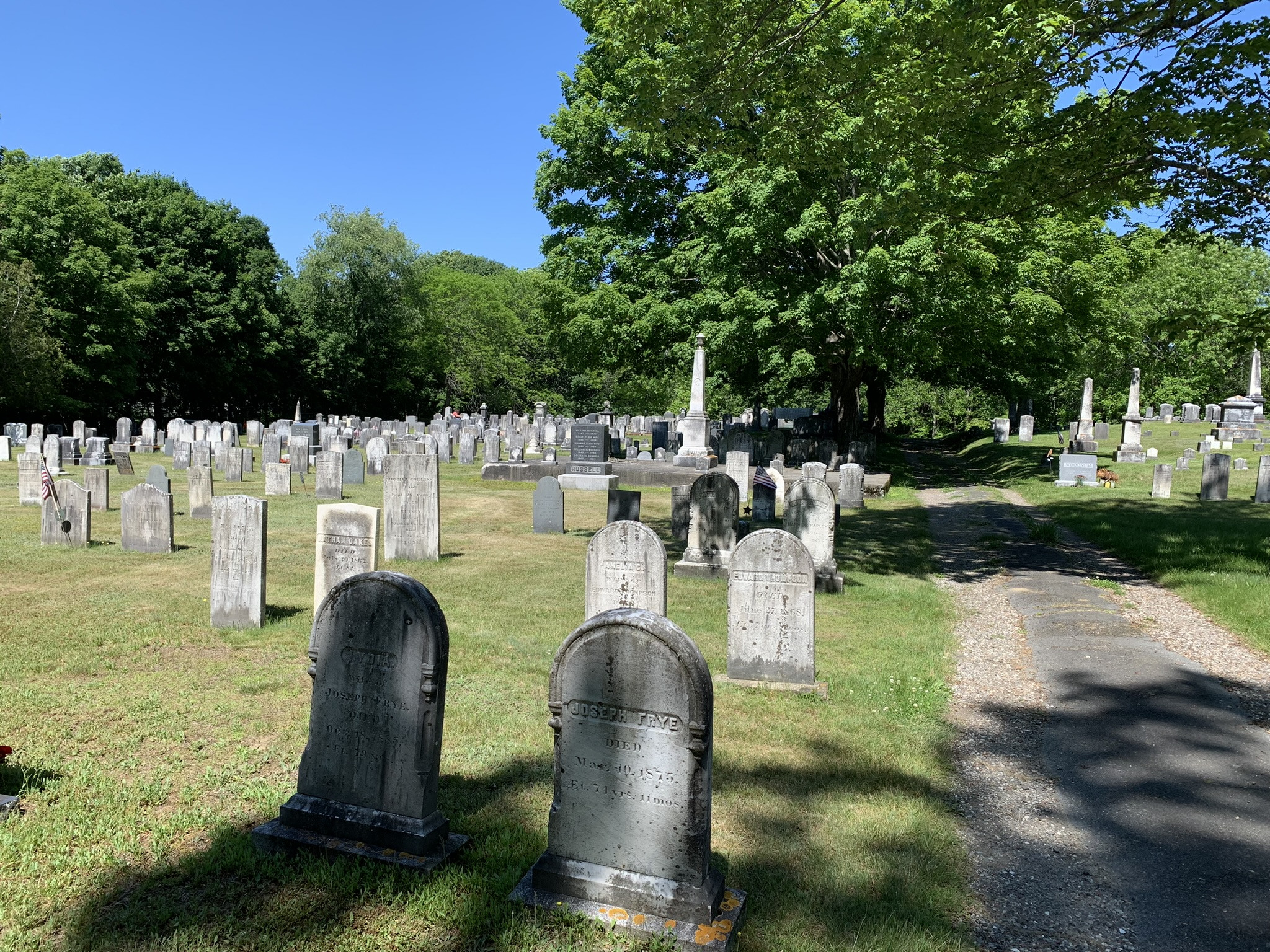
- A 2022 view of the cemetery, looking northwest from just inside the gates
- Interactive map of Old Baptist Cemetery

Details
- Established: late 17th century
- Location: Hillside Street; Yarmouth, Maine
- Country: United States
- Coordinates: 43.8033°N 70.1967°W
- Owned by: Town of Yarmouth
- Find a Grave: Old Baptist Cemetery

Old Baptist Cemetery is a historic cemetery in Yarmouth, Maine, United States. Dating to the late 17th century, it stands on Hillside Street (formerly named Brimstone Hill or Byram's Hill), adjoining the North Yarmouth and Freeport Baptist Meetinghouse, a National Register of Historic Places property, on its southern side. It is the only burial site in the town attached to an extant church building.

The meetinghouse was completed in 1796, but there are burials in the cemetery dating to the late 17th century and early 18th century. The earliest discovered burial is that of Jacob Mitchell Sr. (1643–1675).

In 2011, the previously unmarked 1870 grave site of Private William Johnson was formally dedicated at the cemetery. Johnson, of Saco, Maine, served in the 1st Maine Cavalry Regiment. The location of his grave remained unknown until a descendant of his, 91-year-old Dick Johnson, of McMinnville, Oregon, discovered via research that his great-grandfather was a Civil War veteran.

In October 2021, the gravestone of Mary Pratt (wife of David), who died in 1810, was found in the middle of Methodist Road in Westbrook, Maine, and was turned over to the local police department. It had been removed from Old Baptist Cemetery.

== Hill gravestones ==
Immediately inside the gate, on the left-hand side, are a billboard-style trio of gravestones (of members of the Hill family) – one of two in the cemetery (the other being for the Sargent family) and of 42 known to have been found in Maine.

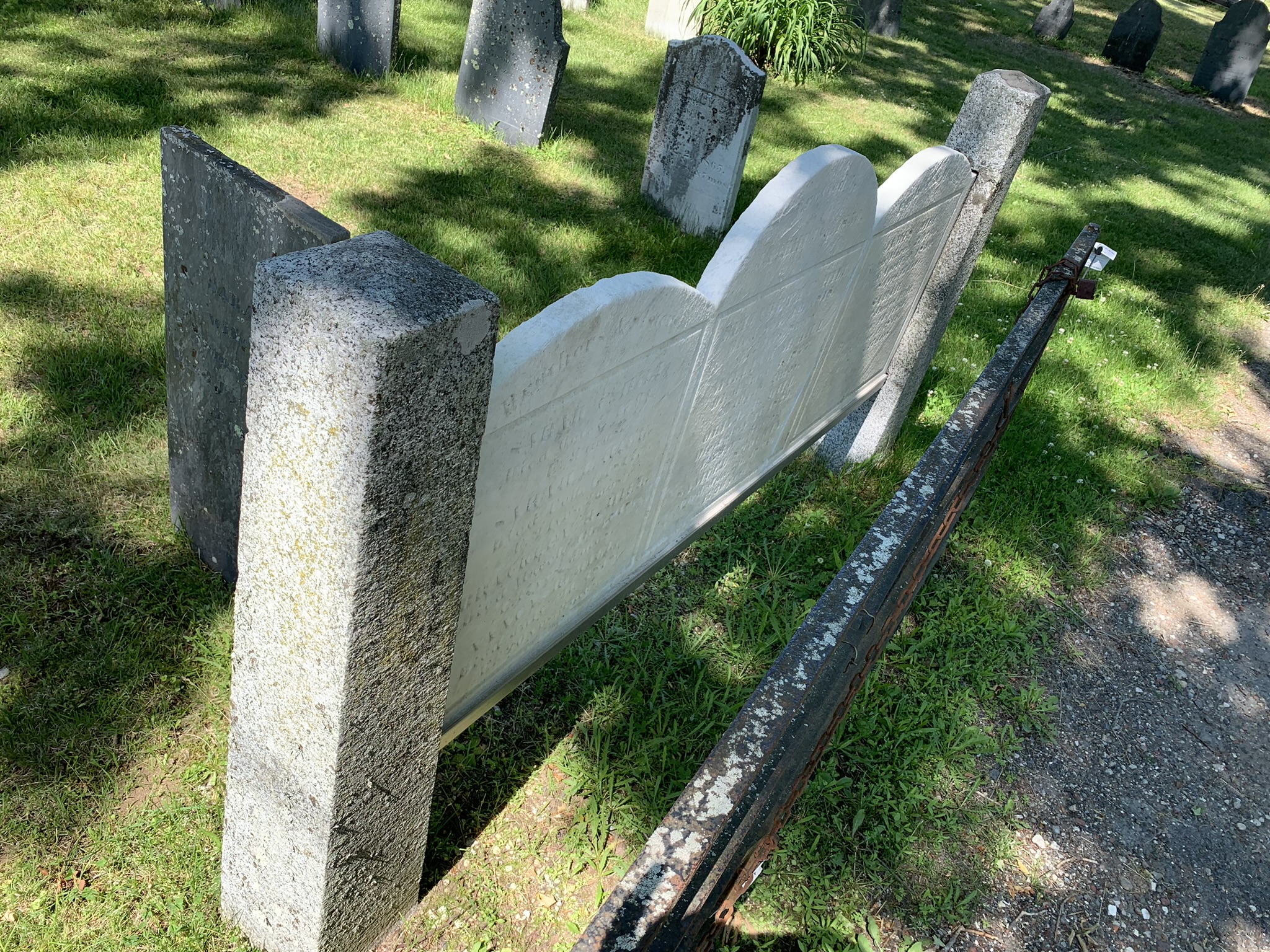
The Hill gravestones, mounted in a billboard style

== Notable burials ==
- Ammi Ruhamah Mitchell (1762–1824), town physician
- Cushing Prince (1745–1827), owner of the Cushing and Hannah Prince House, a National Register of Historic Places property
- Thomas Green (1761–1841), first pastor of the church
- William Stockbridge (1782–1850), prominent merchant, ship owner and town treasurer
- Nathaniel Foster (1781–1853), potter
- Captain Sylvanus Blanchard (1778–1858), sea captain, shipyard owner and former resident at the Capt. S. C. Blanchard House, although it is named for his son, Sylvanus Cushing Blanchard (1811–1888). Son-in-law of Cushing Prince
- Ammi Storer (1811–1874), merchant
- Ebenezer D. Lane (1814–1879), ship captain
- Frederic Gore (1860–1930), chemist and manager of the Forest Paper Company
