= Forest Paper Company =

Pulp and paper mill in Yarmouth, Maine, United States

Coordinates: 43.8046°N 70.1885°W

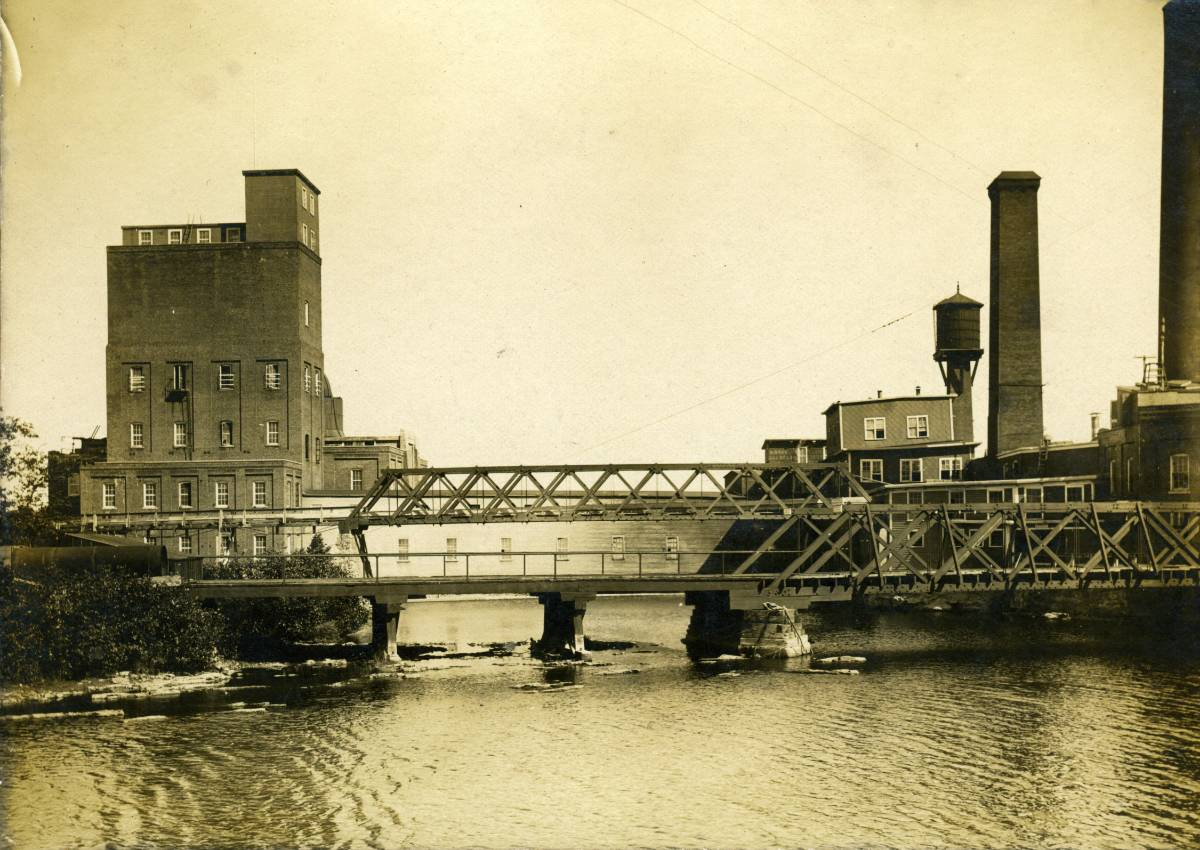
- The mill around 1900, looking north up the Royal River. Factory Island is on the right
- Predecessor: Yarmouth Paper Company
- Founded: 1874
- Founder: Samuel D. Warren; George W. Hammond
- Defunct: 1923 (103 years ago)
- Fate: Closed
- Headquarters: Yarmouth, Maine, United States
- Products: Soda pulp
- Number of employees: 275

Forest Paper Company was a pulp and paper mill on the Royal River in Yarmouth, Maine, United States, which was in business between 1874 and 1923. It was the first of its kind in New England. In 1909, it was the largest such mill in the world, employing 275 people. It produced 80 tons of poplar pulp each day.

== History ==
Located at the Third Falls, the most industrious of Yarmouth's four waterfalls, Forest Paper Company occupied a building constructed in 1872 by its predecessor, the Yarmouth Paper Company, owned by H. M. Clark, Home F. Locke and Henry Furbush. The rights to that business were purchased by Samuel Dennis Warren, owner of S. D. Warren Paper Mill in Cumberland Mills, Maine, and his nephew George W. Hammond. They changed its name to the Forest Paper Company.

Beginning with a single wooden building, the facility expanded to ten buildings covering as many acres, including a span over the river to Factory Island. The main access road to it was an extended version of today's Mill Street, off Main Street. Two bridges to it were also constructed.

In 1909, it was the largest such mill in the world, employing 275 people, including superintendent Frederic Gore. The mill used 15,000 cords (54,000 m^{3}) of poplar each year, which meant mounds of logs were constantly in view beside Mill Street. Six railroad spurs extended from the tracks running behind Main Street to the Forest Paper Company, traversing today's Royal River Park. Rail cars delivered logs, coal, soda and chlorine to the mill and carried pulp away.

Changes in papermaking after World War I made the mill less profitable, and it began to decline. Its workers unionized in August 1916 and went on strike the following month. Many never returned.

The mill closed in 1923, when import restrictions on pulp were lifted and Swedish pulp became a cheaper option.

The mill burned in 1931, leaving charred remains on the site until the development of the park in the early 1980s. In 1971, the Marine Corps Reserve tore down the old factory, before a Navy demolition team used fourteen cases of dynamite to raze the remains. Most of the remaining debris was crushed and used as fill for the park but several remnants of the building are still visible today.

== Visual timeline ==
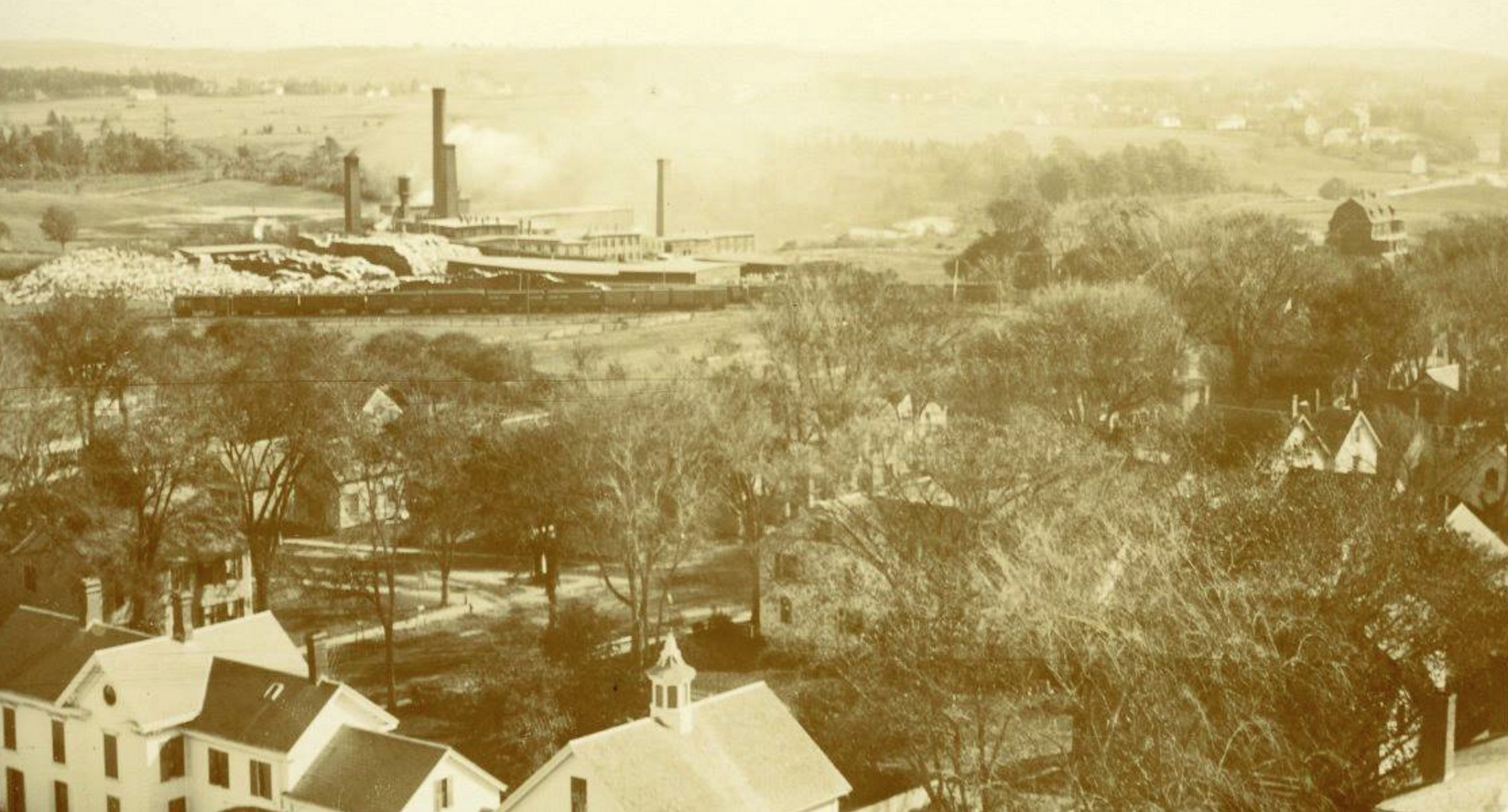
Forest Paper Company (left) and George W. Hammond's Camp Hammond (right)

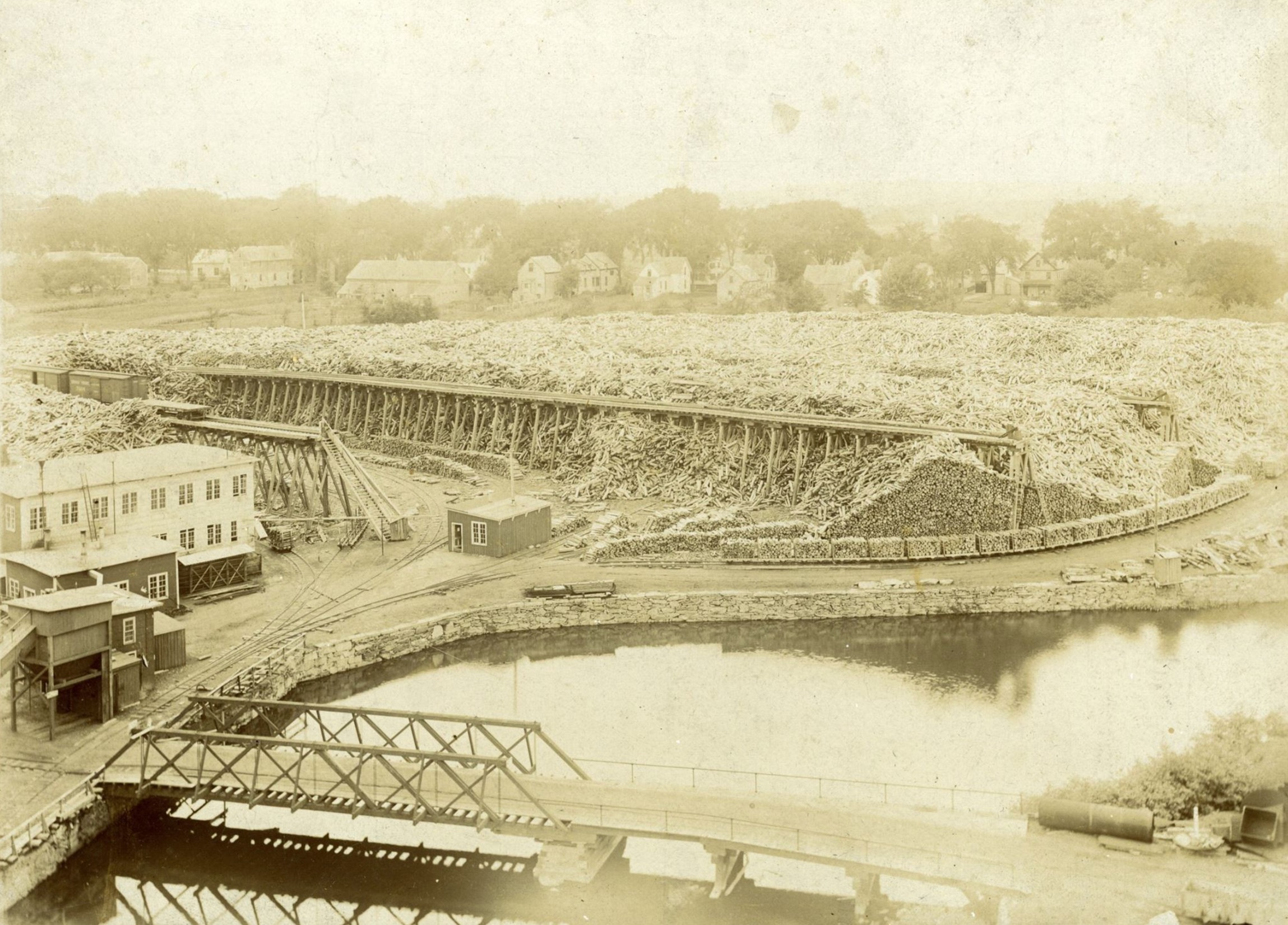
Looking northwest to Elm Street

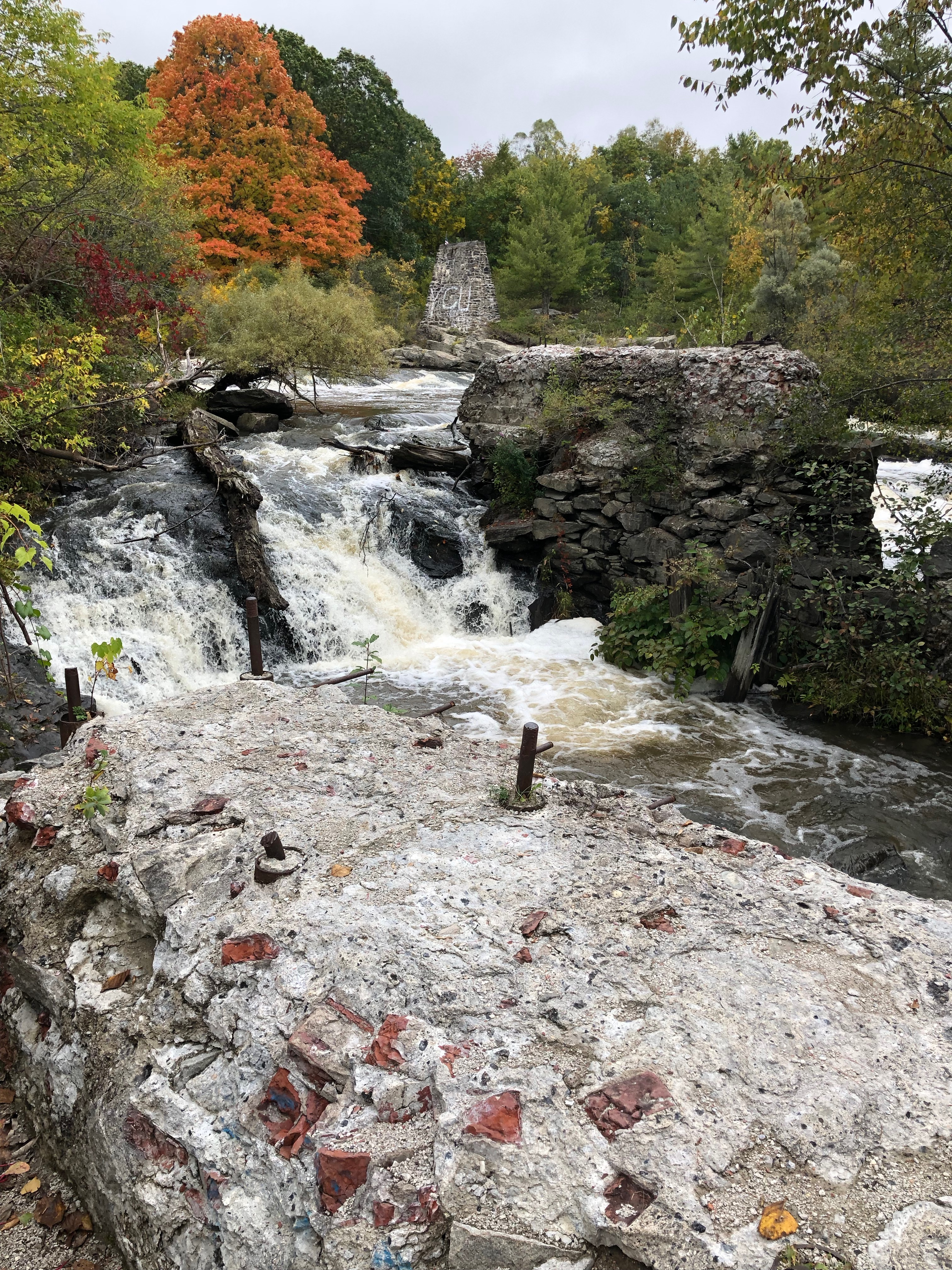
Remnants of mill foundations at the Third Falls

== See also ==
- Historical buildings and structures of Yarmouth, Maine
