= Ammi Storer =

American merchant

- Born: 1811
- Died: July 4, 1874 (aged 62–63)
- Resting place: Old Baptist Cemetery, Yarmouth, Maine, U.S.
- Occupation: merchant
- Spouse: Jane Q. Reed

Ammi Storer (1811 – July 4, 1874) was an American merchant. He was prominent in today's Yarmouth, Maine, where a street is now named for him. He also worked in Boston, Massachusetts.

== Early life ==
Storer was born in 1811 to Amos Storer and Sally True. He was their second son, after William.

== Career ==
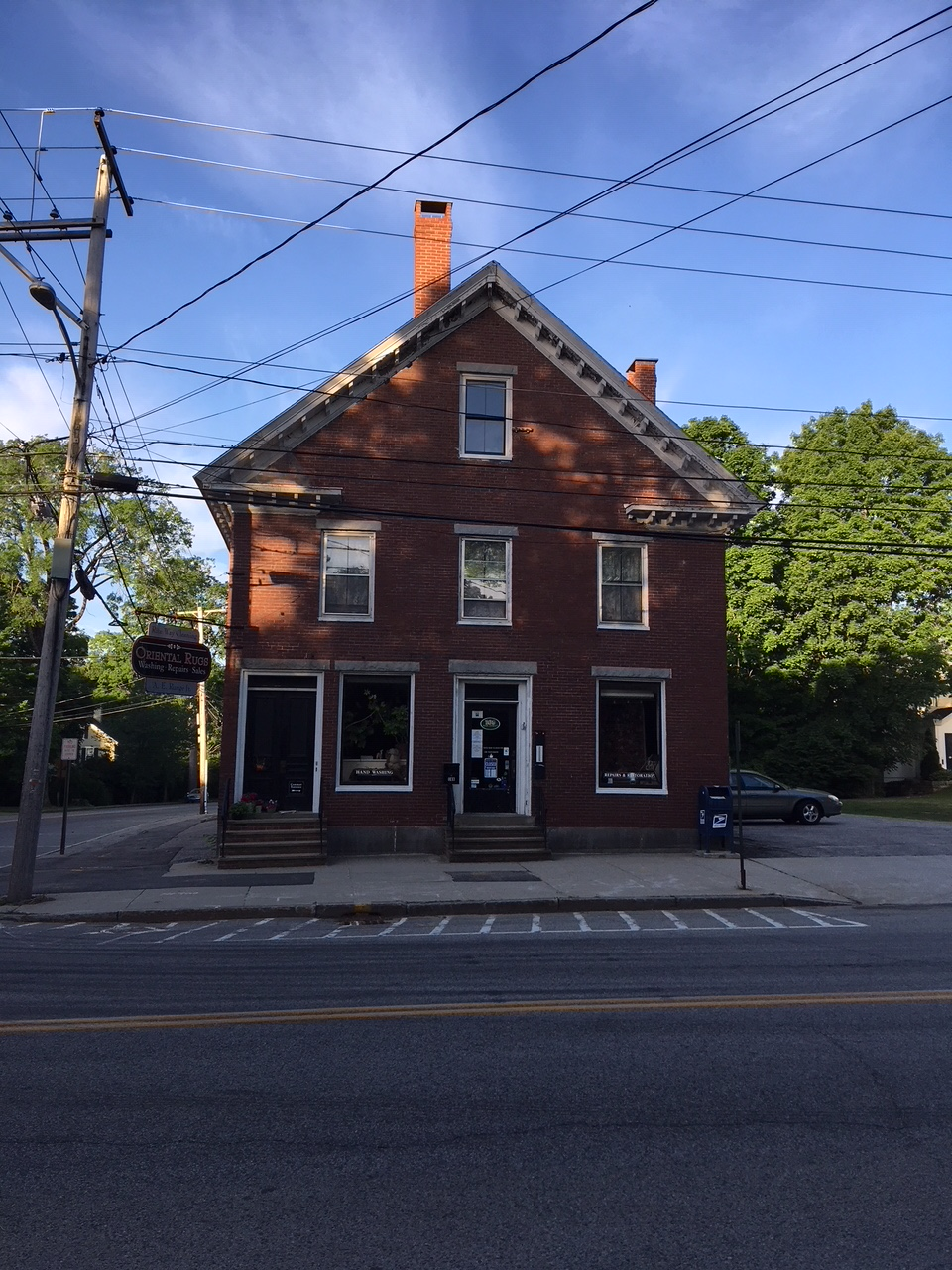
108 Main Street in Yarmouth, Maine, built by Storer in the first half of the 19th century

Storer was the first owner of a business in the brick building at today's 108 Main Street, at its intersection with Portland Street, in what was then North Yarmouth, Massachusetts.

In July 1849, Storer wrote a petition to the Maine Legislature to divide North Yarmouth and create a new town. It was a repeat of a request from 1828. Both were denied (the second initially, but accepted the following month).

== Personal life ==
Storer married Jane Q. Reed, with whom he had two children: Ferdinand Ingraham (born 1841) and William Dana (born 1850). William died at the age of five.

In the mid-19th century, Storer was one of four men who submitted an affidavit requesting the release of Yarmouth ship owner Cyrus F. Sargent.

== Death ==
Storer died in Boston on Independence Day, 1874. He was aged 62 or 63. He was interred in Yarmouth's Old Baptist Cemetery. His wife survived him by eleven years and was buried alongside him.

Yarmouth's Storer Street, off Portland Street, is named for him.
