= Royal River Park =

Public park in Yarmouth, Maine, US

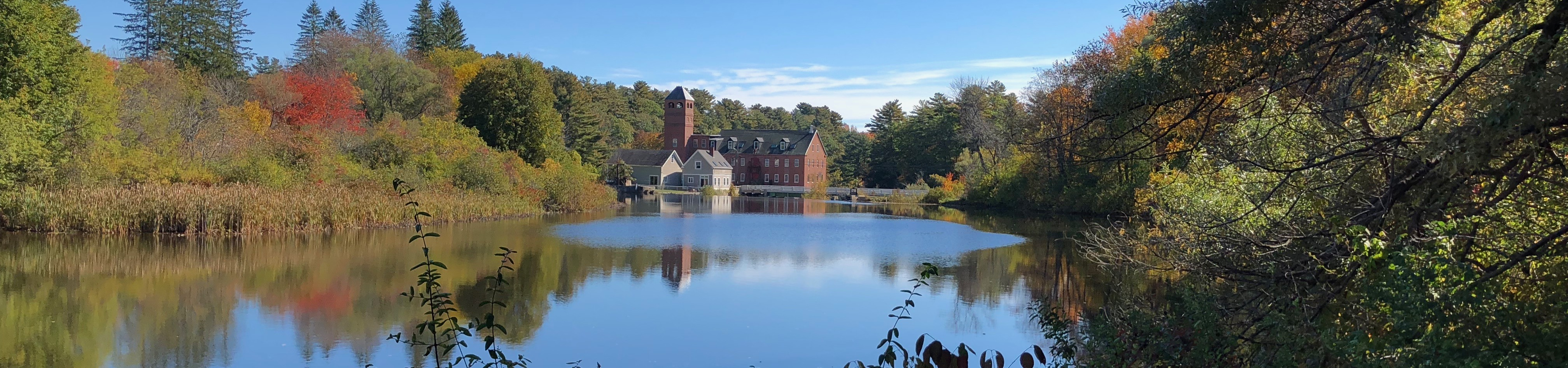
- Looking east down the Royal River from beneath the U.S. Route 1 overpass in the park
- Interactive map of Royal River Park
- Type: Urban park
- Location: Yarmouth, Maine, U.S.
- Coordinates: 43.8051067°N 70.1895148°W
- Created: 1980s
- Owner: Town of Yarmouth
- Open: Dawn to dusk daily

Royal River Park is an urban park in Yarmouth, Maine, United States. It is located to the northwest of the town center, between East Elm Street to the west and Bridge Street to the east. U.S. Route 1 runs through the park via an overpass.

The park is named for the Royal River, which passes through the park at its northern extremity, about 0.5 miles (0.80 km) west of Yarmouth's harbor, into which it empties after its 39 miles (63 km) journey from its source. The park runs along the southern banks of the river for about 0.57 miles (0.92 km). At its widest point, the park is about 700 feet (210 m) wide.

The park has entrances at East Elm Street, Mill Street, Yarmouth Crossing Drive, William H. Rowe Elementary School and Bridge Street.

The more easterly of the two pedestrian bridges in the Royal River Park is built on old abutments for a trolley line which ran between Yarmouth and Freeport between 1906 and 1933. The Beth Condon Memorial Pathway crosses the bridge.

Three of the town's four waterfalls are within the bounds of the park. The Third (or Baker) Falls were, by far, the most industrious of the four. The first buildings — Jeremiah Baker's grist mill, a carding mill and a nail mill — wears erected in 1805 on the eastern side of the river. On the western (or town) side of the river was a scythe and axe factory owned by Joseph C. Batchelder. Benjamin Gooch's fulling mill followed in 1830, but it later moved to the Fourth Falls.

The Yarmouth Paper Company, which produced paper pulp, was built in 1864. The main access road to it was an extended version of today's Mill Street, off Main Street. The original building burned in 1870. Two years later, a soda pulp mill — named C.D. Brown Paper Company — was built, to which Samuel Dennis Warren and George Warren Hammond bought the rights in 1874 and renamed it the Forest Paper Company. Beginning with a single wooden building, the facility expanded to ten buildings covering as many acres, including a span over the river to Factory Island. Two bridges to it were also constructed. In 1909, it was the largest such mill in the world, employing 275 people. The mill used 15,000 cords (54,000 m^{3}) of poplar each year, which meant mounds of logs were constantly in view beside Mill Street. Six railroad spurs extended from the tracks running behind Main Street to the Forest Paper Company, traversing today's Royal River Park. Rail cars delivered logs, coal, soda and chlorine to the mill and carried pulp away. The mill closed in 1923, when import restrictions on pulp were lifted and Swedish pulp became a cheaper option. The mill burned in 1931, leaving charred remains on the site until the development of the Royal River Park in the early 1980s. In 1971, the Marine Corps Reserve tore down the old factory, before a Navy demolition team used fourteen cases of dynamite to raze the remains. Most of the remaining debris was crushed and used as fill for the park but several remnants of the building are still visible today.

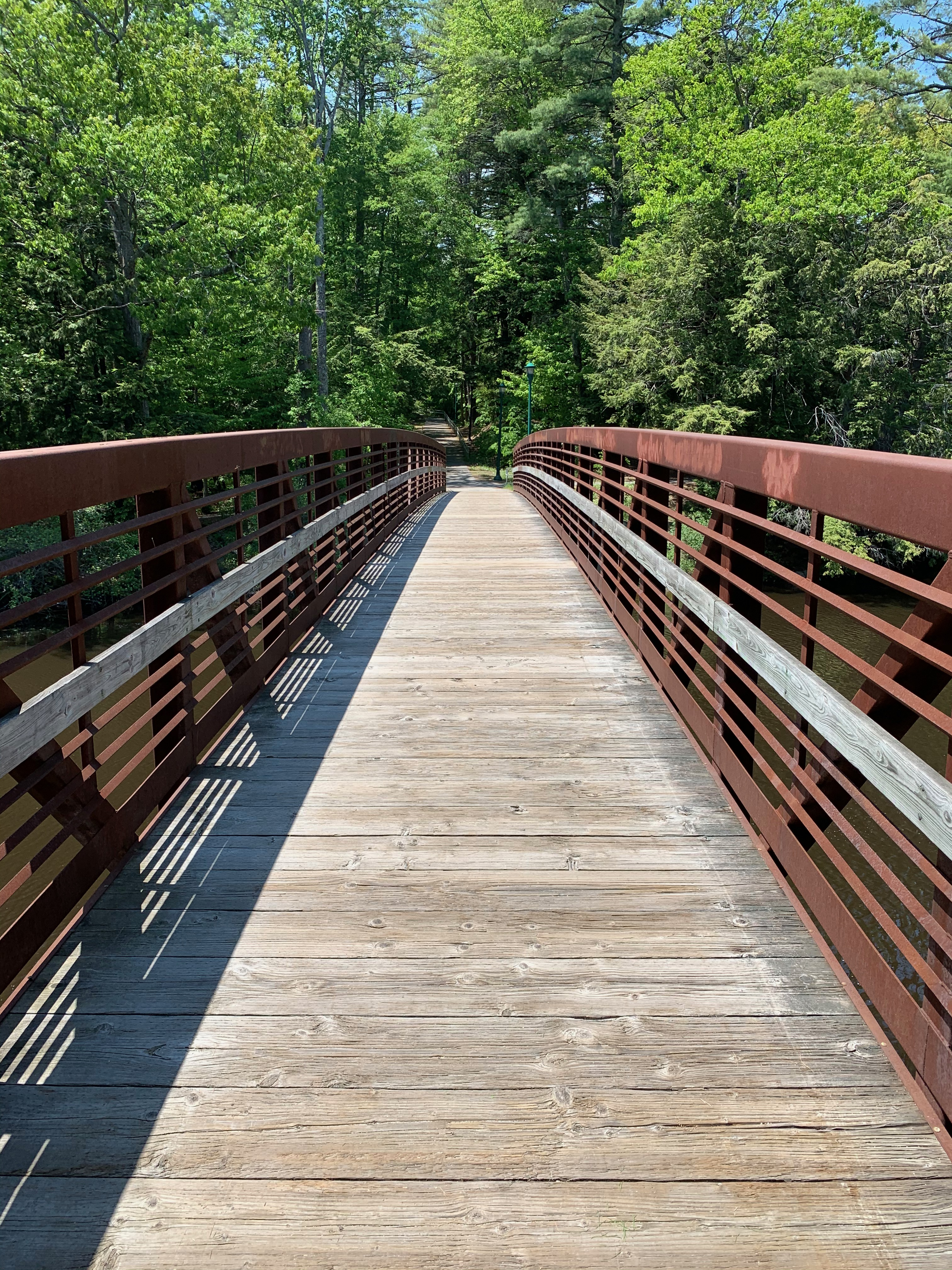
Pedestrian bridge across the Royal River

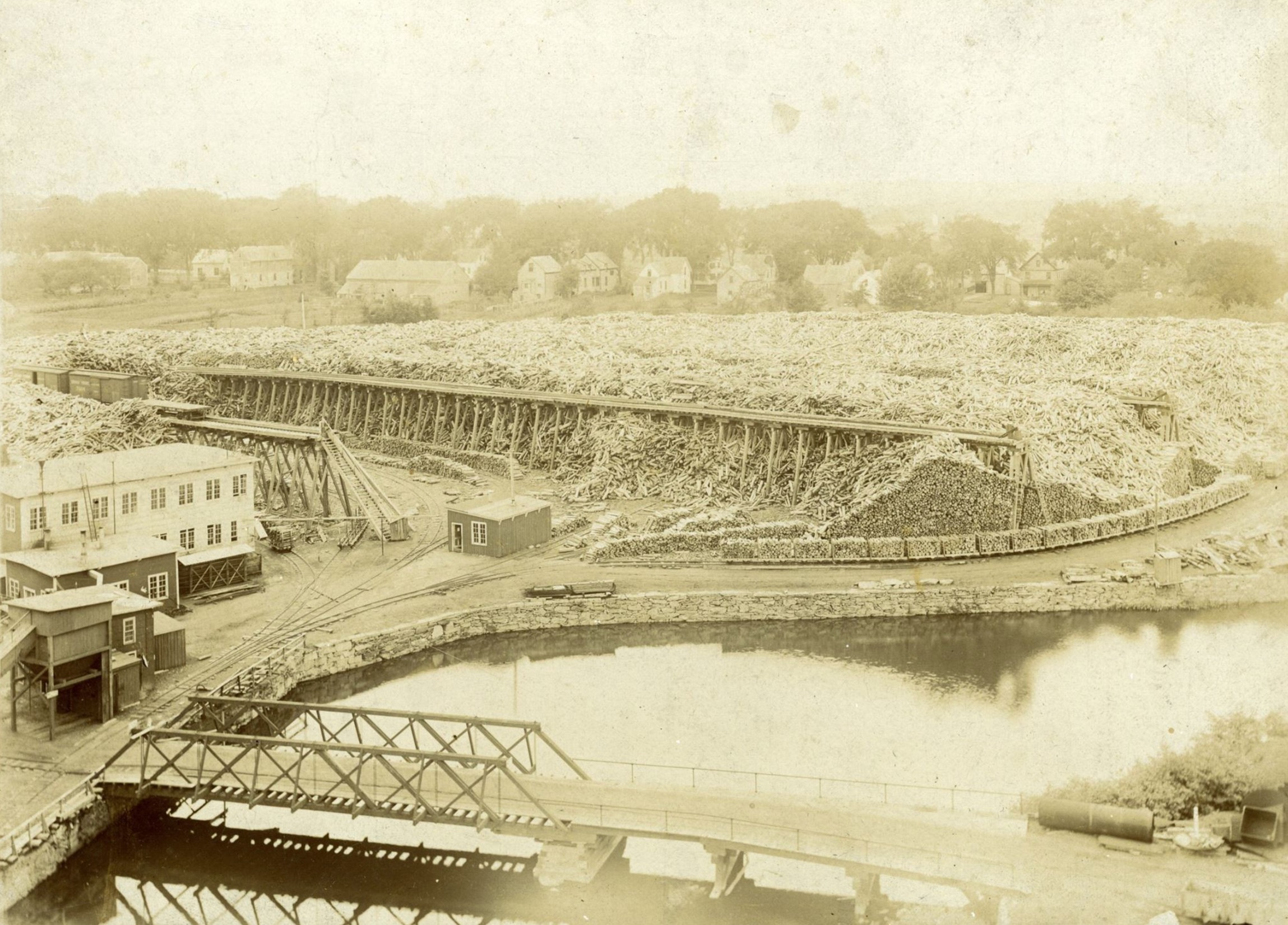
Forest Paper Company's log pile in the park

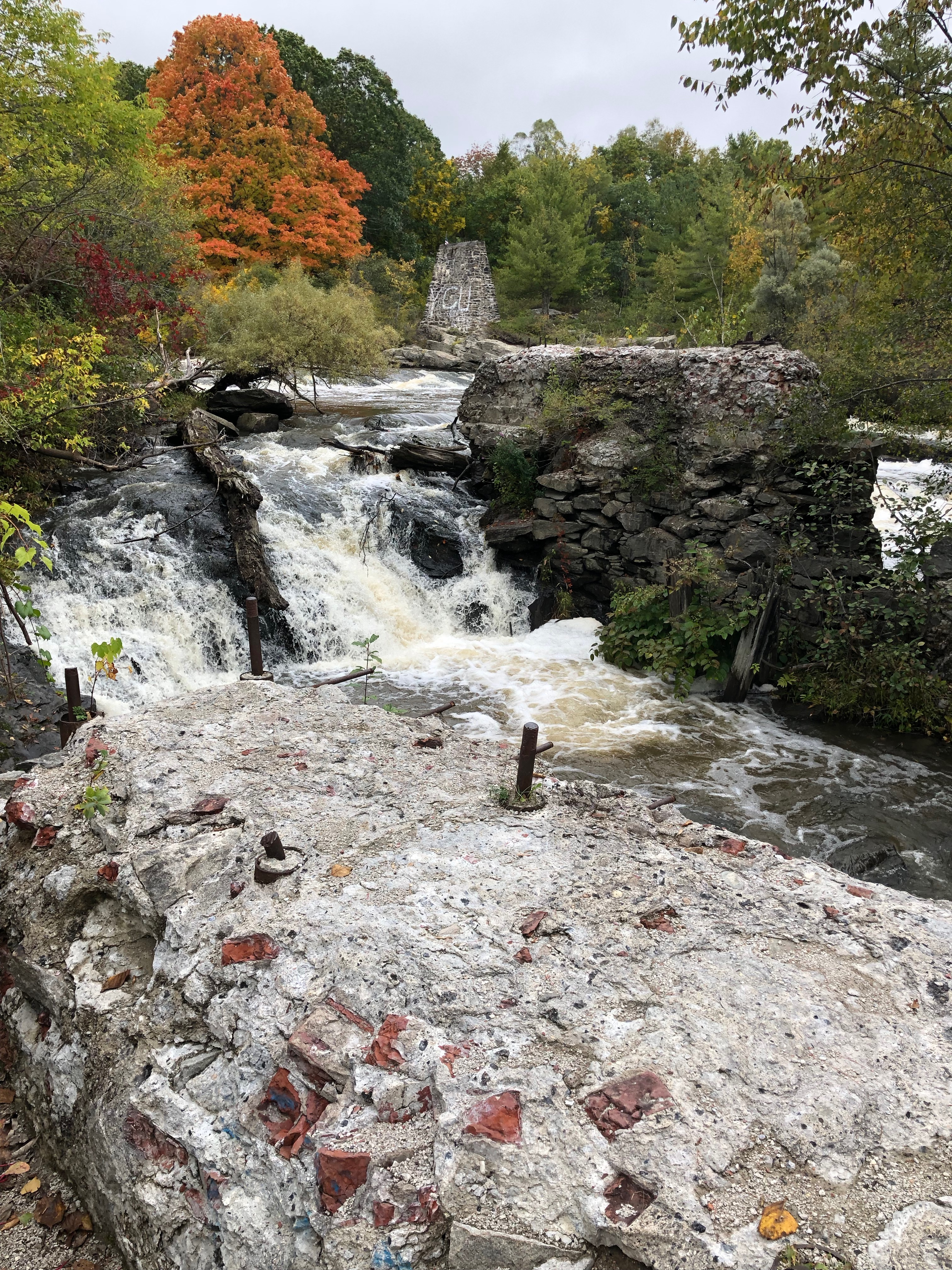
Remnants of the mill's foundations on Baker Falls' Factory Island in the park
