= Frederic Gore =

American chemist

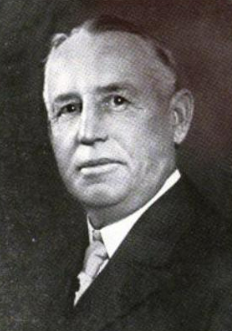
- Gore, pictured around 1915
- Born: 1860
- Died: 1930 (aged 69–70); Yarmouth, Maine, U.S.
- Resting place: Old Baptist Cemetery, Yarmouth, Maine, U.S.
- Spouse: Angie T. Jordan (–1930; his death)

Frederic E. Gore (1860–1930) was a 19th- and 20th-century chemist from Yarmouth, Maine. He became the manager of the Forest Paper Company, which was in business between 1874 and 1923. In 1909, it was the largest such mill in the world.

== Life and career ==
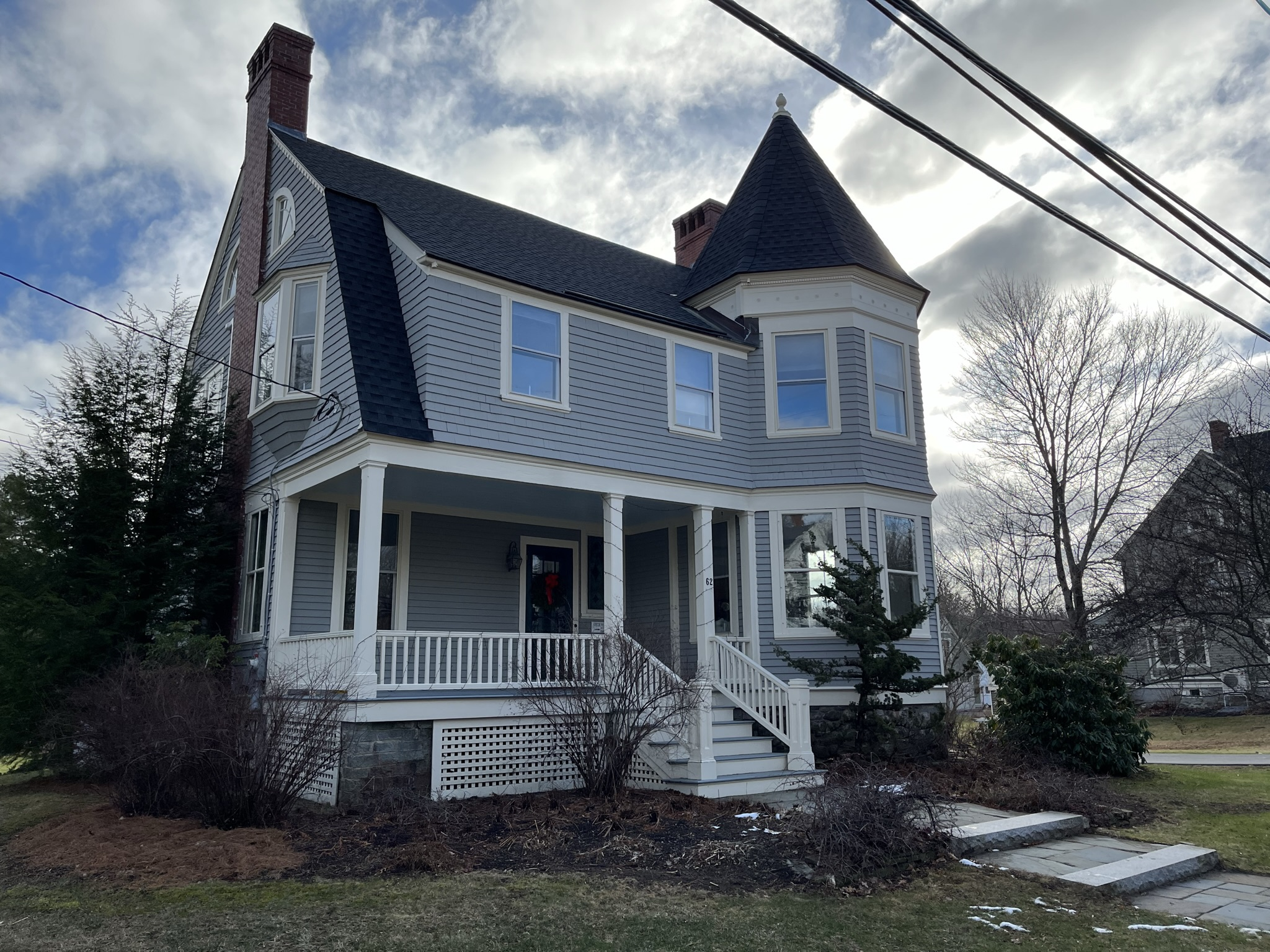
The former Gore family residence at 62 South Street in Yarmouth, Maine (2022)

Gore was born in 1860. He studied chemistry at the Massachusetts Institute of Technology.

He married Angie T. Jordan, and they lived at today's 1896-built 62 South Street in Yarmouth. The property is now known as the Frederic Gore House.

In 1903, while assignor to S. D. Warren & Co., Gore had patented (number 725.071) cooking cellulose fiber. "The fiber is digested with caustic soda, diluted with spent soda liquor, afterwards transferring the dilute liquor from the fiber to reactivate contact with calcium hydroxide, then returning the liquor to the fiber, this maintaining the efficiency of the soda liquor."

Gore became superintendent of Yarmouth's Forest Paper Company around the time of its being the largest such mill in the world.

In 1917, during the 22nd annual meeting of the Hawaiian Sugar Planters' Association, Gore was stated as having had 35 years of experience with digesters.

== Death ==
Gore died in 1930, aged 69 or 70. He was interred in Yarmouth's Old Baptist Cemetery, around 0.25 miles (0.40 km) northwest of his home. His wife survived him by nine years; she was buried alongside him. According to Yarmouth historian Alan M. Hall: "Mrs. Gore reportedly enjoyed [her] lifestyle, but lamented that they never had any children."
