= George W. Hammond =

American businessman

George Warren Hammond
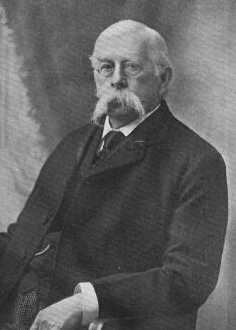
- Hammond around 1900
- Born: April 4, 1833; Grafton, Massachusetts, U.S.
- Died: January 6, 1908 (aged 74); Yarmouth, Maine, U.S.
- Resting place: Mount Auburn Cemetery, Cambridge, Massachusetts, U.S.
- Occupation: Businessman
- Years active: 1853–1906
- Board member of: Maine Legislature (1868–1870); Maine Board of Agriculture; Yarmouth Water Committee (president); Trustees of Merrill Memorial Library, Yarmouth (chairman); Gorham Academy (trustee); Overseers' Committee, Harvard University Herbaria (1888–1908)
- Spouse: Ellen Sarah Sophia (née Clarke) (1874–1905; her death)

George Warren Hammond (April 4, 1833 – January 6, 1908) was an American businessman. Camp Hammond, in Yarmouth, Maine, is named for him. He was also one of its architects. Built in 1889 (137 years ago), it was placed on the National Register of Historic Places in 1979.

Hammond was also co-owner of Forest Paper Company, which was the largest paper mill in the world at the time of his death. The mill was also known as a pioneer in the processing of soda pulp.

== Early life ==
Hammond was born on April 4, 1833, in Grafton, Massachusetts, to Josiah and Anna Warren. One of his siblings, William Henry (1841–1908), followed him to Maine. He worked in Portland until his death, a few months after George, at the age of 67. His body was returned to the family's hometown of Grafton for interment.

He received an honorary degree of Master of Arts degree from Bowdoin College in 1900.

== Career ==
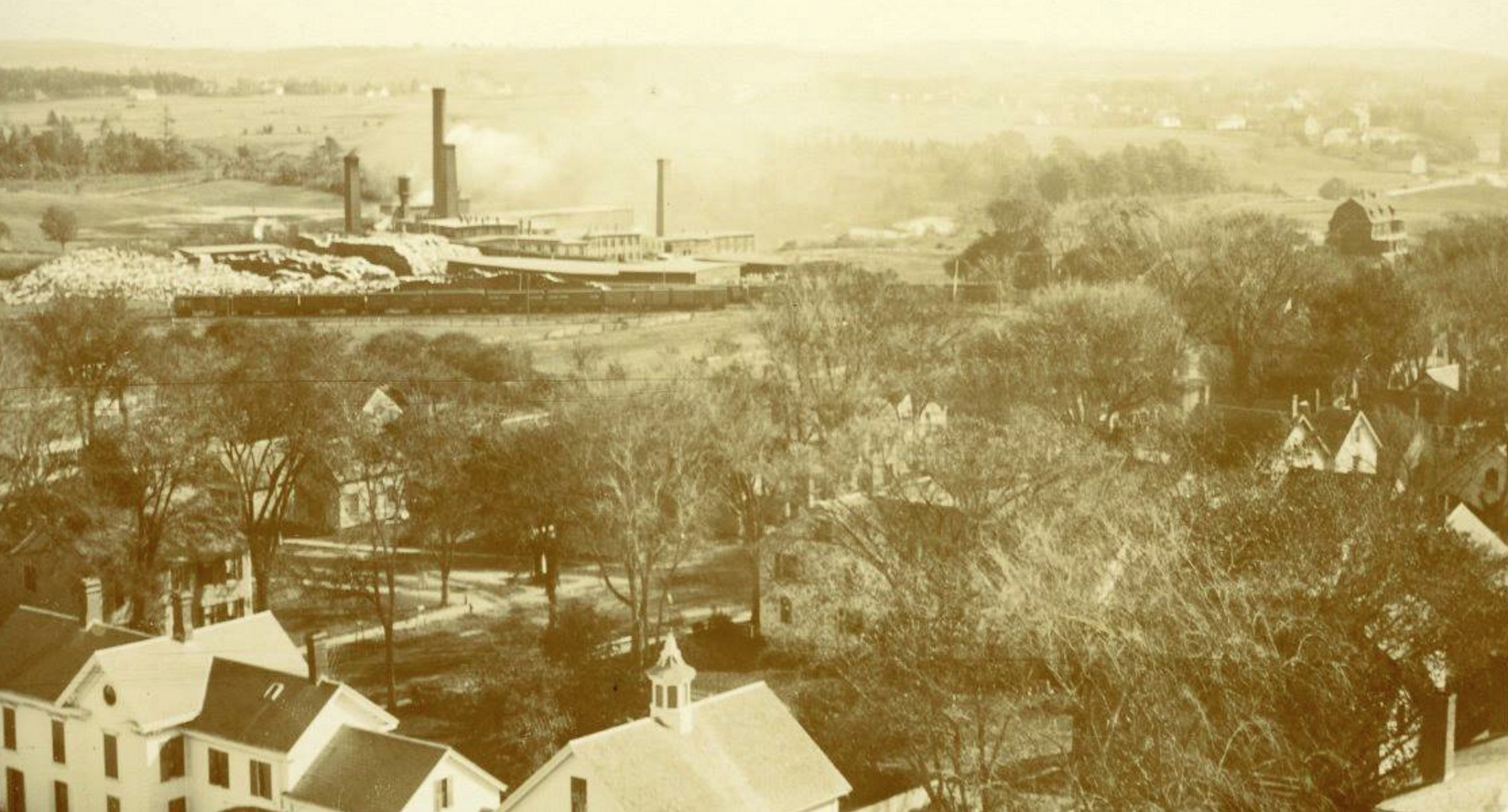
Forest Paper Company, viewed from the top of the meetinghouse on Hillside Street, looking southeast. Camp Hammond is in the top right (c.1900)

After finishing school, Hammond began working at Howe & Leeds Wholesale West India Goods Store on Boston's Long Wharf. The same year, he became a clerk with J. W. Blodgett & Co.

Hammond attended the Massachusetts Institute of Technology as a special student on the chemistry of paper manufacturing.

After moving to Maine part-time, in 1853 he accepted a position at his uncle Samuel Dennis Warren's S. D. Warren Paper Mill in Cumberland Mills. By 1857, he was superintendent, a role in which remained for five years. His next position was as the mill's agent.

In 1874, Hammond and Warren bought the rights to Yarmouth Paper Company, in Yarmouth, Maine, at the town's Third Falls. They renamed it Forest Paper Company. Beginning with a single wooden building, the facility expanded to ten buildings covering as many acres, including a span over the Royal River to Factory Island. Two bridges to it were also constructed. In 1909, the year following Hammond's death, it was the largest such mill in the world, employing 275 people. Hammond also worked at the S. D. Warren mill until 1876, before transferring full-time to Yarmouth as the manager of the new business. The mill became known as a pioneer in the processing of soda pulp.

Hammond retired from active business on January 1, 1906.

== Personal life ==
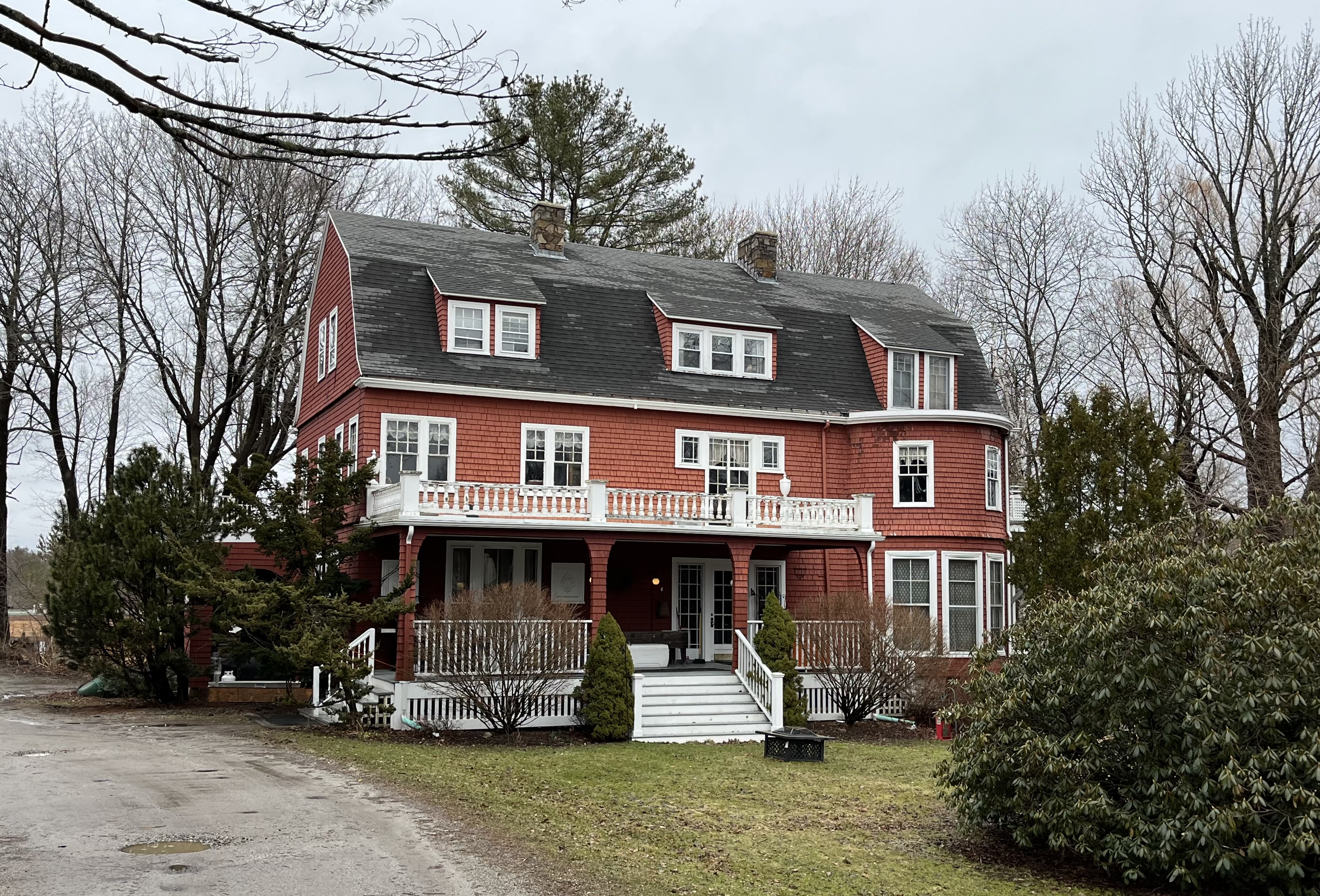
Camp Hammond, 2023

Hammond married Ellen Sarah Sophia Clarke (1833–1905), the sister-in-law of Samuel Warren, in 1874. Hammond survived her by three years upon her death in 1905.

Along with New York architect Alexander Twombly, who was the engineer and draftsman of Forest Paper Company, Hammond designed what is today known as Camp Hammond, set back from Yarmouth's Main Street and from which Hammond could see his mill. Twombly also designed several buildings in Boston. Frederick Law Olmsted, who designed Central Park in New York City, designed the gardens of the property. With the Hammonds splitting their time between Boston and Yarmouth, the property became known as the Camp.

The Hammonds also formed the Antiquarian Society in order to facilitate the 1890 purchase of the North Yarmouth and Freeport Baptist Meetinghouse on Yarmouth's Hillside Street. It became a library and museum, known as the Hillside Library.

Among the many roles Hammond took on without payment was as president of the Yarmouth Water Committee, established in 1895, which sourced its water supply from Hammond Spring on the property of Forest Paper Company. Hammond donated Forest Paper Company land for the 1903 construction of Merrill Memorial Library, on Main Street, which was designed by Alexander Longfellow, a nephew of the poet Henry Wadsworth Longfellow.

Hammond served in the Maine Legislature between 1868 and 1870, was on the Maine Board of Agriculture and the board of trustees of North Yarmouth Academy, was a member of the American Association for the Advancement of Science, the Society of Chemical Industry, the American Institute of Mining, Metallurgical, and Petroleum Engineers, The Society of Arts and Crafts of Boston, the Massachusetts Historical Society, the New England Historic Genealogical Society (from January 1876), The Bostonian Society and the Franklin Institute. He was also a Freemason.

A member of the American Horticultural Society, he was a keen arborist, and his knowledge of trees and plants earned him a place on the Overseers' Committee at Harvard University's Gray Herbarium between 1888 and the time of his death.

The Hammonds were members of Yarmouth's First Parish Congregational Church and Boston's Trinity Church.

=== Death ===
Hammond died on January 6, 1908, aged 74. He is interred in Mount Auburn Cemetery, Cambridge, Massachusetts.
