= Beth Condon Memorial Pathway =

Recreation walkway in Yarmouth, Maine, US

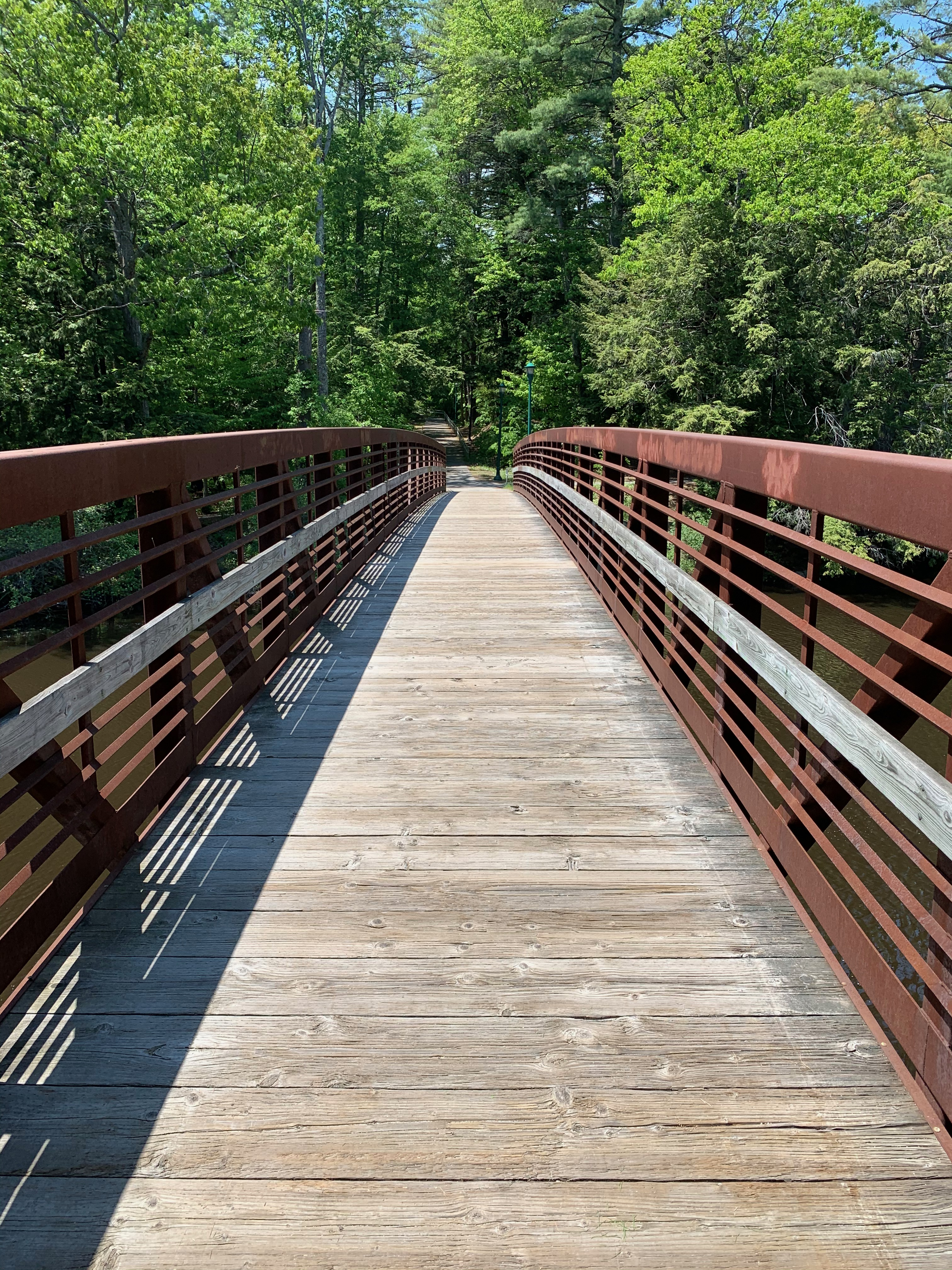
- This pedestrian bridge in Royal River Park takes the path over the Royal River
- Length: 1.7 mi (2.7 km)
- Location: Yarmouth, Maine, U.S.
- Established: 1997 (29 years ago)
- Use: Walking; Running; Cycling
- Difficulty: Easy
- Season: All year
- Sights: Royal River Park

The Beth Condon Memorial Pathway is a recreation path in Yarmouth, Maine, United States. It is named in memory of 15-year-old Yarmouth High School sophomore Elizabeth Ann Condon, who was killed by drunk driver Martha Burke in 1993 as she walked along U.S. Route 1 with her boyfriend, James Young, having just been to a video store in Yarmouth Marketplace. Burke's car swerved into the breakdown lane, and while Young managed to avoid the car, Condon was hit and thrown 65 feet (20 m) over the guardrail and down an embankment. Burke pleaded guilty to manslaughter and was sentenced to twelve years, with eight years suspended.

== Course ==
The path originates on the western side of the Portland Street and Route 1 intersection. The first section of the pathway was begun in 1997 and cost $100,000. 80% of this was funded by the Maine Department of Transportation. This original part runs north from Lane's Crossing, parallel to Route 1, and ends at the parking lot of Yarmouth Town Hall on Cleaves Street. It is at this juncture, where Condon died, that a butterfly garden was built in her memorial. A granite memorial, dedicated by her classmates of 1996, was erected in the garden. It was rededicated on August 2, 2014, a few weeks before the 21st anniversary of her death.

In 1998, an extension was added to the pathway that took the path along Cleaves Street, School Street and into the Royal River Park, where it intersects with a recreational path. A pedestrian bridge, donated by the Yarmouth Lions Club in 1998, carries it over the Royal River en route to Forest Falls Drive.

In 2006, a third phase added a section that extended the path to the Hannaford plaza and, after previously having an almost-500-yard gap, a ramp connecting Route 1 up the hill to East Main Street. Talk of bridging this gap, part of which goes beneath the East Main Street bridge spanning Route 1, began in 2011, with a planned start date of 2013. It would bring the total length of the pathway to 1.7 miles (2.7 km); however, the traffic cones that were set out along the route on July 22, 2013, remained in place until September 2014, despite a statement that the original plan to monitor traffic flow was to take "several weeks". The two-lane southbound side of the road was permanently reduced to one at the same time. The project was completed the following month.

In 2000, the pathway was integrated as part of the East Coast Greenway, a project to create a nearly 3,000-mile (4,800-km) urban path linking the major cities of the Atlantic coast, from Calais, Maine, to Key West, Florida, for non-motorized transportation.

In 2023, the town began expanding the pathway around 2,400 feet (732 m) to the traffic signals at exit 17 of Interstate 295. A further extension will have it cross Route 1, passing the entrance to the Garmin building, a few yards beyond the I-295 northbound off-ramp, and ending at the Cousins River Bridge. There are also plans to extend the pathway south, to the border with Cumberland, thus meaning the path runs all the way through Yarmouth.

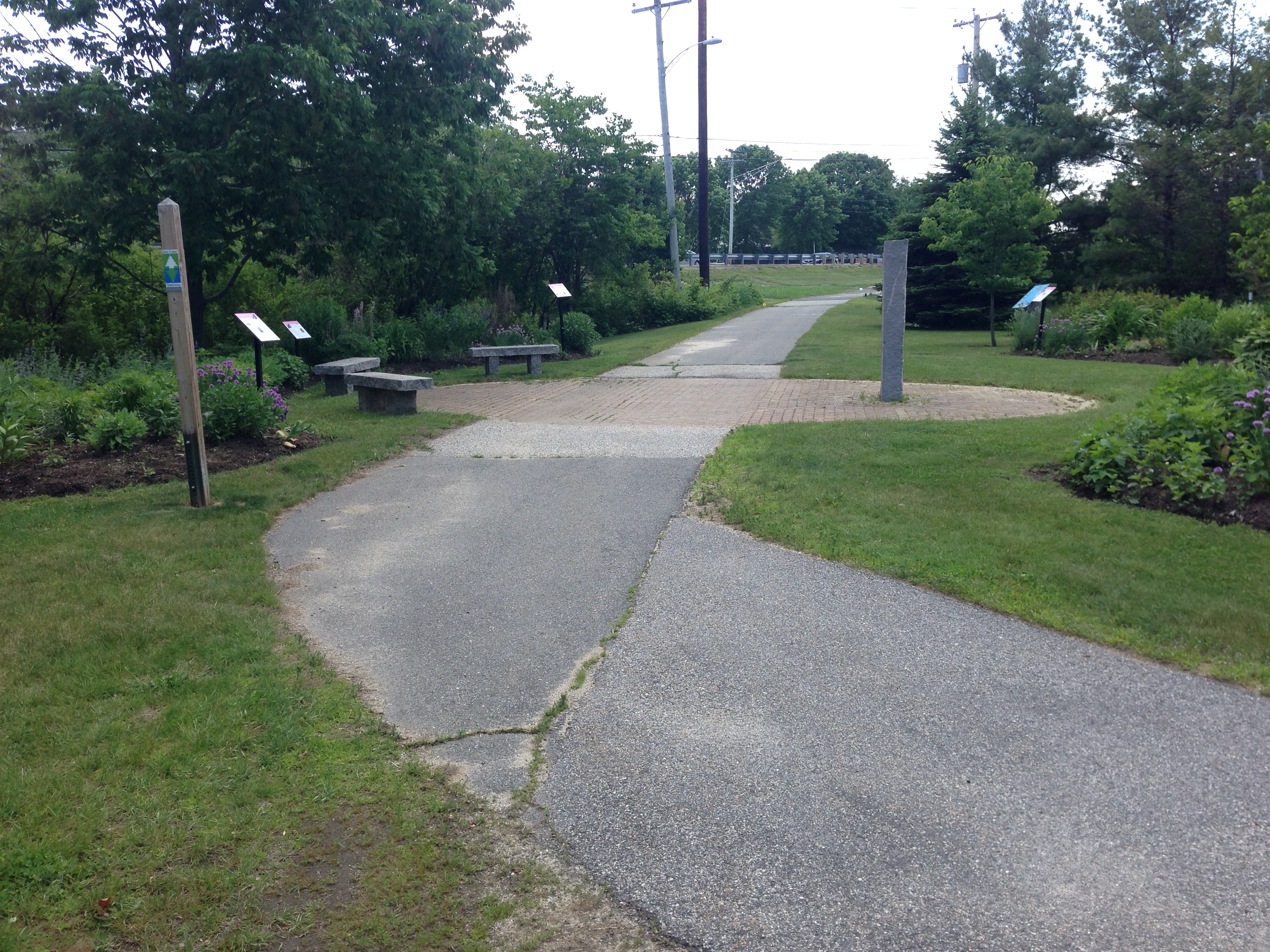
Butterfly garden, 2015, looking south

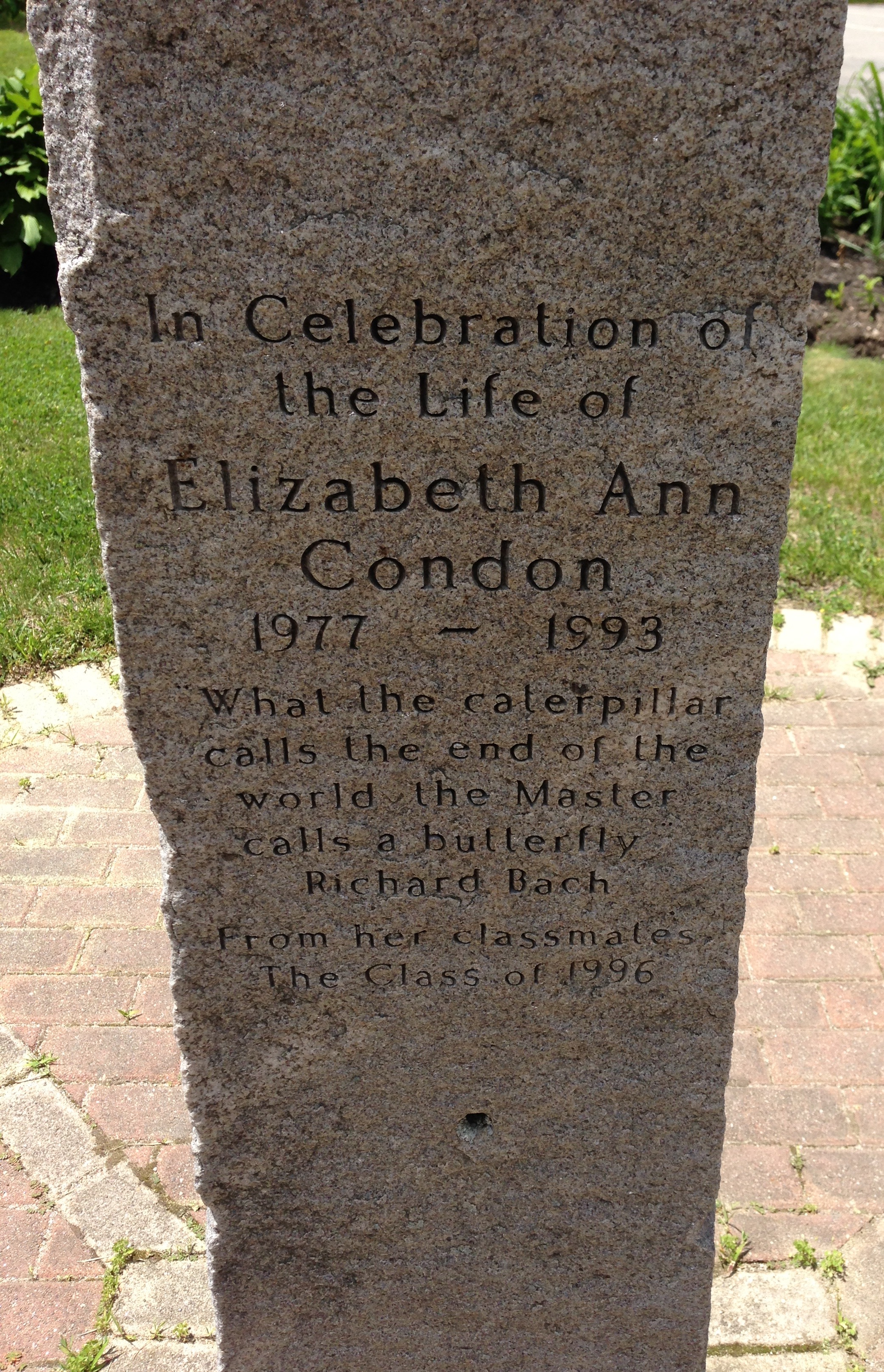
Memorial at the butterfly garden

== Beth Condon ==
Beth Condon
- Condon pictured around 1993
- Born: Elizabeth Ann Condon; November 6, 1977; Portland, Maine, U.S.
- Died: August 28, 1993 (aged 15); Yarmouth, Maine, U.S.
- Resting place: Burr Cemetery, Freeport, Maine, U.S.
- Parent(s): Carl Condon; Andrea Dahlgren Condon

Elizabeth Ann Condon was born on November 6, 1977, in Portland, Maine, to Carl and Andrea. She was an honors student, a member of the school's soccer team, and played the flute in the school band. She was also a member of the school choir and took part in school play productions.

Condon was killed on August 28, 1993, a few days before her sophomore year at Yarmouth High School was to begin. Her funeral was held at the United Methodist Church in Cumberland on September 1, after which she was interred in Freeport's Burr Cemetery.

After Condon's death, her father, Carl, established the Beth Condon Scholarship at her former high school. He died in 2018 and is buried next to her at Burr Cemetery.
