= Portland Street (Yarmouth, Maine) =

Prominent street in Yarmouth, Maine

Coordinates: 43.792085°N 70.189362°W

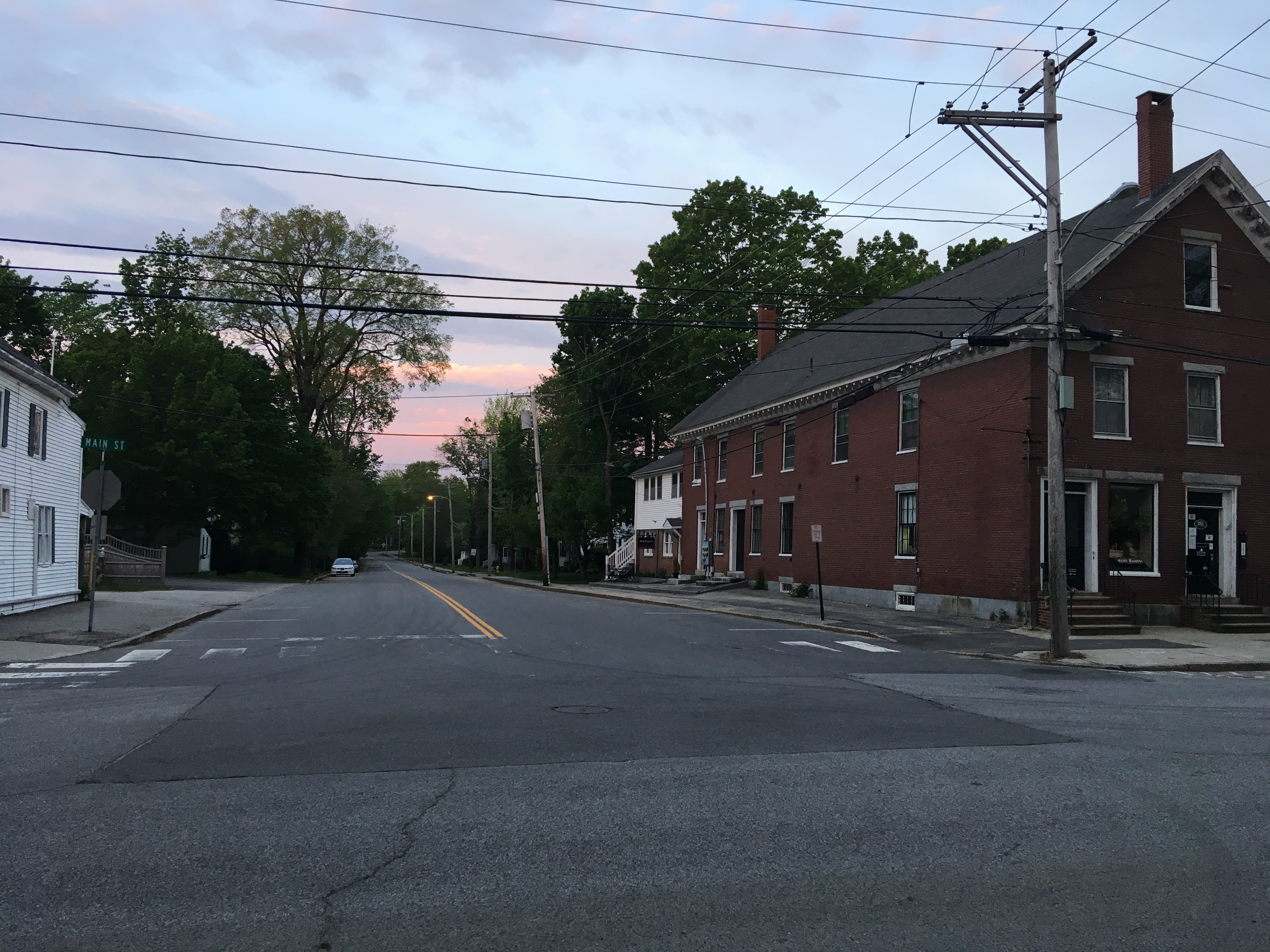
- The northern end of Portland Street, at Yarmouth's Main Street, in 2017
- Interactive map of Portland Street
- Length: 1.25 mi (2.01 km)
- Location: Yarmouth, Maine, U.S.
- Northern end: Main Street (State Route 115)
- Major junctions: U.S. Route 1
- Southern end: Middle Road

Portland Street is a historic street in Yarmouth, Maine, United States. It runs for about 1.25 miles (2.01 km) from the town's Main Street, State Route 115, in the north to its merge with Middle Road in the south. It is so named because it leads to Portland, the state's largest city, after linking up with State Route 9 in Falmouth, Maine. (Yarmouth's Elm Street, which runs parallel to Portland Street around a half mile to the northwest, was formerly known as the "Portland road", for it was an early route into Portland prior to the Presumpscot River being bridged at Martin's Point in Falmouth Foreside.)

Today's Portland Street is bisected near its halfway point by U.S. Route 1. The Beth Condon Memorial Pathway, part of the East Coast Greenway, originates on the western side of the Portland Street and Route 1 intersection.

The Central Parish Church has stood opposite the northern end of Portland Street since 1860. It is now on the National Register of Historic Places.

== History ==
By 1847, Portland Street was in full swing, including the Elm Street offshoot that headed directly into the Upper Village. Main Street was, by now, well established.

== Architecture ==
Each property below is located on the eastern portion of Portland Street (that is, the stretch of the street that runs to and from Lower Falls).

The former District Number 3 schoolhouse still stands at number 12 Portland Street. It was the superintendent's office for several years. Its original architect was Francis H. Fassett.

Ammi Storer, the original owner of a business in the brick building at the corner of Main and Portland, lived at number 17. He built the house around 1867. Shoemaker Tristram Cleaves lived next to the schoolhouse at number 18, which was built in 1840.

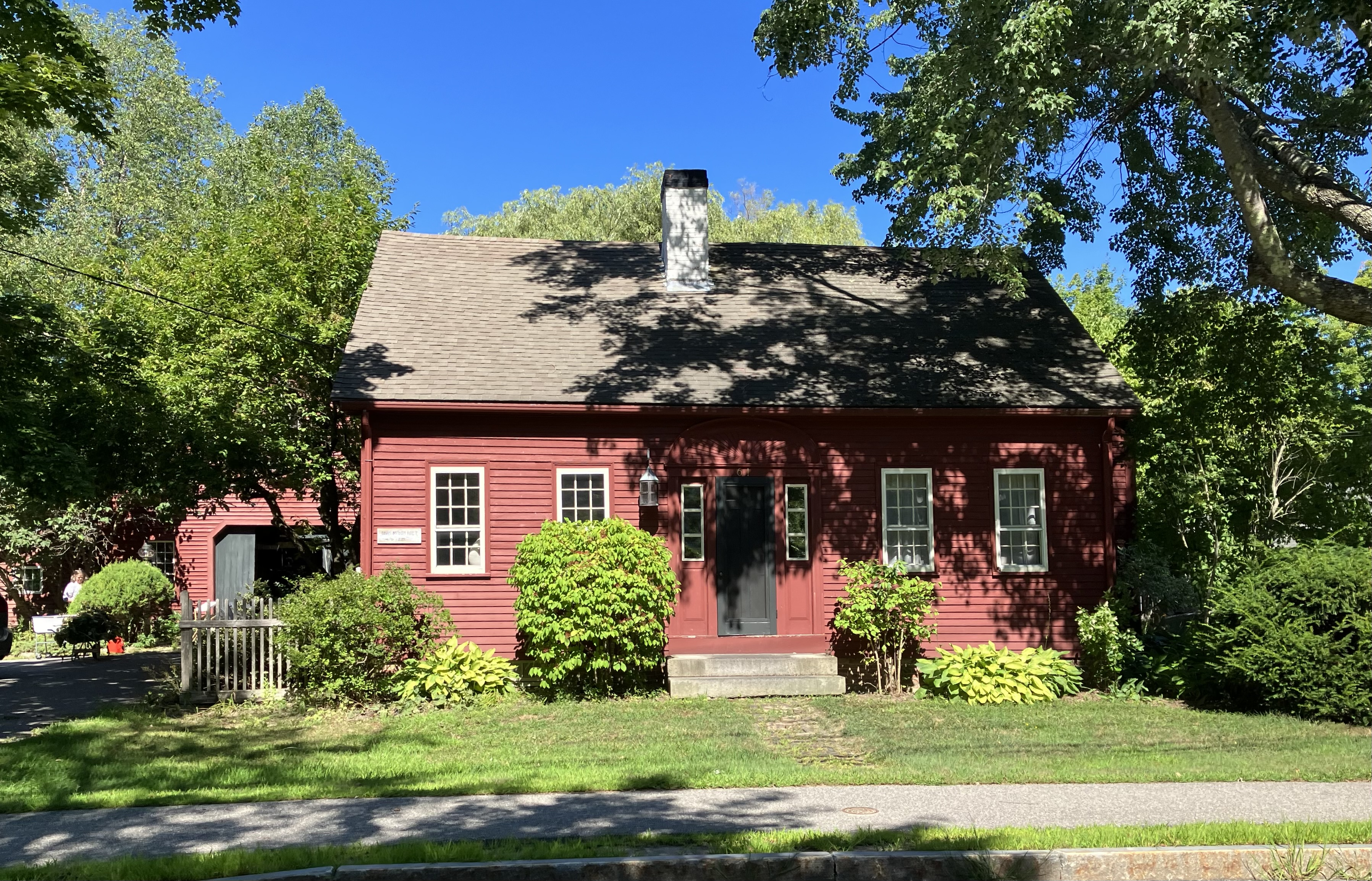
Davis Moxcey House, 61 Portland Street

In an 1875 photograph of the northern end of Portland Street, with the Universalist church in the background, Englishman Captain Henry Newton's house (number 34, built in 1856) is visible on the right. Dr. William Parsons and painter Gad Hitchcock Jr. (not to be confused with his father, Gad Hitchcock Sr., the town's doctor) previously lived there. Leon Gorman, the grandson of Leon Leonwood Bean, also lived here until his death at the age of 80. He was, at the time of his passing, the wealthiest person living in the state of Maine, having had a reported net worth of $860 million.

The original owner of number 23, which was constructed in 1850, William B. Newbegin, was a blacksmith.

Number 29, the circa-1849 Francis W. Seabury House, including its barn, is eligible for listing as an example of well-preserved Greek Revival design.

Reuben Cutter, a shoemaker and postmaster, was the original owner of number 37 around 1839.

Another blacksmith, Dexter Hale, was the original owner of number 47 in 1838.

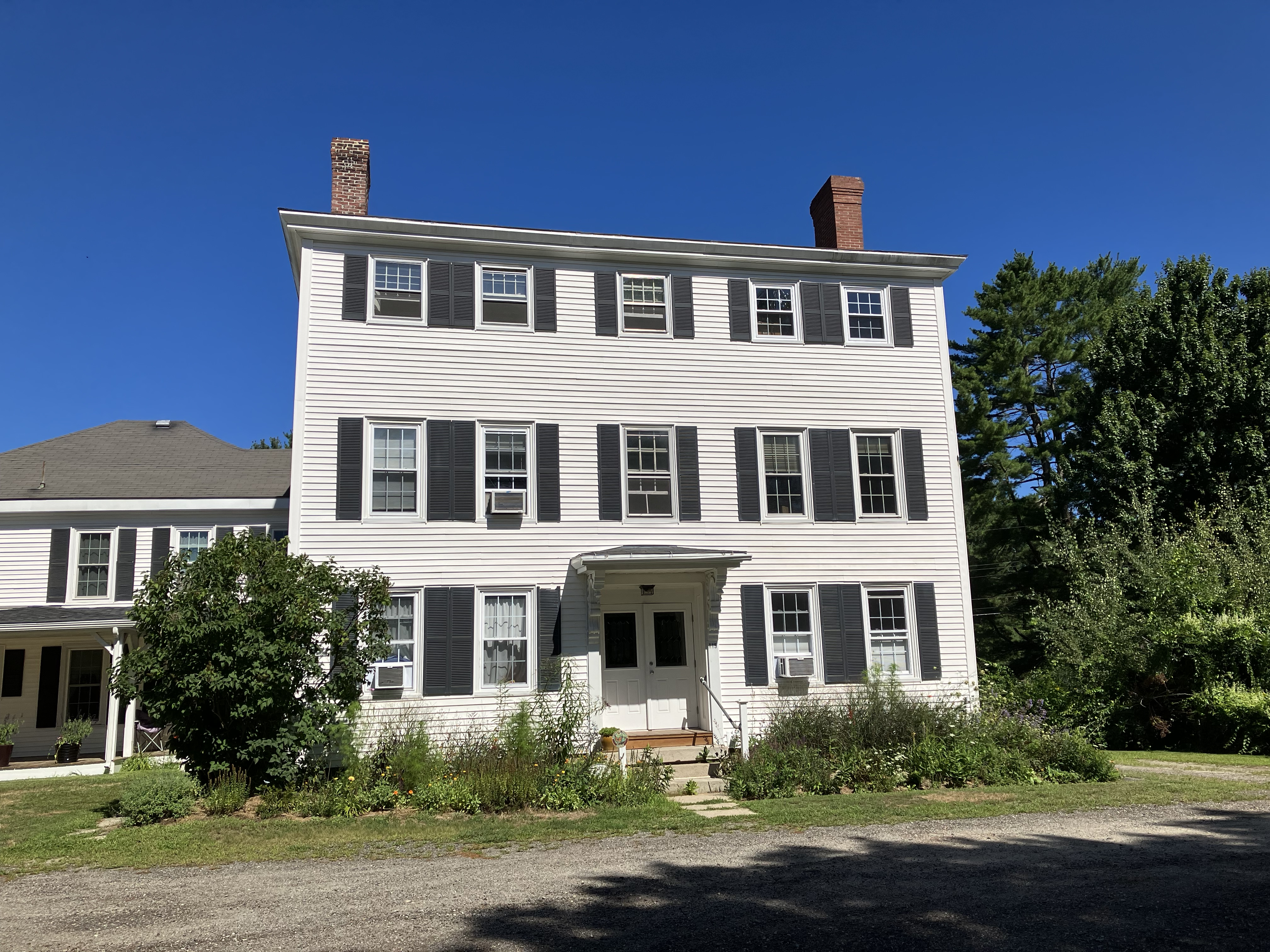
115 Portland Street, the former Old Tavern Farm

At number 61 (near the intersection with High Street), is the 1833 Federal-style cape that was owned by Davis Moxcey, a local shipwright in the early years of shipbuilding.

The Bethuel Wood House, at 104, dates to around 1830. It was moved from Main Street in 1940, when North Yarmouth Academy acquired the land.

Halfway along this northern section of Portland Street, at number 115, is a three-story Federal-style building that was once a tavern, built around 1810 by Colonel Seth Mitchell. It was later occupied by Deacon John Webster, in 1820, and Captain Eben Lane and his son-in-law Irving True. Lane ran it as a tavern from around 1857 until after 1871. After 1915, Ralph Redfern used the property for a dairy that became known as Old Tavern Farm. The property contained a large hall for dances. When the "west end" of town became Cumberland, "there was a great lawsuit about it, and the trial was held in that hall," remembered Revd. Joseph Stockbridge.

Number 159, the last house on the right before the gas station, is a cape with high-style Greek Revival details, including oval windows framed with garlands set in the cornice. It is eligible for listing "due to its architectural merit."

No buildings on the western portion of Portland Street have been found to be historically important.
