= Ebenezer D. Lane =

American sea Captain

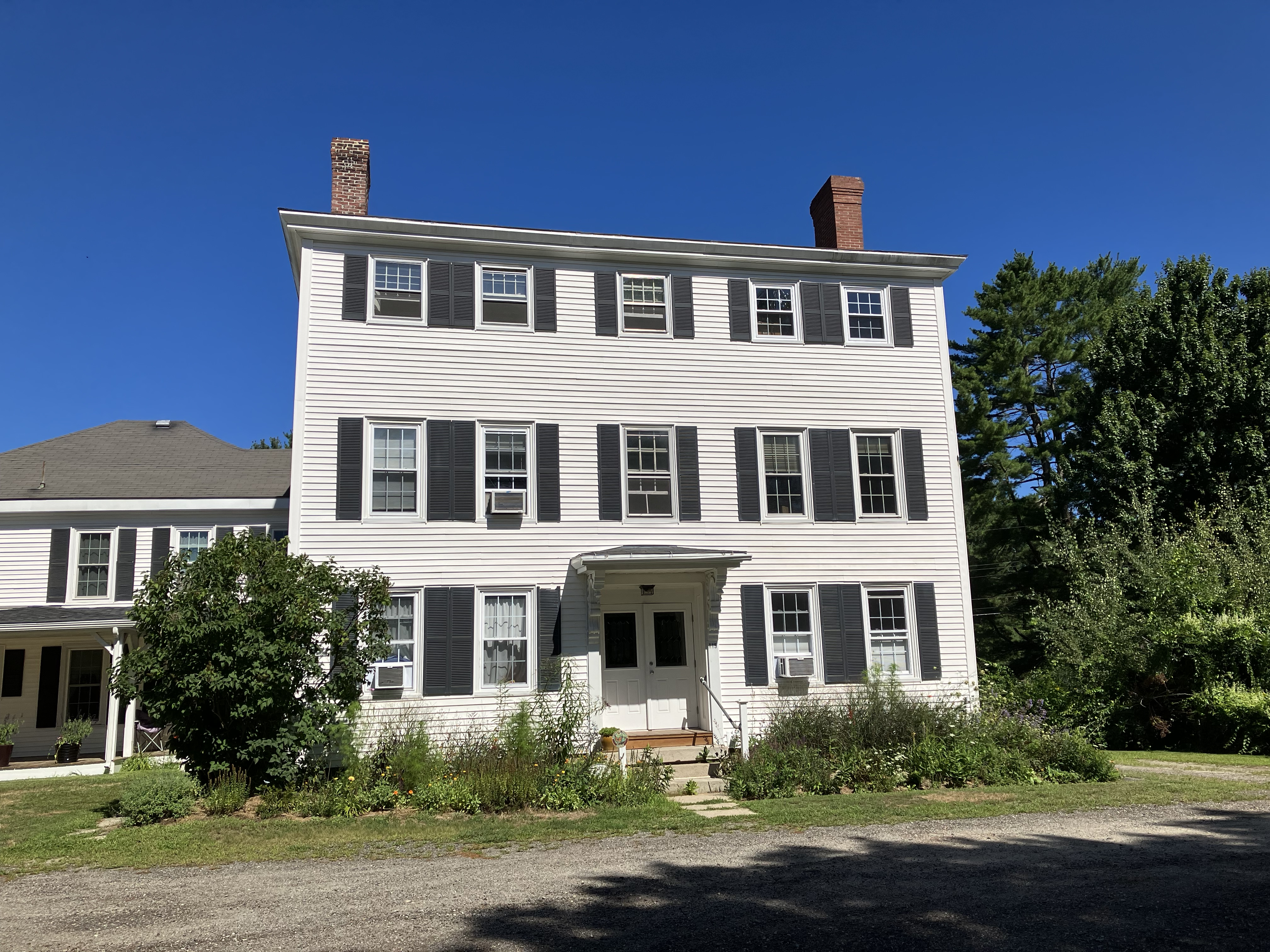
- Lane ran a tavern at today's 115 Portland Street in Yarmouth, Maine
- Born: February 2, 1814
- Died: May 9, 1879 (aged 65)
- Resting place: Old Baptist Cemetery, Yarmouth, Maine, U.S.
- Occupation: Sea captain
- Spouse: Sarah Jane Pratt (1842–1862; her death)

Captain Ebenezer D. Lane (February 2, 1814 – May 9, 1879) was an American sea captain. He was a captain, owner and agent of several vessels.

== Life and career ==
Lane was born in 1814 to Levi Lane, of New Gloucester, District of Maine, and Sarah Hicks, of North Yarmouth.

Lane married Sarah Jane Pratt on January 17, 1842. They had several children, including Leila Lanthia (born 1842), Samuel, Alfred, Sarah and Mary.

During his time as a ship master, he was a captain, owner and agent of several ships, including the Abbie C. Titcomb (schooner), Bertha (barque), Eureka (barque), S. R. Bearce (barque), Alice D. Cooper, Alice Vennard, Archimedes (barque), Gleaner (barque) and Hiero (barque). All of them, except the Alice D. Cooper, were built in the harbor of his hometown of Yarmouth, District of Maine.

In 1857, Lane purchased a tavern formerly located on Yarmouth's Portland Street. He ran it, with his son-in-law Irving True (1851–1940), until 1871. Irving was the husband of Lane's daughter, Mary.

By 1860, Lane was listed as a farmer, but was still believed to be active in the shipping business.

== Death ==
Lane died in 1879, aged 65. He is interred in Yarmouth's Old Baptist Cemetery beside his wife, who preceded him in death by 17 years.
