= Third Falls =

Waterfall in Yarmouth, Maine

- Baker Falls
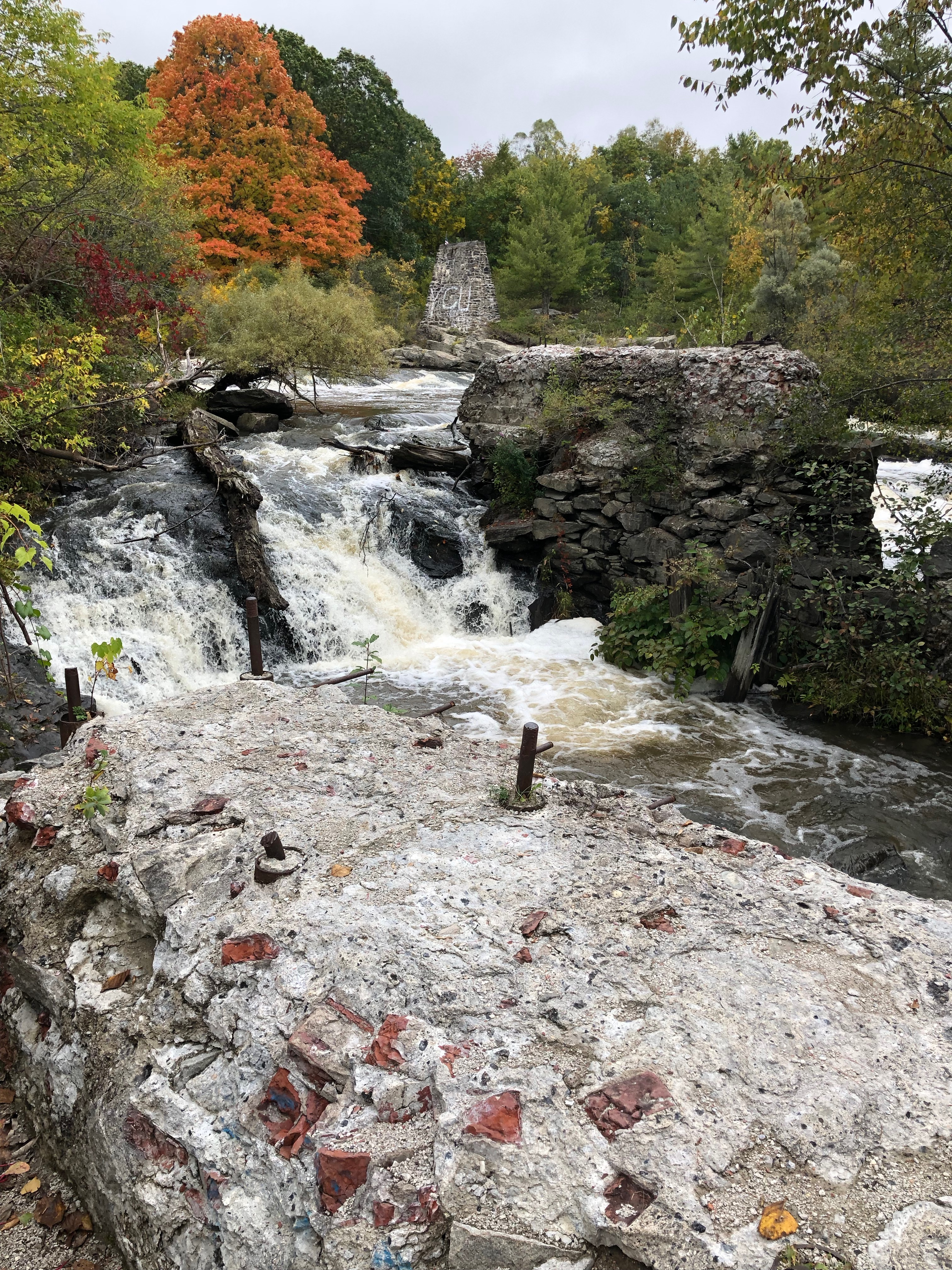
- The Royal River flowing between the remnants of the Forest Paper Company factory building, which was razed in the early 1970s. Viewed from Royal River Park
- Interactive map of Third Falls
- Location: Yarmouth, Maine, U.S.
- Coordinates: 43.8048733104°N 70.18817942°W
- Number of drops: 1
- Watercourse: Royal River

The Third Falls are the third of four waterfalls in Yarmouth, Maine, United States. They are located on the Royal River, approximately 2.8 miles (4.5 km) from its mouth with inner Casco Bay at Yarmouth Harbor, and approximately 0.4 miles (0.64 km) upstream of the Second Falls. The river appealed to settlers because its 45-foot rise in close proximity to navigable water each provided potential waterpower sites. As such, each of the four falls was used to power 57 mills between 1674 and the mid-20th century.

Also known as the Baker Falls, the Third Falls were, by far, the most industrious of the four.

== Mills at the Third Falls ==
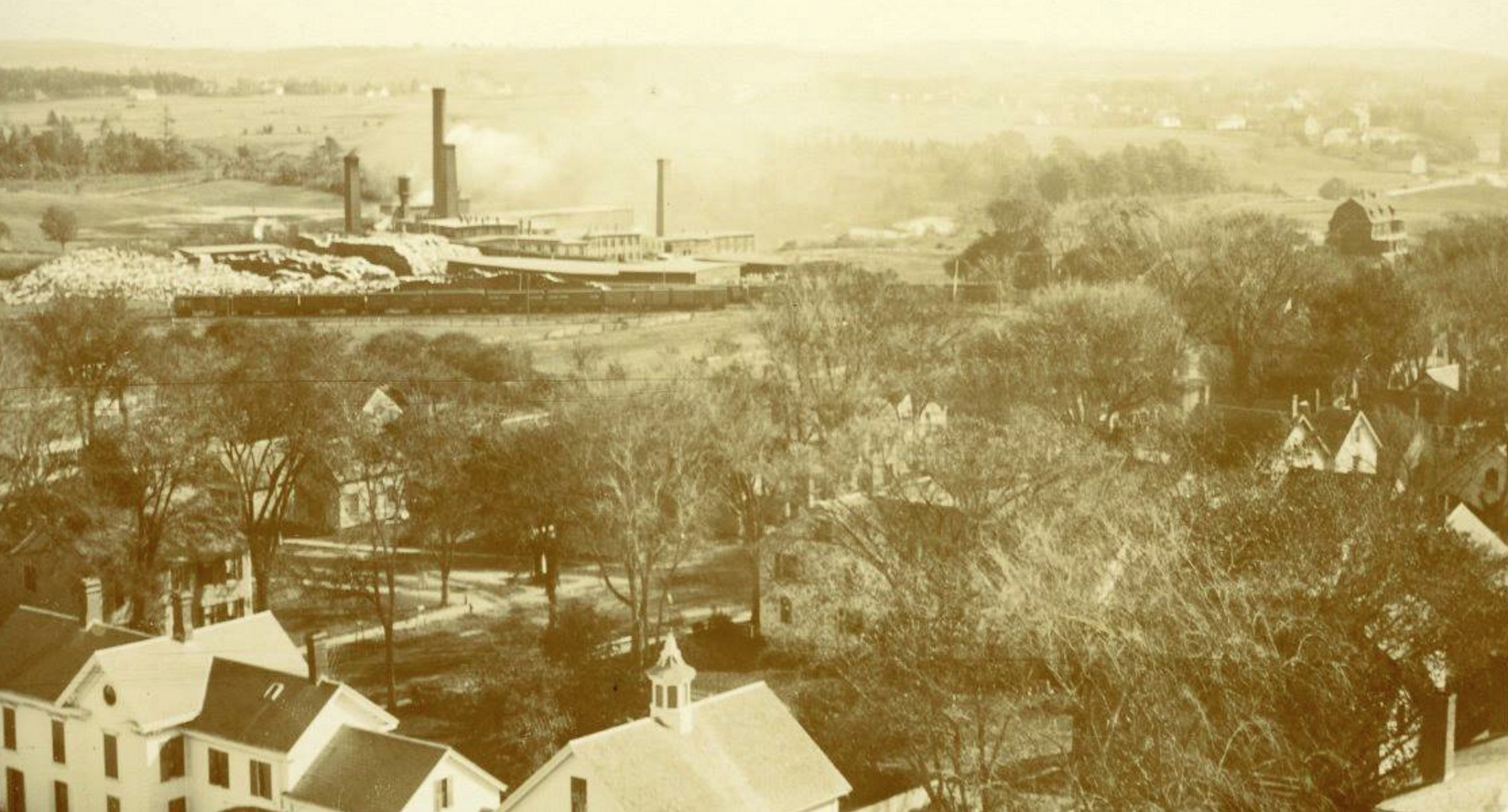
Forest Paper Company (left) and Camp Hammond (right), viewed from the top of the Meeting House on Hillside Street, looking east over Main Street's intersection with Elm Street

The first buildings — Jeremiah Baker's grist mill, a carding mill and a nail mill — were erected in 1805 between Bridge Street and East Elm Street on the eastern side of the river. On the western (or town) side of the river was a scythe and axe factory owned by Joseph C. Batchelder. Benjamin Gooch's fulling mill followed in 1830, but it later moved to the Fourth Falls.

The Yarmouth Paper Company, which produced paper pulp, was established in 1864, owned by C.D. Brown Paper Company. The main access road to it was an extended version of today's Mill Street, off Main Street. The original building burned in 1870. Two years later, a soda pulp mill was being run by H. M. Clark, Homer F. Locke and Henry Furbush, to which Samuel Dennis Warren and George W. Hammond bought the rights in 1874 and renamed it from Yarmouth Paper Company to the Forest Paper Company. Beginning with a single wooden building, the facility expanded to ten buildings covering as many acres, including a span over the river to Factory Island. Two bridges to it were also constructed. In 1909, it was the largest such mill in the world, employing 275 people. The mill used 15,000 cords (54,000 m^{3}) of poplar each year, which meant mounds of logs were constantly in view beside Mill Street. Six railroad spurs extended from the tracks running behind Main Street to the Forest Paper Company, traversing today's Royal River Park. Rail cars delivered logs, coal, soda and chlorine to the mill and carried pulp away. The mill closed in 1923, when import restrictions on pulp were lifted and Swedish pulp became a cheaper option. The mill burned in 1931, leaving charred remains on the site until the development of the park in the early 1980s. In 1971, the Marine Corps Reserve tore down the old factory, before a Navy demolition team used fourteen cases of dynamite to raze the remains. Most of the remaining debris was crushed and used as fill for the park, but several remnants of the building are still visible today.

== See also ==
- List of waterfalls
