= Camp Hammond (Yarmouth, Maine) =

Historic house in Maine, United States

- U.S. National Register of Historic Places
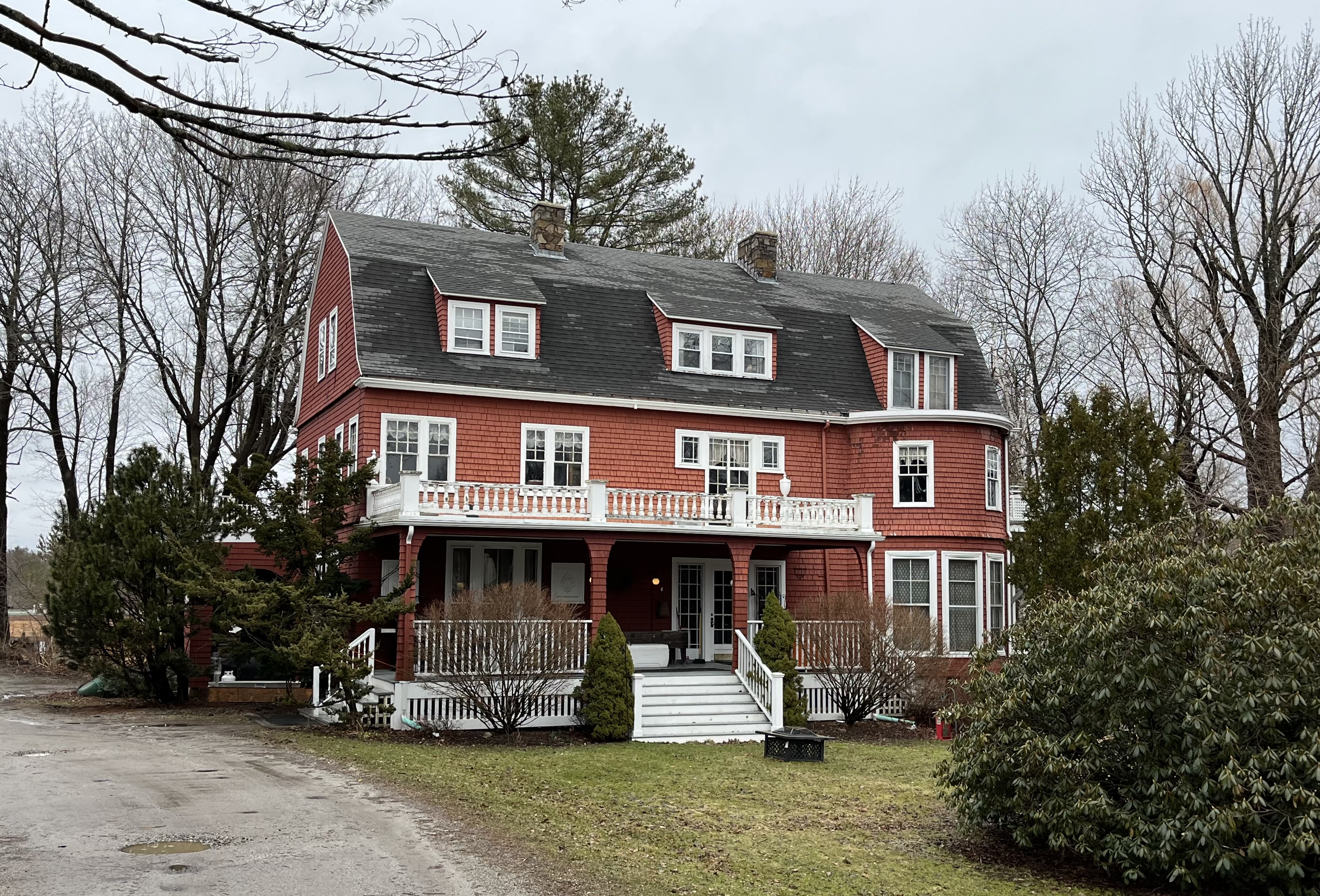
- Pictured in 2023

- Location within Maine Location within the United States
- Location: 74 Main St., Yarmouth, Maine
- Coordinates: 43°48′10″N 70°11′23″W
- Area: 1 acre (0.40 ha)
- Built: 1889 (137 years ago)
- Architect: George W. Hammond; Alexander Twombly
- Architectural style: Shingle Style
- NRHP reference No.: 79000137
- Added to NRHP: February 1, 1979

Camp Hammond is an historic house at 74 Main Street in Yarmouth, Maine. Built in 1889, this large Shingle style is notable for its method of construction, which used techniques more typically applied to industrial mill construction in a residential setting to minimize the spread of fire. George W. Hammond, one of its architects, was owner of the nearby Forest Paper Company. The house was listed on the National Register of Historic Places in 1979.

== Description and history ==
Camp Hammond is located off the north side of Main Street (Maine State Route 115) in Yarmouth's town center, between the Sacred Heart Catholic Church and the Rowe School. It is a large 2 1/2-story wood-frame structure, with a gambrel roof, shingled exterior, and fieldstone foundation. The roof has three shed-roof dormers, each with differing window shapes and configurations. The main facade, facing roughly south, is divided into three sections. The rightmost section is a rounded bay, with three large sash windows on the first level and two smaller ones on the second. The central section houses the main entrance, flanked by fixed multipane windows, and a three-part window on the second level. The left section houses a tall three-part window on the first floor, and two pairs of windows (mirror-image narrow and wide sash) on the second floor. A porch extends across the left two sections, with a balustrade above; it originally extended farther left to form a porte-cochère, but that has been removed.

Built as a summer property by George Hammond, the house is a well-preserved local example of the Shingle Style of architecture. It is more important, however, for its construction method, which is a rare example of a "mill-built" residence, using techniques more commonly found in mill buildings to retard the advance of fire. It is built with heavy timbers, and has no walls with open voids where fire might pass with little notice. These techniques are not unlike construction methods found in First Period colonial housing, with exterior planking and sheathing, and no interior plasterwork. The interior sides of the planking and woodwork were finished, providing the house's rooms with a certain grandeur. The house was documented in an architectural journal in 1891.

Olmsted Brothers, the sons and descendants of Frederick Law Olmsted, designed the gardens of the property.

== See also ==
- National Register of Historic Places listings in Cumberland County, Maine
- Historical buildings and structures of Yarmouth, Maine
