= Ammi Ruhamah Cutter (physician) =

American physician

- Cutter's silhouette portrait and signature
- Born: March 15, 1735; North Yarmouth, Province of Massachusetts Bay
- Died: December 8, 1820 (aged 85); Portsmouth, New Hampshire, U.S.
- Resting place: Old North Cemetery, Portsmouth, New Hampshire
- Occupation: Physician

Ammi Ruhamah Cutter (March 15, 1735 – December 8, 1820) was an American physician. He served as a surgeon during the French and Indian War of 1754–1763, and was also the Physician General of the medical department of the Continental Army during the American Revolutionary War of 1775–1783.

== Early life ==
Cutter was born in 1735, in North Yarmouth, Province of Massachusetts Bay (now Yarmouth, Maine), the son of Ammi Ruhamah Cutter Sr. and Dorothy Bradbury. His father was the first pastor of Yarmouth's First Parish Congregational Church, established at the Old Ledge Meetinghouse in November 1730. He and his family lived at the parsonage at today's 60 Gilman Road, around twenty yards to the east of where the church formerly stood, which was garrisoned during the Indian wars.

In 1747, he was sent to be educated by a clergyman in Cambridge, Province of Massachusetts Bay. He made the 150-mile (240 km) ride on horseback through "thick wilderness", enduring several "hair-breath 'scapes" (likely with Indians) on the way.

He graduated from Harvard College in 1752, 27 years after his father. One of his classmates was Sir John Wentworth, 1st Baronet, who became governor of the Province of New Hampshire. They later reacquainted in Halifax, Nova Scotia, where Wentworth was governor.

== Career ==
Cutter studied medicine under the tuition of Dr. Clement Jackson, of Portsmouth, Province of New Hampshire. His admission was swift, for he was appointed surgeon of a body of rangers, under British Army officer Robert Rogers, who formed part of the army on the frontiers in the Indian war in 1755. He was later stationed at Fort Edward in New York.

After his marriage in 1758, Cutter "immediately entered upon the sober duties of life". The following year, Robert Rogers tried to convince him to resume his station in the service, but he politely declined. Between this point and the onset of the American Revolutionary War, Cutter lived a simple life, and began to grow his family.

It was voted, in March 1770, that the mill stream and privilege on Smith River in Wolfeboro, New Hampshire, be forfeited and reverted to Cutter and David Sewall. The privilege was to forever remain, on the condition that they have "a good grist-mill" built and maintained in good order and repair.

In 1777, the Second Continental Congress opted to reorganize the medical department, and Cutter was called upon. He was offered the role of Physician General of the eastern department, with his station being Fishkill, New York, on the North River. He remained in the role for a year, at which point "the circumstances of his family compelled him to resign his office". This included the death of his eldest son, a promising youth at college. Returning to his profession and his pleasing task of educating his children, he was a domestic man. "He sought no higher enjoyments than he could find at his own parlor fireside; that was the scene of his pleasures and the centre of his hopes."

Around 1794, Cutter formed a partnership practice with his third son, William.

== Personal life ==
Cutter married Hannah Treadwell (1735–1832) on November 2, 1758. On December 18, 1758, after receiving news of the marriage, his mother, Dorothy Cutter, now a widow of twelve years, wrote to him:

Dear son,

Your letter informs me you are married. This I hope will be a means of settling you in the world, and making you steady. Set up the worship of God in your family; and as he has been heaping many favors upon you, make a wise improvement of them, and in some measure live agreeable thereto.

I hope to see you and your wife here soon as the season will admit.

The couple had ten known children between 1759 and 1776. Their eldest son, Charles, drowned on October 22, 1779, in Fresh Pond in Cambridge, Massachusetts. He was 16. He is buried in the Old Burying Ground, near Harvard Square in Cambridge. His headstone epitaph is carved in Latin.

Cutter was, for many years, the president of the New Hampshire Medical Society.

He received an honorary degree of M.D. from Harvard College, and was chosen an honorary member of the Massachusetts Medical Society and Massachusetts Humane Society.

== Death ==
Cutter died in 1820, in Portsmouth, New Hampshire. He was 85. He is buried in the city's Old North Cemetery with his wife, who survived him by twelve years.
