= Stephen Larrabee =

- Born: 1630
- Died: 1676 (aged 45 or 46); Jewell Island, Massachusetts Bay Colony

Stephen Larrabee (1630–1676) was a 17th-century French emigrant to the New England Colonies. Larrabee's Landing, in today's Yarmouth, Maine, is named for him. He was one of the first settlers in the town.

== Arrival in the Thirteen Colonies ==
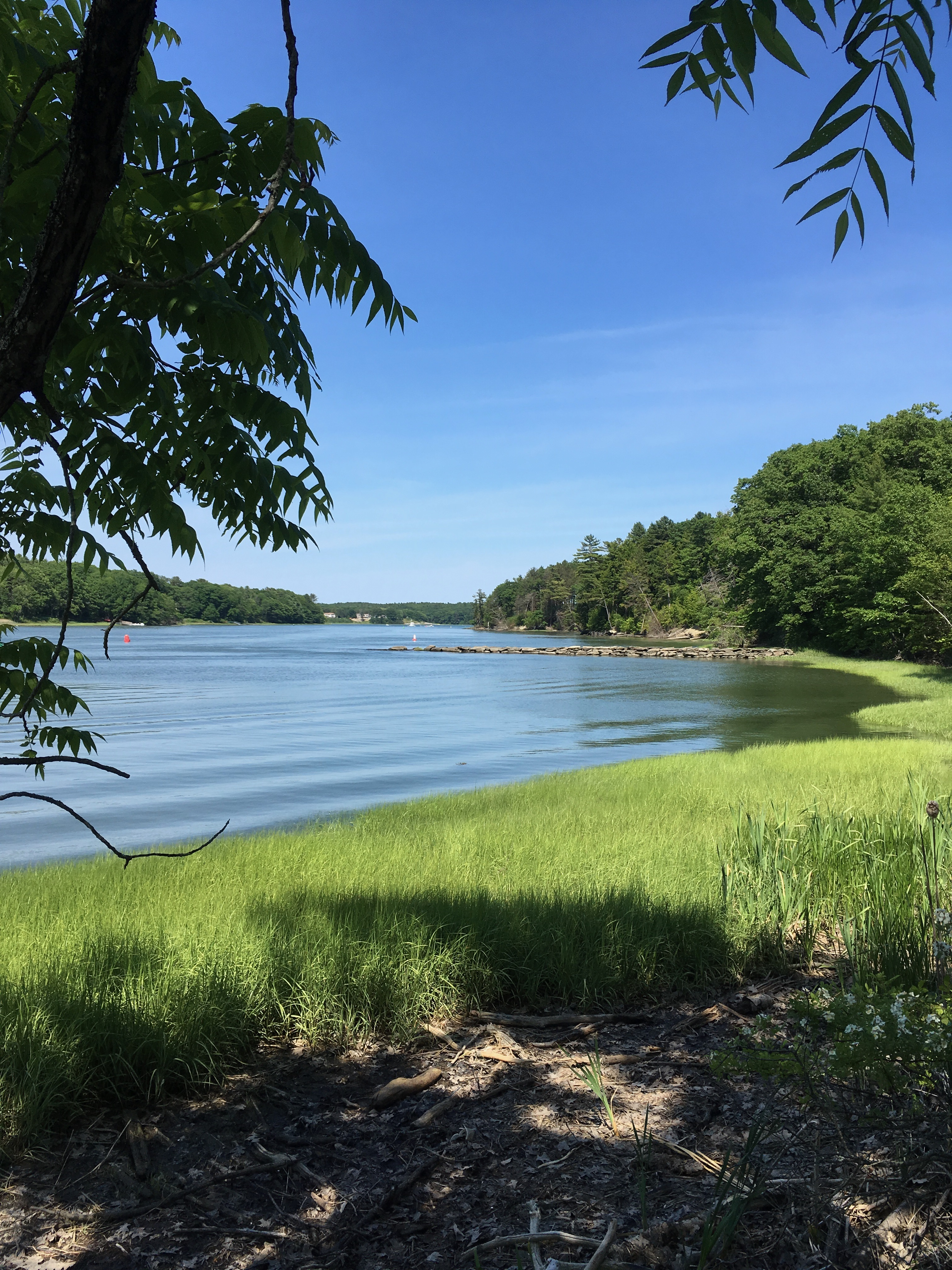
Larrabee's Landing, looking downstream along the Royal River

After living initially in Malden, Massachusetts Bay Colony, with his brother, William, he moved north to North Yarmouth. He made the trip without William, who remained in Malden, shortly after marrying Elizabeth Felt, daughter of George Felt.

=== Larrabee's Landing ===
The Meetinghouse under the Ledge was built from material floated down the Royal River from the First Falls and hauled up by oxen from Larrabee's Landing, further down Gilman Road, towards Cousins Island.

== Personal life ==
Stephen Larrabee had the following known children: Stephen, William, John, Thomas, Samuel, Isaac, Benjamin, Ephraim and Jane.

Larrabee was a soldier in the Narragansett War (also known as King Philip's War), as was his grandson (son of William), Stephen, who became a noted Indian fighter.

== Death ==
Larrabee was killed by Native Americans on Jewell Island in Casco Bay in 1676.
