= Ammi Ruhamah Cutter =

Ammi Ruhamah Cutter may refer to:

- Ammi Ruhamah Cutter (minister)
- Ammi Ruhamah Cutter (physician)
