= Nicholas Loring =

American minister

The Reverend Nicholas Loring
- Born: September 1, 1711; Hull, Province of Massachusetts Bay
- Died: July 31, 1763 (aged 51); North Yarmouth, Province of Massachusetts Bay
- Resting place: Ledge Cemetery, Yarmouth, Maine, U.S.
- Occupation: Minister

Nicholas Loring (September 1, 1711 – July 31, 1763) was an American Congregational minister who served as the second pastor of the "Old Ledge" meetinghouse in what was then North Yarmouth, Province of Massachusetts Bay (now Yarmouth, Maine). He died while in the 28th year of his tenure.

== Early life ==
Loring was born in 1711, the son of John Loring and June Baker. His father died eight years after Nicholas' birth, aged 38.

He graduated from Harvard College in 1732.

== Career ==
In 1736, Loring was ordained the second pastor of the new Meetinghouse under the Ledge, in what was then North Yarmouth, Province of Massachusetts Bay (now Yarmouth, Maine). He succeeded Ammi Ruhamah Cutter, who was relieved of his duties due to his liberal theology.

== Personal life ==
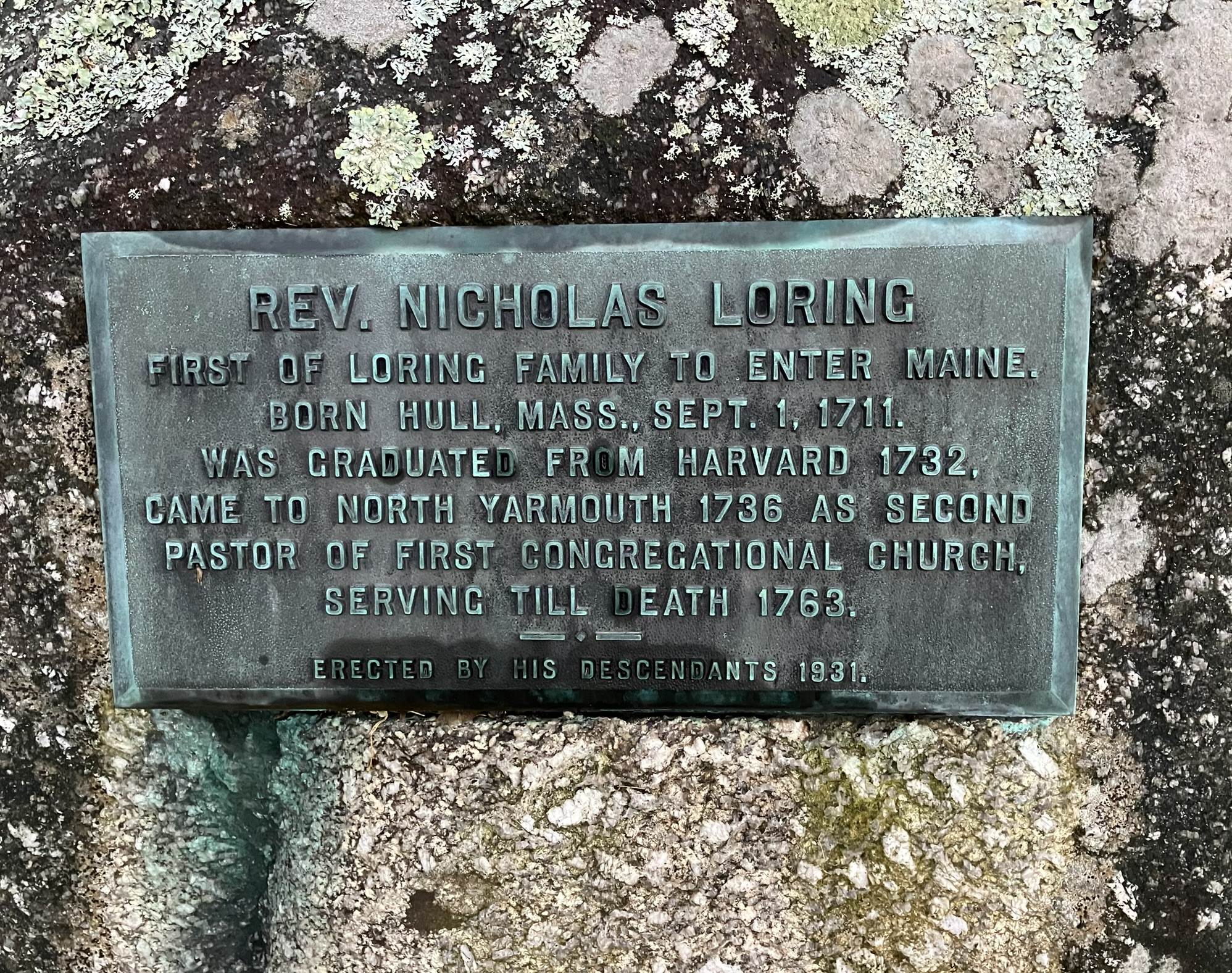
Loring's headstone at the Ledge Cemetery

Loring married Mary Richmond (1713–1803) on February 16, 1737, in Little Compton, Colony of Rhode Island and Providence Plantations. The daughter of colonel Silvester Richmond, Mary received a female house servant as part of her wedding gift. The slave, Belinda, was part of Mary's will.

The Lorings had ten children: Richmond, Bezaleel, Levi, Lucretia (the mother of physician Ammi Ruhamah Mitchell), Mary, Elizabeth, Rachel, Thomas, Nicholas and Jeremiah. Thomas, Levi and Jeremiah purchased land and built homes in the Walnut Hill area of North Yarmouth, becoming some of the earliest settlers.

== Death ==
Loring died in 1763, aged 51. He is interred in the Ledge Cemetery, a few yards from where his church formerly stood. He would have been one of the first burials there after burials were moved from the nearby Pioneer Cemetery in 1770. His wife survived him by fifty years; she died in 1803, aged 89.

Loring was succeeded at the Old Ledge Meetinghouse by Rev. Edward Brooks.
