= James Parker (innkeeper) =

American innkeeper

- Born: March 24, 1687; Groton, Massachusetts Bay Colony
- Died: February 4, 1732 (aged 44); North Yarmouth, Province of Massachusetts
- Resting place: Pioneer Cemetery, Yarmouth, Maine, U.S.
- Occupation: Innkeeper
- Known for: Early settler, innkeeper, and judge
- Spouse: Sarah Ireson (1714–1732; his death)

James Parker (March 24, 1687 – February 4, 1732) was an American innkeeper and figure of the American Indian Wars. He was the first inn owner in what was then North Yarmouth, Province of Massachusetts (now Yarmouth, Maine). The town's Parker Point, off Gilman Road, is now named for him.

His home became a garrison, set up to protect against Native Indian attacks.

== Early life ==
Parker was born in 1687 in Groton, Massachusetts Bay Colony, to James Parker Sr. and Mary Parker. His parents were killed in the Groton Massacre of 1694, leaving James an orphan at the age of seven. His brother, Phinehas, was taken hostage for four years, before a ransom was met for his release.

He moved north to North Yarmouth, Province of Massachusetts, in 1719, becoming one of the early members of its third and final resettlement after the Second Indian War. In 1727, he was one of five men tasked in 1727 with the management of the new town. Their affairs included laying out the highways. He was also the town's first innkeeper.

== Personal life ==
In 1714, Parker married Sarah Ireson of Lynn, Province of Massachusetts. One of their children, daughter Esther, married Benaiah Bradbury. Another daughter, Elizabeth, married George Drinkwater.

Parker established the first inn in North Yarmouth. Incorporating a tavern, it was in business by 1722.

== Death ==
Parker died in 1732, aged 44. He was one of the first interments in Yarmouth's Pioneer Cemetery. His headstone erroneously states his age at death as 42. His widow remarried, to Benjamin Ingersoll, in 1733.

=== Legacy ===
Yarmouth's Parker Point (formerly Mann's Point) is named for him.
