= Ledge Cemetery =

Cemetery in Yarmouth, Maine

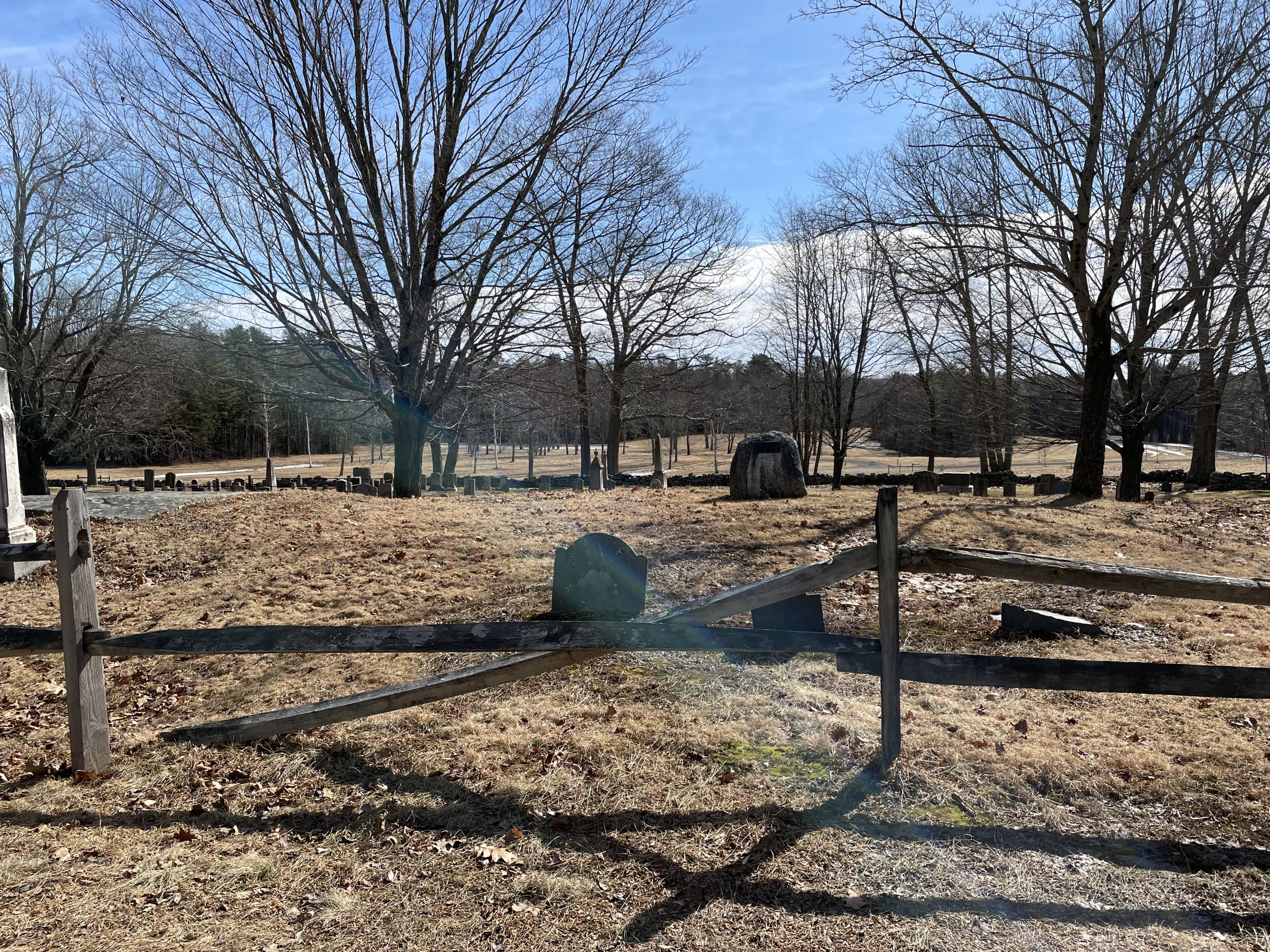
- The cemetery in 2022
- Interactive map of Ledge Cemetery

Details
- Established: 1770 (256 years ago)
- Location: Gilman Road; Yarmouth, Maine
- Country: United States
- Coordinates: 43.7847°N 70.1757°W
- Owned by: Town of Yarmouth
- Size: 2.5 acres (1.0 ha)
- No. of interments: 500+
- Find a Grave: Ledge Cemetery

Ledge Cemetery, also known as the Cemetery under the Ledge, is a historic cemetery in Yarmouth, Maine, United States. Dating to 1770, it stands on Gilman Road, around 450 feet (140 m) southwest of the older and smaller Pioneer Cemetery. It contains over 500 burials. Some headstones bear dates earlier than 1770, for many burials—such as that of Revd. Nicholas Loring—were removed from the older cemetery.

The original First Parish Congregational Church, known as the Old Ledge Meetinghouse, stood near the site between 1730 and 1818. Its first pastor was Reverend Ammi Ruhamah Cutter. Tristram Gilman, for whom Gilman Road is named, was the fourth pastor. He served in the role for forty years, and was buried in the Ledge Cemetery upon his death in 1809, aged 73. His wife, Elizabeth Sayer, is buried beside him.

Several sea captains are also interred here, including those from the Drinkwater family. Captain Theophilus Drinkwater, son of Allen and Hannah Drinkwater, gave his name to nearby Drinkwater Point Road.

Of a settlement that originally contained a school, a tavern and a cemetery, only the cemetery and the ledge doorstep of the church remain.

== Notable burials ==
- Ammi Ruhamah Cutter (1705–1746), first pastor of the Old Ledge Meetinghouse
- Captain Theophilus Drinkwater (1792–1872), namesake of Drinkwater Point Road
- Tristram Gilman (1735–1809), fourth pastor of the church that formerly stood on the site, namesake of Gilman Road
- Frances Elliott Mann Hall (1853–1935), founder of Sigma Kappa sorority
- Giles Loring (1813–1893), shipwright
- Reverend Nicholas Loring (1711–1763), second pastor of the Old Ledge Meetinghouse; died in the role
- Jacob Mitchell (1696–1784), deacon
- Honorable Jeremiah Powell (1720–1784), in the now-unmarked Powell tomb behind that of deacon Jacob Mitchell
- Captain Cushing Prince Jr. (1786–1869), sea captain
- Captain Reuben Prince (1792–1870), sea captain

== Gallery ==
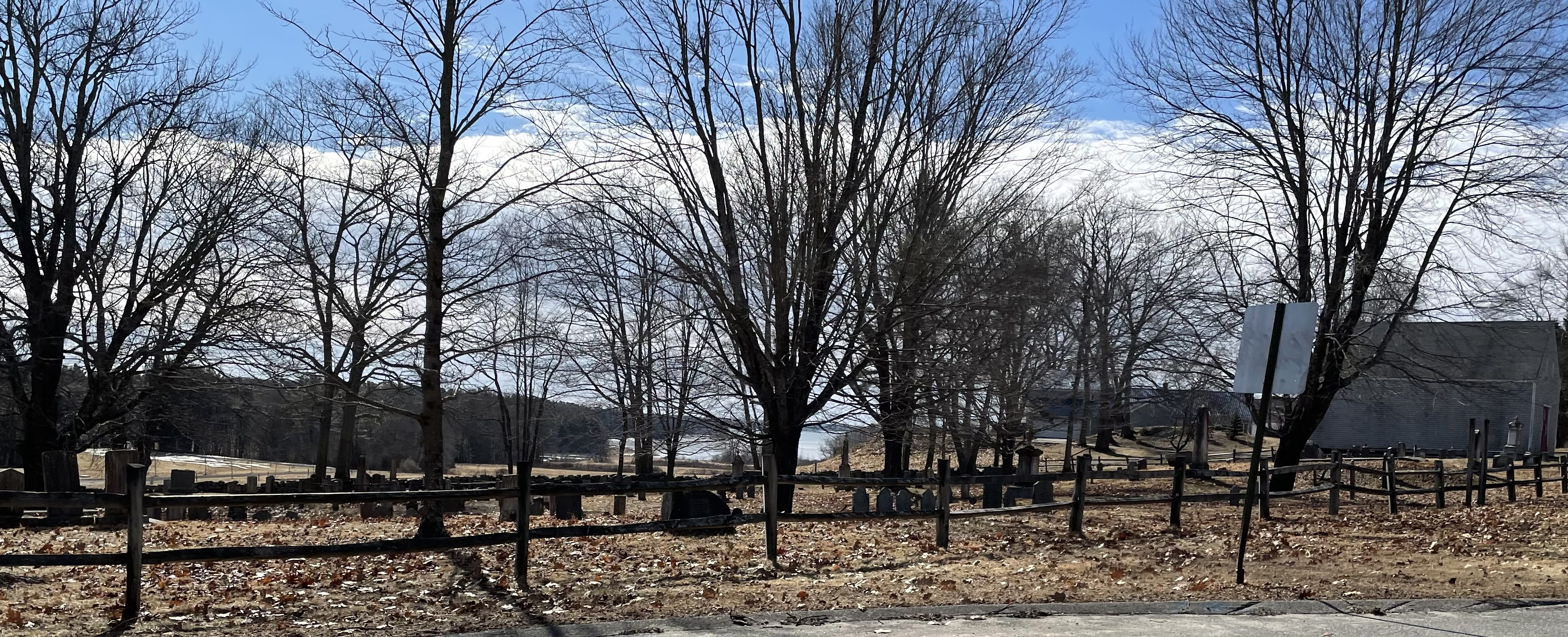
Looking southwest across the cemetery toward the northern tip of Broad Cove

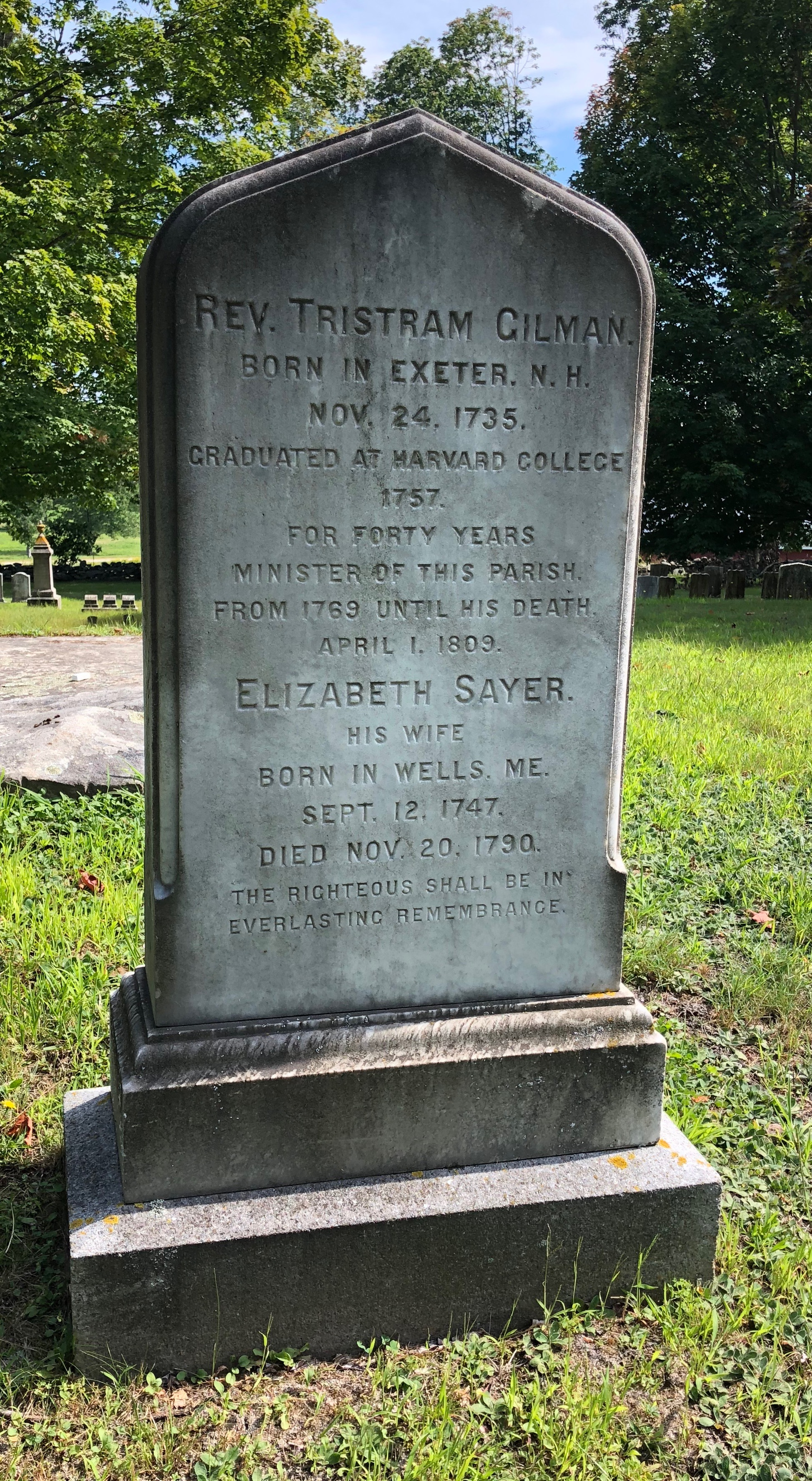
The headstone of Tristram Gilman, the fourth pastor of the former Meetinghouse under the Ledge

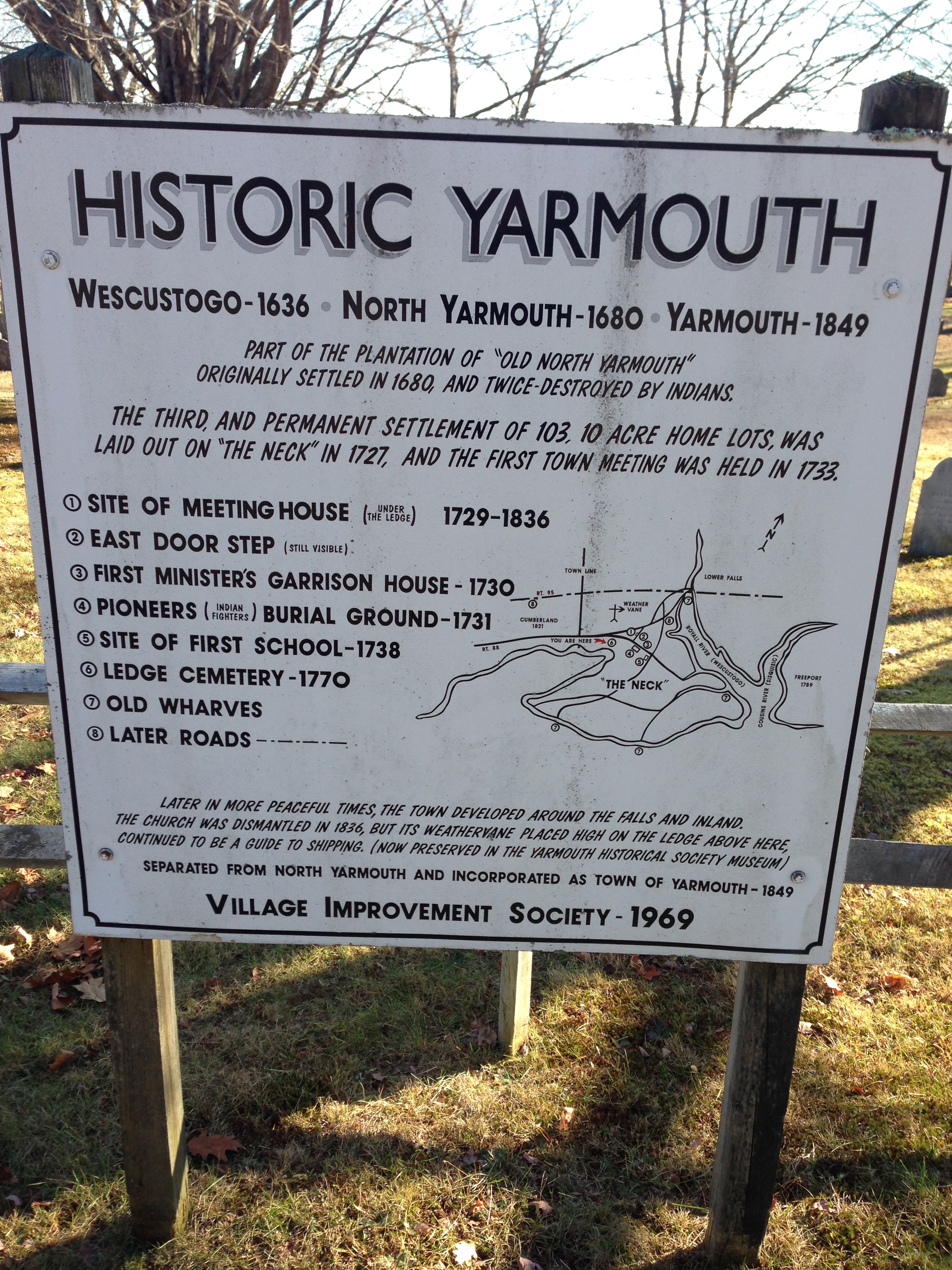
An information board marking sites of interest in and around the two cemeteries
