= Gilman Manse =

Historic house in Maine, United States

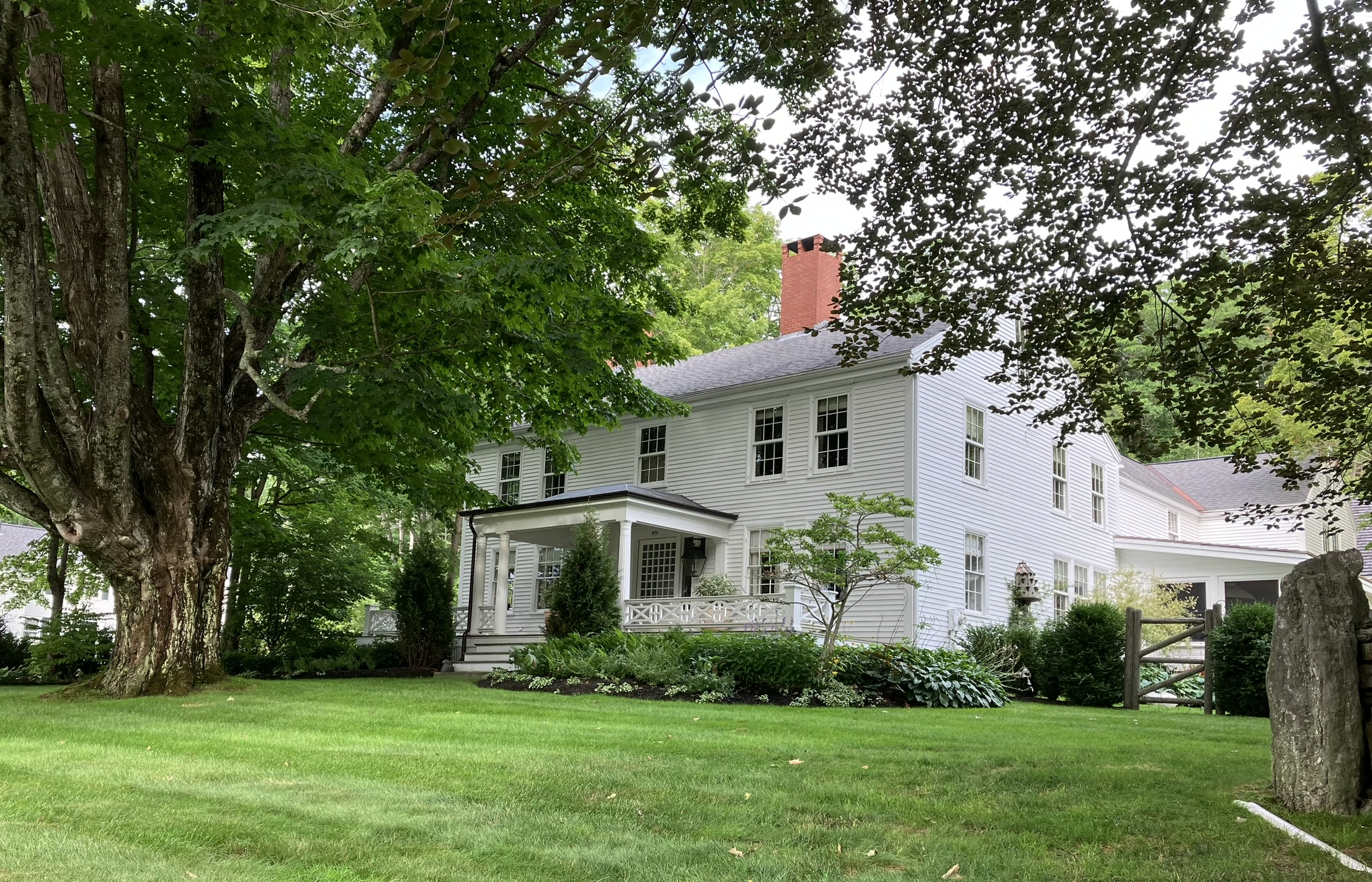
- The building in 2022
- Interactive map of the Gilman Manse area

General information
- Location: Yarmouth, Maine, U.S., 463 Lafayette Street
- Coordinates: 43.7840816°N 70.177725°W
- Completed: 1771 (255 years ago)

Technical details
- Floor count: 2.5

The Gilman Manse is an historic home at 463 Lafayette Street in Yarmouth, Maine. Built in 1771, making it one of the oldest extant buildings in the town, it was originally the home of Tristram Gilman, the fourth minister of the now-demolished Meetinghouse under the Ledge, which stood around 900 feet (270 m) to the northeast between 1729 and 1836. It succeeded the Cutter House, at 60 Gilman Road, as the parsonage for the church.

In 1905, John Calvin Stevens was hired to undertake a renovation of the property.

It was the home of Arthur E. Marks (1853–1917) in 1911, and of Merrill and Grace Haskell (1892–1971) from 1928.

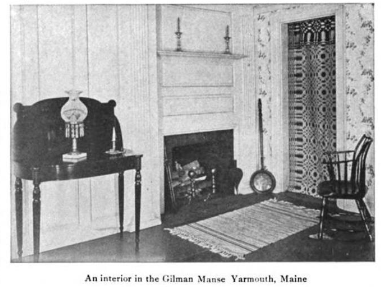
One of the home's fireplaces is in view in this circa-1912 photograph

== See also ==
- Historical buildings and structures of Yarmouth, Maine
