= Giles Loring =

- Loring pictured around 1890
- Born: March 26, 1813; Pownal, Massachusetts, U.S.
- Died: October 25, 1893 (aged 80); North Yarmouth, Maine, U.S.
- Resting place: Ledge Cemetery, Yarmouth, Maine, U.S.
- Occupation: Shipwright
- Known for: Shipbuilding
- Spouse(s): Sarah Mitchell Stubbs (1834–1885; her death); Lydia Hannah Schofield (1887–1893; his death)

Giles Loring (March 26, 1813 – October 2, 1893) was an American shipwright during a prolific period at Yarmouth Harbor in Maine. His shipyard was one of the four major ones during the town's peak years of 1850–1875, and it launched the harbor's final vessel.

== Early life ==
Loring was born on March 26, 1813, in Pownal, Massachusetts (now in Maine).

== Career ==
Established in 1854, the Giles Loring Shipyard became one of the four major shipyards at the harbor of Yarmouth during its time in the industry. Loring's yard was on the eastern side of the Royal River, and it was there that he built 34 ships, mostly brigs and barques, with an average size of around 400 gross tons. The largest vessel he built was the 989-ton Alice Vennard, launched in 1860. It was from his yard that the last major vessel, the three-mast schooner Damietta and Joanna, was launched in 1890. He sometimes built in tandem with Charles Poole (his son-in-law), John M. Cobb or Benjamin Chadsey.

== Personal life ==
Loring married twice: first to Sarah Mitchell Stubbs from 1834 until her death 1885, then Lydia Hannah Schofield, of Rochdale, England, from 1887 to his death in 1893.

After retiring in 1890, he went bankrupt after his investment in a mineral spring in North Yarmouth failed.

== Death ==
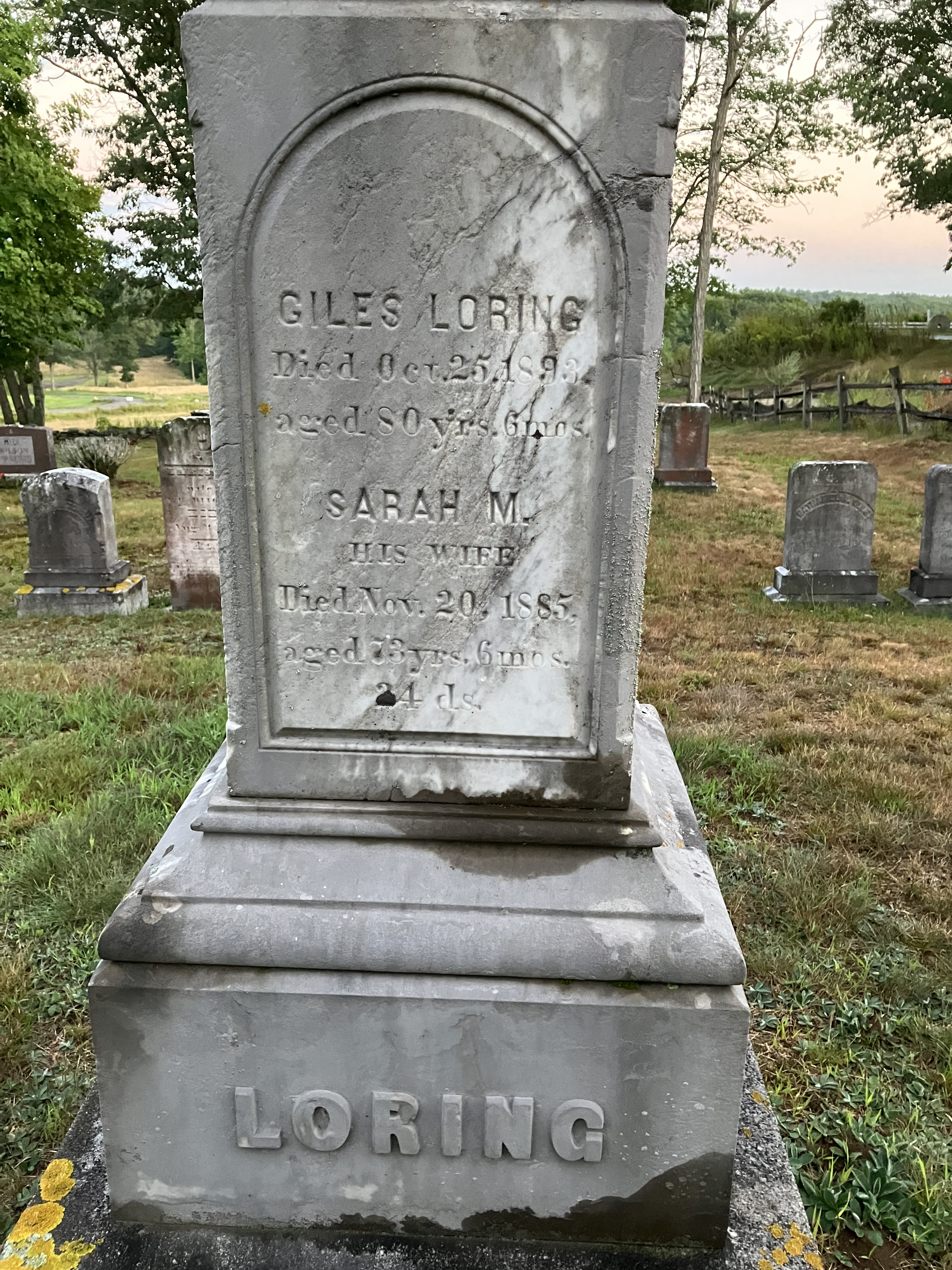
Loring’s headstone in the Ledge Cemetery

Loring died on October 25, 1893, aged 80. He is interred in Yarmouth's Ledge Cemetery. Although Loring was her second husband, and she married twice more after his death, Lydia was buried with him at the Ledge Cemetery upon her death in 1922.
