= Joseph Weare =

Massachusetts Bay settler

- Born: March 9, 1737
- Died: 1774 (aged 36 or 37)
- Resting place: Pioneer Cemetery, Yarmouth, Maine, U.S.
- Spouse: Mary Noyes (1760–1774; his death)

Joseph Weare (March 9, 1737 – 1774) was an 18th-century fighter of Native Americans. He was from North Yarmouth, Province of Massachusetts Bay, and was nicknamed the Scout.

== Life and career ==
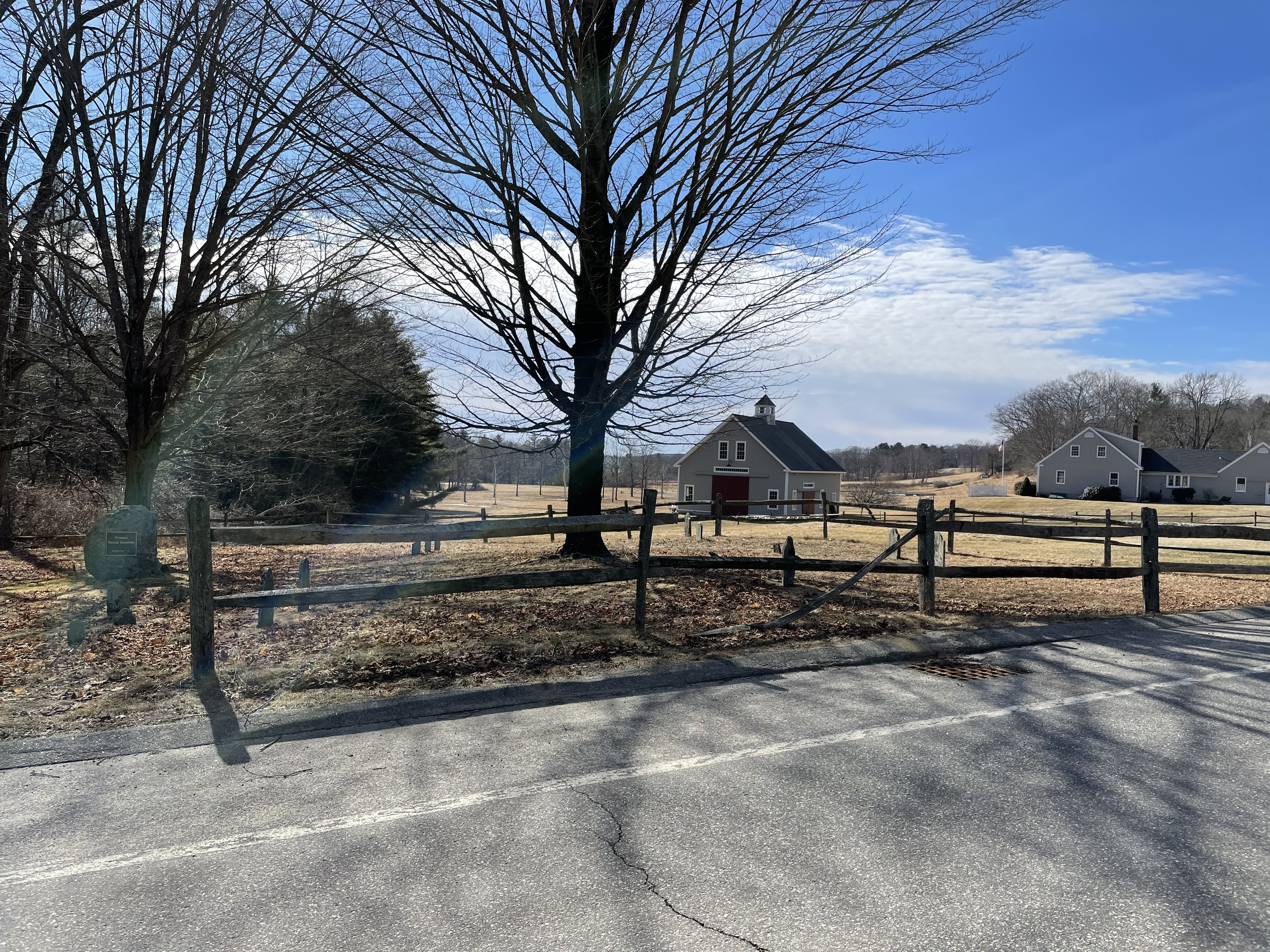
Yarmouth's Indian Fighters' Cemetery, in which Weare is interred

Weare was born to Captain Peter Weare (1695–1743) and Sarah Felt (1701–1768). His father drowned while attempting to cross the Royal River in North Yarmouth, Province of Massachusetts Bay, when Joseph was six years old; his mother lived for a further twenty-five years.

Weare's hostility to the Native Americans (whom he "pursued at every opportunity with unrelenting hate") began when he learned that they killed his maternal grandfather, Joseph Felt, in 1722.

He married Mary Noyes on March 20, 1760. They had one known child, Nathaniel, born that December, who was named for Joseph's paternal grandfather.

Around 1760, Weare was splitting logs with an axe near his home when six Indians approached. They asked him if he know where "Joe Weare" lived. He responded that he did, and offered to lead them to him if they helped him finish his work. He asked the Indians to pull on each side of the log as he drove his axe into the wedge. With three of them on each side of the log, Weare drove his axe into the wedge, causing it to close on the Indians' hands, rendering them defenseless. He then hit each of them with his axe, shouting, "I'm Joe Weare, damn you; I'm Joe Weare!"

== Death ==
Weare died, while in Boston, in 1774, likely during the early stages of King George's War. He was 36 or 37. He was buried in the Pioneer Cemetery (also known as the Indian Fighters' Cemetery) in today's Yarmouth, Maine. His wife later remarried, to Humphrey Merrill of Falmouth.
