= Edward Brooks (minister) =

American minister

The Reverend Edward Brooks
- Born: October 31, 1733; Medford, Province of Massachusetts Bay
- Died: May 6, 1781 (aged 47); Medford, Massachusetts, U.S.
- Resting place: Oak Grove Cemetery, Medford, Massachusetts
- Occupation: Minister

Edward Brooks (October 31, 1733 – May 6, 1781) was an American Congregational minister who served as the third pastor of the "Old Ledge" meetinghouse in what was then North Yarmouth, Province of Massachusetts Bay (now Yarmouth, Maine).

== Early life ==
Brooks was born in Medford, Province of Massachusetts Bay, to Samuel Brooks and Mary Boutwell.

He graduated Harvard College in 1757, before working as the college's librarian between 1758 and 1760.

== Career ==
On July 4, 1764, Brooks was ordained as the minister of the Meetinghouse under the Ledge in what was then North Yarmouth, Province of Massachusetts Bay. He succeeded Nicholas Loring, who died in the role in 1763.

Around three years into his stint in North Yarmouth, "theological differences" between Brooks and his congregation began to surface. Attempts were made to align their beliefs, but it proved unsuccessful, and Brooks was dismissed in March 1769. Nine months later, he was succeeded by thirty-five-year-old Province of New Hampshire native Tristram Gilman.

Brooks returned to Medford, and purchased land on Grove Street as he moved into farming. He preached occasionally at the First Parish Church.

== Personal life ==
Brooks married Abigail Brown on September 23, 1764, two months into his ministerial role in North Yarmouth.

A Son of Liberty, Peter Chardon Brooks documented his father's exploits during the American Revolutionary War: He went to Lexington "on horseback, with his gun on his shoulder and in his full-bottomed wig."

Brooks also served as a chaplain in the Continental Navy, including aboard the Hancock. The Hancock was captured by the Royal Navy in 1777, and Brooks was taken to Halifax, Nova Scotia, as a prisoner of war. There, he contracted smallpox. He was released as part of an exchange, and returned home to Medford, albeit in poor health.

== Death ==
Brooks died on May 6, 1781, aged 47. He is interred in Oak Grove Cemetery in Medford, alongside his wife, who survived him by nineteen years.
