= Harlan Prince =

American sea captain in the 19th century

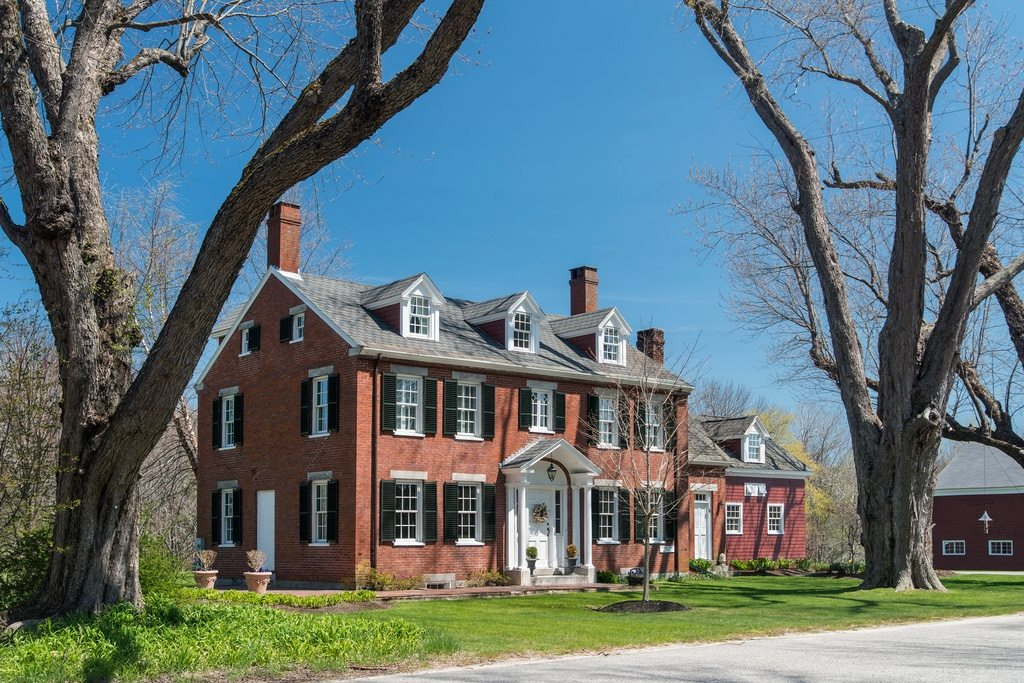
- The Captain Reuben Prince House, built by Prince's father, in which he lived between 1870 and 1899. This view is looking northeast from Gilman Road
- Born: Harlan Page Prince; June 9, 1837; North Yarmouth, Maine, U.S.
- Died: March 5, 1899 (aged 60); Yarmouth, Maine, U.S.
- Occupation: Sea captain
- Spouses: Annie Cushing Prince; Clara Blanchard Gooding (m. 1890)
- Parent(s): Reuben Prince; Deborah Drinkwater

Harlan Page Prince (June 9, 1837 – March 5, 1899) was an American sea captain in the 19th century. He began going to sea at the age of fifteen in a career that lasted for forty years. He commanded eight ships during his career.

Upon retirement, he became a member of the Maine House of Representatives.

== Life and career ==
Prince was born to Captain Reuben Prince and Deborah Drinkwater, their youngest son. He was educated in the public schools of North Yarmouth, Maine, then at North Yarmouth Academy.

At the age of fifteen, he began to go to sea. Shipbuilding at Yarmouth harbor was in full swing, and he became interested in becoming captain of one of the ships. Eventually, he commanded the following ships: Aeronaut, Emma, Agenora, Ester, B. Webster, Onaway, Carrie Heckle, Wm. G. Davis.

Upon his father's death in 1870, Harlan inherited the property now known as the Captain Reuben Prince House at 210 Gilman Road in today's Yarmouth. It remained in the Cushing family until Harlan's death.

He retired from the seas in 1892, when he was captain of the Wm. G Davis, and became a member of the United States House of Representatives for the State of Maine.

Prince was married twice: firstly to Annie Cushing Prince, with whom he had one daughter, then to Clara Blanchard Gooding, with whom he had two children: Harlan Page Jr. (who died around the age of fifteen) and Jessie May.

In 1896, he was elected to represent the towns of Yarmouth and North Yarmouth in the House. He was re-elected two years later.

== Death ==
The Prince family marker at Riverside Cemetery in Yarmouth. Annie, Prince's first wife, is listed on the right-hand side in this image

Prince died on March 5, 1899, at his home, after a week-long bout of sickness. He was sixty-one years old. According to W. C. Fogg, of Freeport, Maine, Prince had left the Maine State House on February 24 apparently in "perfect health"; soon after arriving home, however, he contracted a severe cold, which turned into pneumonia.

My personal relationship with Captain Prince has been most cordial. There have been times during the session when I have been obliged to be absent; on returning, he would always say to me: 'Fogg, I can't have you absent any more. You don't know how I miss you.' Mr. Speaker and gentlemen of the House, how these words come back to me now, when I look at his vacant chair.

— W. C. Fogg

He was buried in Yarmouth's Riverside Cemetery, alongside both of his wives, beneath a family marker.
