= Captain Joseph Drinkwater House =

Historic home in Maine, United States

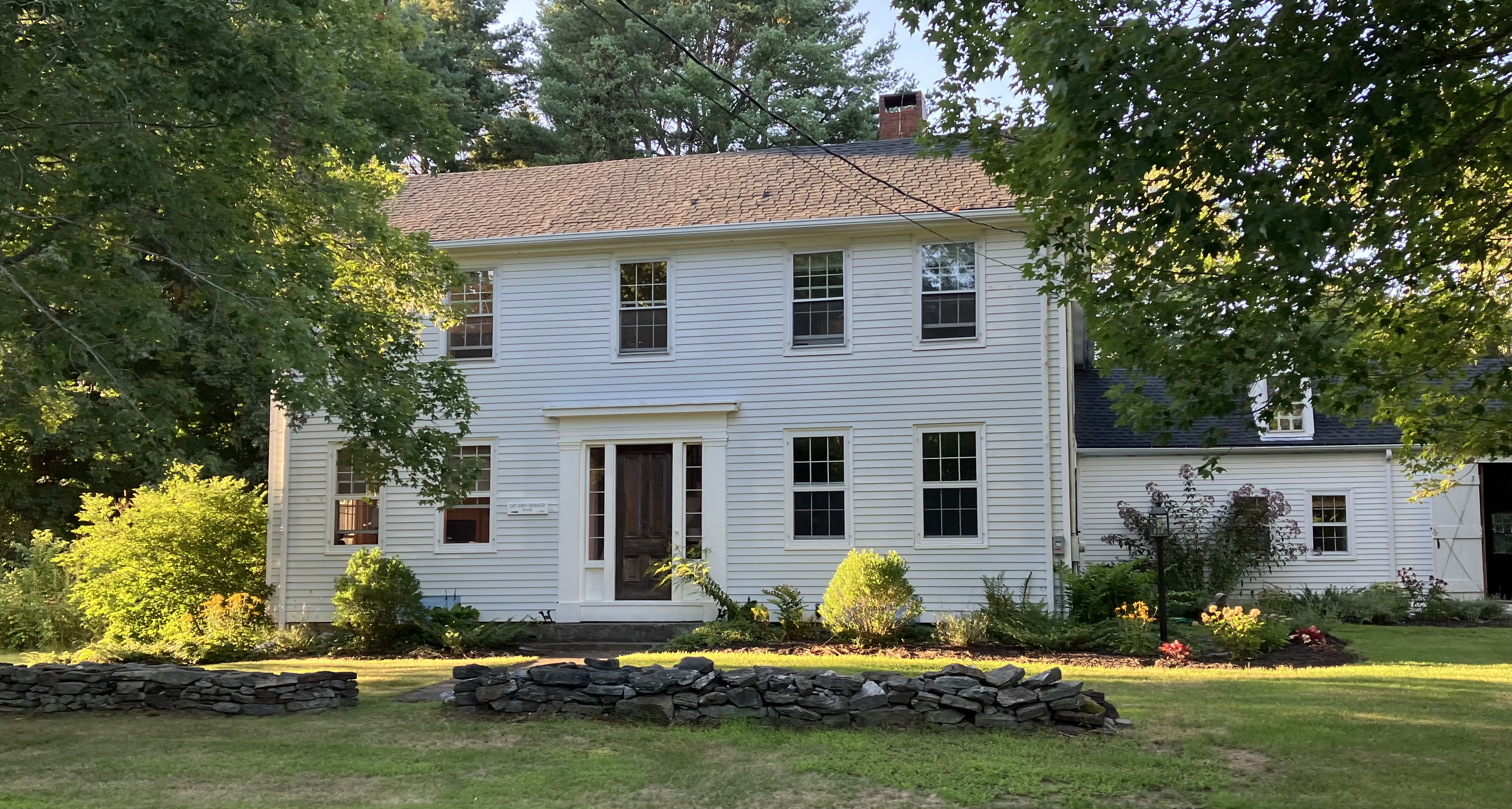
- The building in 2022
- Interactive map of the Captain Joseph Drinkwater House area

General information
- Location: Yarmouth, Maine, U.S., 146 Gilman Road
- Coordinates: 43.7861825051°N 70.16949384°W
- Completed: 1844 (182 years ago)

Technical details
- Floor count: 2

The Captain Joseph Drinkwater House is an historic home at 146 Gilman Road in Yarmouth, Maine, United States. Built in 1844, an architectural survey undertaken in 2018 found it had "important ties to Yarmouth history", for it was the home of the seafaring Drinkwater family for over a century.

Sea captain Joseph Drinkwater built the house, which stands at the intersection of Princes Point Road, and it remained in his immediate family until 1873. In 1902, Sumner Drinkwater, another sea captain, purchased the property. It was in his family's possession for 77 years.

The home's English-style barn, which is connected to the main structure, also retains its architectural integrity.

As of 2019, the property was the home of Jeremy Fischer, a member of the Maine House of Representatives.

== See also ==
- Historical buildings and structures of Yarmouth, Maine
