= Gilman Road =

Prominent street in Yarmouth, Maine

Coordinates: 43.78619°N 70.160515°W

- Interactive map of Gilman Road
- Namesake: Tristram Gilman
- Length: 1.7 mi (2.7 km)
- Location: Yarmouth, Maine, U.S.
- Northern end: Lafayette Street (Maine State Route 88)
- Southern end: Cousins Street

Construction
- Completion: 1780 (246 years ago)

Gilman Road is a prominent street in Yarmouth, Maine, United States. It runs for about 1.7 miles (2.7 km) from Lafayette Street (State Route 88) in the northwest to the Ellis C. Snodgrass Memorial Bridge at White's Cove in the southeast. At the bridge, which connects the Yarmouth mainland to Cousins Island, the road becomes Cousins Road.

One of the first streets laid out in the town, it was later named for Tristram Gilman, the fourth pastor of the Meetinghouse under the Ledge, which stood near the road's intersection with today's Lafayette Street between 1729 and 1836, prior to Yarmouth's secession from North Yarmouth. (He was also the original 1771 occupant of what is now known as the Gilman Manse, which is located at 463 Lafayette Street.)

A 2021 Historic Preservation Advisory Ordinance identified ten Local Historic Landmarks, three Historic Districts and three Historic Objects. Many are located in the Gilman Road and Pleasant Street areas, which leads to the possibility of it being a future historic district.

Yarmouth's West Side Trail crosses Gilman Road a short distance east of the Pioneer Cemetery.

== Notable buildings and structures ==
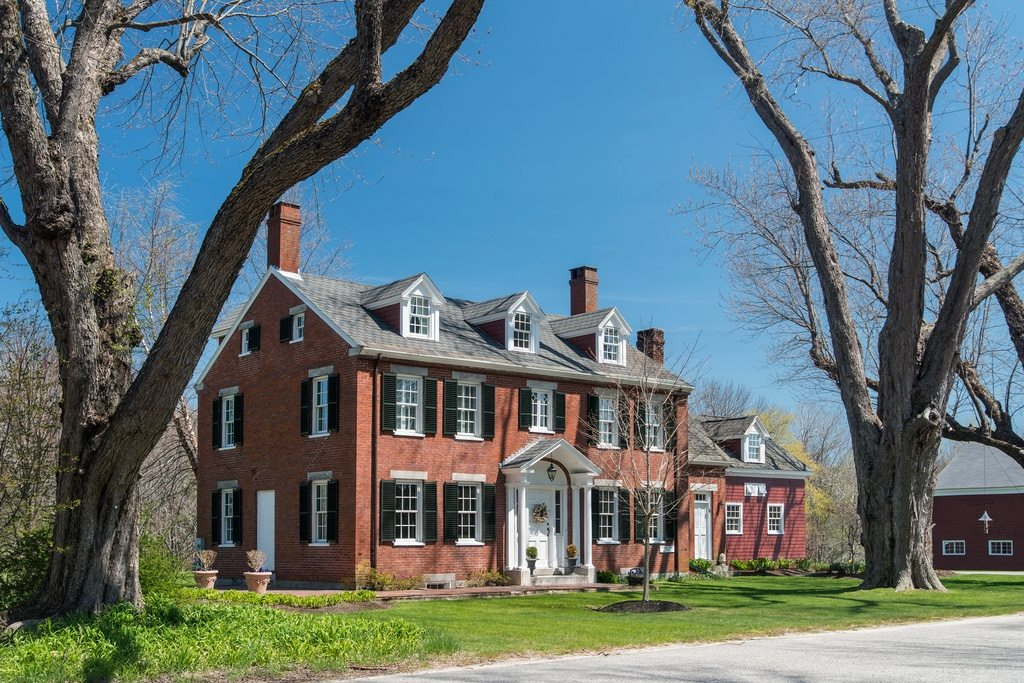
Captain Reuben Prince House in 2022

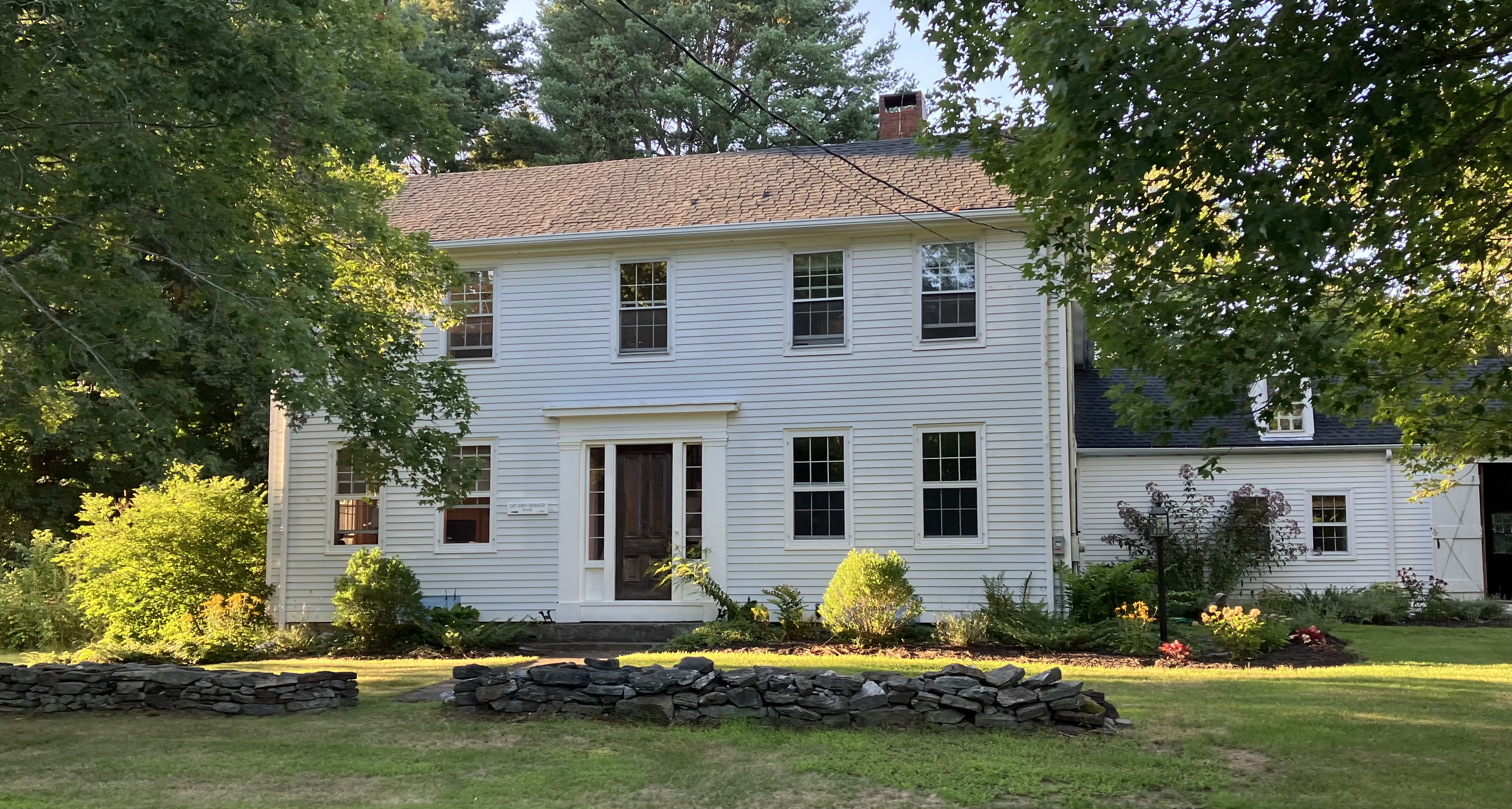
Captain Joseph Drinkwater House in 2022

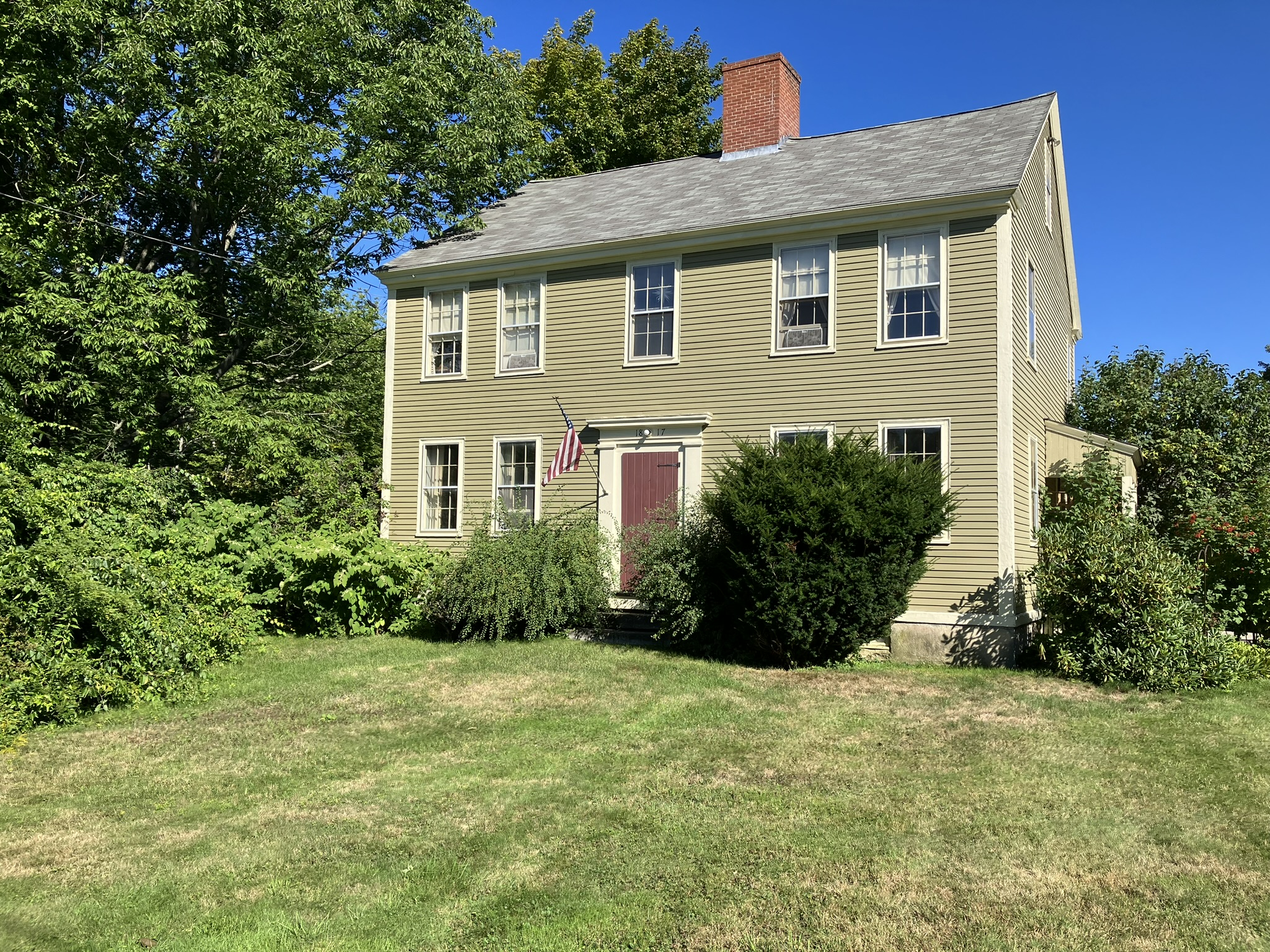
310 Gilman Road, built in 1817, is the former home of Mrs. Drinkwater

Gilman Road was laid out in 1780 to provide access to Larrabee's Landing.

Captain Francis E. Young lived between the two cemeteries at the northern end of the street. He is buried in the Ledge Cemetery. The garrison-style Cutter House at number 60, built circa 1730, is the oldest standing house in Yarmouth. Situated directly opposite the Pioneer Cemetery, it was the former home of the Ledge Church's first minister, Reverend Ammi Ruhamah Cutter. (Cutter was succeeded in the role by Englishman Nicholas Loring, who is buried in the Ledge cemetery.) Perez B. Loring lived there in the mid-19th century. For the second half of the 20th century, it was home to Charles and Anita Stickney, who purchased it from Henry Pennell Frank. Charles Stickney bought his father's company, Deering Ice Cream, in 1956. It had twenty locations in three states in its peak years. He died in 2011 at the age of 89; Anita died five years later, aged 90.

In 1738, the Old Ledge School was constructed on Gilman Road. It was moved a short distance to the side of Route 88, at the foot of the hill where the West Side Trail crosses the road, in the mid-19th century. In 1972, it was reconstructed and moved to just beyond the brick schools on West Main Street.

120 Gilman Road, near the northeastern corner of the intersection, was built in 1773. Its barn is mid-19th century.

Moving east, crossing Princes Point Road, eight historic homes exist in the stretch leading up to Cousins Island. On the left (number 146) is formerly that of Captain Joseph Drinkwater and his wife, Anna. The house was built in 1844, and his family owned it until 1873. Captain Sumner Drinkwater purchased it in 1902, and it remained in his family until 1979, ending 107 consecutive years of Drinkwater ownership. Next, on the right, is 161, once the home of Samuel Allen Prince.

Further down, on the left at 210 Gilman Road, is the Captain Reuben Prince House. Built around 1817, some thirty years before the town's incorporation, it was originally the home of Reuben Prince (1792–1870), a sea captain, who lived there with his wife, Deborah Drinkwater (1794–1878). They were the parents of neighbor Samuel. Prince was listed as one of the owners of the schooner Boston, which was built in Yarmouth Harbor in 1842 and registered, firstly in Portland and Falmouth, Maine, in 1850, then in Machias, in 1856. The home, which sits on 9.2 acres, contains some architectural work undertaken by John Calvin Stevens. Upon Reuben's death in 1870, the home passed to his youngest son, Harlan Prince, who was also a sea captain and, upon retiring from the seas in 1892, became a member of the Maine House of Representatives. It remained in the Prince family until Harlan's death.

Arthur and Josie Fels bought the property, and its considerable land, in 1907. Conservation land on the opposite side of Gilman Road is now known as the Fels-Groves Preserve.

The home was restored and renovated between 2002 and 2004. It contains six bedrooms, three full bathrooms and one half bathroom. A carriage house stands adjacent to the east.

310 Gilman Road, an 1817-built house on the left at the beginning of the Larrabee's Landing curve, is formerly that of Mrs. Drinkwater.
