= West Side Trail =

- Length: 5.17 mi (8.32 km)
- Location: Yarmouth, Maine
- Trailheads: US 1, Yarmouth, Maine
- Use: Walking, running, biking
- Difficulty: Moderate

The West Side Trail is a multi-use trail in Yarmouth, Maine. A Town of Yarmouth project conceived in 1988 and opened in 2014, the trailhead for the eastern portion of the trail is in the parking lot of Tyler Technologies, on Tyler Drive, on the eastern side of U.S. Route 1, immediately before the exit 15 northbound on-ramp to Interstate 295 (I-295). The trailhead for the western section is in the park and ride lot at the southbound exit 15 ramp for I-295, to the west of Route 1.

== Phase one ==
500 volunteer hours were put into the project, headed by Dan Ostrye of Yarmouth's town trail committee. In 2010, Ostrye signed a lease agreement for the town with Central Maine Power so that the trail could be run through woods and meadows on Cousins Island and over the causeway to woods on CMP property on the mainland.

The trail largely follows the overhead power lines originating from the Wyman Power Station, which is at the trail terminus near the southern tip of Cousins Island, 5.17 miles from the trailhead.

The first stretch rises northeast over a rocky bluff between US 1 and Route 88. When the trail returns to grade level, it crosses Route 88 (Lafayette Street) just a few feet north of Garrison Lane and continues southeast through the woods to a crossing at Gilman Road, which it traverses to the east of the Indian Fighters' burial ground. It then carries on to Princes Point Road. Drinkwater Point Road is the next crossing, before the trail emerges back onto Gilman Road just short of the Cousins Island (Snodgrass) Bridge. After crossing the bridge, the trail restarts at the northern end of the Sandy Point Beach parking lot. From here the trail crosses seven more, much quieter roads: Castle View Drive, Groves Road, Sea Meadows Lane, Tidewater Lane, Talbot Road (the sole outlet to Littlejohn Island), Shore View Drive and Wharf Road.

There are four areas where an alternative (and shorter) route is available. These are in the first section; the Gilman-to-Princes Point section; the Princes Point-to-Drinkwater Point section; and the Sandy Point Beach section. Additionally, there are three side loops in the first section and one connector, to the southern section of the Fels-Groves Farm Preserve, in the Princes Point-to-Drinkwater Point section.

== Phase two ==
The second phase was started in 2018. It begins to the west of Route 1, originating from the I-295 exit 15 southbound park and ride lot, crosses the St. Lawrence and Atlantic Railroad and Portland Street and ends at West Elm Street. It will eventually connect major neighborhoods, including Oakwood, Applewood and the new (as of 2017) McKearney Village. Unlike the original phase, which was designed for single-track mountain biking and single-file walking or running, the second allows for universal access, thanks to a five-foot-wide (1.5 m) gravel track.

This section also follows the power lines.

== Phase three ==
Hillside Avenue and Greely Road are the planned connecting points to growing trail networks in North Yarmouth and Cumberland, as well as the Twin Brooks recreation area and the new Knight's Pond Reserve. Crossing of active railroad tracks at Yarmouth Junction on Greely Road present "considerable safety and cost issues".

In January 2022, the Royal River Conservation Trust's board voted unanimously to donate $5000 toward the campaign to complete "The Last Mile" of the trail, which would take it past Twin Brooks.

== Mileages ==
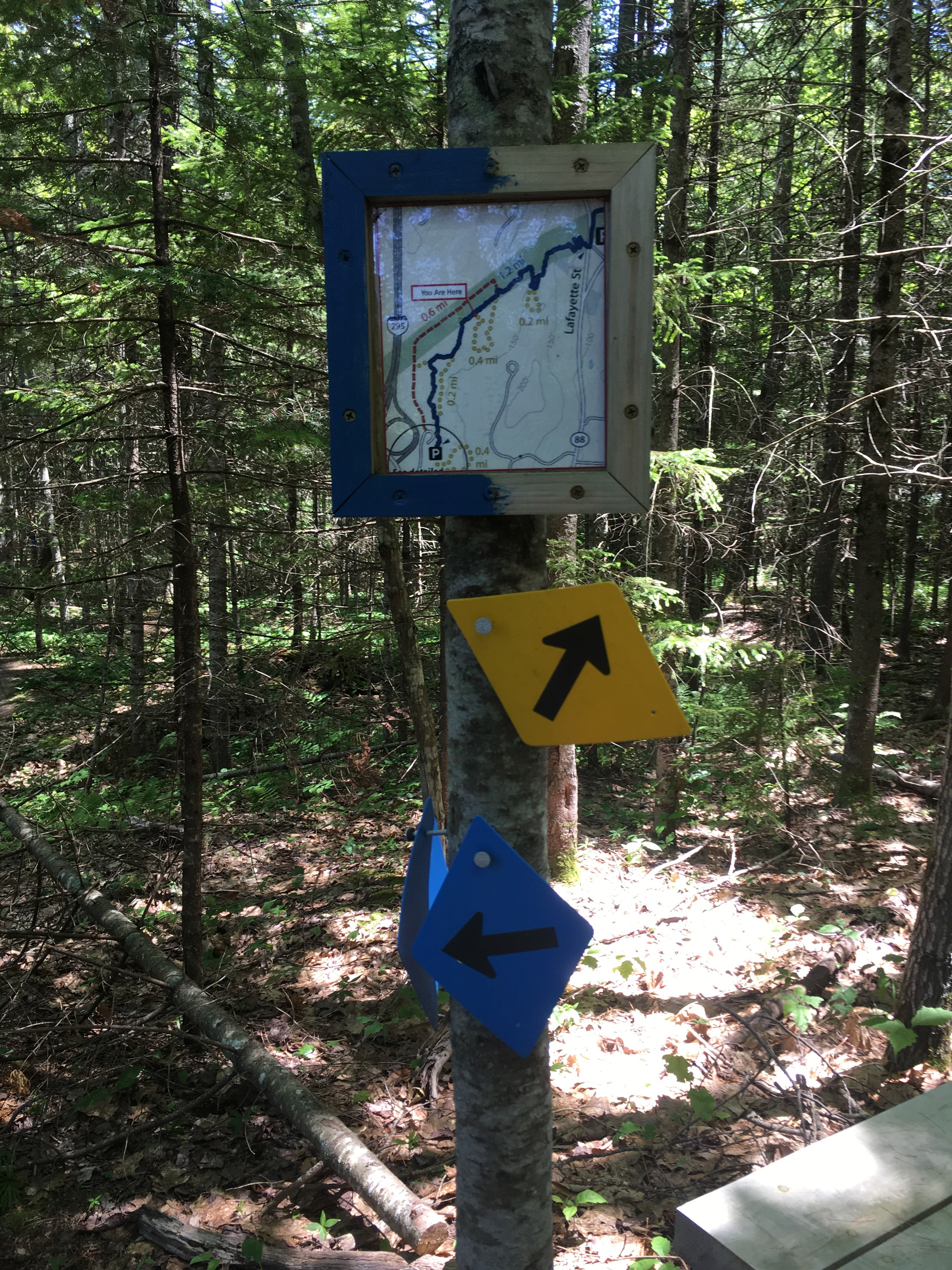
An example of the signage on the trail. This one denotes a side loop near the trailhead

Distances measured by GPS; may differ from trail map (cumulative distances in parentheses).

For the section to the east of Route 1

- Trailhead at Route 1
- 1.0 mile to Route 88
- 0.25 (1.25) miles to Gilman Road
- 0.49 (1.74) miles to Princes Point Road
- 0.17 (1.91) to Fels-Groves parking lot turnoff
- 0.36 (2.27) miles to Drinkwater Point Road
- 0.9 (3.17) miles to Sandy Point Beach
- 0.7 (3.87) miles, including crossings on Castle View Drive, Groves Road and Sea Meadows Lane
- 0.5 (4.37) miles, including crossings on Tidewater Lane and Talbot Road
- 0.6 (4.97) miles, including crossings on Shorewater View Drive and Wharf Road
- 0.2 (5.17) miles – forest loop back to Wharf Road
