= Meetinghouse under the Ledge =

Historic church in Maine, United States

- Old Ledge Meetinghouse
- Conjectural painting of the church. This view is facing northwest, with the ledge of Westcustogo Hill in the background
- Meetinghouse under the Ledge
- 43.7855°N 70.1753°W
- Location: Garrison Lane, Yarmouth, Maine, U.S.
- Denomination: Congregational

History
- Status: Demolished
- Founded: November 18, 1730
- Consecrated: 1730

Architecture
- Years built: 1729
- Closed: 1820
- Demolished: 1836 (190 years ago)

The Meetinghouse under the Ledge, also known as the Old Ledge Meetinghouse, was a church that stood in present-day Yarmouth, Maine, between 1729 and 1836. It was the ninth church founded in Maine.

Named for the ledge that rises as Westcustogo Hill to the west of its former location, only the church's eastern doorstep remains, beside today's Garrison Lane.

== History ==
The meetinghouse was built in 1729, when the town was North Yarmouth, Province of Massachusetts Bay, from material floated down the Royal River from the First Falls and hauled up by oxen from Larrabee's Landing, further down Gilman Road, towards Cousins Island.

The congregation was founded in November 1730, and its first minister was Reverend Ammi Ruhamah Cutter. Some members of the congregation had to travel several miles to attend sermons, some arriving by boat from today's Harpswell. They were armed with muskets, wary of hostile American Indians.

The church was enlarged and had a steeple and a copper banner weathervane added in 1762.

The congregation moved twice after abandoning this church in 1820, and today meets at the First Parish Congregational Church on Main Street in Yarmouth, about 1 mile (1.6 km) north of this location.

In 1836, sixteen years after the meetinghouse was both abandoned and Maine's admittance to the Union, it was torn down. The weathervane was rescued during the demolition work. In 1838, it was mounted as a shipping guide on an iron rod atop the ledge, overlooking the meetinghouse, by a group of Yarmouth residents. They had raised funds to buy the weathervane from Solomon Winslow, who had removed it from the demolition site. The weathervane is now on display at the Yarmouth History Center, but its old supports still exist high up in the woods on the western side of Lafayette Street. They are passed by the West Side Trail.

=== List of pastors ===
There were five pastors of the Ledge Meetinghouse during its ninety-year operation:

- Ammi Ruhamah Cutter (1730–1735)
- Nicholas Loring (1735–1763)
- Edward Brooks (1764–1769)
- Tristram Gilman (1769–1809)
- Francis Brown (1809–1820)

== Parsonage ==
The Cutter House at 60 Gilman Road, built circa 1730, is the oldest extant building in Yarmouth. It was originally the parsonage of Reverend Ammi Ruhamah Cutter.

== Cemeteries ==
Two cemeteries are located nearby. Across Gilman Road from the former parsonage is the small, half-acre 1731 Pioneer Cemetery (also known as the Indian Fighters cemetery), which was the first public burial place in Old North Yarmouth. At the corner of Gilman Road and Lafayette Street is the 2.5-acre 1770 Ledge Cemetery. (Some headstones bear dates earlier than 1770, for many bodies were removed from the older cemetery.)
