= Tristram Gilman =

American minister

The Reverend Tristram Gilman
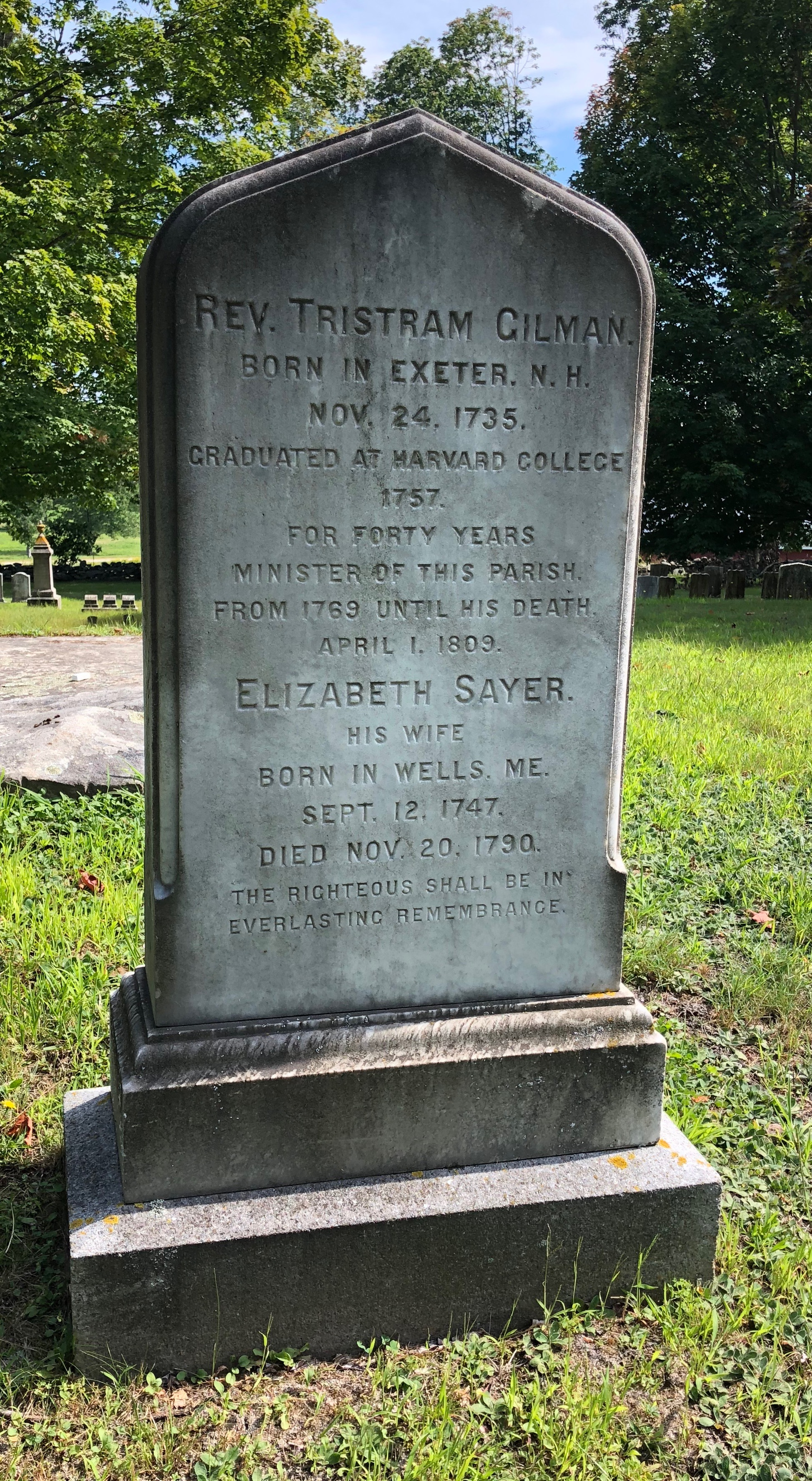
- Gilman's headstone
- Born: November 24, 1735; Exeter, Province of New Hampshire
- Died: April 1, 1809 (aged 73); North Yarmouth, Massachusetts, U.S.
- Resting place: Ledge Cemetery, Yarmouth, Maine, U.S.
- Occupation: Minister
- Years active: 1769–1809; his death

Tristram Gilman (November 24, 1735 – April 1, 1809) was an American Congregational minister who served as the fourth pastor of the "Old Ledge" meetinghouse in what was then North Yarmouth, Massachusetts (now Yarmouth, Maine), for forty years. Gilman Road, adjacent to where the church formerly stood, is now named for him.

== Early life ==
Gilman was born in Exeter, Province of New Hampshire, in 1735. The son of Reverend Nicholas Gilman (who died when Tristram was twelve years old), and Mary Thing, he graduated from Harvard College in 1757. His younger brother, Joseph (1738–1806), was a judge in Marietta, Ohio. Joseph's son and Tristram's nephew, Benjamin Ives Gilman (1766–1833), was a shipbuilder and an extensive landowner in Ohio. Another cousin, Nicholas Gilman (1755–1814), was a Founding Father of the United States.

== Ministry ==
Gilman moved to Maine in the second half of the 18th century. He was ordained as minister at the now-demolished "Old Ledge" meeting house, in the Broad Cove area of the town, on December 8, 1769. He remained in the role until his death exactly forty years later, in 1809.

Shortly after taking the position, he became the original 1771 occupant of the Gilman Manse house at today's 463 Lafayette Street. John Calvin Stevens later renovated the property.

Reverend Edward Brooks, who was Gilman's classmate at Harvard, was also his predecessor at the Ledge Church. In his Catalogue of the First Church, Reverend David Shepley, the second minister of the second incarnation of the church, wrote of Gilman: "[He possesses] a vigorous physical frame, endowed with strong features in his mental constitution, studious, evangelical, ever diligent and enterprising in the duties of his calling, he soon attained uncommon ascendancy over the minds of his people, rose to eminence in the vicinity, and at his departure left his strong impress on the place blessed by his long-continued and successful labors and influence."

Gilman once declared in a sermon that Thomas Jefferson was the Antichrist.

The Ledge church, which was founded on November 18, 1730, was torn down in 1836, twenty-seven years after Gilman's death and sixteen years after it was abandoned by the Parish.

== Personal life ==
Gilman married Elizabeth Sayer (1747–1790), a native of Wells, Maine, around the time he began his ministry at the Old Ledge Church. He survived his wife for almost nineteen years, after her death on November 20, 1790.

Their eldest daughter, Elizabeth Gilman (1776–1851), married Francis Brown, an 1805 graduate of Dartmouth College and later its third president. Their son was Samuel Gilman Brown. Samuel's son, another Francis Brown, was a theologian.

Theodosia, another daughter, was born in 1788.

In 1789, Gilman had published The Right Education of Children Recommended by Samuel Hall Publishers in Boston.

== Death ==
Gilman died in 1809, aged 73. He is buried near the former site of his church, in the Ledge Cemetery, alongside his wife. (It is said in at least one source that his headstone rests immediately in front of the extant ledge threshold of his former church, but the church was located across Gilman Road, and there are old gravestones immediately behind the granite. It is believed the slab covers the entrance to an underground tomb.) His son-in-law, Francis Brown, was invited to preach before the Congregational church. Brown accepted the position of pastor, with the proviso that the church building, which had been in use for nearly eighty years, be discontinued. The second church (known as Old Sloop) was built in 1818, at the eastern corner of Main and Bridge Streets (at present-day 121 Main Street), but it was abandoned in 1868 and torn down in 1879.
