= Ammi Ruhamah Cutter (minister) =

American minister

The Reverend Ammi Ruhamah Cutter
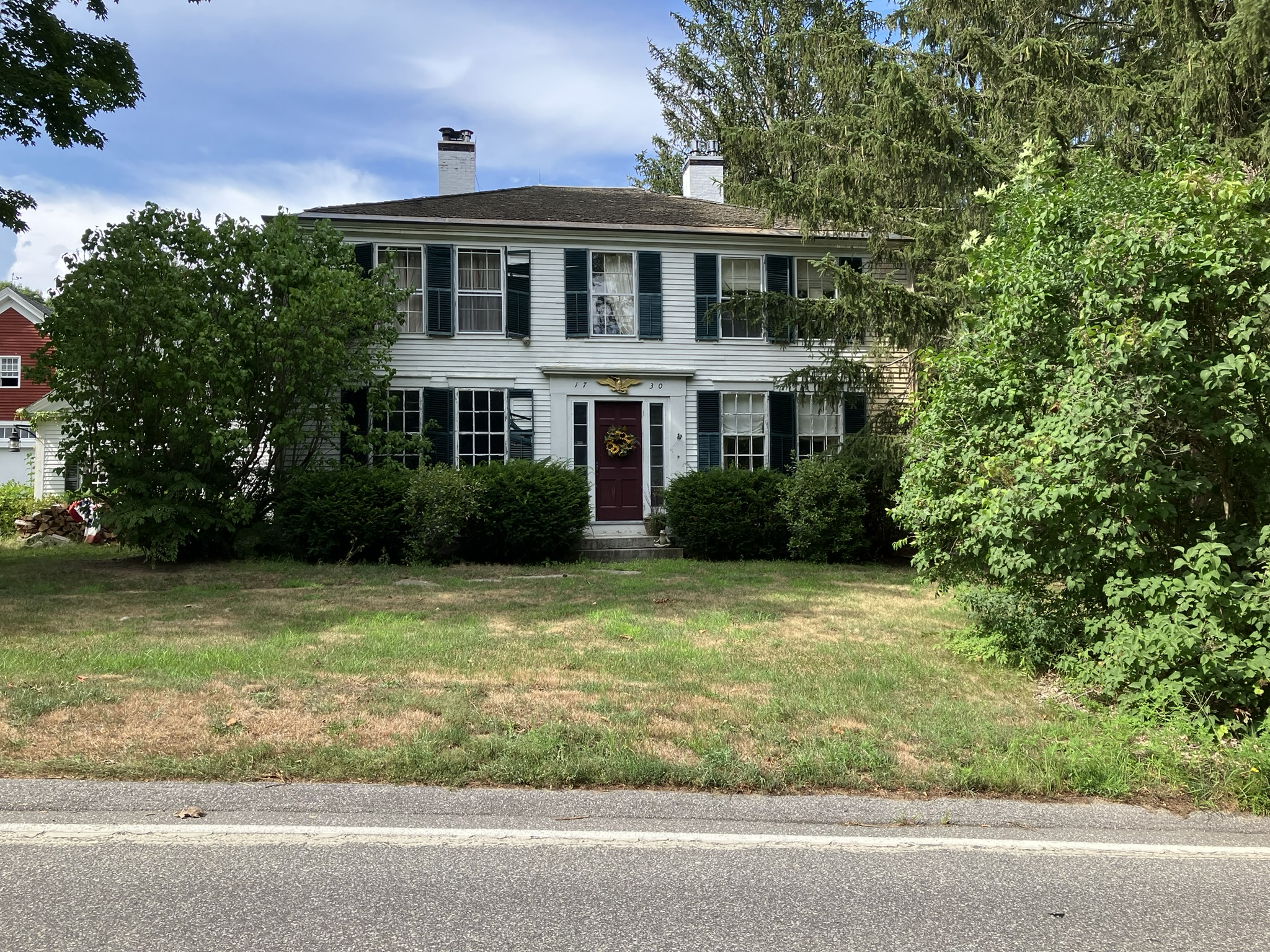
- The Cutter House in Yarmouth, Maine (2022)
- Born: Before May 6, 1705; Cambridge, Province of Massachusetts Bay
- Died: March 1746 (aged 40 or 41); Louisbourg, Nova Scotia, Canada (New France)
- Resting place: Ledge Cemetery, Yarmouth, Maine, U.S.
- Occupation: Minister
- Years active: 1729–1746; his death

Ammi Ruhamah Cutter (before May 6, 1705 – March 1746) was an American Congregational minister who served as the first pastor of the "Old Ledge" meetinghouse in what was then North Yarmouth, Province of Massachusetts Bay (now Yarmouth, Maine).

== Early life ==
Cutter was born in 1705 to William Cutter and Rebecca Whitmore. He was the youngest of their seven known children, and was baptized on May 6.

He graduated from Harvard College in 1725.

== Career ==
In 1729, Cutter was ordained the first pastor of the new Meetinghouse under the Ledge, in what was then North Yarmouth, Province of Massachusetts Bay (now Yarmouth, Maine). He and his family lived at the parsonage at today's 60 Gilman Road (now known as the Cutter House), around 150 yards to the east of where the church formerly stood, which was garrisoned during the Indian wars.

He preached his first sermon, as candidate, on November 10, 1729, in a "convenient house for the public worship of God". The church was formally organized on November 18 the following year. He remained in the town for seven years as a physician.

In 1735, he was dismissed from his role due to alleged Arminianism. His forthright liberal views were at odds with the congregation's Calvinist persuasions. They also found his "creed [was] becoming offensive".

Cutter moved in 1742 to Saco, where he wrote a dictionary of the Indian language.

He later became captain of a company in Sir William Pepperrell's Duc d'Anville expedition. His command was attached to colonel Jeremiah Moulton's regiment from York County. After the capture of that fort, he was detailed to remain as surgeon.

== Personal life ==
Cutter married Dorothy Bradbury on August 14, 1734, in Newbury, Province of Massachusetts Bay. She was the sister of Moses Bradbury, an early town resident. They had four known children, including Dr. Ammi Ruhamah Cutter (1735–1820), a fellow graduate of Harvard College.

In 2015, Yarmouth Historical Society acquired a bible which belonged to Cutter.

== Death ==
Cutter died, aged 42, of dysentery in March 1746 while in Louisbourg, Nova Scotia, Canada (New France). His remains were returned to North Yarmouth by corporal Benjamin Morgridge. His wife survived him by thirty years; she died in 1776, aged 68.
