= Pioneer Cemetery (Yarmouth, Maine) =

Cemetery in Yarmouth, Maine

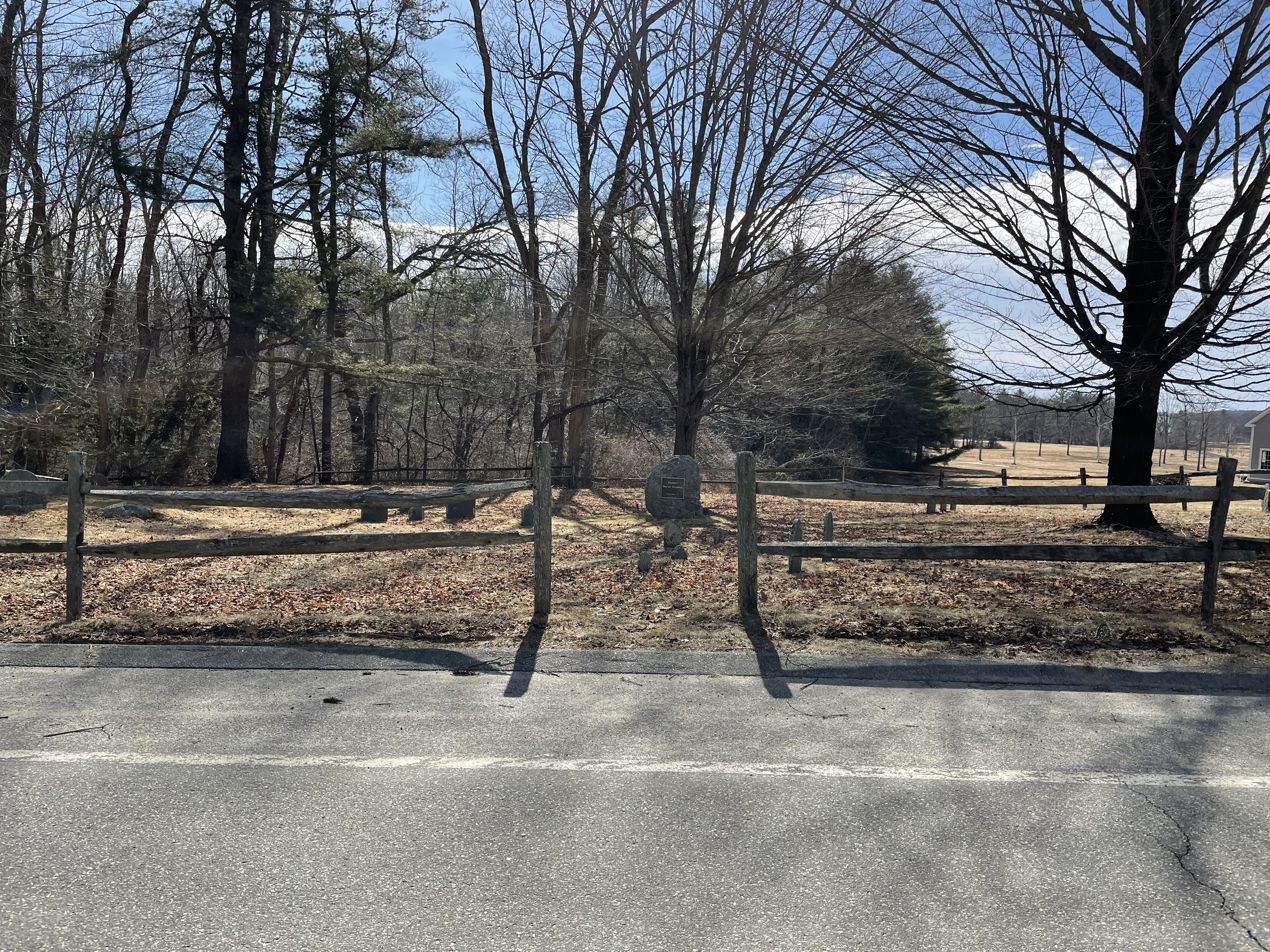
- The cemetery in 2022. The memorial plaque on the boulder replaced an earlier one that was deemed offensive to some
- Interactive map of Pioneer Cemetery

Details
- Established: 1731 (295 years ago)
- Closed: 1770 (256 years ago)
- Location: Gilman Road; Yarmouth, Maine
- Country: United States
- Coordinates: 43.7856°N 70.1735°W
- Owned by: Town of Yarmouth
- Size: 0.5 acres (0.20 ha)
- Find a Grave: Pioneer Cemetery

Pioneer Cemetery, also known as the Pioneers Burial Ground and the Indian Fighters Cemetery, is a historic cemetery in Yarmouth, Maine, United States. Dating to 1731, it was the first public burial place in Old North Yarmouth, which was then part of the Province of Massachusetts Bay. It stands on Gilman Road, around 450 feet (140 m) northeast of the Ledge Cemetery, and almost directly across Gilman Road from the Cutter House, which was completed a year earlier.

The cemetery closed to burials in 1770, when the Ledge Cemetery was established. Several burials were moved to the new cemetery.

== Notable burials ==
At the time of the cemetery's establishment, there were no stone cutters in southern Maine, so families who could afford it had headstones made in Boston and shipped to North Yarmouth. Those families who could not afford such workmanship had their loved ones' burials marked with a piece of wood or a piece of local stone.

- Ebenezer Eaton (1674–1735), killed by Indians
- Captain Peter Weare (1695–1743)
- Joseph Weare (1737–1774), Indian fighter, son of Captain Peter, nicknamed the Scout
- Deacon Jacob Curry Mitchell (1672–1744)
- Captain James Parker (1689–1732), the oldest marker in the cemetery

Inscriptions recorded by Augustus W. Corliss in his late-19th-century publication Old Times in North Yarmouth, Maine, and later reprinted in Records of the American Catholic Historical Society of Philadelphia, include:

Here Lyes Buried the Body of
Mr. Andrew Ring
Aged 48 years
Died Nove. ye 17, 1744

and

Here Lyes buried ye body
of Capt. Stephen Larrabee
Departed this life
Oct. 20th. anno dom
1737

== Marker ==
The marker for the burial ground, which was attached to a boulder, was removed to the town's historical society in February 2019, having been in place for ninety years, because some people found the term describing the Abenaki Indians tribe "savage enemies" offensive. Information regarding the intended meaning of the text will be displayed alongside it at the museum.

The plaque reads:

Here rest those who in the third and permanent settlement of the town, defended it against the savage enemies, some at the sacrifice of their lives.

== Gallery ==
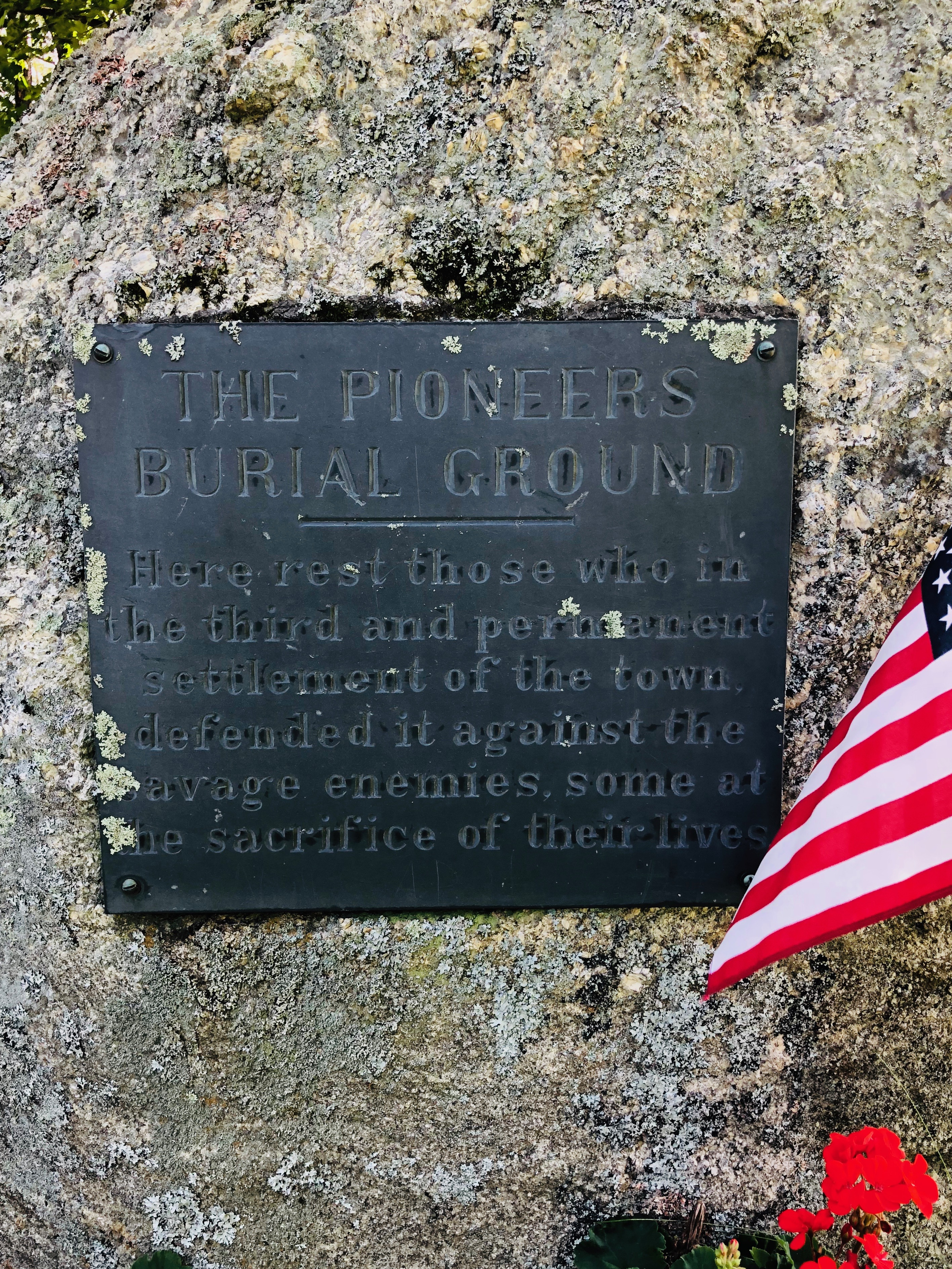
The cemetery's marker, prior to its removal

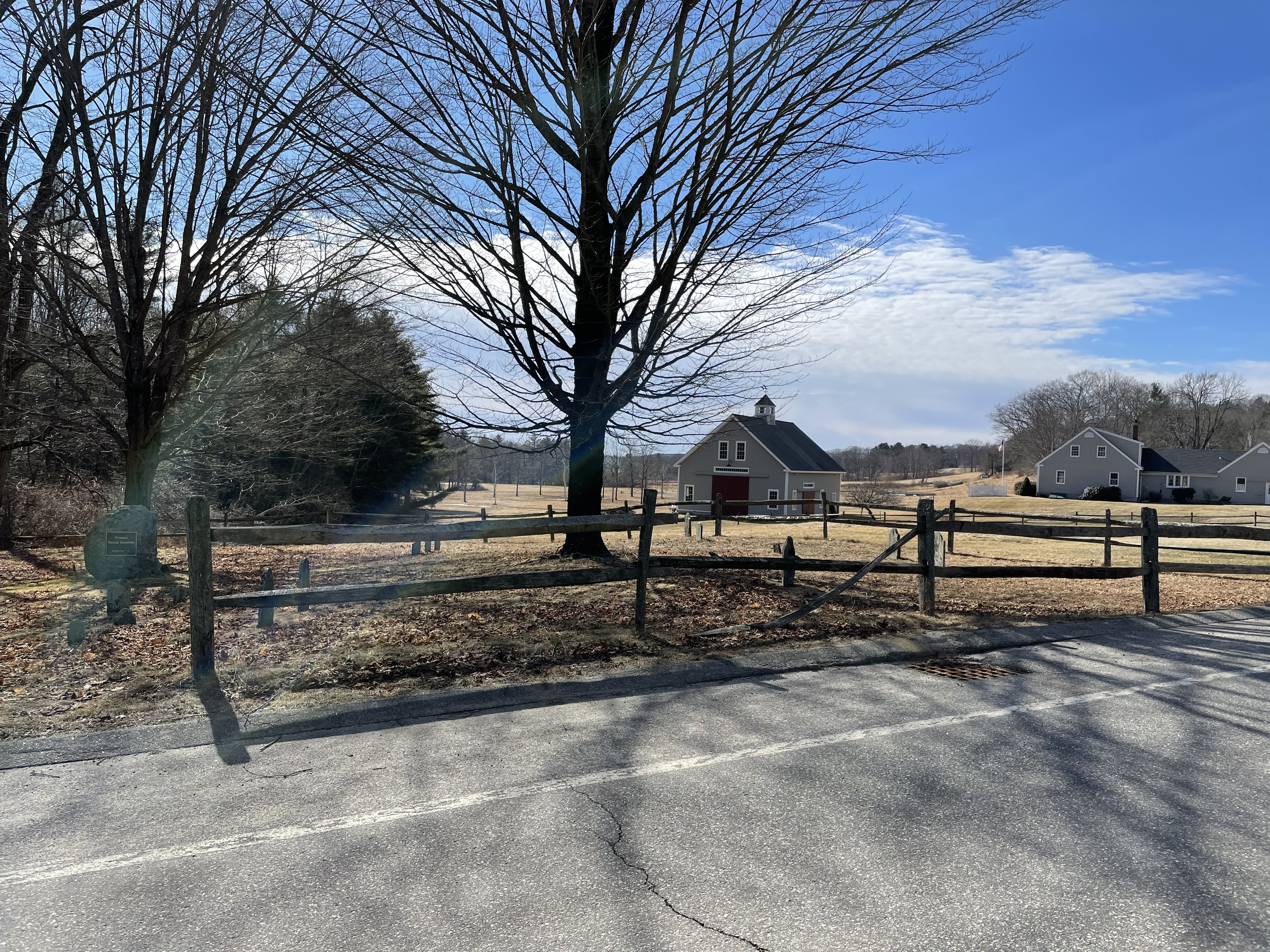
Looking southwest across the cemetery toward Broad Cove
