= Cutter House =

Historic house in Maine, United States

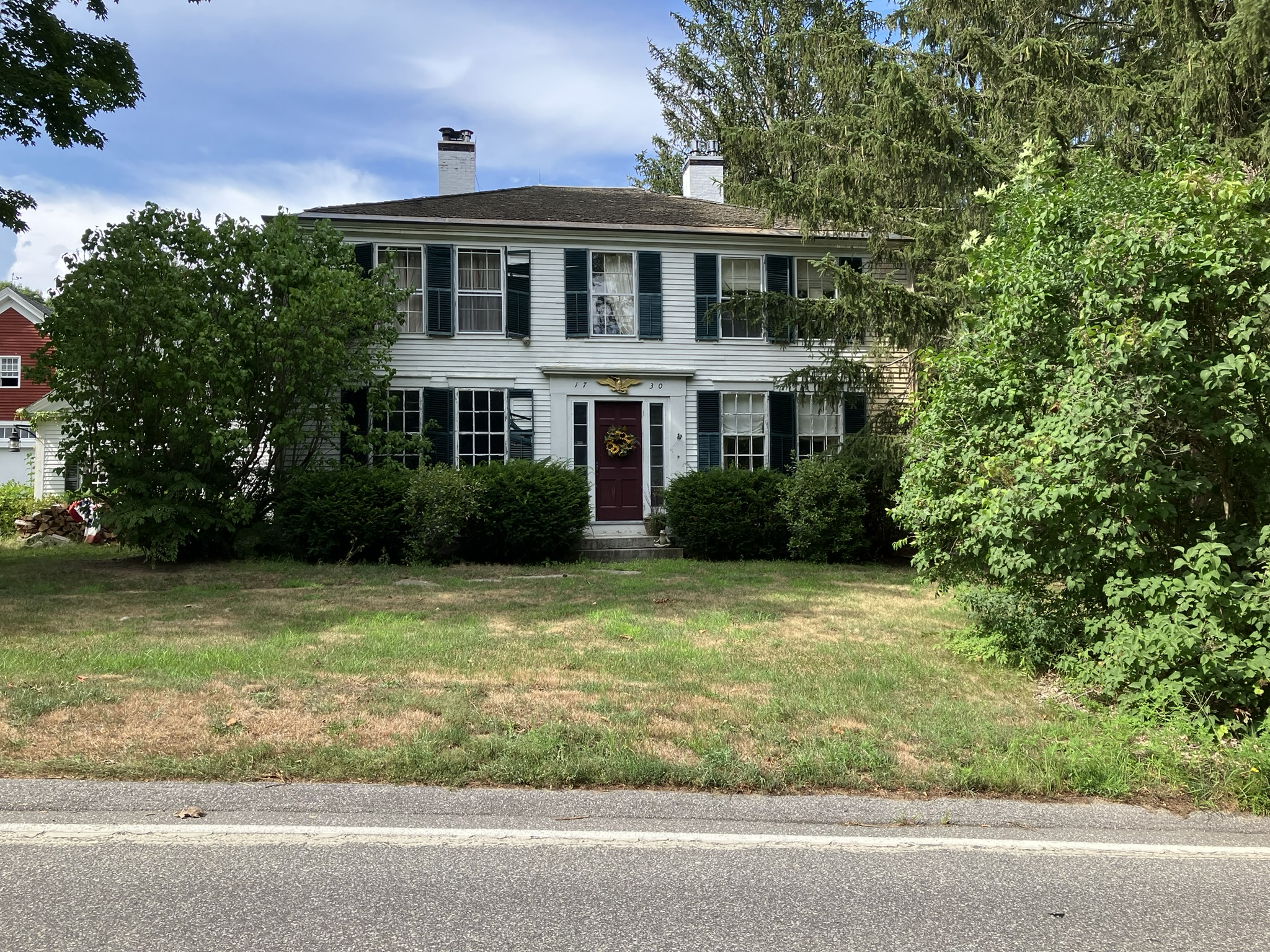
- The building in 2022
- Interactive map of the Cutter House area

General information
- Architectural style: Garrison
- Location: Yarmouth, Maine, U.S., 60 Gilman Road
- Coordinates: 43.78600914°N 70.1733798°W
- Completed: 1730 (296 years ago)

Technical details
- Floor count: 2

The Cutter House is an historic home at 60 Gilman Road in Yarmouth, Maine, United States. Built in 1730, over a century before today's Yarmouth was incorporated, it is the oldest extant building in the town. It was built for Ammi Ruhamah Cutter, the first minister of the now-demolished Meetinghouse under the Ledge, which stood around 150 yards (140 m) to the west, in the same strip of land between Gilman Road and Lafayette Street (Maine State Route 88), between 1729 and 1836. It stands almost directly across Gilman Road from the Pioneer Cemetery, which was established a year later. The home, the Pioneer Cemetery and the nearby Ledge Cemetery are all that remain of this early settlement.

Perez B. Loring lived at the Cutter House in the mid-19th century, after it was no longer a manse. For the second half of the 20th century, it was home to Charles and Anita Stickney, who purchased it from Henry Pennell Frank (1872–1948), who is interred in the Ledge Cemetery.

The home is two storeys, 4,595 square feet (426.9 m^{2}), with a hip roof. It has five bedrooms and four bathrooms amongst its fourteen total rooms.

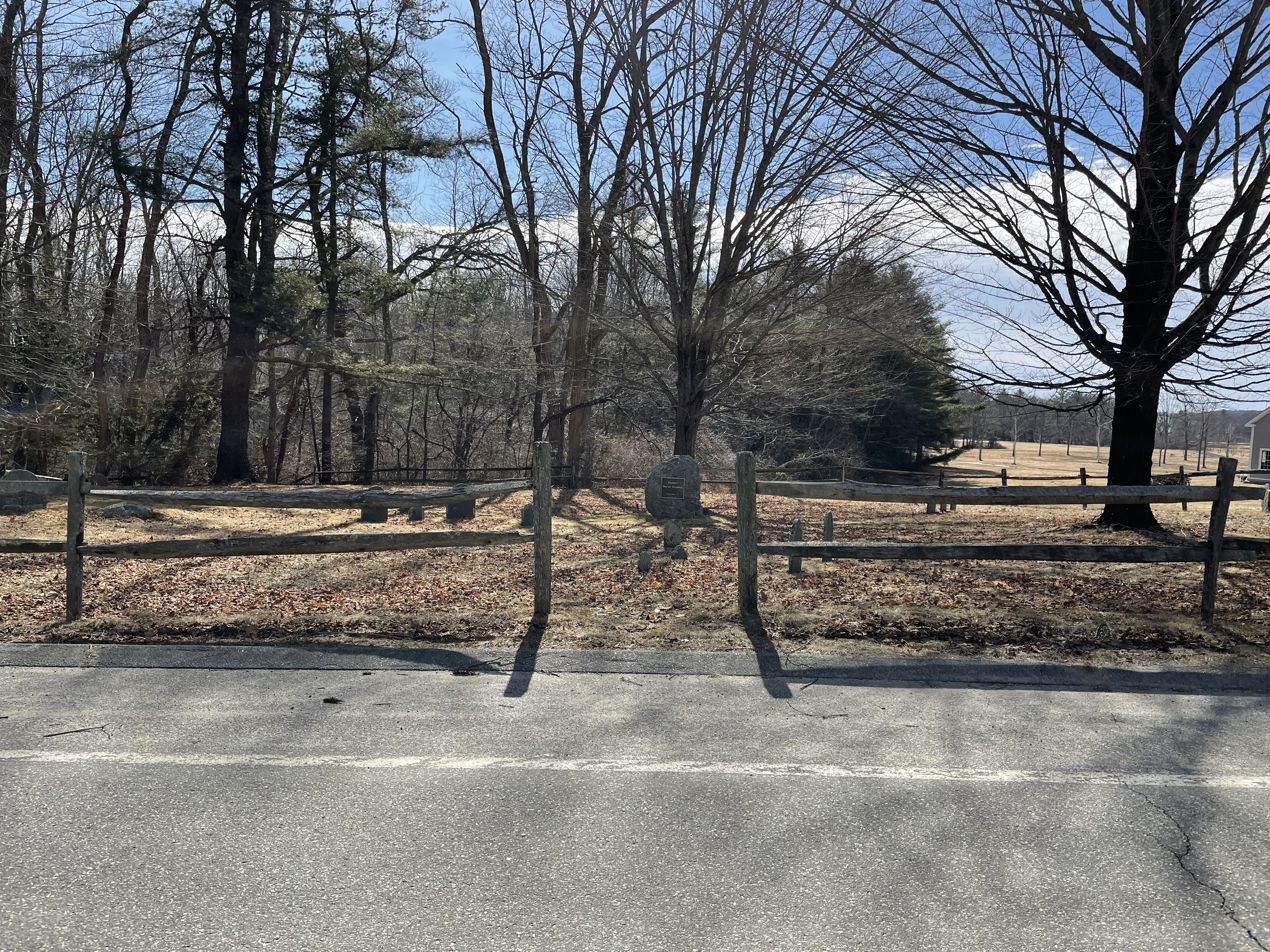
The home faces the Pioneer Cemetery

== See also ==
- Historical buildings and structures of Yarmouth, Maine
