= First Parish Congregational Church =

Historic church in Maine, United States

- U.S. National Register of Historic Places
- Pictured in 2026

- Location within Maine Location within the United States
- Location: 116 Main Street, Yarmouth, Maine
- Coordinates: 43°47′55″N 70°11′4″W
- Area: less than one acre
- Built: 1867 (159 years ago)
- Architect: George M. Harding; Charles Humphrey
- Architectural style: Italianate
- NRHP reference No.: 95000728
- Added to NRHP: June 20, 1995

The First Parish Congregational Church is a historic church at 116 Main Street in Yarmouth, Maine. The congregation was established in 1730, as the ninth church founded in what is now Maine. The current Italianate meeting house was constructed in 1867–68, and is an important surviving design of Portland architect George M. Harding. The building was added to the National Register of Historic Places in 1995. The present congregation is affiliated with the United Church of Christ.

== Description and history ==
Yarmouth's First Parish Congregational Church is located to the east of the town center, on the south side of Main Street (Maine State Route 115). It is a tall single-story wood-frame structure, with a gabled roof, an exterior sheathed in clapboard and flushboarded siding, and a granite foundation. A square tower projects slightly from the front, with a gabled entry vestibule projecting further in front of it. The entry consists of a pair of doorways, each flanked by thin composite columns and set in round-arch openings. A larger three-part round-arch window stands above them, with a banded frieze along the raking gable edge of the vestibule. The tower has four stages, and is elaborately decorated, with an open belfry and an octagonal spire.

The First Parish congregation was established in 1730, and first met in a meetinghouse, known as the Meetinghouse under the Ledge, about 1 mile (1.6 km) south of this location. In 1818, they moved to a new building, known as the Old Sloop, across the street from its current location. That building was turned into a public hall after the congregation moved out in 1868, and was demolished in 1879. The cost of the new church was $35,000.

The church was designed for the congregation by Portland architect George M. Harding, one of Maine's leading architects of the mid-19th century. It is one of only three church designs of his to survive in the state.

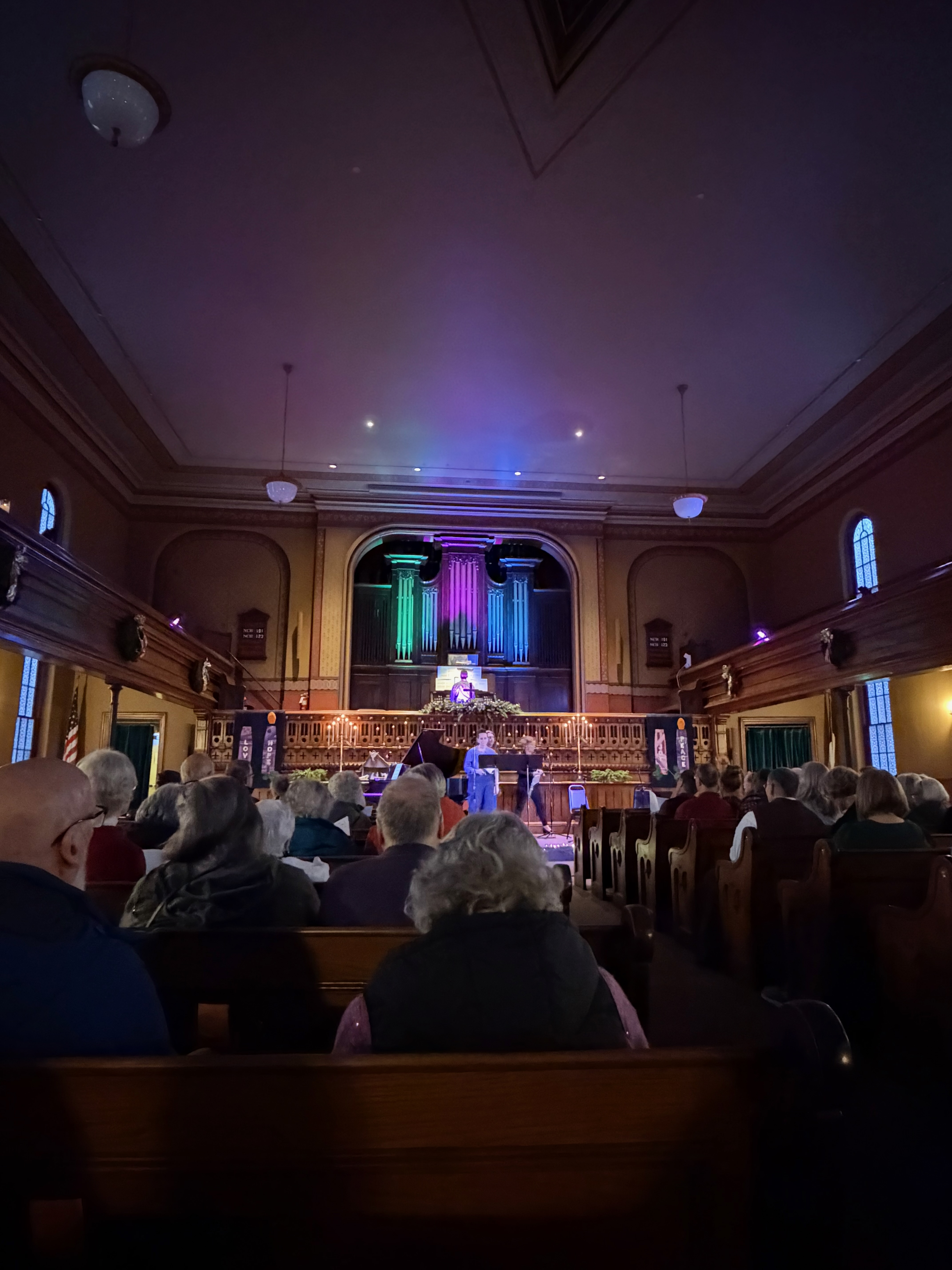
Interior, 2025

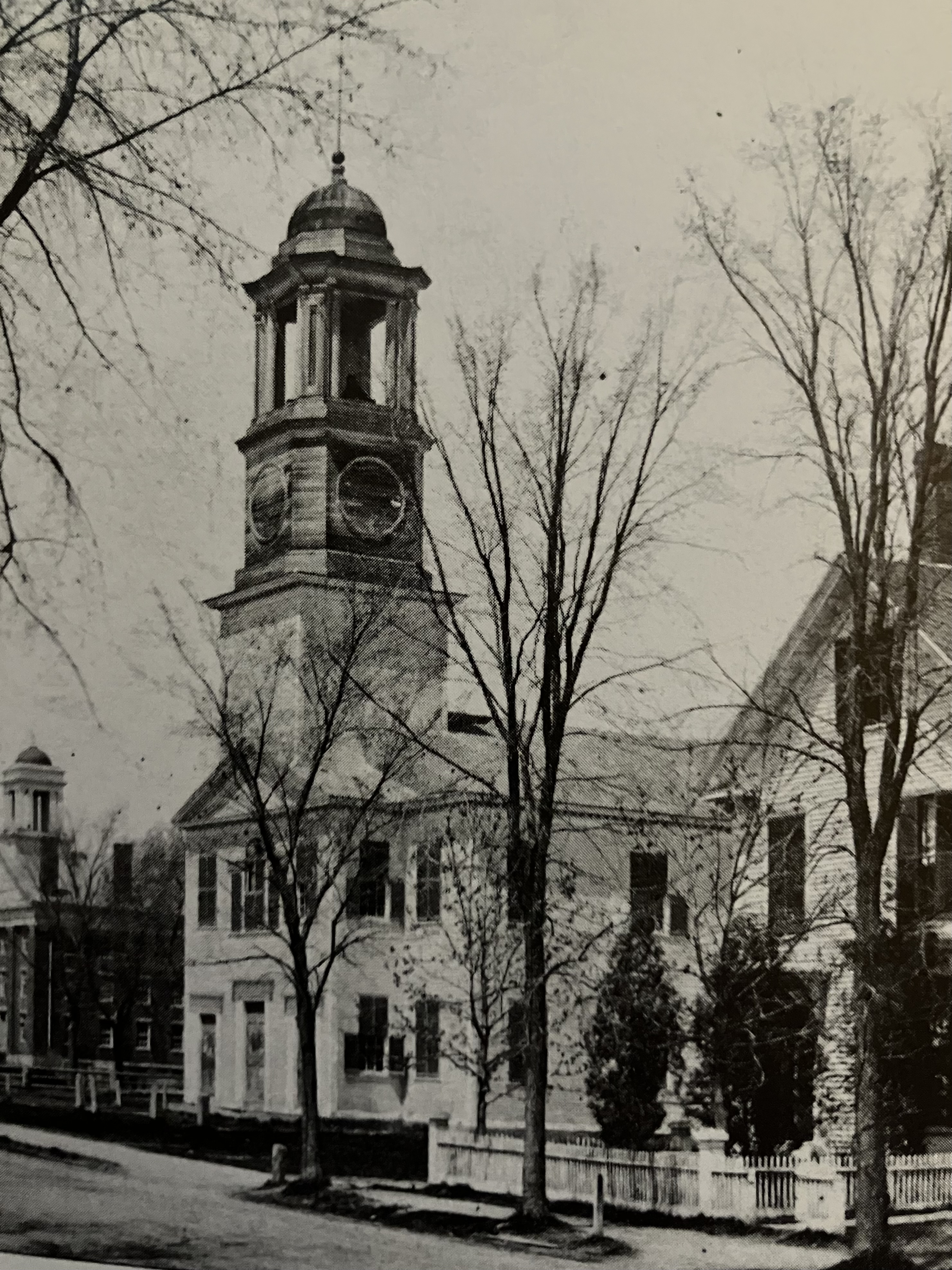
The Old Sloop in the first half of the 19th century

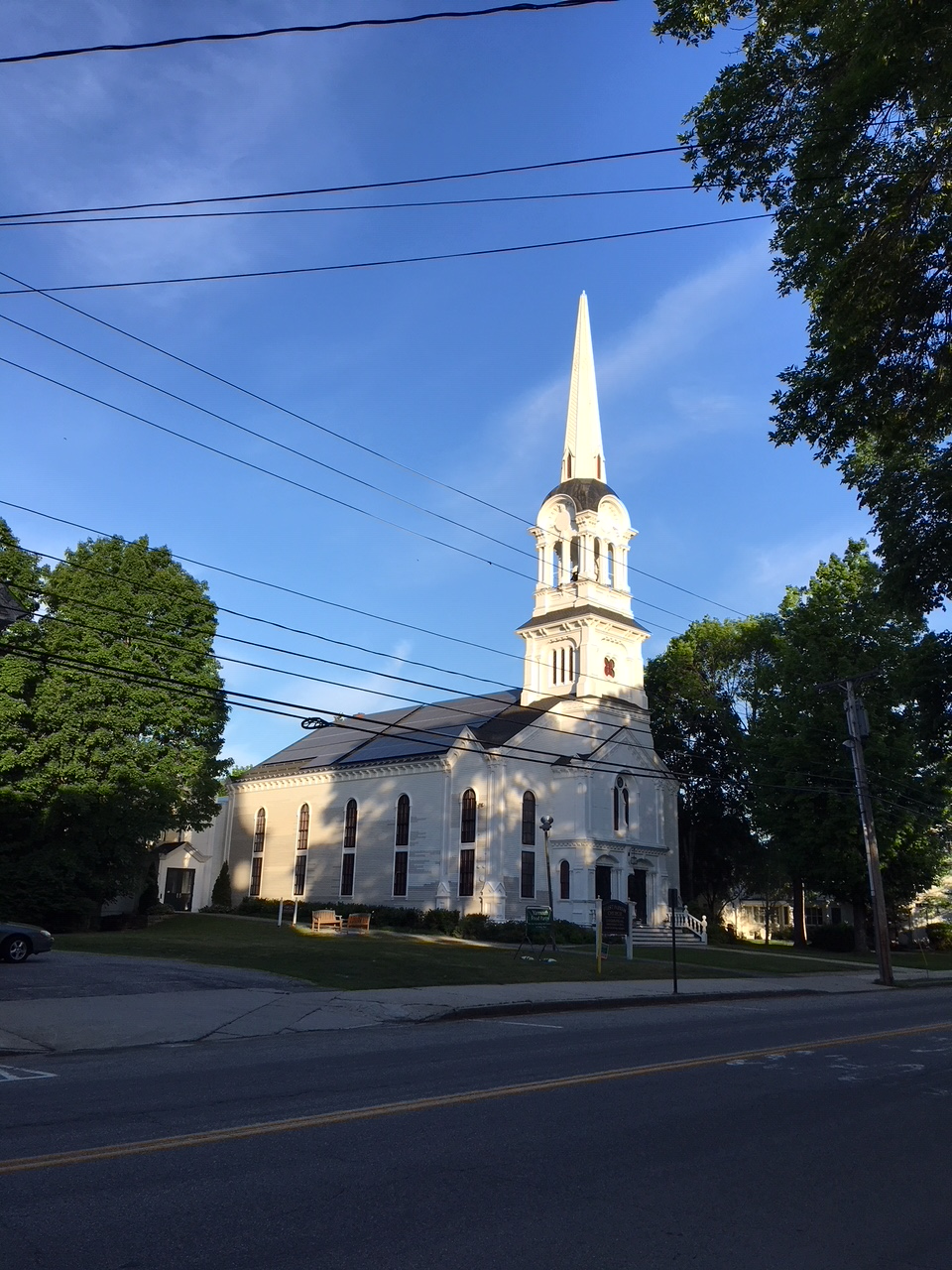
A view of the northern (front) and eastern facades of the church

== See also ==
- National Register of Historic Places listings in Cumberland County, Maine
