= North Yarmouth, Maine =

- Town
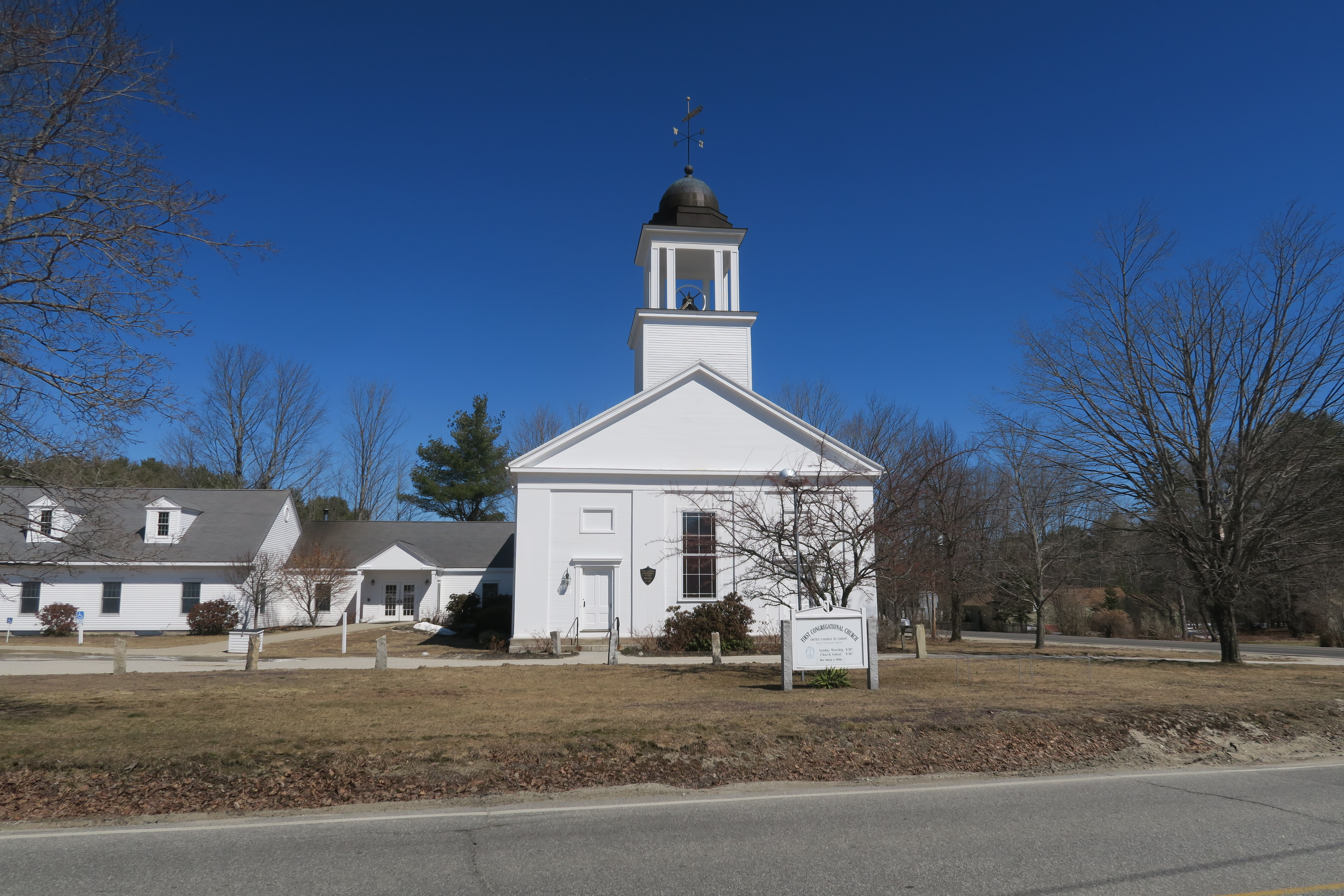
- First Congregational Church

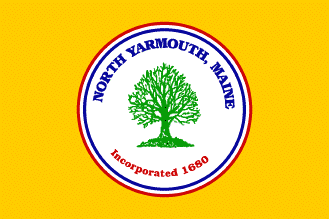
- Flag Seal
- Motto: "The Town Where Others Began"
- Location in Cumberland County and the state of Maine
- Coordinates: 43°51′28″N 70°14′25″W
- Country: United States
- State: Maine
- County: Cumberland
- Settled: 1636
- Incorporated: September 22, 1680
- Village: Walnut Hill

Area
  - Total: 21.41 sq mi (55.45 km^{2})
  - Land: 21.22 sq mi (54.96 km^{2})
  - Water: 0.19 sq mi (0.49 km^{2})
- Elevation: 230 ft (70 m)

Population (2020)
  - Total: 4,072
  - Density: 192/sq mi (74.1/km^{2})
- Time zone: UTC-5 (Eastern (EST))
  - Summer (DST): UTC-4 (EDT)
- ZIP code: 04097
- Area code: 207
- FIPS code: 23-53860
- GNIS feature ID: 0582642
- Website: www.northyarmouth.org

North Yarmouth is a town in Cumberland County, Maine, United States. The population was 4,072 at the 2020 United States census. It is part of the Portland–South Portland–Biddeford Metropolitan Statistical Area.

== Geography ==
According to the United States Census Bureau, the town has a total area of 21.41 square miles (55.45 km^{2}), of which 21.22 square miles (54.96 km^{2}) is land and 0.19 square miles (0.49 km^{2}) is water.

== History ==
The area embracing North Yarmouth, first settled in 1636, was abandoned twice before successful final settlement in 1713. In 1646, William Royall (c. 1595–1676) purchased a farm on the river that, since, has borne his name. John Cousins (c. 1596–1682), a few years previous, occupied a neck of land between branches of a stream and owned an island, both now bearing his name. These settlements were established in the vicinity, called by the Wabanakis, as "Wescustogo". Yarmouth originally constituted the eastern portion of North Yarmouth; the "North" in the name intended to differentiate it from Yarmouth, Massachusetts, on Cape Cod (Maine then being a part of Massachusetts). North Yarmouth was chartered on September 22, 1680, encompassing the area of the present Town of North Yarmouth and the future towns of Harpswell (until 1750), Freeport (until 1789), Pownal (until 1808, from Freeport), Cumberland (until 1821), and Yarmouth (until 1849).

In 1980, to coincide with the tricentennial celebration of the incorporation of the Town of North Yarmouth, a new printing of the William Hutchinson Rowe original 1937 book Ancient North Yarmouth and Yarmouth, Maine 1636–1936: A History was made.

=== First Congregational Church ===
First Congregational Church stands on Gray Road (Maine State Route 115) at its intersection with New Gloucester Road (Maine State Route 231). Built in 1839, one of its early ministers was Asa Cummings.

== Demographics ==
Historical population
Census	Pop.	Note	%±
1790	1,978		—
1800	2,599		31.4%
1810	3,295		26.8%
1820	3,679		11.7%
1830	2,666		−27.5%
1840	2,824		5.9%
1850	1,121		−60.3%
1860	1,076		−4.0%
1870	940		−12.6%
1880	827		−12.0%
1890	709		−14.3%
1900	642		−9.4%
1910	686		6.9%
1920	590		−14.0%
1930	569		−3.6%
1940	666		17.0%
1950	942		41.4%
1960	1,140		21.0%
1970	1,383		21.3%
1980	1,919		38.8%
1990	2,429		26.6%
2000	3,210		32.2%
2010	3,565		11.1%
2020	4,072		14.2%
U.S. Decennial Census

=== 2000 census ===
As of the census of 2000, there were 3,210 people, 1,118 households, and 924 families living in the town. The population density was 151.9 inhabitants per square mile (58.6/km^{2}). There were 1,142 housing units at an average density of 54.0 per square mile (20.8/km^{2}). The racial makeup of the town was 98.66% White, 0.09% African American, 0.09% Native American, 0.59% Asian, 0.12% from other races, and 0.44% from two or more races. Hispanic or Latino of any race were 0.47% of the population.

There were 1,118 households, out of which 45.1% had children under the age of 18 living with them, 72.2% were married couples living together, 7.7% had a female householder with no husband present, and 17.3% were non-families. 12.3% of all households were made up of individuals, and 3.9% had someone living alone who was 65 years of age or older. The average household size was 2.87 and the average family size was 3.13.

In the town, the population was spread out, with 30.2% under the age of 18, 3.6% from 18 to 24, 33.5% from 25 to 44, 25.0% from 45 to 64, and 7.6% who were 65 years of age or older. The median age was 38 years. For every 100 females, there were 95.9 males. For every 100 females age 18 and over, there were 94.4 males.

The median income for a household in the town was $60,850, and the median income for a family was $65,000. Males had a median income of $42,986 versus $29,179 for females. The per capita income for the town was $25,180. About 0.6% of families and 2.3% of the population were below the poverty line, including 1.2% of those under age 18 and 3.3% of those age 65 or over.

=== 2010 census ===
As of the census of 2010, there were 3,565 people, 1,297 households, and 1,036 families living in the town. The population density was 168.0 inhabitants per square mile (64.9/km^{2}). There were 1,354 housing units at an average density of 63.8 per square mile (24.6/km^{2}). The racial makeup of the town was 97.4% White, 0.2% African American, 0.1% Native American, 1.0% Asian, 0.3% from other races, and 1.1% from two or more races. Hispanic or Latino of any race were 0.9% of the population.

There were 1,297 households, of which 42.4% had children under the age of 18 living with them, 68.2% were married couples living together, 7.9% had a female householder with no husband present, 3.8% had a male householder with no wife present, and 20.1% were non-families. 14.9% of all households were made up of individuals, and 6.4% had someone living alone who was 65 years of age or older. The average household size was 2.74 and the average family size was 3.05.

The median age in the town was 42.5 years. 26.6% of residents were under the age of 18; 5.5% were between the ages of 18 and 24; 22.7% were from 25 to 44; 34.7% were from 45 to 64; and 10.4% were 65 years of age or older. The gender makeup of the town was 48.4% male and 51.6% female.

== Amenities ==
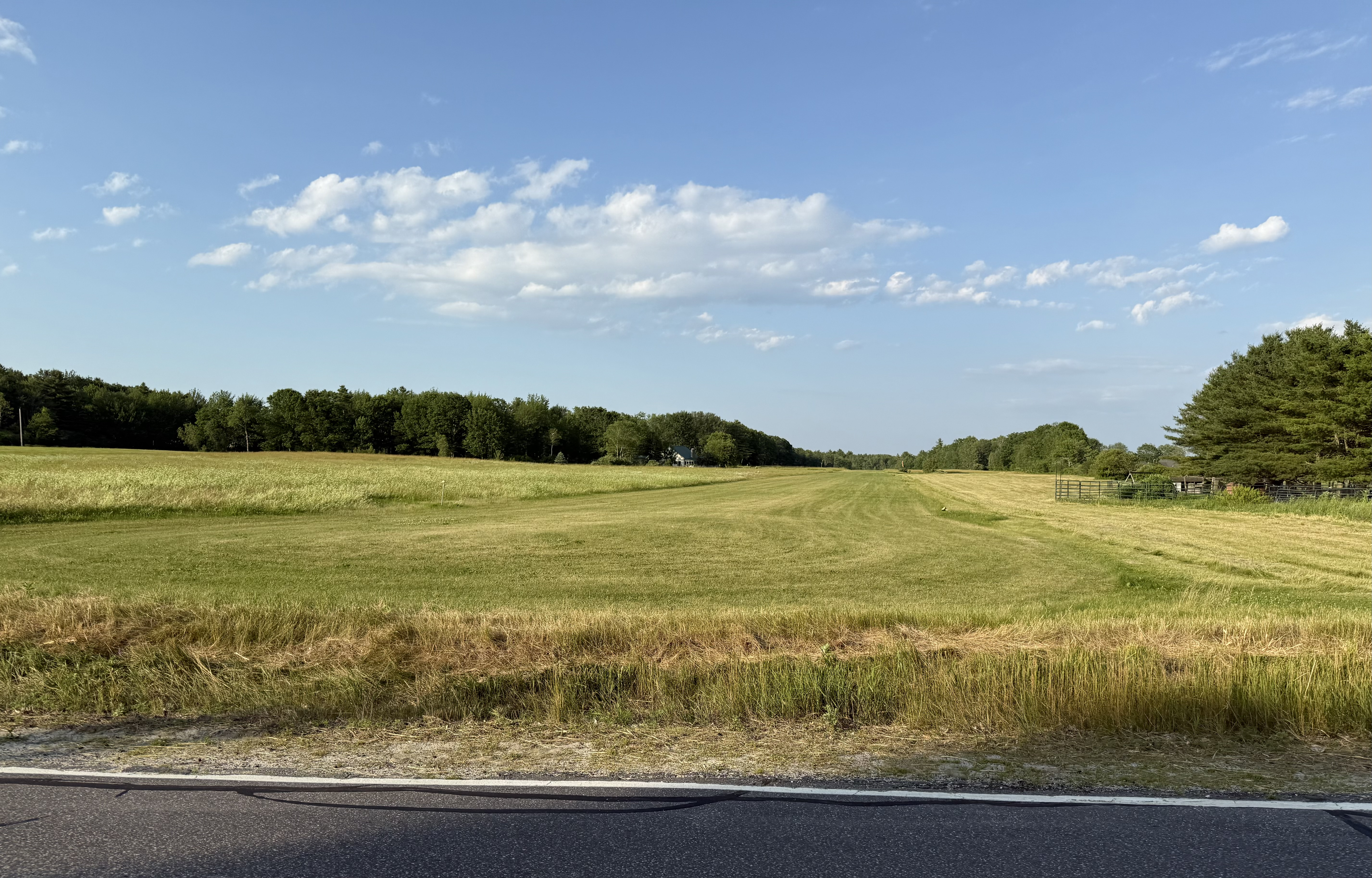
Eagle Field airstrip

The privately owned, unattended Eagle Field airstrip is located between Walnut Hill Road and Prince Well Road, just north of Toots Ice Cream. Its FAA identifier is 15ME, and it was activated in 2006. Its grass runways are numbered 7 and 25, and its height above sea level is 150 feet. Its area control center is Boston Center, while its flight service station is Bangor.

Toddy Brook Golf Course (18 holes, par 71) is located at the corner of Sligo Road and Memorial Highway (State Route 9).

== Notable people ==
- Rufus Anderson, author, missionary
- Sylvanus Blanchard, sea captain
- Edward Brooks, minister
- Eleazer Burbank, physician and state legislator
- Augustus W. Corliss, writer and historian
- John Cousins, early settler
- Samuel Drinkwater, sea captain
- Tristram Gilman, minister
- Anne P. Graham, politician
- Jonathan Greeley, sea captain
- Elijah Dix Green, merchant
- William Hawes, mill owner and state legislator
- Gad Hitchcock, physician
- Levi Marston, sea captain
- Ammi Ruhamah Mitchell, physician and state legislator
- Jacob Mitchell, deacon
- James Parker, innkeeper
- Cushing Prince, politician
- Cushing Prince Jr., sea captain
- Harlan Prince, sea captain
- Paul Prince, patriot
- Reuben Prince, sea captain
- William Royall, early settler
- Edward Russell, Maine secretary of state, brigadier general
- Lyman Fessenden Walker, shipbuilder
