= Pleasant Street (Yarmouth, Maine) =

Prominent street in Yarmouth, Maine

Coordinates: 43.790572°N 70.176809°W

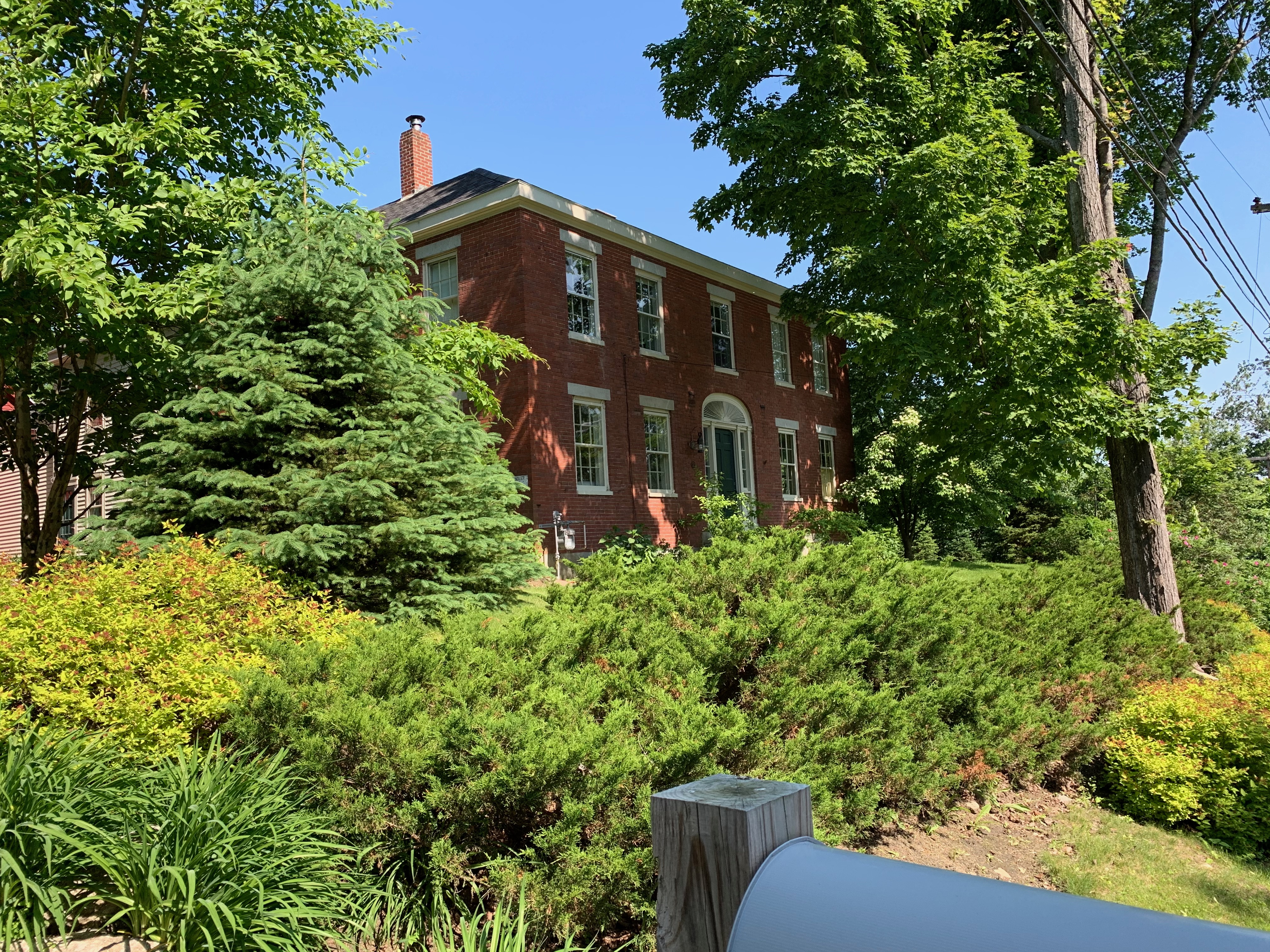
- 51 Pleasant Street has been the home of several notable Yarmouth residents, including master shipwright Giles Loring
- Interactive map of Pleasant Street
- Length: 0.64 mi (1.03 km)
- Location: Yarmouth, Maine, U.S.
- Northern end: Lafayette Street
- Southern end: Lafayette Street

Construction
- Completion: 18th century or earlier

Pleasant Street is a historic street in Yarmouth, Maine, United States. It was formerly part of the Atlantic Highway (or New England Route 1), a precursor to U.S. Route 1. It connects to Lafayette Street, part of today's Maine State Route 88, at Pleasant Street’s southern and northern ends. It has existed since at least 1761, which is when a milestone was placed on the street, on the order of Benjamin Franklin, due to its being on the King's Highway, to denote its distance from Boston, Massachusetts. As part of his duties, Franklin conducted inspections of the roads that were used for delivering mail. One method of charging for mail service was by mileage, so Franklin invented an odometer to measure mileage more accurately. The King's Highway, as a result, morphed into the Post Road.

In the mid-19th century, the street became the home of several notable sea captains, due to its proximity to Yarmouth Harbor at the northern end of the street. It is here that the road's elevation drops around 65 feet (from 75 feet (23 m) to 10 feet (3.0 m)) over the course of around 500 feet (150 m).

A 2021 Historic Preservation Advisory Ordinance identified ten Local Historic Landmarks, three Historic Districts and three Historic Objects. Many are located in the Gilman Road and Pleasant Street areas, which leads to the possibility of it being a future historic district.

== History ==
The street was the access road to the wharves before the Lafayette Street hill was paved. Several people pertinent to the shipbuilding industry lived on Pleasant Street, including Captain William Gooding. The above-ground basement level of number 51 was used as a paymaster's office for the nearby shipyards.

Prior to the construction of the Lafayette Street hill in early 19th century, Smith Street, a cross street on the plateau section of Pleasant Street, led east into the area now occupied by Riverside Cemetery in an uninterrupted form. State Route 88 now bisects it.

Pleasant Street was also part of the northern extension of the King's Highway that ran between Charleston, South Carolina and Boston, Massachusetts, laid out between 1650 and 1735.

Trolley cars of the Portland and Yarmouth Electric Railway used to run, every fifteen minutes, from Portland, through Falmouth Foreside, up and down Pleasant Street and onto Main Street between 1898 and 1933, when the advent of the automobile made rail travel a less convenient option. A shed for passengers awaiting the trolley cars stood at the southern end of the street. It was called Rock Ledge Station, but was nicknamed Rubberneck due to the need for those inside the shed to crane their necks out of the shed's door to look sharply right for an approaching trolley car.

Jacob Mitchell's Tavern stood on Pleasant Street until 1923. Having fallen into disrepair, it was burned down.

== Architecture ==
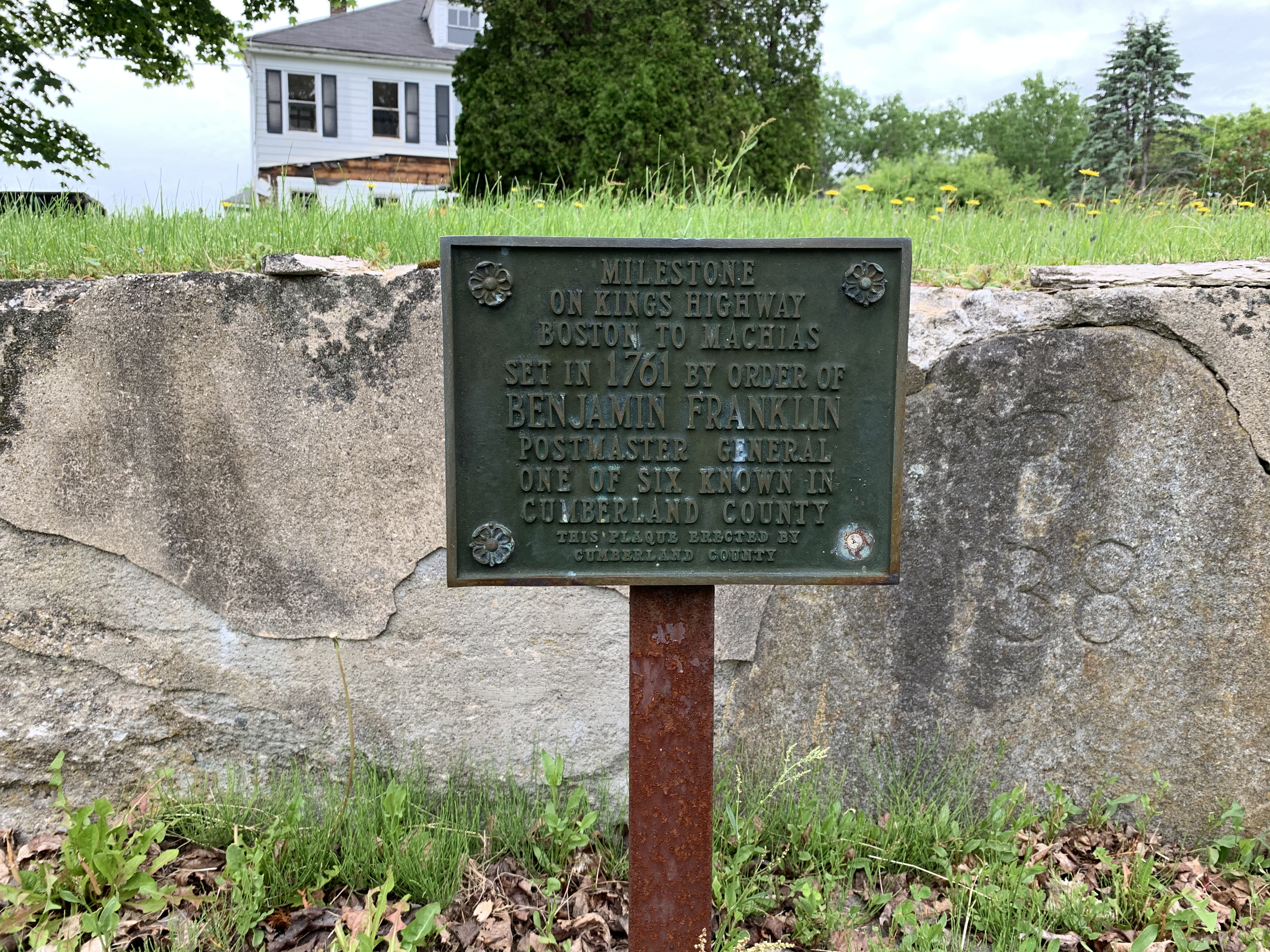
A milestone of the Boston to Machias "King's Highway" route in front of 155 Pleasant Street. Now incorporated into a wall, it is engraved with "B 138," to denote its distance of 138 miles from Boston

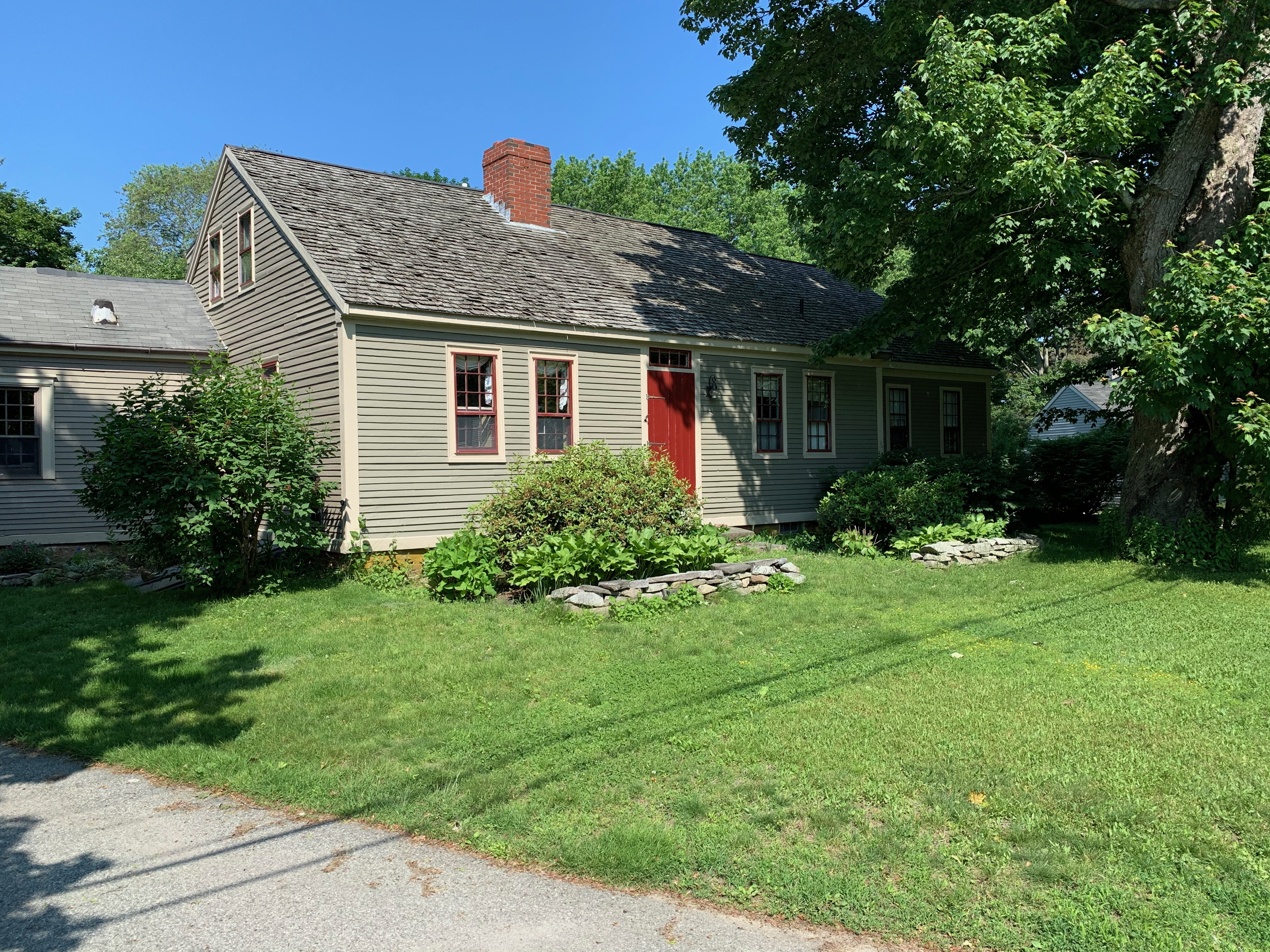
71 Pleasant Street was built in 1750 and has its "integrity intact", according to a survey co-ordinator

Shipbuilder Giles Loring lived at the 1840-built number 35.

The original owner of number 44, which was built in 1860, was a ship captain.

Daniel M. Stubbs built the circa-1859 number 50. It was purchased in 1864 by photographer Charles Gustavus Gooding.

Several notable members of Yarmouth's seafaring past have lived in the brick number 51, which was built in 1831: mariner Enos Chandler, master shipwright Lyman Fessenden Walker and Giles Loring.

William Gooding Jr. built number 68 around 1846. It remained in the family for 103 years.

The cape at number 71 was built in 1750.

Number 85's original owner, in 1848, was yeoman and shipbuilder Henry Hutchins.

Shipbuilder William Gooding lived across the street at the 1843-constructed number 86.

Number 97, built in 1846, is a well-preserved Greek Revival. Its door surround, entablatures at the windows, pilasters and cornice make it eligible for listing.

Built in 1730, 112 Pleasant Street is believed to be one of the oldest homes in Yarmouth.

The cape at number 125 is a well-preserved, high-style Greek Revival with details including an entry surround with a tablet and sidelights. It also has an attached barn.

Penelope Seabury lived in the cape at number 135, which dates from 1830.

The home at 166, at the inside of the curve down to Lafayette Street, is believed to have been built around 1844. Meanwhile, number 242, the final home on the right before Lafayette Street, was built in 1836.

Today's 1 Main Street, at the First Falls, was originally located on Pleasant Street.

=== Gooding's End ===
At the apex of the Pleasant Street corner is Gooding's End, named for the family involved in shipbuilding down at the harbor.

Henry Gooding lived at number 7, built in 1874.

Number 25, built in 1840, was originally part of the Royal River Cabins on Route 88. It is believed this cabin was the one Eleanor Roosevelt stayed in when in Yarmouth in the 1940s.
