= Herbert Merrill =

Herbert Merrill may refer to:

- Herbert M. Merrill (1871–1956), American politician from New York
- Herbert A. Merrill (1855–1926), American dentist and field officer
