= Charles Chesley Springer =

American educator and politician (1851–1922)

Personal details
- Born: November 4, 1851 Livermore, Maine, U.S.
- Died: March 8, 1922 (aged 70) Boston, Massachusetts, U.S.
- Occupation: Educator and politician

Charles Chesley Springer (November 4, 1851 – March 8, 1922) was an American educator and politician from Maine. He was a member of the House of Representatives of the Maine Legislature.

== Early life ==
Springer was born in 1851 in Livermore, Maine, to George W. Springer and Olive T. Hill. He was their third child, after Mary and George, and was educated in the public schools of Yarmouth, Maine. He studied at North Yarmouth Academy (NYA), before graduating from Bowdoin College in 1874. He went on to study modern languages and political economy in Paris and at the University of Leipzig.

== Career ==
Upon returning to the United States from Europe, Springer became an instructor of modern languages at Bowdoin College for one year (1876 to 1877). After studying law, in 1879 he was elected a member of the House of Representatives of the Maine Legislature by the Town of Yarmouth.

In 1880, Springer was secretary of the Hale Investigating Committee, which was formed by Eugene Hale to examine the alleged attempt to falsify election ballots.

After becoming interested in the manufacturing process of pulp, he studied the sulphite process abroad. When he returned, in the mid-1880s, he was made treasurer of the American Sulphite Pulp Company of Boston, and was also involved with the city's Mount Tom Sulphite Pulp Company and the Russell Coal Company. He filed a patent for an improvement in pulp-digesters for paper-making in 1885.

== Later life ==
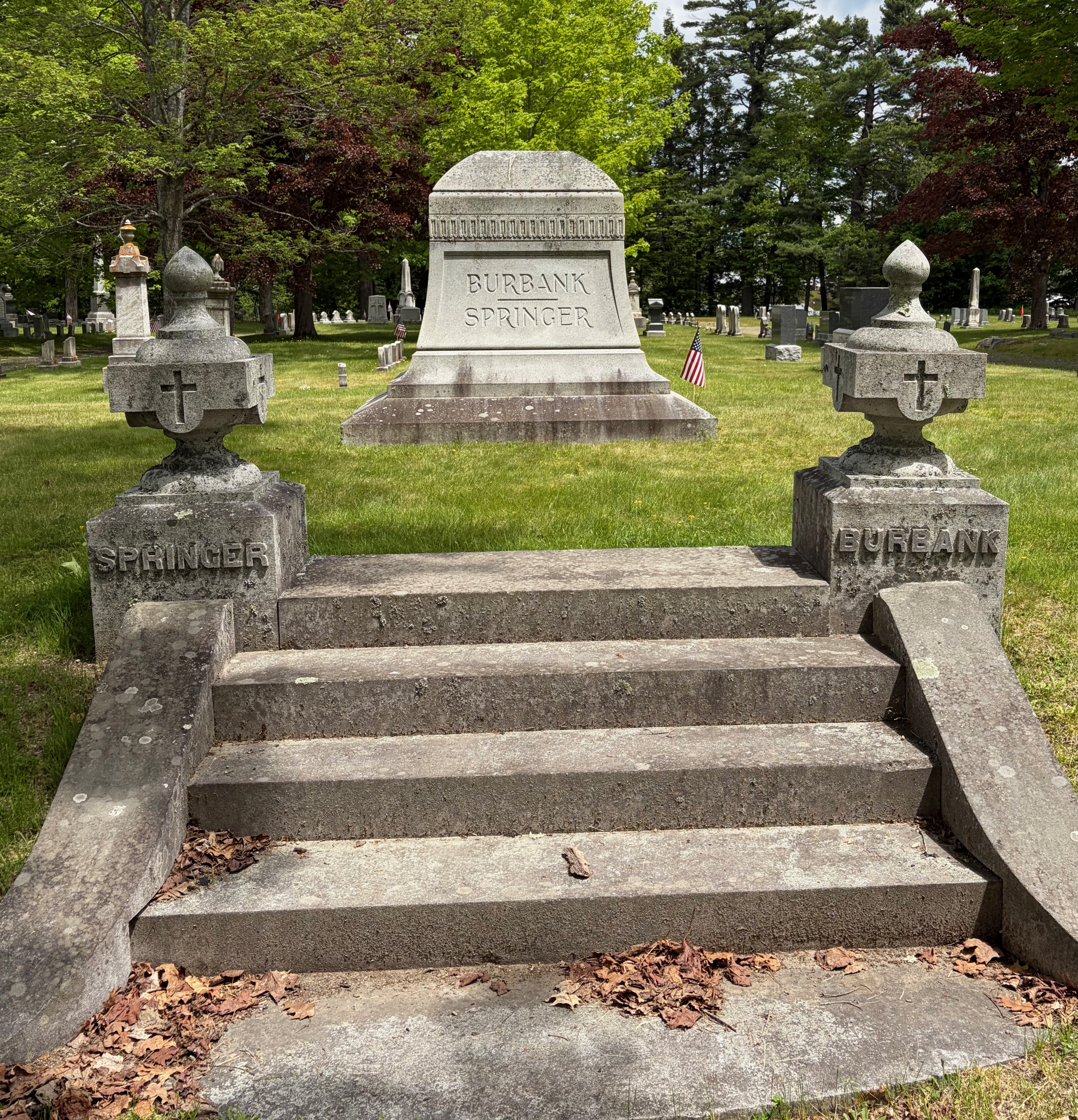
The Burbank–Springer marker at Riverside Cemetery in Yarmouth, Maine

Springer retired in 1915 and settled in Roxbury, Massachusetts.

== Death ==
Springer died in 1922, aged 70, at Boston's Hotel Vendome, where he had been living. He was interred in Riverside Cemetery in Yarmouth, in a shared plot with the family of Augustus Burbank, who was president of NYA while Springer was its principal.
