= Samuel York =

- Born: 1645; Durham, Massachusetts Bay Colony
- Died: March 17, 1718 (aged 72 or 73)
- Resting place: First Parish Burial Ground, Gloucester, Massachusetts, U.S.
- Spouse: Hannah York

Samuel York (or Samuel Yorke) (1645 – March 17, 1718) was a 17th-century settler of the New England Colonies. York Landing (or York Ledge), in Falmouth, Maine, is now named for him.

== Life and career ==
York was born in 1645, to Richard York and Elizabeth Graves, likely in Durham, Massachusetts Bay Colony. He was their second son, after John, who lived in North Yarmouth, in today's Maine, before moving south to Scarborough. His other siblings were Samuel, Elizabeth, Rachel, Benjamin and Grace.

In 1670, he purchased land in Pejepscot (today's Topsham, Maine), although the outbreak of King Philip's War, shortly thereafter, forced him to move to Gloucester, Massachusetts Bay Colony.

He returned north after peace was restored and settled in Falmouth. York Landing there now bears his name.

In 1730, in the depositions of John Lane and Nathaniel Wharf, it was testified that York owned a "lot of land near Mussel Cove in Casco Bay and built a house and possessed by virtue of a town grant more than fifty years ago." The location of York's home was recorded in the United States Coast Survey map.

== Personal life ==
York married Hannah, with whom he had three sons (Samuel, Benjamin and Richard) and three daughters (Hannah, Sarah and Elizabeth).

== Death ==
York died in 1718, aged 72 or 73. He is interred in the First Parish Burial Ground in Gloucester. His son, Richard, was buried there two months later, aged 28.
