= Portland and Yarmouth Electric Railway =

Former electric trolleycar service

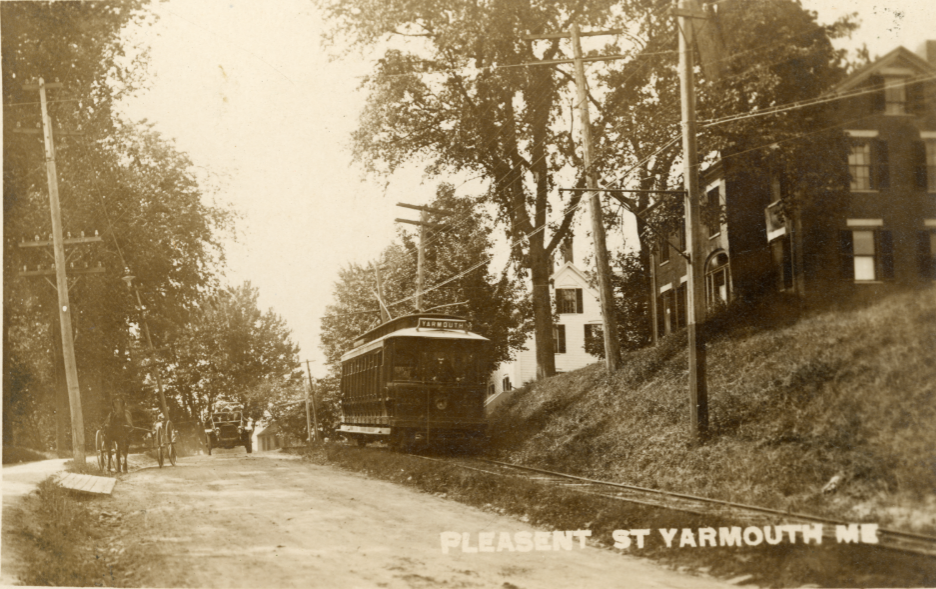
- A trolleycar about to descend from the crest of Pleasant Street into Yarmouth Harbor, c. 1900

Operation
- Locale: Portland to Yarmouth, Maine
- Open: August 2, 1898
- Close: 1933 (93 years ago)
- Status: Closed
- Routes: 1
- Owners: Portland and Yarmouth Electric Railway Company

Infrastructure
- Propulsion system: Electric

Statistics
- Route length: 12.4 miles (20.0 km)

Portland and Yarmouth Electric Railway was an electric trolleycar service that ran along the coast between Portland and Yarmouth, Maine, from 1898 and 1933. Described in 1901 as the "new electric road", Yarmouth was "now a closer neighbor [to Portland] than ever before" because of the railway's advent.

== History ==
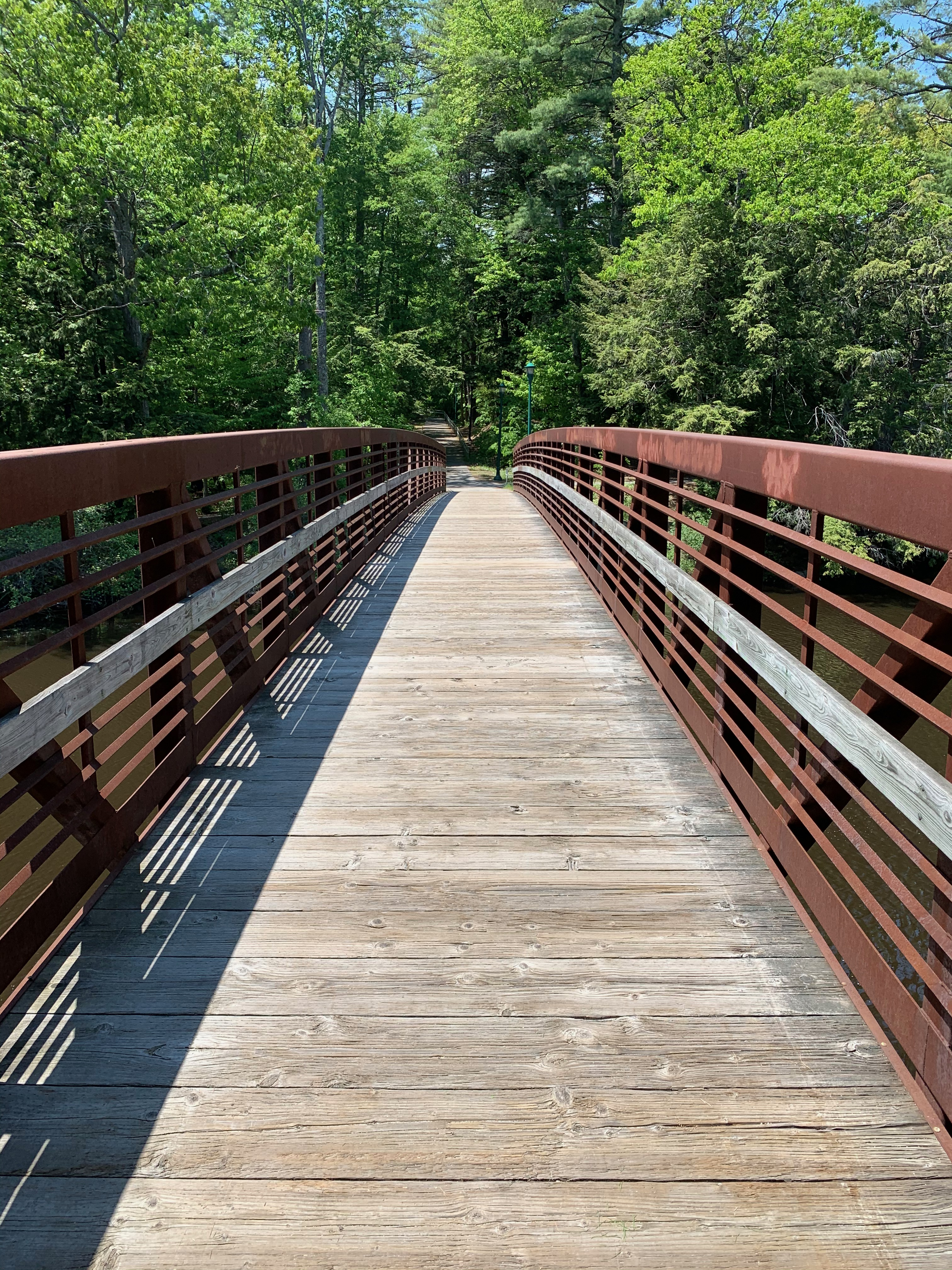
The bridge in Yarmouth's Royal River Park which was formerly used by the Portland and Brunswick Street Railway

Although the plan was chartered by a special act of the Maine Legislature on November 21, 1894, the railway company was not established until August 2, 1898. It was formed by twenty local individuals, including Lorenzo L. Shaw, Herbert Merrill and Seth L. Larrabee.

Its trolleycars ran every fifteen minutes for a one-hour journey from Portland, the state's largest city, to Yarmouth, a coastal town on Casco Bay's northern shores. After crossing a predecessor of today's Tukey's Bridge (the construction of which delayed the line's opening) and the second iteration of Martin's Point Bridge, its route north of Portland followed in parallel the Atlantic Highway (today's State Route 88) through Falmouth Foreside (stopping at Underwood Spring Park and its casino), then, at the former Westcustogo Inn, took a left onto Pleasant Street shortly after entering Yarmouth. It then descended 65 feet (20 m) into Yarmouth Harbor, before turning sharply to climb around 80 feet (24 m) Marina Road up to the village's Main Street.

At Yarmouth, passengers could alight and board a Portland and Brunswick Street Railway car to continue up the coast (via Casco Castle in South Freeport). In 1906, after an agreement between the two lines, a bridge was built over the Royal River in today's Royal River Park, connecting the Brunswick and Portland trolleys at the Grand Trunk depot in town. The tracks ran down what is today's walkers' path to the Rowe School. The pedestrian bridge in the park is built on old abutments for a trolley line which ran between Yarmouth and Freeport between 1906 and 1933.

The former express car No. 3, a "root" scraper, was used to clear snow from the tracks.

== Closure ==
The company liquidated in 1933, after the advent of the automobile made rail travel a less convenient option.
