= John H. Staples =

- Born: May 2, 1920; Bryn Mawr, Pennsylvania, U.S.
- Died: January 21, 2013 (aged 92); Yarmouth, Maine, U.S.
- Resting place: Riverside Cemetery, Yarmouth, Maine, U.S.
- Spouse: Barbara Jewett Nealley (1949–2013; his death)
- Parent(s): John C. Staples; Mary H. Staples

John H. Staples (May 2, 1920 – January 21, 2013) was a United States Army veteran who was awarded four Purple Hearts and three Silver Stars.

== Early life ==
Staples was born in Bryn Mawr, Pennsylvania, to Philip C. and Mary H. Staples. He was a tenth-generation descendant of Peter Staples, an English colonist who settled in Kittery, Massachusetts Bay Colony, in 1670.

== Military career ==
He attended Haverford School and the University of North Carolina at Chapel Hill. In 1940, aged 20, he left school to enrol in military service as a horse soldier in the 104th Cavalry Regiment of the Pennsylvania National Guard.

In 1942, after the Japanese attack on Pearl Harbor, Staples was commissioned as first lieutenant of the Reconnaissance Battalion of the 3rd Armored Division. He was stationed at Fort Polk, Louisiana.

In the wake of the assault on Omaha Beach, in June 1944, his division landed in Normandy, before moving across northern France and Belgium to the German frontier. He was wounded in action four times, including at the Battle of the Bulge. It was during this period that he was awarded four Purple Hearts and three Silver Stars.

He was evacuated to England in January 1945, before sailing to Norfolk, Virginia, on a hospital ship. Upon arrival, he was treated for an eye injury at Walter Reed Army Medical Center.

Staples returned to duty, and was stationed on Catalina Island, off the California coast.

== Return to civilian life ==
Staples completed his interrupted studies at the University of Pennsylvania in 1945.

In the spring of 1948, he relocated to Bangor, Maine, where he began working in the woodlands department of the Great Northern Paper Company. He moved again, shortly thereafter, to Millinocket, having accepted a role as superintendent of the company's West Branch District. He remained with the company until 1980, when he retired.

== Personal life ==
In September 1949, Staples married Barbara Jewett Nealley.

== Death ==
Staples died in 2013, aged 92. He was interred in Riverside Cemetery in Yarmouth, Maine. His widow survived him by eight years, and was buried beside him.
