= Underwood Spring Park =

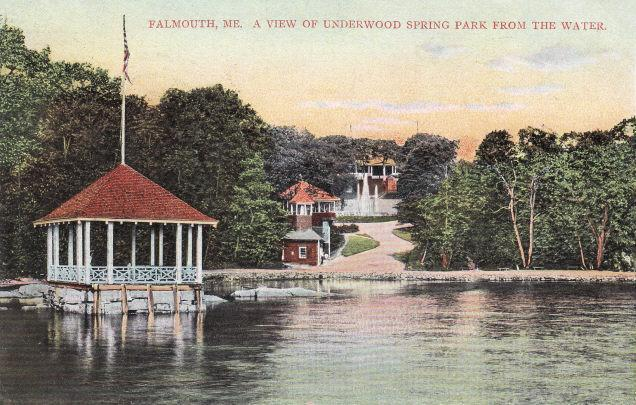
- Underwood Spring Park in 1906

- Location within the United States Location within Maine
- Interactive map of Underwood Spring Park
- Location: Falmouth Foreside, Maine, U.S.; 43.7365638°N 70.202902°W
- Opened: July 18, 1899
- Closed: 1907 (119 years ago)
- Signature attractions: Open-air theater, casino
- Owner: Portland and Yarmouth Electric Railway Company

Underwood Spring Park was a 19th- and 20th-century pleasure resort overlooking Casco Bay in Falmouth Foreside, Maine, United States. Containing an open-air theater, a casino and a gazebo, it was a popular gathering spot serviced by the trolley cars of the Portland and Yarmouth Electric Railway. The Portland and Yarmouth Electric Railway Company opened the park, located to north of the town landing, on July 18, 1899, to promote the line's service to and from Portland, Maine's largest city, every fifteen minutes. A looped spur off the main line was built the month following the resort's completion to facilitate the ease of passengers' arrivals.

The theater, which was managed by Edward A. Newman, burned down in 1907 and was not rebuilt. The park subsequently closed.

The Underwood name is still in use in the vicinity, including Underwood Park and the adjacent Underwood Springs Forest Preserve, both on the inland side of State Route 88.

== See also ==
- York Landing, Maine – located nearby
