= Alfred T. Small =

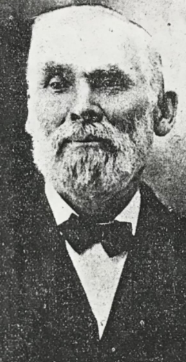
- Small pictured around 1900
- Born: July 16, 1826
- Died: December 25, 1906 (aged 80); Yarmouth, Maine, U.S.
- Resting place: Riverside Cemetery, Yarmouth, Maine, U.S.
- Occupation: Sea captain

Alfred T. Small (July 16, 1826 – December 25, 1906) was an American sea captain from Maine. He was one of the last "old-time shipmasters" of square-rigged ships, and he sailed around the world four times. He was also shipwrecked on six occasions.

== Life and career ==
Small was born on July 16, 1826, to Daniel Small (1794–1881) and Joanna E. Soule (1795–1867), daughter of Barnabas Soule and Jenny Dennison. His parents married on January 12, 1815.

He first went to sea as a fifteen-year-old, then became a cabin boy and, finally, captain, after the original captain abandoned ship.

He married twice: to Harriet in 1878, firstly, then, upon her death in 1873, to Abbie. He had two known children with his second wife: Arthur (born 1879) and Helen (1884).

While in Australia, Small's crew mutinied, but Small "single-handedly put the two ringleaders in irons."

In the late 19th century, Small reluctantly gave an interview, titled "Tales of the Sea" to the Lewiston Journal about his experiences. "I never like to talk about my sea experiences," he said. "I have seen old sailors and soldiers tell exaggerated stories until they came to believe them themselves, and I am not hunting for that kind of reputation." He revealed he had sailed eight major voyages on as many vessels: The Don Juan, Glen, Georgia, Occident, Souter Johnny, Lafayette, Suliote and the Tam O'Shanter. His voyage on the Lafayette occurred during the American Civil War. On October 20, 1862, it was attacked by the CSS Alabama. He and his crew were captured but they were "treated quite kindly and released fairly quickly."

In 1854, the Georgia was shipwrecked en route to Boston after the vessel sprang a leak. They were rescued by the Rosina, an English ship, and taken to Quebec.

After retiring, Small became a selectman in Yarmouth, Maine, and a student of the town's history. He was also a co-founder of Yarmouth Water Company, along with Lorenzo L. Shaw, John H. Humphrey and George W. Hammond.

He was also manager of Yarmouth Manufacturing Company, located at the town's Lower Falls. Its officers were the aforementioned Shaw and Humphrey, while its treasurer was Walter B. Allen.

== Death ==
Small died at his home in Yarmouth on December 25, 1906, aged 80. He is interred in Yarmouth's Riverside Cemetery.

His obituary in the Six Towns Times said that he "will be missed in our village more than any other man."

=== Legacy ===
In 2007, Yarmouth historian Alan M. Hall published The Seafaring Adventures of Captain Alfred T. Small of Yarmouth, Maine.
