= Augustus Burbank =

American physician (1823–1895)

- Burbank around 1890
- Born: January 24, 1823; Poland, Maine, U.S.
- Died: June 27, 1895 (aged 72); Yarmouth, Maine, U.S.
- Resting place: Riverside Cemetery, Yarmouth, Maine, U.S.
- Education: North Yarmouth Academy; Bowdoin College (1843); Harvard Medical School (1847)
- Occupation: Physician
- Years active: 1847–1895; his death
- Spouse(s): Elizabeth R. Banks (1851–1869; her death); Alice N. Noyes (1871–1895; his death)

Augustus Hannibal Burbank (January 24, 1823 – June 27, 1895) was a 19th-century American physician. He was also treasurer of Yarmouth Aqueduct Company and an early president of North Yarmouth Academy.

== Early life ==
Burbank was born in Poland, Maine, in 1823, the only son of physician Eleazer Burbank and Sophronia Ricker.

He graduated from Bowdoin College in 1843 and studied medicine at Harvard University, receiving his MD in 1847.

== Career ==
Upon graduating, Burbank returned to Yarmouth, Maine, and entered general practice.

He was an early president of North Yarmouth Academy while Charles Chesley Springer was its principal. He was also a treasurer of Yarmouth Aqueduct Company.

== Personal life ==
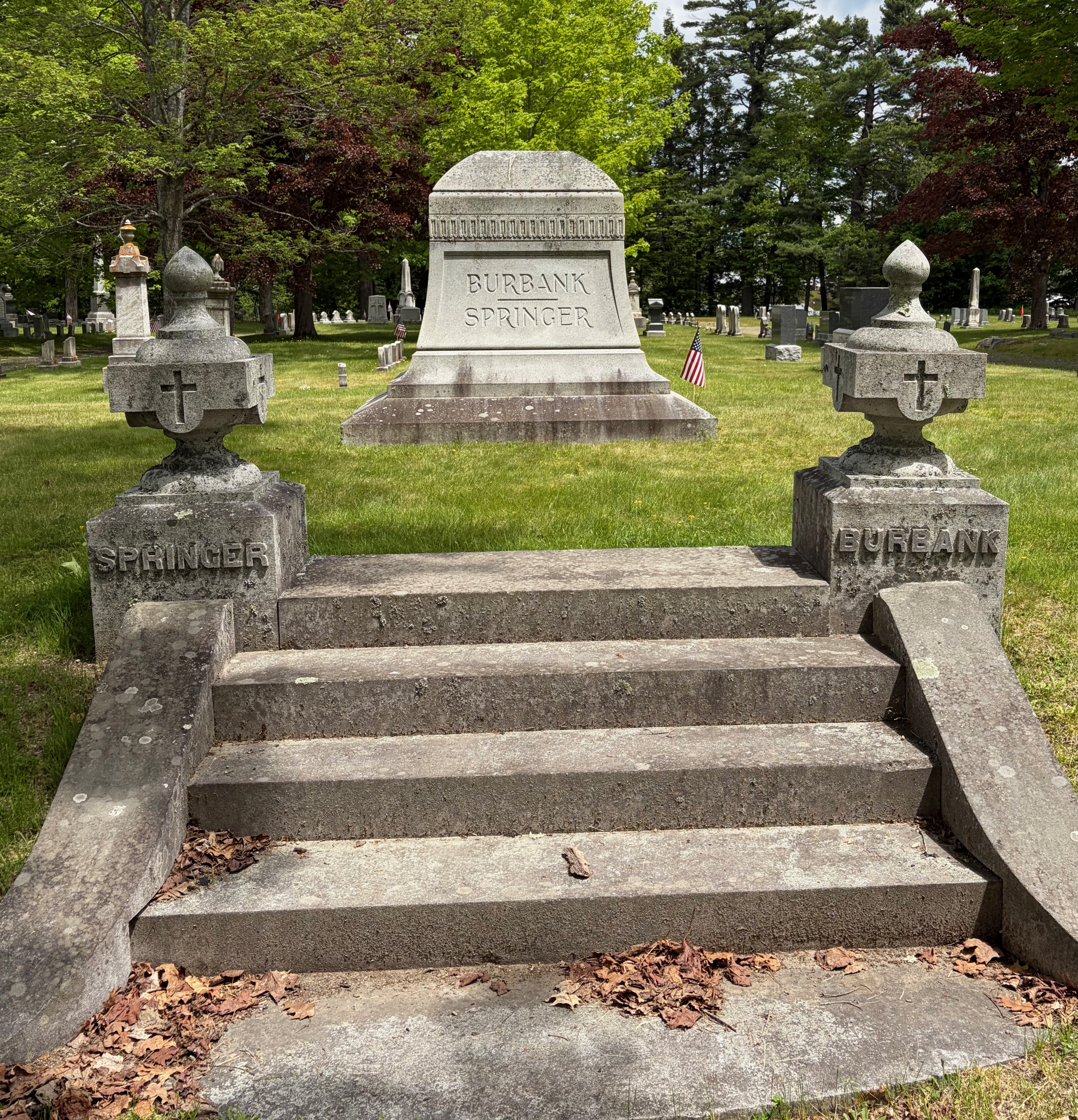
The Burbank–Springer marker at Riverside Cemetery in Yarmouth, Maine

On 25 November 1851, Burbank married Elizabeth Richardson Banks. They had one children: Annie (1852–1901). Elizabeth died in 1869, aged about 45.

On 16 December 1871, Burbank married Alice Noyes Thompson, with whom he had four children: Elizabeth (who died in infancy), Hugh Eleazer, Marjorie and Maurice Augustus.

He was a member of Yarmouth's First Parish Congregational Church and, professionally, the Maine Medical Association.

== Death ==
Burbank died, of heart disease, in 1895, aged 72. Three years later, Alice remarried, to Charles Torrey. Torrey died in 1918 while they were living in Plymouth, Massachusetts, after which Alice returned to Yarmouth, where she died in 1938, aged about 90. Burbank, his two wives and three of his four children are interred in the same plot in Yarmouth's Riverside Cemetery, a plot also shared with the family of Charles Chesley Springer. (Maurice Burbank had moved to Vancouver, where he died in 1969, aged 89. He was buried in the city's Mountain View Cemetery.)
