= Riverside Cemetery (Yarmouth, Maine) =

Cemetery in Yarmouth, Maine

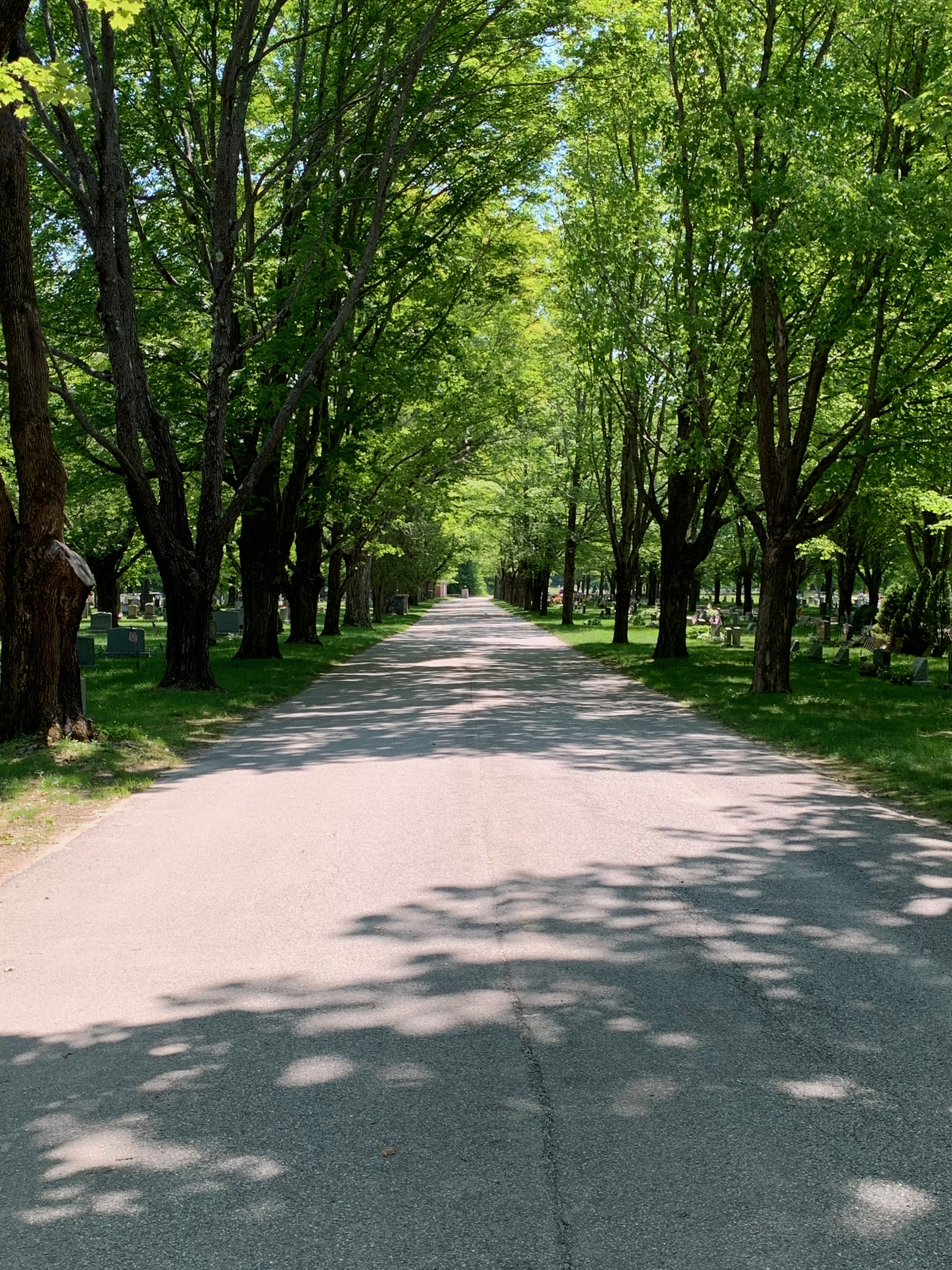
- Inside the gate, looking east. Holy Cross Cemetery is at the end of this driveway.
- Interactive map of Riverside Cemetery

Details
- Established: 1869 (157 years ago)
- Location: Smith Street; Yarmouth, Maine
- Country: United States
- Coordinates: 43.793422°N 70.171429°W
- Owned by: Town of Yarmouth
- Size: 12 acres (4.9 ha)
- Website: https://www.riversidecemeteryme.com/
- Find a Grave: Riverside Cemetery

Riverside Cemetery is a historic cemetery in Yarmouth, Maine, United States. Several prominent early business owners, sea captains and other townspeople are buried in the cemetery, including Leon Gorman, former president of L.L.Bean, which was founded by his grandfather, Leon Leonwood Bean.

Although it was founded in 1869, Riverside Cemetery has graves dating to the 1700s. The cemetery's oldest burials are on the northern (river) side; the more recent ones are to the south. A long driveway, which leads to another cemetery, separates the two sections.

Of all burials at the cemetery between 2018 and 2020, 65% were burials of cremated remains.

Holy Cross, a Catholic cemetery, is attached to Riverside to the east. It was established by Father Joseph Quinn, pastor of Sacred Heart Catholic Church, in the early 20th century. They both sit on a bluff about 50 feet (15 m) above Yarmouth Marina, immediately to the northwest.

The cemetery is managed and operated by Riverside Association Officers and Trustees.

== Notable burials ==
Listed chronologically:

- Dr. Eleazer Burbank (1793–1867), physician and state legislator
- Edward J. Stubbs (1833–1887), shipwright
- Henry Hutchins (1819–1889), shipwright
- Dr. Augustus Burbank (1823–1895), physician
- Harlan Prince (1837–1899), sea captain
- Joseph York Hodsdon (1836–1901), Maine state senator
- Alfred T. Small (1826–1906), sea captain
- Lorenzo L. Shaw (1828–1907), businessman
- James M. Bates (1827–1911), physician
- Frank L. Oakes (1859–1912), sea captain
- Lyman Fessenden Walker (1836–1920), shipbuilder
- Herbert A. Merrill (1855–1926), physician
- Charles Chandler Oakes (1856–1934), sea captain and Frank's older brother
- William Hutchinson Rowe (1882–1955), town historian and author
- Frank Knight (1908–2012), tree warden of "Herbie"
- John H. Staples (1920–2013), World War II veteran
- Leon Gorman (1934–2015), former president of L.L.Bean
- Carl Henry Winslow (1931–2020), former fire chief of Yarmouth
