= Atwell's Creek =

Atwell's Creek Folly Creek

Location
- Country: United States
- State: Maine
- Town: Yarmouth

Physical characteristics
- Mouth: Royal River
  - location: Yarmouth, Maine, U.S.
  - coordinates: 43.7898°N 70.1647°W

Atwell's Creek is a former watercourse in Yarmouth, Maine, United States. It is named for John Atwell, who married Elizabeth Maine, daughter of John and Elizabeth.

Flowing into the southern edge of Yarmouth harbor, between today's Holy Cross Cemetery and Larrabee's Landing, it was formerly an important access point to the mainland. It was used from the early 18th century to power various mills, the first being Massachusetts native Gilbert Winslow's sawmill in 1720. The creek received its nickname of Folly's Creek at this time, because Winslow's venture was expected by many people to fail, but it proved to be "a profitable concern." The creek was "a considerable watercourse then"; now, though, it is nothing more than a tidal inlet.

John Atwell Jr., son of John Atwell, married Margaret Maxe in 1693. They later lived beside Atwell's Creek on its western side.
