= White's Cove =

- Cove
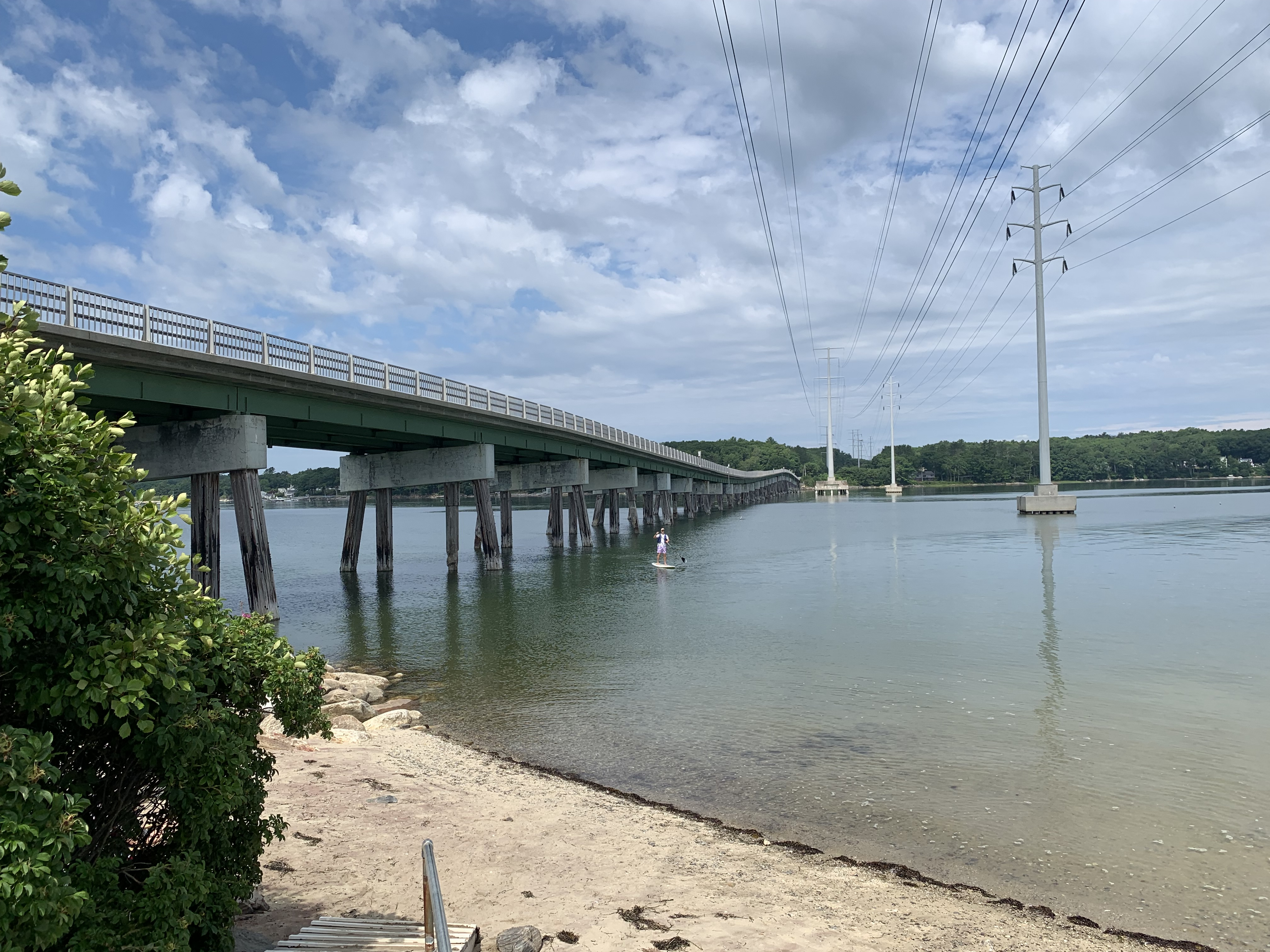
- The southern end of the cove, to the right of the Ellis C. Snodgrass Memorial Bridge here, viewed from Cousins Island
- Interactive map of White's Cove
- Coordinates: 43.78178731°N 70.1510043°W
- Country: United States
- State: Maine
- County: Cumberland
- Towns: Yarmouth
- Time zone: UTC-5 (Eastern (EST))
  - Summer (DST): UTC-4 (EDT)

White's Cove is a cove in Yarmouth, Maine, United States. It is around 0.53 miles (0.85 km) across at its widest point, in the inner waters of Casco Bay. It sits directly north of the Ellis C. Snodgrass Memorial Bridge. Whites Cove Road, off Gilman Road, leads to the cove.

== History ==
The cove is named for Nicholas White, who arrived in 1667. It was once the home of Captain Frank L. Oakes.
