= Edward J. Stubbs =

American merchant and shipwright (1833–1887)

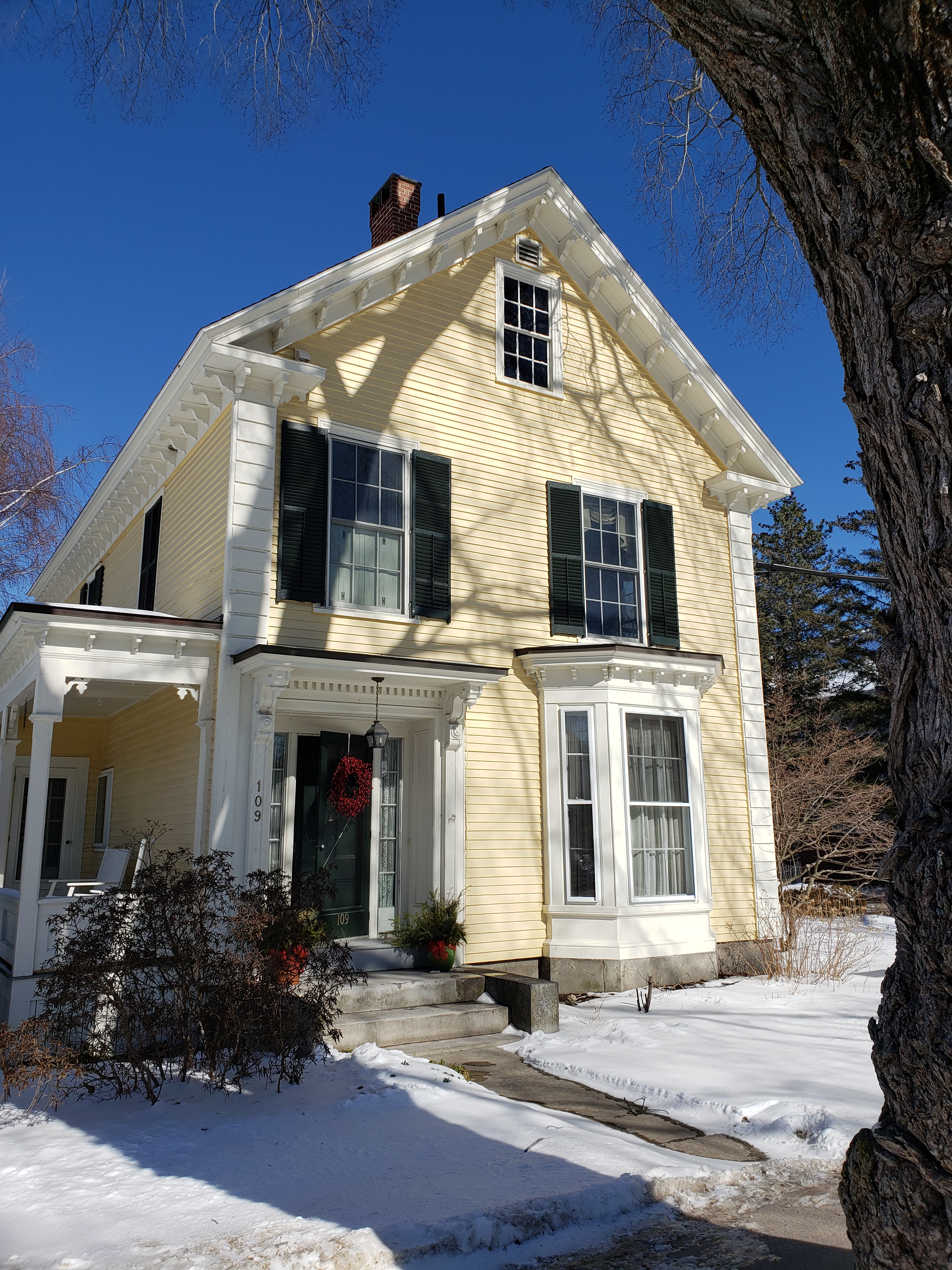
- Stubbs' former residence, today's 109 Main Street in Yarmouth, Maine. He had the house built in 1850
- Born: 1833
- Died: 1887 (aged 53 or 54)
- Resting place: Riverside Cemetery, Yarmouth, Maine, U.S.
- Occupations: Shipwright; Sea captain
- Known for: Shipbuilding
- Spouse: Helen A. Merrill (m. 1877)

Edward J. Stubbs (1833–1887) was an American merchant sea captain and a shipwright during a prolific period at Yarmouth Harbor in Maine. His shipyard was one of the four major ones during the town's peak years of 1850–1875.

== Career ==
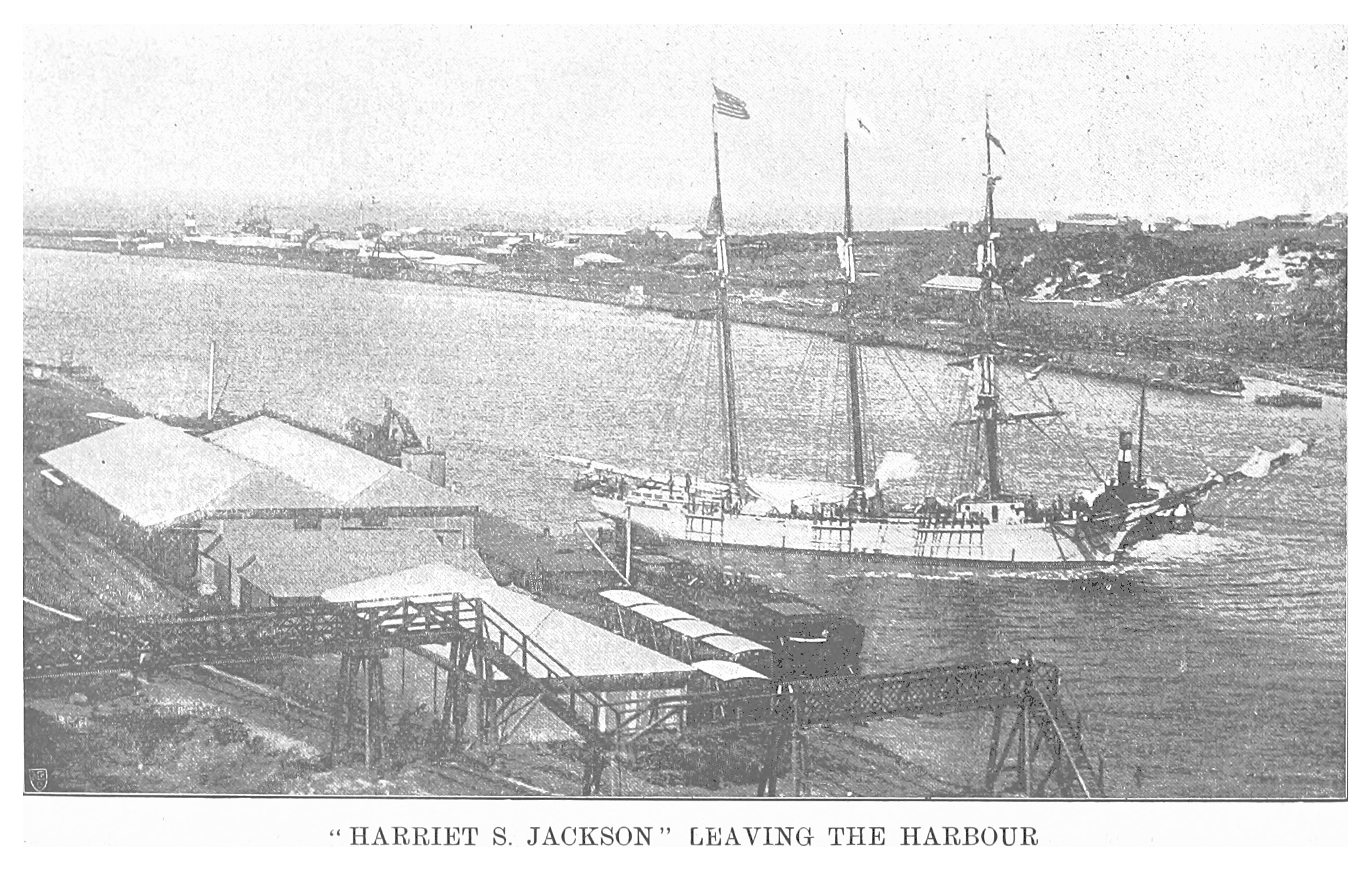
The Harriet S. Jackson leaving East London, South Africa, 1893

In 1851, Stubbs went into partnership with Henry Hutchins, forming Hutchins & Stubbs. They launched over 21 vessels at Yarmouth's harbor between 1866 and 1884, including the three-mast barkentine Harriet S. Jackson.

== Personal life ==
Stubbs married Helen A. Merrill on June 3, 1877. They had one known child: Harry L. Stubbs (1862–1931).

The Stubbses lived at today's 109 Main Street in Yarmouth, Maine, which he had constructed in 1850.

== Death ==
Stubbs died in 1887, aged 53 or 54. His wife survived him by 28 years. They are both buried in Yarmouth's Riverside Cemetery.
