= Henry Hutchins =

- Born: 1819
- Died: 1889 (aged 69 or 70)
- Resting place: Riverside Cemetery, Yarmouth, Maine, U.S.
- Occupation: Shipwright
- Known for: Shipbuilding

Henry Hutchins (1819–1889) was an American merchant shipwright during a prolific period at Yarmouth Harbor in Maine. His shipyard was one of the four major ones during the town's peak years, between 1850 and 1875.

== Career ==
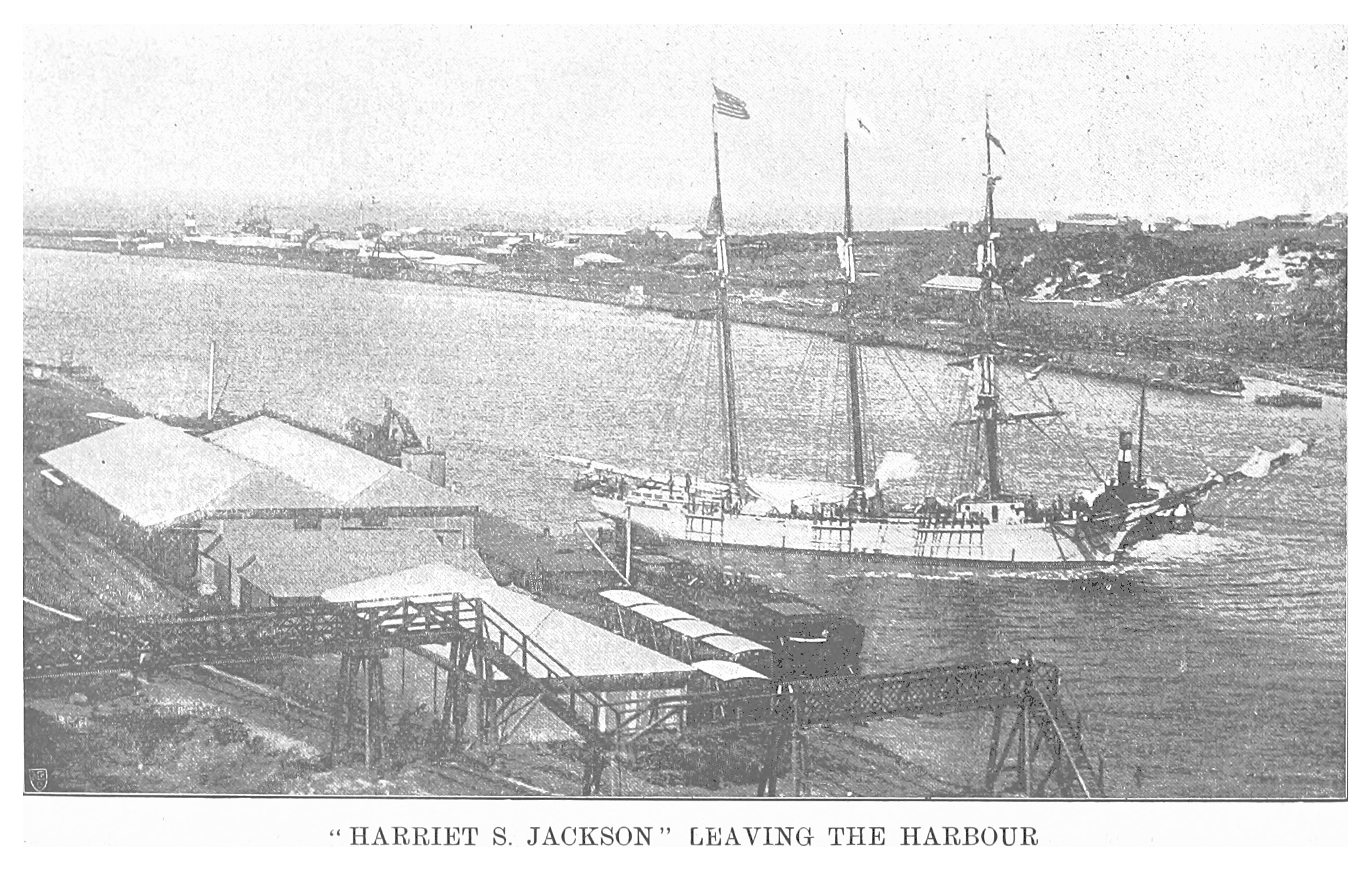
The Harriet S. Jackson leaving East London, South Africa, 1893

In 1851, Hutchins went into partnership with Edward J. Stubbs, forming Hutchins & Stubbs. They launched over 21 vessels at Yarmouth's harbor between 1866 and 1884, including the three-mast barkentine Harriet S. Jackson.

== Personal life ==
Hutchins was married to Harriet, with whom he lived at number 85 Pleasant Street (built in 1848) in Yarmouth. She died on Christmas Eve, 1869, aged 43. He remarried, to Tryphena (1830–1904).

A son, Henry Jr., died in 1869, aged 13.

== Death ==
Hutchins died in 1889, aged 69 or 70. His wife, Tryphena, survived him by fifteen years. He is interred, with both of his wives, in Yarmouth's Riverside Cemetery. They share a burial plot with the families of Captain Edwin W. Hill and Hermon Seabury.
