= Charles Chandler Oakes =

American sea captain (1856–1934)

- Born: 1856; Yarmouth, Maine, U.S.
- Died: December 4, 1934 (aged 77–78); Santa Ana, California, U.S.
- Resting place: Riverside Cemetery, Yarmouth, Maine, U.S.
- Occupations: Sea captain, author
- Spouse: Abbie Buxton (1863–1934; his death)

Charles Chandler Oakes (1856 – December 4, 1934) was an American sea captain of the late 19th and early 20th centuries, originally on windjammers and later on steamships. He was also an author: in 1933, he published his memoirs, written with his sea-faring wife. They were re-released in 2009 as Beckets & Hinges: Sea Tales of Old North Yarmouth, Maine.

== Life and career ==
Oakes was born in 1856 in Yarmouth, Maine, to Benjamin Oakes (1819–1901) and Mary Lovell (1819–1866). His older brother, Frank L. Oakes (1850–1912), was also a ship captain. A sister, Annetta, preceded Frank in birth, but died in infancy in 1849. A brother, Willie King, followed in 1853, but died the same year.

On March 14, 1888, he married Abbie Buxton (1863–1950), with whom he had one known child, daughter Mary Esther.

In 1898, the Oakses were anchored at Manila Bay when they received word of the destruction of the USS Maine in Havana Harbor. From Manila, they were witnesses to daily executions on shore as they prepared to discretely leave the harbor while Admiral George Dewey's Asiatic Squadron made its way across the China Sea to Hong Kong Harbor.

After several years as captain of sea-faring vessels, including the Yarmouth-built S. C. Blanchard, he became superintendent for Ward Steamship Lines.

In 1933, the Oakses self-published their seafaring journals under the titled The Old Sea Chest. The manuscript was split into two parts: part one being Abbie's "My Sea Life"; the second, Charles' "Beckets and Hinges." They were re-released in 2009 as Beckets & Hinges: Sea Tales of Old North Yarmouth, Maine.

Oakes was a member of the Masonic lodge in Yarmouth for 57 years.

== Death ==
Oakes died in 1934 in Santa Ana, California, to which he and his wife had moved around 1926 upon Charles' retirement. Aged 78, he was cremated in Santa Ana, then his ashes were interred in Yarmouth's Riverside Cemetery, in the same plot as his parents and three siblings. His wife, who survived him by sixteen years, was also buried in the plot.
