= Frank Knight (arborist) =

American arborist

- Knight in January 2010, at the felling of "Herbie"
- Born: Frank Addison Knight; October 17, 1908; Pownal, Maine, U.S.
- Died: May 14, 2012 (aged 103); Scarborough, Maine, U.S.
- Resting place: Riverside Cemetery, Yarmouth, Maine, U.S.
- Occupation: Arborist
- Known for: "Herbie"

Frank Addison Knight (October 17, 1908 – May 14, 2012) was an arborist from Yarmouth, Maine, United States. One of his most prominent roles was as the tree warden for "Herbie", an American elm that stood in Yarmouth for over 200 years. It was a role he held for around the last fifty years of the tree's life. "Herbie" was the oldest and largest American elm in New England. The tree was cut down in 2010 after succumbing to Dutch elm disease. Knight's efforts to extend the tree's life brought him international attention. He estimated he saved the tree's life on fourteen occasions over five decades. "It's his time now, and soon it will be mine," a 101-year-old Knight said, attending the tree's removal on January 19, 2010.

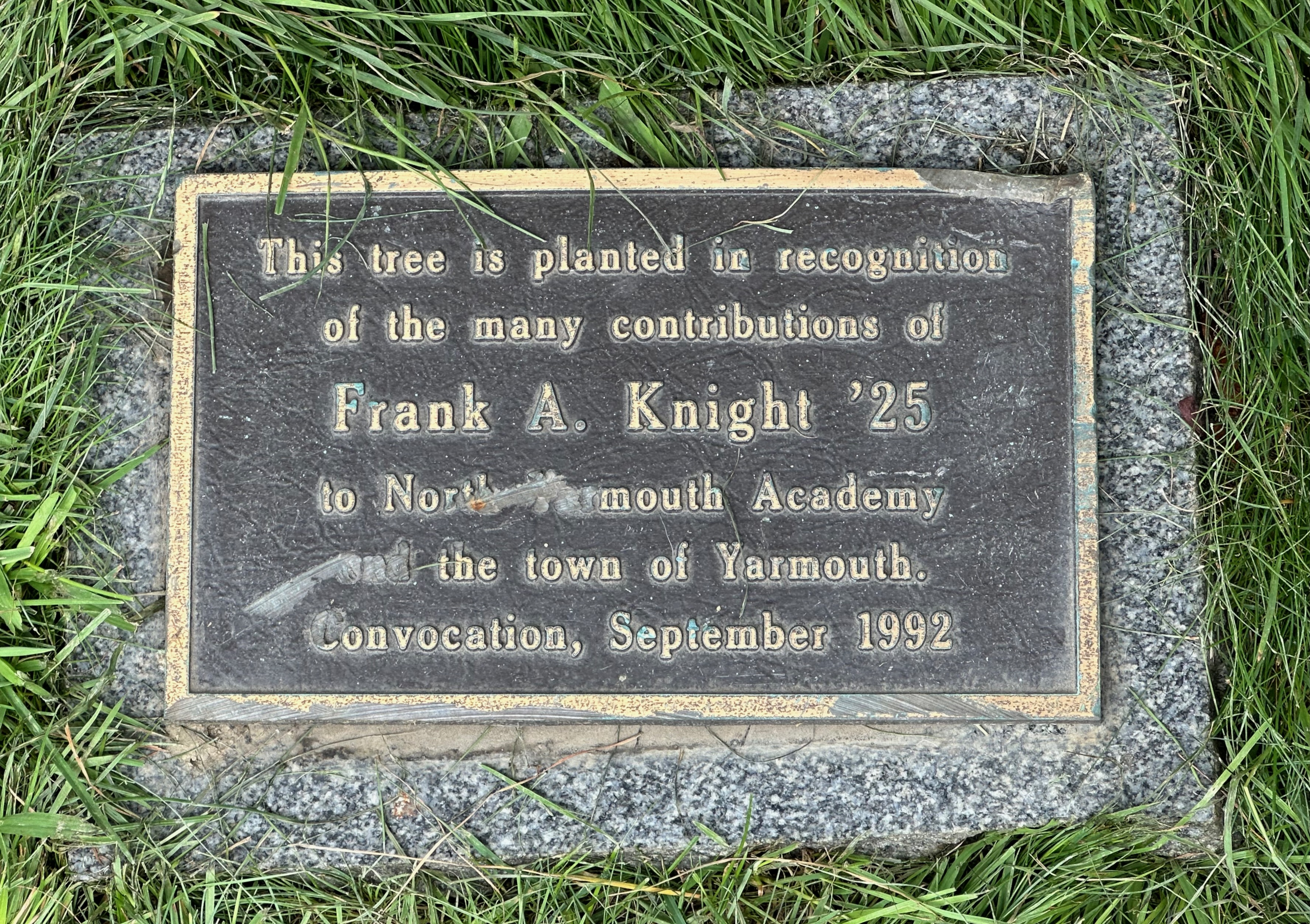
A plaque honoring Knight was installed in front of North Yarmouth Academy in 1992

== Personal life ==
Knight was born in Pownal, Maine, on October 17, 1908, to Frank Addison Sr. and Kate Hodsdon Knight. His father ran a sawmill on Hodsdon Road in Pownal.

He graduated North Yarmouth Academy in 1925, and later served on the school's board of trustees for over 25 years. He also graduated from the University of Maine at Orono with a forestry degree. His early career saw him working in woodlands in upstate New York and northern Maine. He later began his own business clearing land and harvesting pulp wood. He also harvested low-bush blueberries in southern Maine.

Knight married Frances Mann in 1933. They were together for 61 years, until her death in 1994. They had one child.

He put one reason for his longevity down to having beer and spinach for lunch.

Knight was a member of Yarmouth's First Parish Congregational Church for over sixty years, serving as the treasurer of the church ministerial fund for three decades. He was also on the town's Planning Board and a trustee of its Merrill Memorial Library.

Until the final week of his life, Knight lived on Sligo Road in Yarmouth. His cottage was demolished and replaced with a new structure shortly after his death.

== Death and legacy ==
Knight died on May 14, 2012, at the age of 103. He had entered hospice care three days earlier. His casket had been made, in secret, out of Herbie's wood. "Frank took good care of Herbie. Now Herbie will take good care of Frank," said Deb Hopkins, who succeeded Knight as Yarmouth's tree warden in 2006. He is buried alongside his wife in Yarmouth's Riverside Cemetery.

Knight cared for the tree for half of his life, having accepted the role in 1956. Knight's efforts were recognized by the Town of Yarmouth: the athletic fields at North Yarmouth Academy bear his name, as does a forest behind the town's community garden; a tree in front of NYA was planted in his honor; and, in 1983, he was the fourth recipient of the town's Latchstring Award.

In 2009, Knight joked that he was seen as a "tree lover," but that he had probably "taken down more trees than anyone in Maine."
