= Seth Larrabee =

American attorney and state legislator (1855–1910)

- Larrabee pictured around 1900
- Born: January 22, 1855; Scarborough, Maine, U.S.
- Died: December 8, 1910 (aged 55)
- Resting place: Evergreen Cemetery, Portland, Maine, U.S.
- Occupations: Attorney, state legislator

Seth Leonard Larrabee (January 22, 1855 – December 8, 1910) was an American attorney and state legislator. He was a speaker of the Maine House of Representatives.

== Early life ==
Larrabee was born in Scarborough, Maine, in 1855, to Jordan Libby Larrabee, a farmer, and Caroline Frances Beals. He was their second known child, after Albion, who was born in 1852 and became a medical doctor. He attended Westbrook Seminary, graduating in 1870. In 1872, he began studying at Bowdoin College, and graduated with the class of 1875.

== Career ==
Upon graduating college, Larrabee spent a year teaching languages at Goddard Seminary in Barre, Vermont.

He began studying law in the offices of Strout and Gage, before being admitted to the bar of Cumberland County, Maine, in 1878. Two years later, he was elected register of probate for the county, a role in which he remained for nine years. He was elected city solicitor for Portland, Maine, on three occasions—1891, 1893 and 1895—and, as a Republican, to the Maine Legislature. He was unanimously elected speaker of the Maine House of Representatives in 1898.

In 1898, he was one of twenty individuals involved in the formation of the Portland and Yarmouth Electric Railway. He was elected its president. He was also a co-founder, vice-president and director of the Chapman National Bank, and was a trustee and attorney for the Mercantile Trust Company, which he co-founded.

== Personal life ==
In 1880, Larrabee married Lulu B. Sturdevant, with whom he had two known children.

Larrabee was a member of the Portland Board of Trade for many years, and was one of the original members of the Casco and Portland Loan and Building Associations, as well as being a director, treasurer and attorney for each.

He served two years as captain of the First Maine Battery of the state militia.

In 1907, Larrabee purchased the home at 357 Spring Street in Portland's West End from fellow attorney Edward Cox.

== Death ==
Larrabee died in 1910, aged 55. He was interred in Portland's Evergreen Cemetery. His parents and brother are interred in Black Point Cemetery in Scarborough.
