= Carl Henry Winslow =

American fire chief (1931–2020)

- Winslow in his Yarmouth Fire Department uniform
- Born: November 14, 1931; Portland, Maine, U.S.
- Died: October 31, 2020 (aged 89); Yarmouth, Maine, U.S.
- Resting place: Riverside Cemetery, Yarmouth, Maine
- Occupation: Fire chief
- Spouse: Pat May Whittemore (1956–2018; her death)

Carl Henry Winslow (November 14, 1931 – October 31, 2020) was an American fire chief and United States Army Reserves staff sergeant. He was the fire chief in Yarmouth, Maine, for seventeen years. The town's former fire station is now named for him.

== Life and career ==
Winslow was born in Portland, Maine, on November 14, 1931, a son of Ernest Albert Winslow and Florence Isabel Morrison.

He graduated from North Yarmouth Academy in 1949, and went on to receive a bachelor's degree in education from Gorham State Teacher's College. He earned a master's degree from the University of Maine in 1962. He attended Eastern Michigan University as a recipient of a National Science Foundation fellowship.

Winslow married Priscilla (Pat) May Whittemore on December 23, 1956, after two years' service in the United States Army. He went on to be a staff sergeant in the Army Reserves between 1956 and 1963.

He began a career at Yarmouth Junior High School between 1956 and 1963, when it was located in Brickyard Hollow, teaching seventh-grade math and science. Five years later, he became principal of grades 3 to 6 at Yarmouth Elementary School, and of Yarmouth Intermediate School between 1963 and 1968.

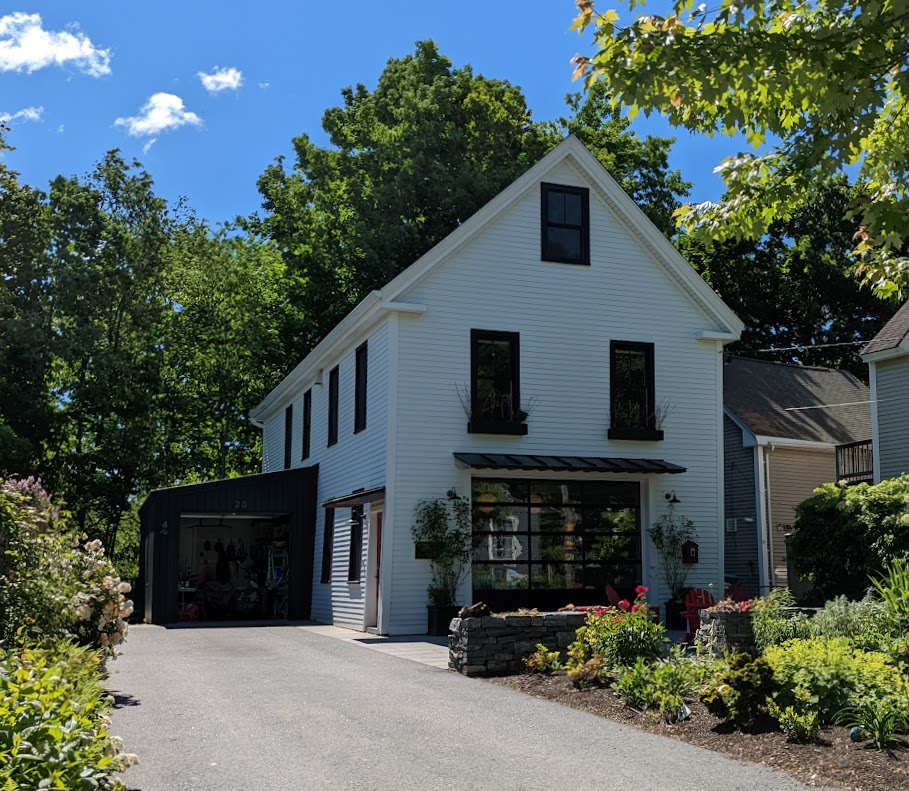
Winslow Station, pictured in 2022

Winslow was the fire chief in Yarmouth for seventeen of his forty-four years (1952–1996) in its ranks.

He was a member of the Yarmouth Town Council for nine years, serving as its chair in 2006 and 2007. He received the town's "Latchstring Award" in 2014.

Winslow was a Past Master of Casco Lodge #36 A. F. & A. M., Past High Priest of the Cumberland/Mount Vernon Chapter #1 R.A.M., a Knight Templar of Portland-St. Alban Commandery #2, a 32nd-degree Mason in the Valley of Portland, and a member of Portland Council #2.

He was treasurer of the Yarmouth First Baptist Church from 2000 to 2016.

On April 10, 2018, in their 62nd year of marriage, Pat died at the age of 86.

== Death ==
Grave marker at Riverside Cemetery in Yarmouth

Winslow died on October 31, 2020, aged 89. He is interred, alongside his wife, in Yarmouth's Riverside Cemetery.

What is now named Winslow Station, in his honor, served as Yarmouth's only fire station from 1953 until the mid-1990s. Located at 20 Center Street, it was used by the fire department until 2004.
