= First Baptist Church (Yarmouth, Maine) =

Historic church in Maine, United States

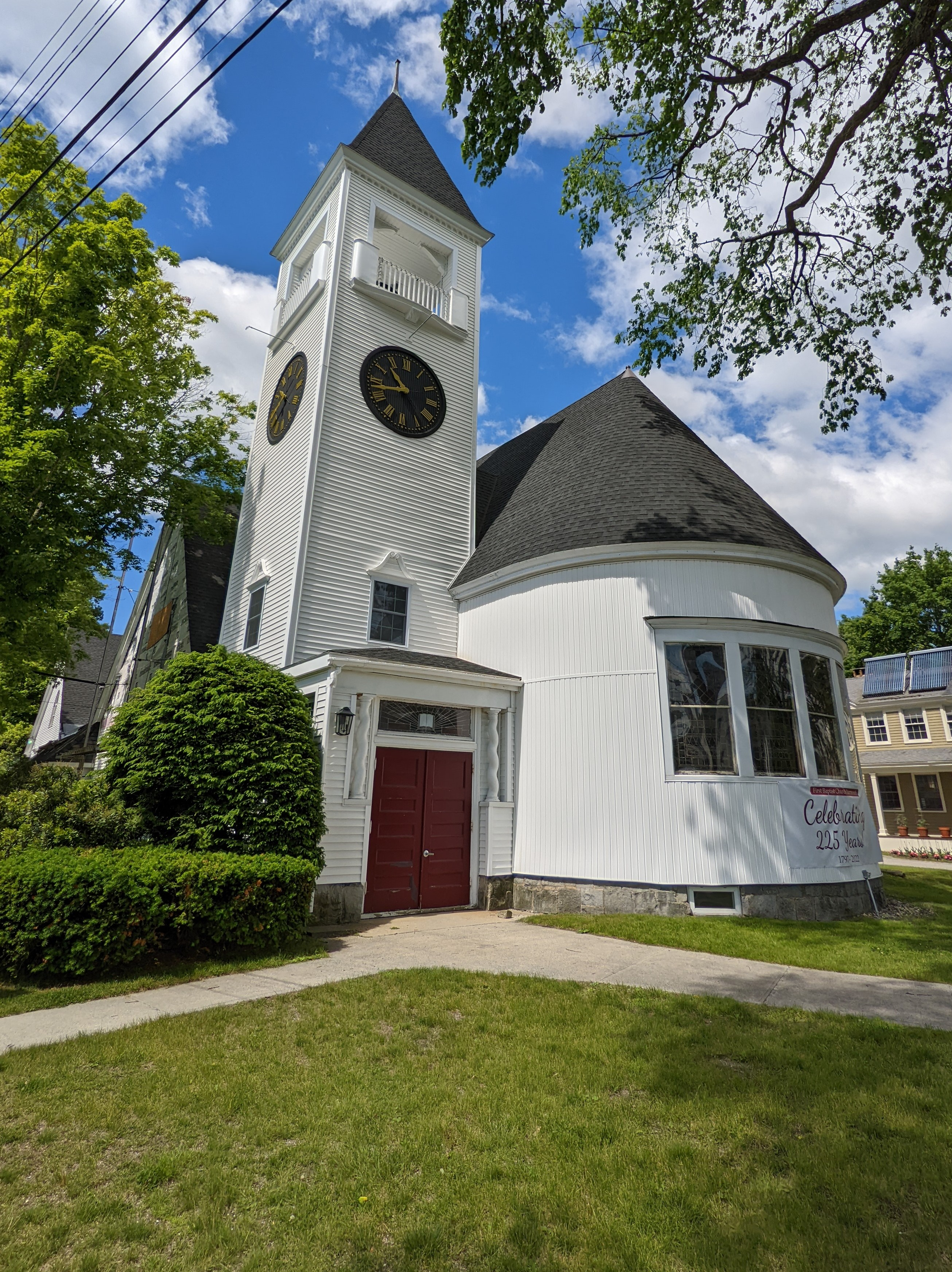
- The church in 2022
- First Baptist Church
- 43.80287878°N 70.19301539°W
- Location: 346 Main Street, Yarmouth, Maine
- Country: United States
- Denomination: Baptist

Architecture
- Architect: John Calvin Stevens
- Completed: 1889 (137 years ago)

The First Baptist Church is a historic church at 346 Main Street in Yarmouth, Maine, United States. The congregation was established in 1796 at the nearby North Yarmouth and Freeport Baptist Meetinghouse. It moved to its current location in 1889.

The building was designed by noted architect John Calvin Stevens. Its clock was a donation, added after the completion of the church.

Yarmouth's former fire chief, Carl Winslow, was the church treasurer from 2000 to 2016.

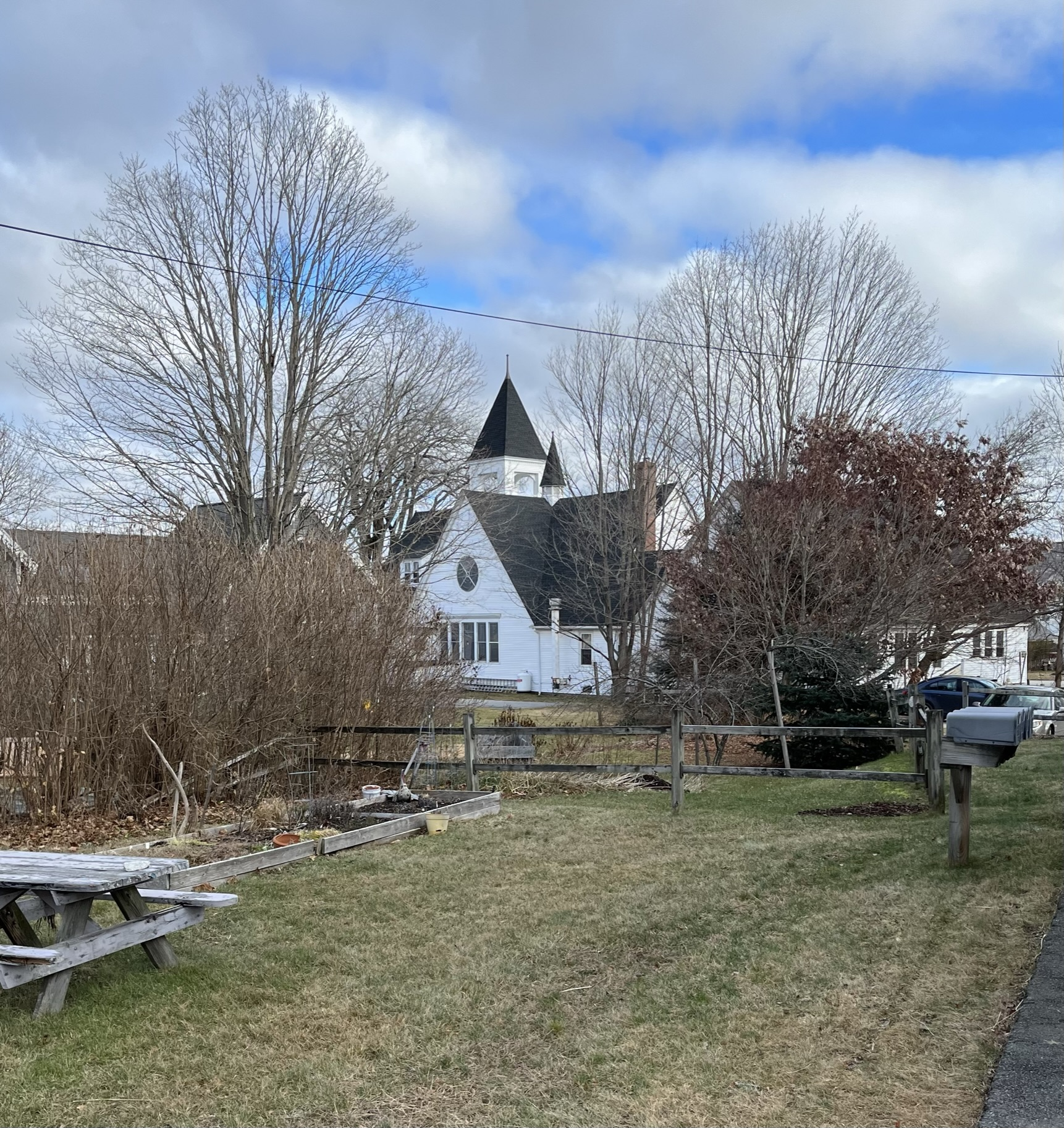
The western side of the church, viewed from West Elm Street
