= York Landing, Maine =

York Landing York Ledge
- Community
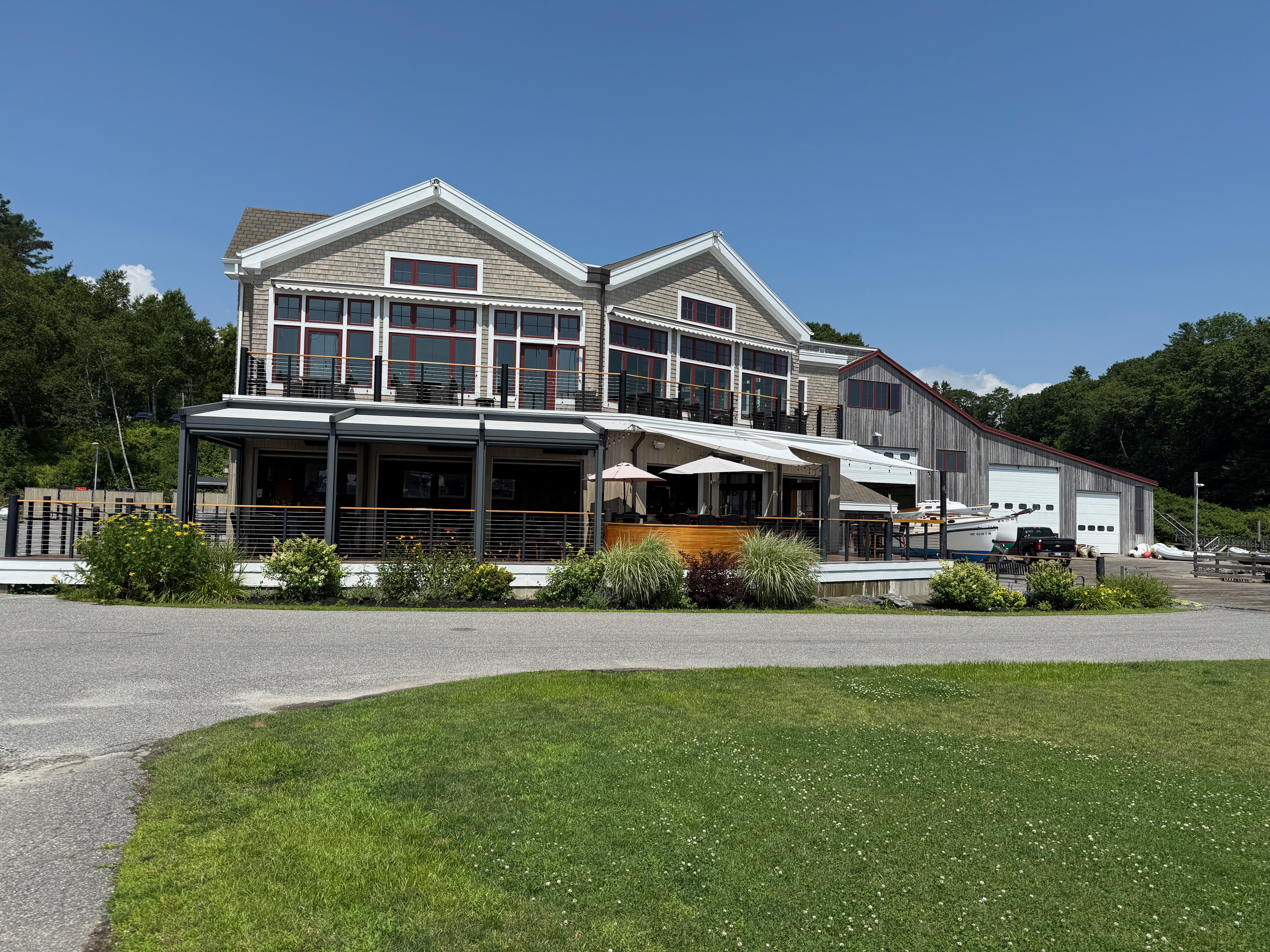
- Pictured in 2025, when Dockside Grill and Handy Boat Service occupied the point
- Interactive map of York Landing
- Coordinates: 43.7287189°N 70.208980°W
- Country: United States
- State: Maine
- County: Cumberland
- Town: Falmouth
- Time zone: UTC-5 (Eastern (EST))
  - Summer (DST): UTC-4 (EDT)

York Landing is a community in Falmouth, Maine, United States. Located on Casco Bay, around 1,750 feet (530 m) south of Falmouth Town Landing, it is named for Samuel York, a 17th-century settler in the area.

The community is located on the eastern side of State Route 88. The Dockside Grill, a popular restaurant which opened in 2013, is situated on York Landing, as is Handy Boat Service.

== See also ==
- Underwood Spring Park, formerly located nearby
