= Frank L. Oakes =

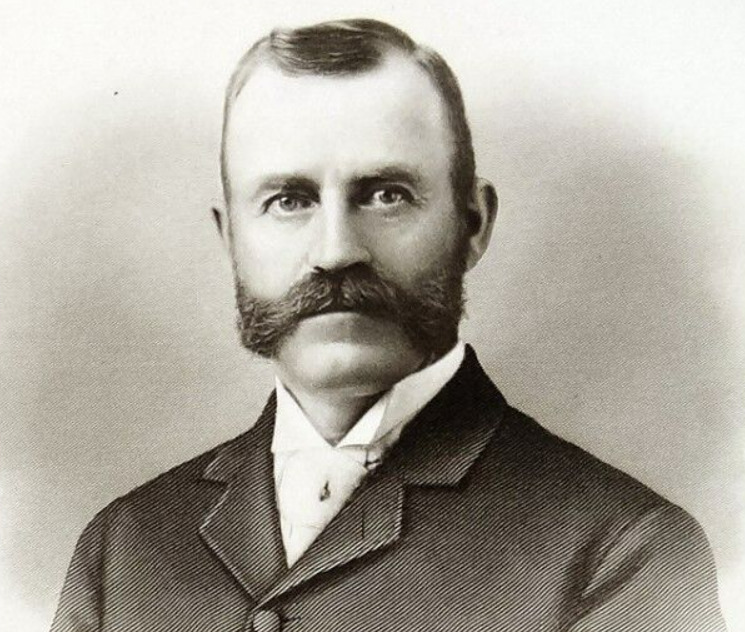
- Oakes, pictured around 1900
- Born: Frank Lovell Oakes; August 8, 1850; Yarmouth, Maine, U.S.
- Died: January 31, 1912 (aged 61); Newton, Massachusetts, U.S.
- Resting place: Riverside Cemetery, Yarmouth, Maine, U.S.
- Occupation: Sea captain
- Spouse: Frances E. Blanchard (1877–1912; his death)

Frank Lovell Oakes (August 8, 1850 – January 31, 1912) was an American sea captain of the late 19th and early 20th centuries. For 27 years, he was the commander of many ships engaged in overseas voyages.

== Life and career ==
Oakes was born in Yarmouth, Maine, on August 8, 1850, to Benjamin Oakes (1819–1901) and Mary Lovell (1819–1866). His younger brother was Charles Chandler Oakes (1856–1934), who was also a ship captain, as well as an author. A sister, Annetta, preceded Oakes in birth, but died in infancy in 1849. A brother, Willie King, followed him in 1853, but died the same year.

He began his seafaring career at the age of fifteen, around the time of his mother's death, on a schooner for the short sailing between Portland and Yarmouth.

On May 9, 1877, he married Frances E. Blanchard of the notable shipbuilding family of their hometown. Her parents were Perez N. Blanchard and Cynthia S. Blanchard. The couple had one child, Frances, who died in infancy.

On March 10, 1882, Oakes was in command of the S. C. Blanchard (named for his wife's grandfather Sylvanus Cushing Blanchard) when it set sail for a voyage to Antwerp, Belgium, with 2900 short tons of wheat on board. His brother was third mate, while his wife was also on board. On May 29, the vessel met "unfavorable conditions" during a "nor'west gale of thirty-six hours duration" that turned into a hurricane. It was decided that the fore and mizzenmasts had to be cut, to relieve the strain on the ship's hull. The winds continued for several days, and the ship became incapacitated. The second mate spotted a passing ship a short distance away in the moonlight. The Blanchard launched a few rockets, which were answered with blue lights from the other ship, the County of Lancaster, in the charge of Captain Richard Quiller. The occupants of the troubled vessel were transferred to the rescue ship, and the Blanchard was left to her fate.

In 1890, the Oakeses built a cottage in White's Cove, Yarmouth, near Cousins Island. They later moved to Newton, Massachusetts.

In 1911, Oakes was a member of the State Pilot Commission in Boston, with his term ending that year.

Oakes was a member of the Massachusetts Horticultural Society from 1902 until his death. He was also a member of the Boston Marine Society and its counterparts in Portland and Providence, Rhode Island.

== Death ==
Oakes died on January 31, 1912, in Newton, Massachusetts. He was 61. His wife survived him by 24 years and was interred beside him in Yarmouth's Riverside Cemetery, in the same plot as his parents and three siblings.
