= Lyman Fessenden Walker =

American shipwright (1836–1920)

- Walker in the early 20th century
- Born: 1836
- Died: 1920 (aged 83 or 84)
- Resting place: Riverside Cemetery, Yarmouth, Maine, U.S.
- Occupation: Shipwright
- Known for: Shipbuilding

Lyman Fessenden Walker (1836–1920) was an American shipwright during a prolific period at Yarmouth Harbor in Maine. His shipyard was one of the four major ones during the town's peak years of 1850–1875. His shipyard launched forty vessels of all sizes.

== Early life ==
Walker was born in 1836, to Lyman Walker and Louisa Merchant.

== Career ==
After beginning as a shipwright, in 1841 he was recognized as a master builder.

== Death ==
Walker died in 1920, aged 83 or 84.
