= Herbert A. Merrill =

American dentist

- Born: August 24, 1855
- Died: September 28, 1926 (aged 71); Yarmouth, Maine, U.S.
- Resting place: Riverside Cemetery, Yarmouth, Maine, U.S.
- Occupation: Physician

Herbert A. Merrill DDS (August 24, 1855 – September 29, 1926) was an American dentist and militia officer.

== Life and career ==
Merrill was born on August 24, 1855. He graduated from Boston Dental College in 1881.

He married Leila Small, with whom he had at least two children: Jessie and Lawrence.

Merrill established his dental practice in 1881. In 1889, the practice was located in the rear of his house, built four years earlier, in Brickyard Hollow on Yarmouth's Main Street. It has since been moved to 26 School Street. It is the building now occupied by InSight Eyecare on the InterMed campus. By 1901, Merrill had an office in nearby Portland. He and his family lived in Portland for the first few months of 1897, but had returned to Yarmouth by June.

In 1883, Merrill was a second lieutenant with the Yarmouth Rifles; by 1889 he was captain. In 1895, the following evaluation of the Yarmouth Rifles was delivered: that they should "in no way be considered a part of the Guard. From inquiries made, judge it now to be an organization in name only."

In July 1883, Merrill was elected to the Maine Dental Society.

Along with nineteen other locals, including Lorenzo L. Shaw, Merrill formed the Portland and Yarmouth Electric Railway Company in 1898.

== Death ==
Merrill died on September 28, 1926, aged 71. He is interred in Yarmouth's Riverside Cemetery, alongside his wife. She had remarried six years after Merrill's death, to Freeland A. Knight, who survived her by fourteen years. Knight was buried beside his first wife, Huldah C. Jackson, in Rumford, Maine.
