= First Parish Burial Ground =

Historic site in Essex County, Massachusetts, US

- U.S. National Register of Historic Places
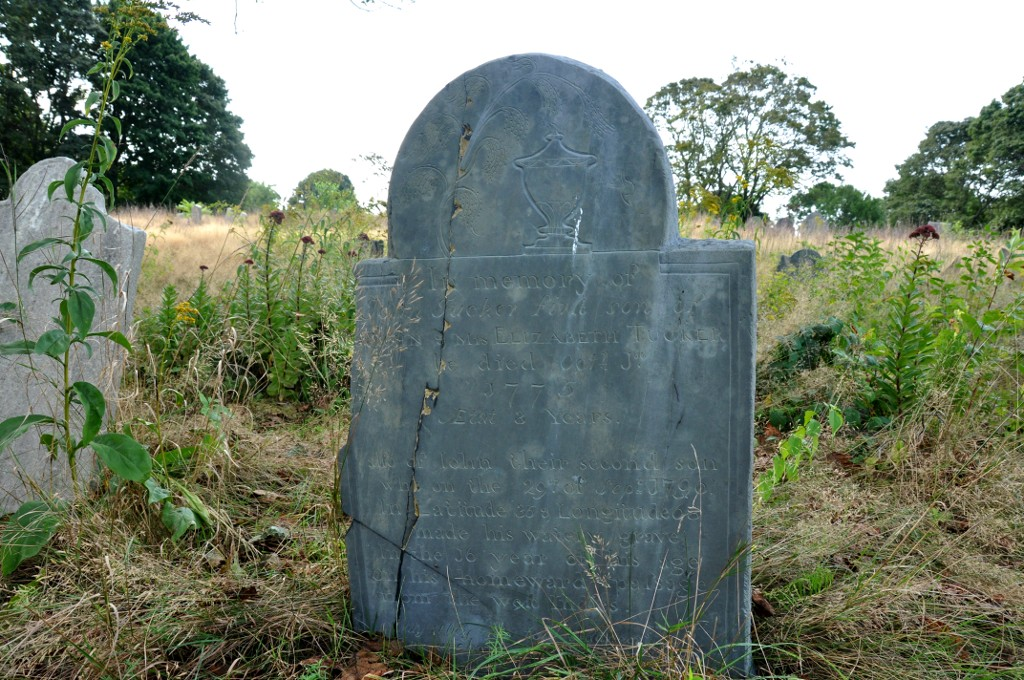
- An 18th-century grave marker

- Location within Massachusetts Location within the United States
- Location: 122 Centennial Ave., Gloucester, Massachusetts
- Coordinates: 42°37′3″N 70°40′23″W
- Built: 1644
- NRHP reference No.: 10000040
- Added to NRHP: February 26, 2010

The First Parish Burial Ground is a historic cemetery located at 122 Centennial Avenue in Gloucester, Massachusetts. Established in 1644, the 2.5 acres (1.0 ha) site is Gloucester's oldest burying ground. It once stood at the heart of the Gloucester settlement, and was for 80 years its only cemetery. It was listed on the National Register of Historic Places in 1975. It is now being maintained jointly by the city and the Cemetery Restoration Partnership.

== Description and history ==
Gloucester's First Parish Burial Ground is located northwest of downtown Gloucester, and about 0.25 miles (0.40 km) east of the Annisquam River. It is set on 2.5 acres (1.0 ha), mostly obscured from view by its remove from roadways and by mature border plantings. It is roughly hexagonal in shape, and is accessed by a narrow strip of land connecting it to Centennial Avenue. It is bounded by a playground, Clark's Cemetery, the MBTA Commuter Rail tracks, and the densely built housing of Centennial Avenue. Most of its border is demarcated by a low fieldstone wall, and there is an iron gate with stone posts at the entrance. The terrain is somewhat uneven, with tufted grass and other vegetation accentuating the unevenness.

Grave markers span a remarkable 295 years, from at least 1661 (though this marker is a reproduction) to 1956. There are about 650 marked graves, which do not follow any formal plan of organization. A number of markers have broken or become disfigured by the elements. The oldest markers, from the 17th century, are typically of slate, schist, or sandstone, and bear motifs of winged skulls. 19th-century graves are typically marked with marble. The largest single monument is the tomb Reverend John White (d. 1760), which is built out of brick with a sandstone top. Other prominent burials include veterans of the American Revolutionary War and the War of 1812. Burials declined after 1850, and the last recorded burial was in 1925.

The cemetery was laid out in 1644, when this area was near Gloucester's original main settlement (roughly where Grant Circle is now located). It was for eighty years the town's only cemetery. It is presently overseen by the city's Cemetery Advisory Committee.

== See also ==
- National Register of Historic Places listings in Gloucester, Massachusetts
- National Register of Historic Places listings in Essex County, Massachusetts
