= Herbie (tree) =

American elm tree in Yarmouth, Maine, United States

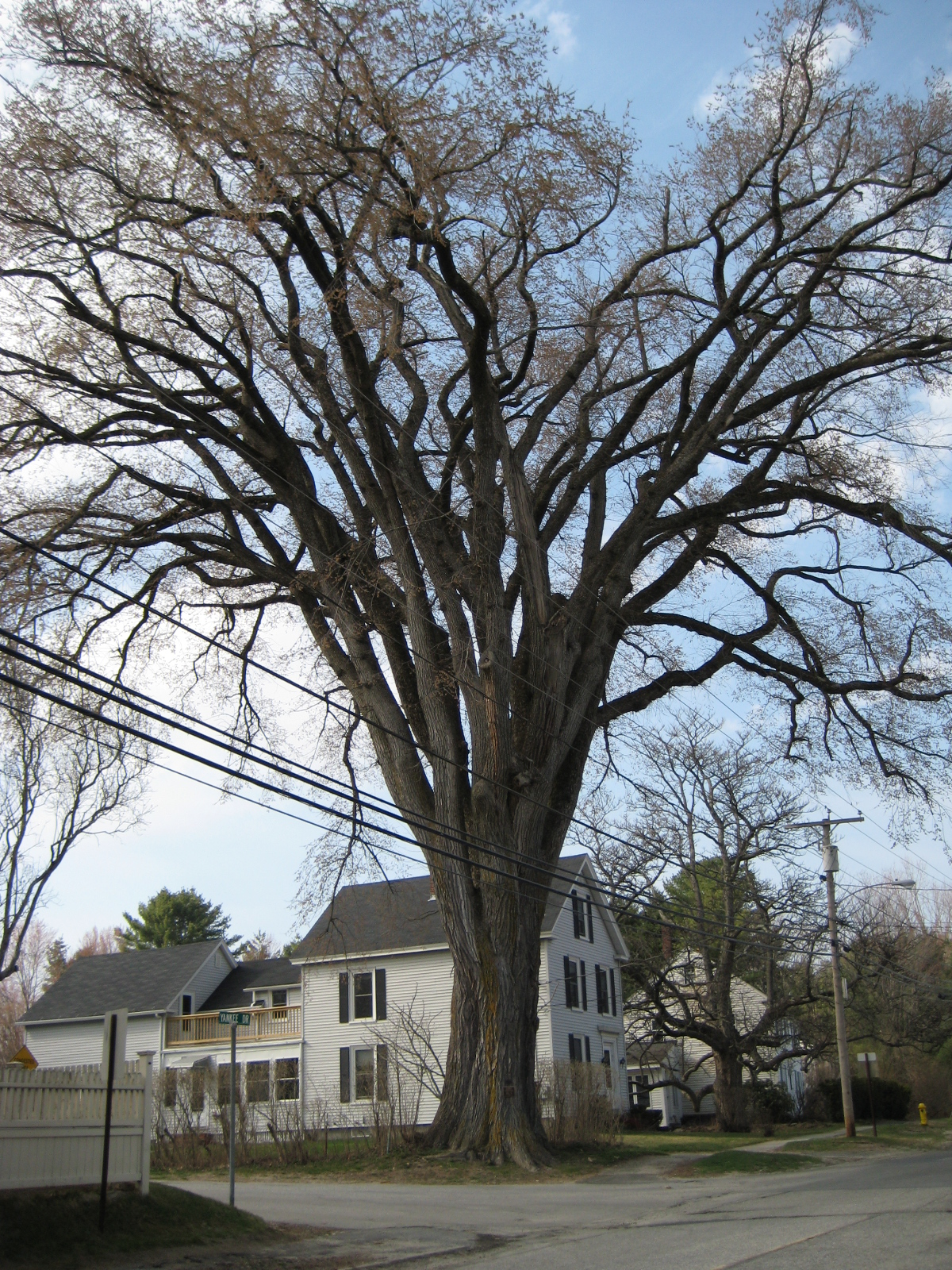
- "Herbie", viewed prior to its spread being reduced in 2008. The tree was cut down in 2010

- Location within Maine Location within the United States
- Species: American elm (Ulmus americana)
- Coordinates: 43.800573°N 70.176283°W
- Date seeded: 1793
- Date felled: 2010

"Herbie" was an American elm tree located in Yarmouth, Maine, United States. It stood by present-day East Main Street (State Route 88), at its intersection with Yankee Drive, for 217 years (from 1793 to January 19, 2010). At 110 feet (34 m) in height, it was, between 1997 and the date of its felling, the oldest and largest of its kind in New England. The tree, which partially stood in the front yard of a private residence, also had a 20-foot (6.1 m) circumference and (until mid-2008) a 93-foot (28 m) crown spread. It was so-named when children witnessed some of its diseased limbs being sawn off. "What are you going to do to Herbie? Don't cut Herbie!" they cried, and the name stuck.

A plaque on its trunk stated:

Historic Elm

This tree is hereby designated
a historic landmark to be
honored and preserved for
future generations.

Elm Research Institute, Harrisville, N.H. 03450

On May 1, 1834, the town gave Herbie some company by planting rows of elm trees along East Elm Street. From 1957 onward, however, most of them succumbed to Dutch elm disease. As of 2003, only twenty of Yarmouth's original 739 elms had survived.

After battling fifteen bouts of Dutch elm disease, in 2007, stripes appeared under the tree's bark, indicating a worsening condition. In August 2009, it was revealed that Herbie would be cut down on January 18 and 19, 2010, at a cost of $20,000. In October 2009, the plaque was removed from its trunk and replaced with a laminated version, and before the end of the year, "The Herbie Project" fund-raising campaign was set up to raise money to care for and plant other trees in the town. After the tree's demise, local woodworkers used its wood to make products to be auctioned off to raise money for the trust.

A snowstorm during the night of January 17–18, 2010, postponed the removal. The tree was removed on January 19. A preliminary count of the tree's rings, done on site, revealed its age to be at least 212 years. On February 4, however, the official count showed it to be 217. The stump was removed over the weekend of May 29 and 30.

A section of the trunk's base was on show at the 2010 Yarmouth Clam Festival. It is now on permanent display outside Yarmouth town hall, on Cleaves Street, a project of the local Eagle Scouts. The section was removed in 2026 because it was showing signs of warping, having been exposed to the elements for sixteen years. After preservation work has been completed on the section, it will be returned to an upgraded version of the display kiosk.

Frank Knight, the town's former "tree warden", died at the age of 103 on May 14, 2012. Knight's casket was made, in secret, out of Herbie's wood. Succeeded by Deb Hopkins in 2006, Knight cared for the tree for half of his life, having accepted the role in 1956. Knight's efforts were recognized by the town: the athletic fields at North Yarmouth Academy bear his name, as does a forest behind the town's community garden; a tree in front of Yarmouth's town hall was planted in his honor; and, in 1983, he was the fourth recipient of the town's Latchstring Award.

== References in popular culture ==
In 2017, Portland's Liquid Riot Bottling Company released a beer in tribute to Herbie.

== Gallery ==
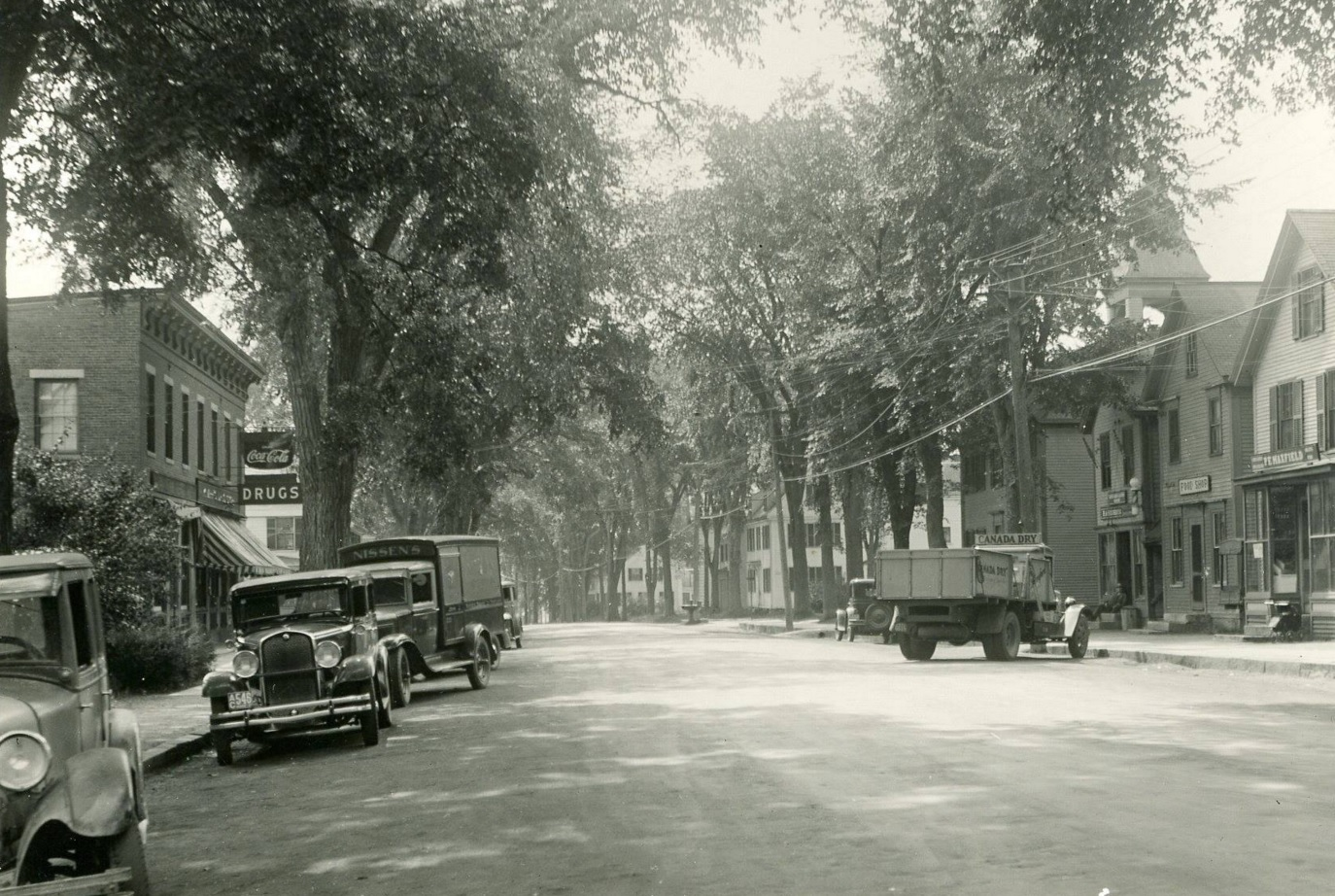
Yarmouth was once flush with American elms. These, on Main Street, were some of the original 739 that existed

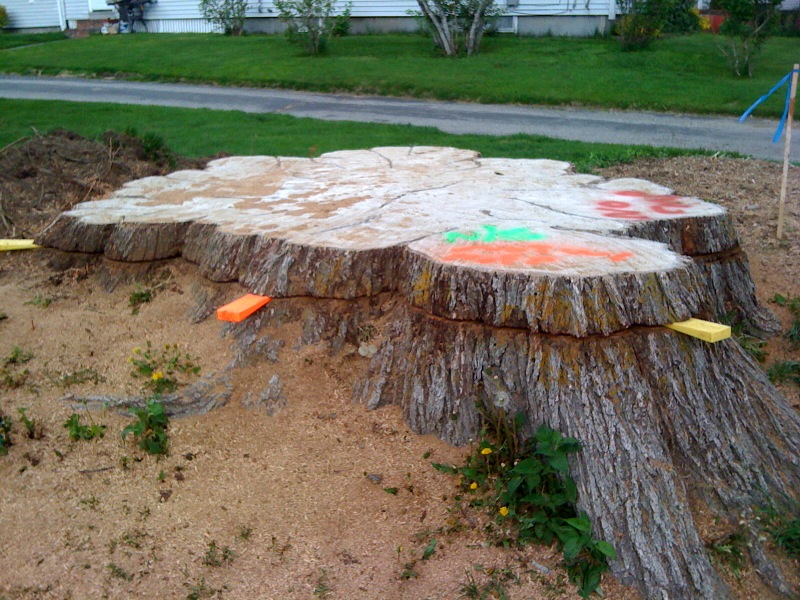
A section of Herbie's stump, pictured in May 2010, is prepared for removal. A stump grinder removed the remainder at the end of the month

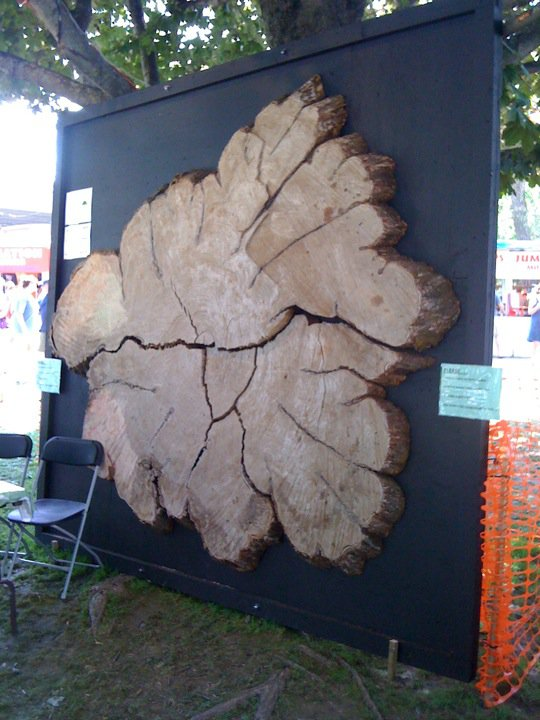
The above section on display at the 2010 Yarmouth Clam Festival. It is now on permanent display on Cleaves Street, on the property of Yarmouth's town hall

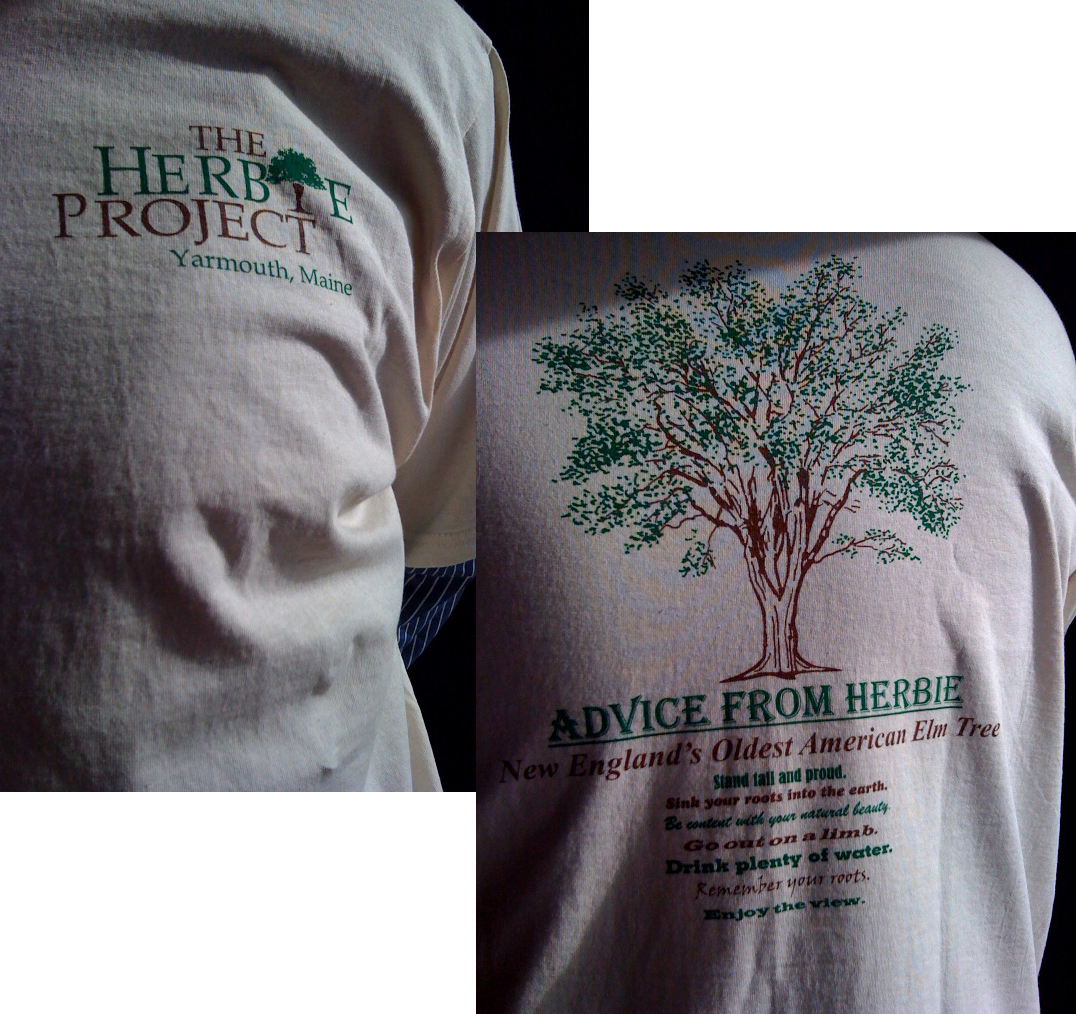
The front and back of a "The Herbie Project" T-shirt

== See also ==
- List of individual trees
- List of elm trees
