= Yarmouth Marina =

Marina and harbor in Yarmouth, Maine, U.S.

Coordinates: 43.797570°N 70.176825°W

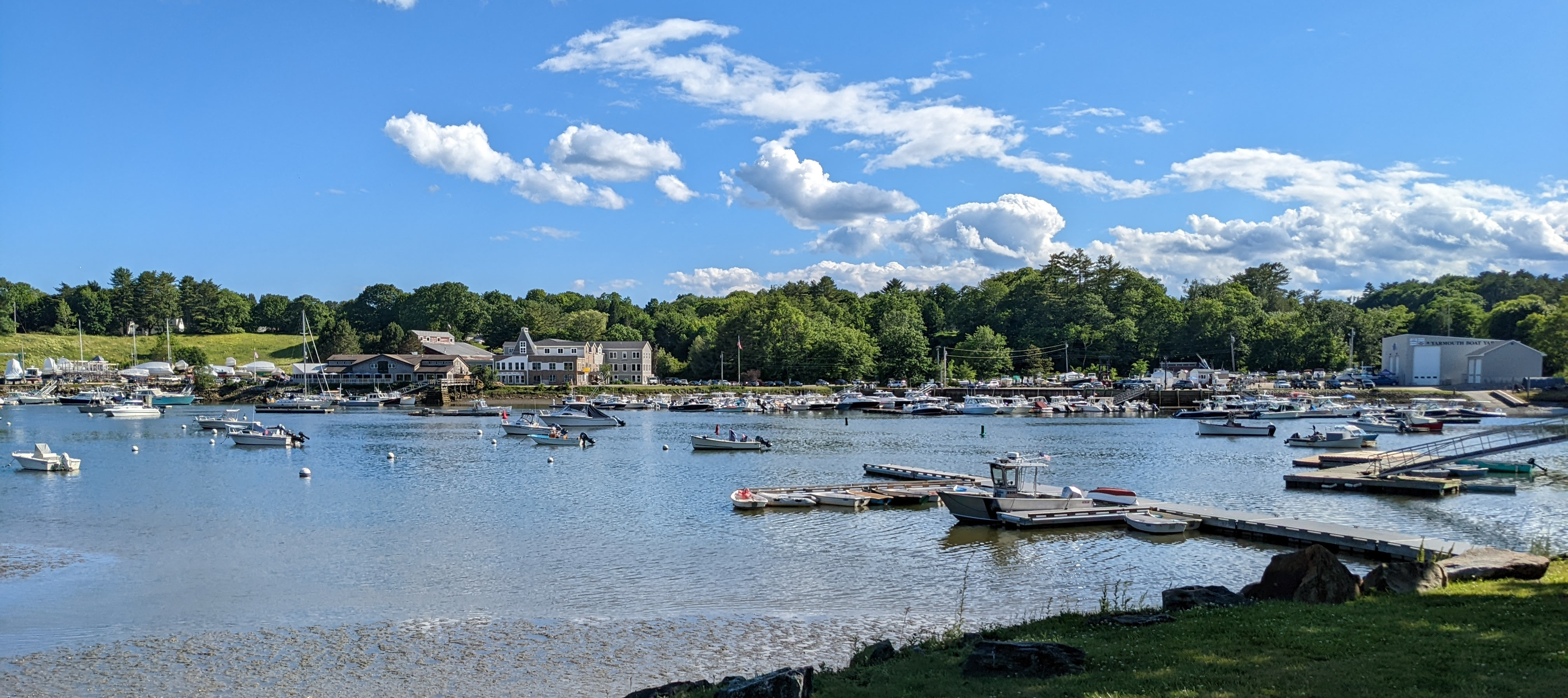
- A 2022 view south across the marina. From left to right: Yankee Marina & Boat Yard, Lower Falls Landing and Yarmouth Boat Yard

Location
- Country: United States
- Location: Yarmouth, Cumberland County, Maine

Details
- Harbormaster and Shellfish Warden: Will Owen

Statistics
- Website https://yarmouth.me.us/harborwaterfront

Yarmouth Marina is a natural harbor and estuary of Casco Bay, and is located adjacent to the town of Yarmouth, Maine, United States. It is situated at the mouth of the Royal River, around 0.5 miles (0.80 km) southeast of the town center, in an area known as Lower Falls. Today it functions solely as a marina.

Historically a harbor, due to its proximity to the Atlantic Ocean, into which the Royal River flows via Casco Bay less than a mile away, ships were built in the harbor mainly between 1818 and the 1870s, at which point demand declined dramatically.

== Shipbuilding ==
Maritime activities were important from the beginning of the town's third settlement, around 1715, after several clashes with the local Native Americans. Almost three hundred vessels were launched by Yarmouth's shipyards in the century between 1790 and 1890. Lumber from inland areas was shipped out from the harbor. Vessels were being built by 1740, and by 1818 shipbuilding in the area was in full swing, though Yarmouth's industry peaked in the 1870s, and declined rapidly shortly thereafter. Four major shipyards built vessels during this period. On the northern side of the river, Henry Hutchins and Edward J. Stubbs operated from 1851 to 1884. Sylvanus Blanchard and his three sons owned the Blanchard Brothers shipyard on Union Wharf. Lyman Fessenden Walker's shipyard launched forty vessels of all sizes. On the southern side of the river, near Atwell's Creek, Giles Loring had a shipyard. It was here that the final large sailing vessel was built, in 1890.

Take a look from Grist Mill Park across East Main Street toward the harbor. Today, you’ll see a view of I-295 and glimpses of modern marinas and boatyards, so imagine for a moment a 19th century perspective on the scene: major shipyards ringing the harbor with workers, building materials, and shops adding to the industrious atmosphere.

— Yarmouth Historical Society, Harbor History Tour

Interstate 295 was built through the harbor in 1961 (spanning part of the town known as Grantville across to the promontory between Route 88 and Old Shipyard Road, behind 35 East Main Street).

The late-18th-century and early-19th-century homes of several shipwrights and sea captains who worked out of the harbor are still standing in the area, predominantly on Pleasant Street. This street was the access road to the wharves before the Lafayette Street hill was paved. It is here that the road's elevation drops around 65 feet (from 75 feet (23 m) to 10 feet (3.0 m)) over a course of around 500 feet (150 m). The above-ground basement level of 51 Pleasant Street was used as a paymaster's office for the nearby shipyards.

== Today's harbor ==
Today, there are three boat yards. Two are located either side of Lower Falls Landing: Yarmouth Boat Yard (formerly Union Wharf; established in 1948; located almost beneath the northbound lanes of Interstate 295) and Yankee Marina & Boatyard (established in 1964; whose entrance is near the crest of the Route 88 hill). Royal River Boat Yard, established around 1957, is located on the northern side of the river, south of Bayview Street.

The office of the harbormaster is situated at the southern end of Old Shipyard Road, at the town landing and boat launch, also on the northern side of the river.

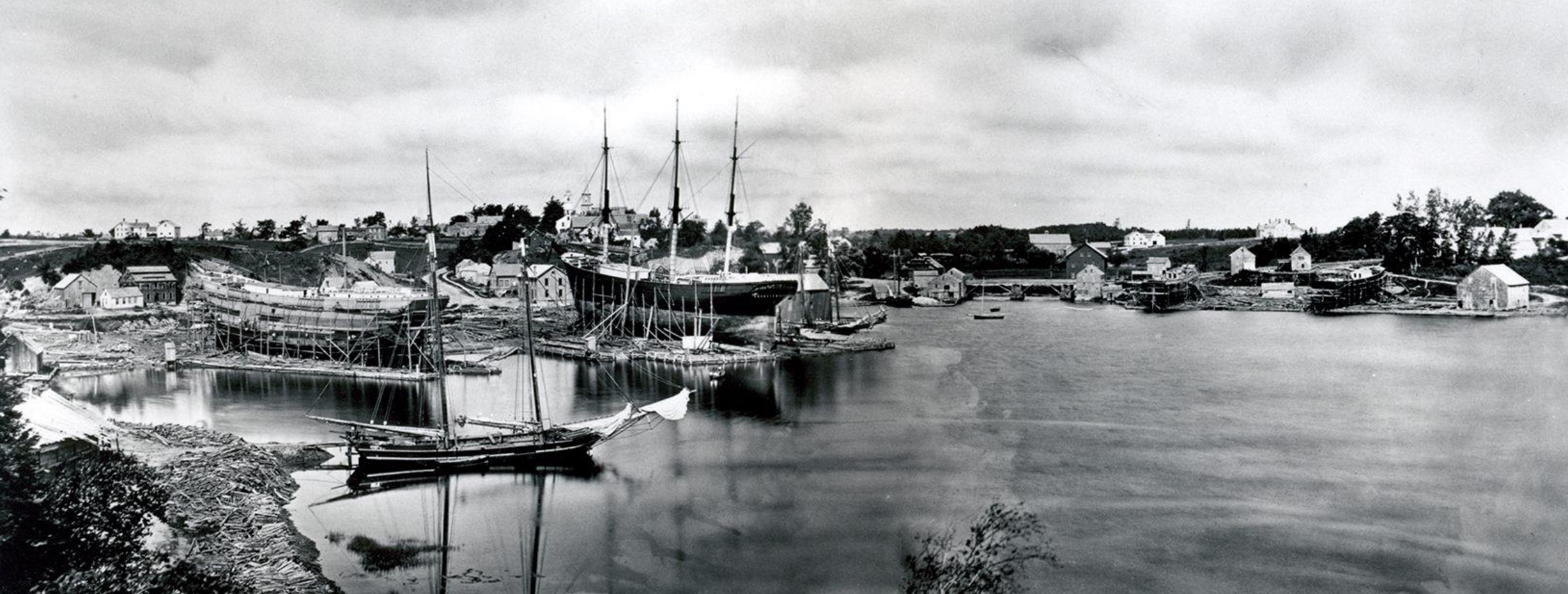
A c. 1870 view of Yarmouth's harbor, taken from where Yankee Marina — off Lafayette Street — is now, looking directly north to the East Main Street bridge

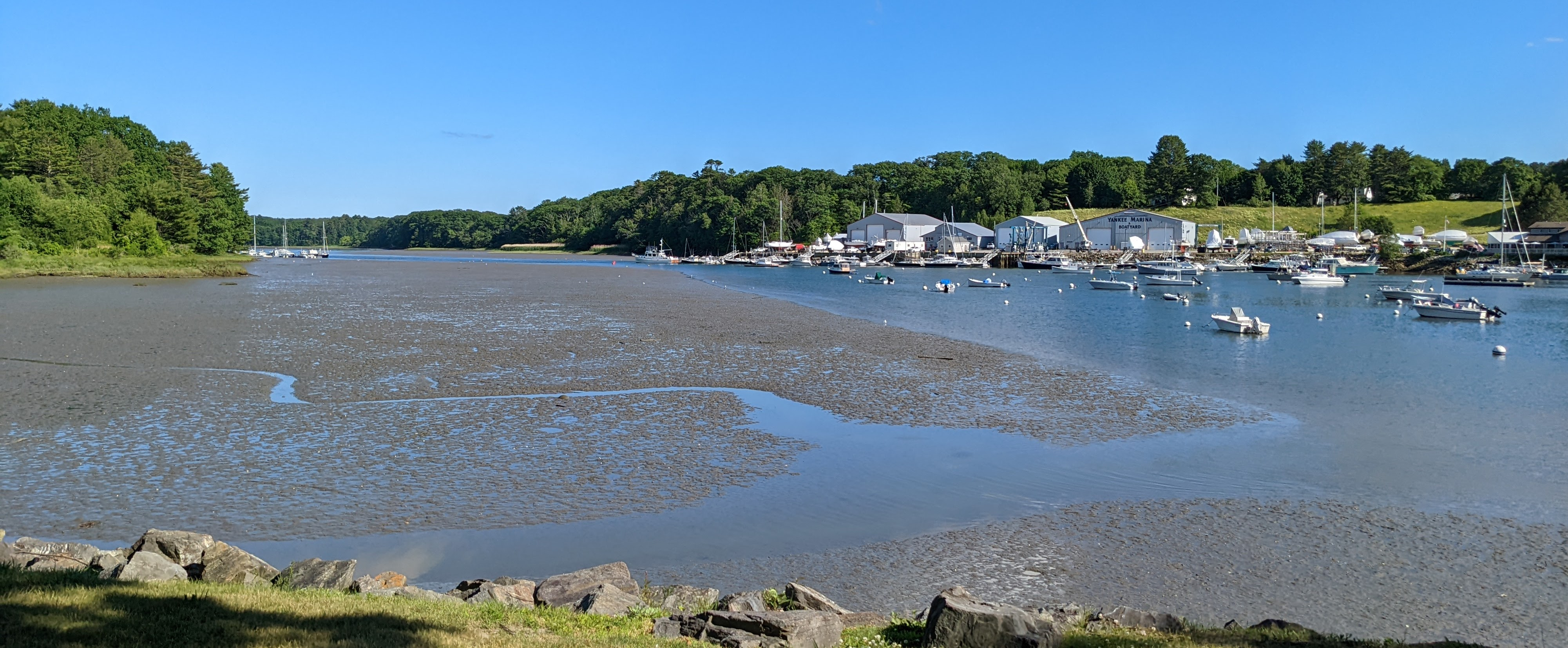
Looking toward where the preceding photograph was taken

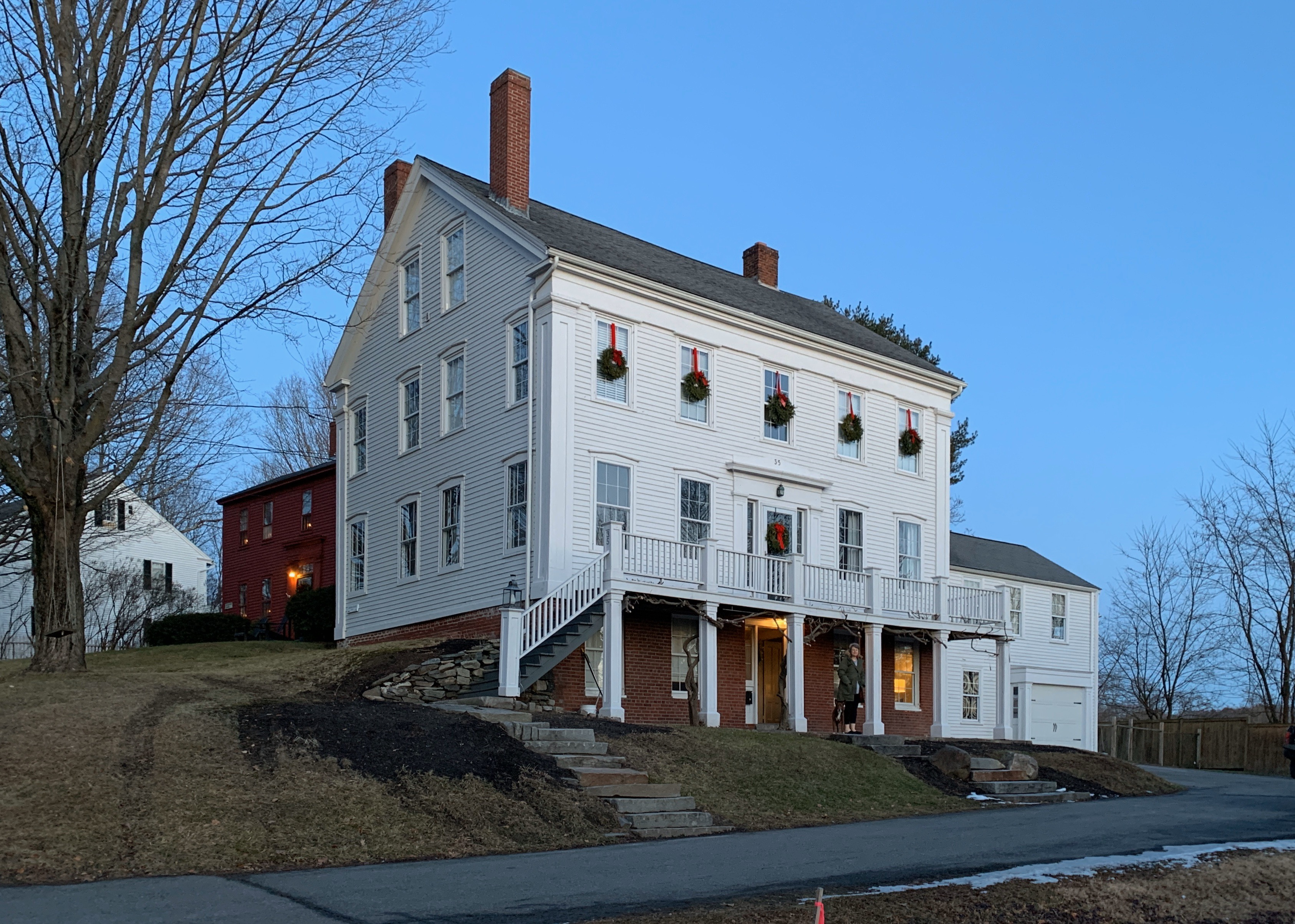
35 East Main Street, built in 1848, was formerly the home of shipbuilder Jeremiah Baker

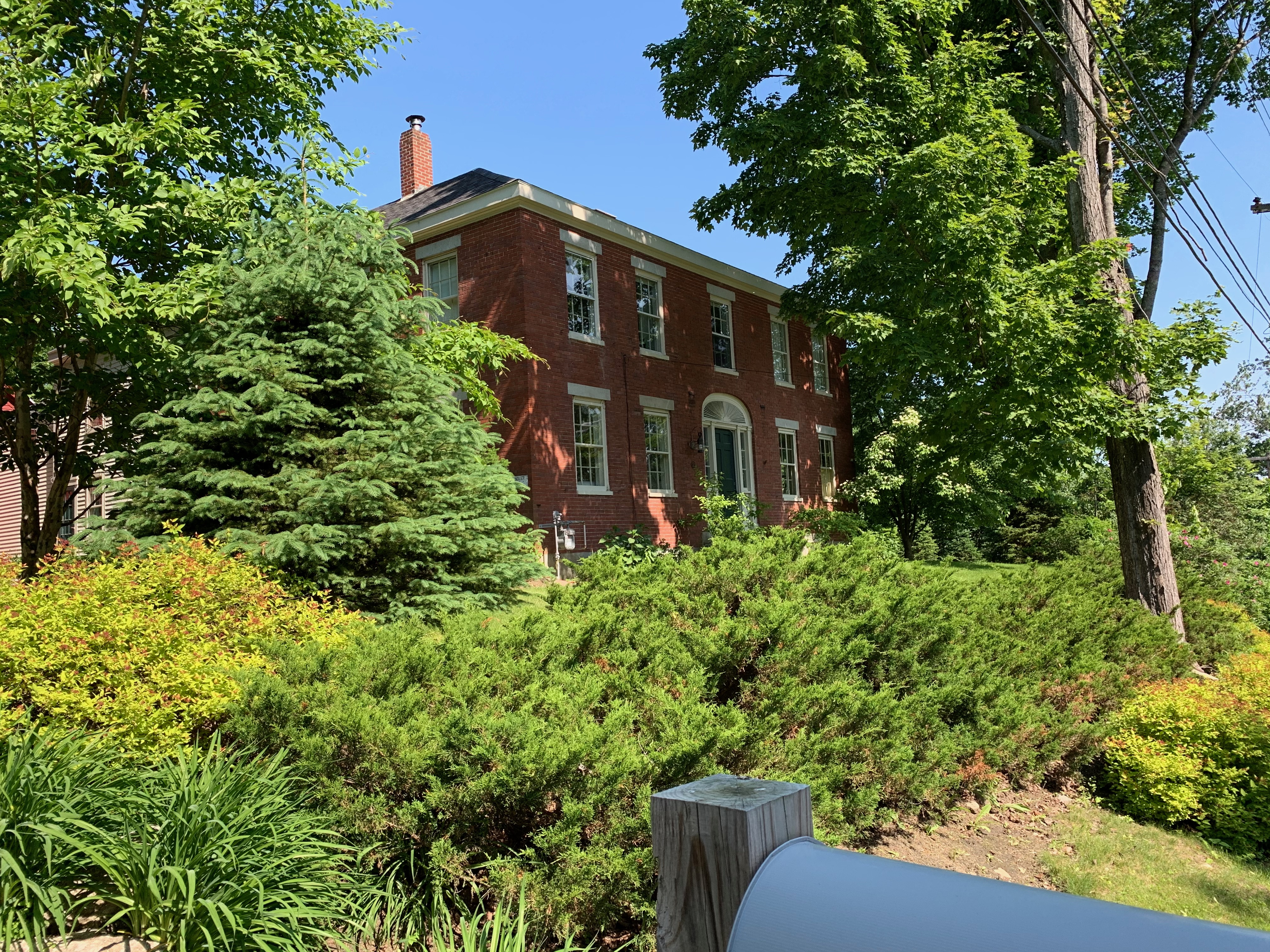
51 Pleasant Street has been the home of several notable Yarmouth residents, including master shipwright Giles Loring
