= Yarmouth, Maine =

Town in Maine, United States

- Town
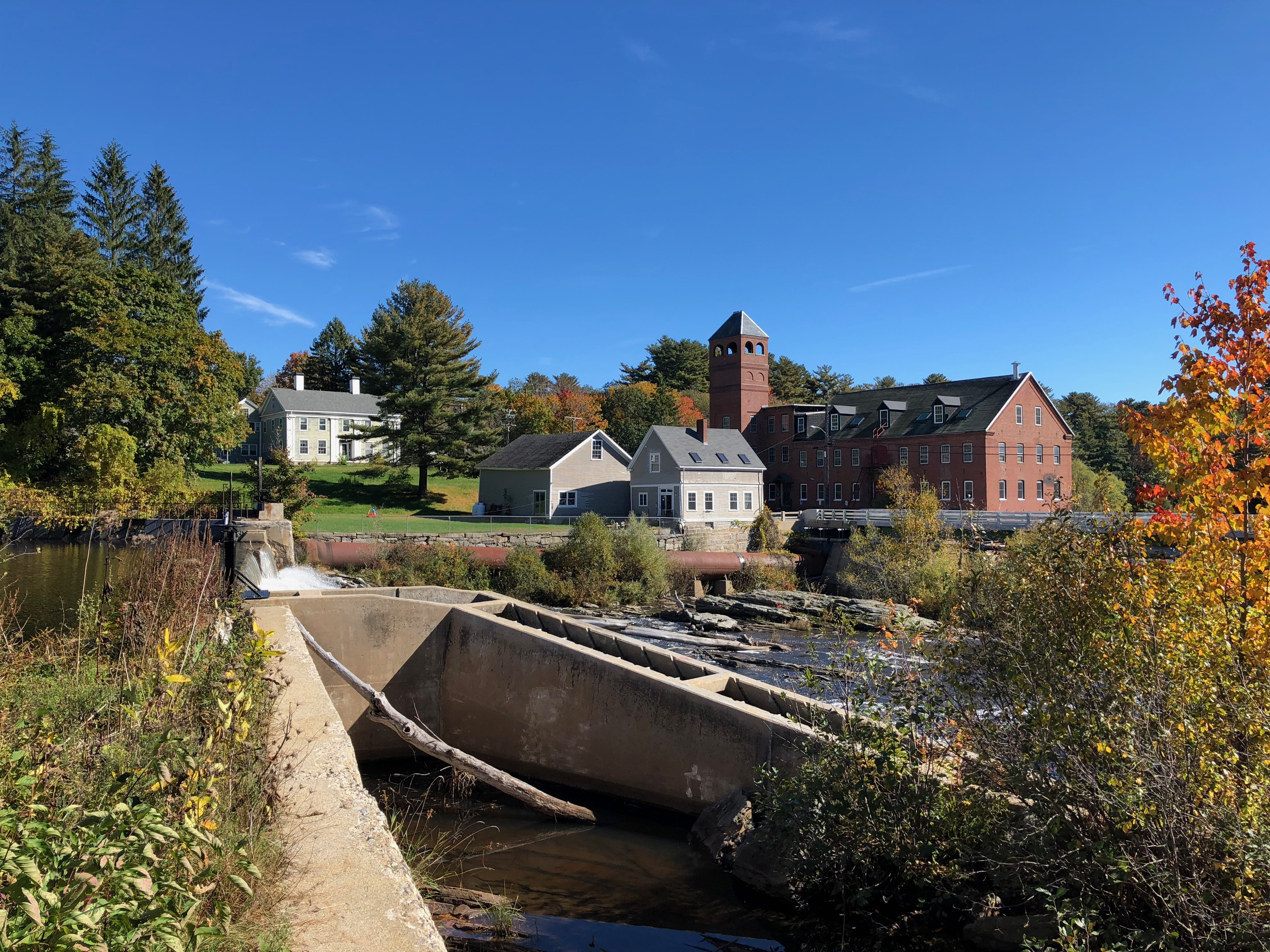
- Sparhawk Mill

- Flag Seal Logo
- Motto: Our Latchstring Always Out
- Interactive map of Yarmouth, Maine
- Location within Maine Location within the United States
- Coordinates: 43°46′32″N 70°08′45″W
- Country: United States
- State: Maine
- County: Cumberland
- Settled: 1636 (390 years ago)
- Incorporated: August 8, 1849 (177 years ago)
- Villages: Yarmouth; Cousins Island; Littlejohn Island; Lower Yarmouth; Yarmouthport; Yarmouth Landing

Area
  - Total: 22.94 sq mi (59.41 km^{2})
  - Land: 13.35 sq mi (34.58 km^{2})
  - Water: 9.59 sq mi (24.84 km^{2})
- Elevation: 10 ft (3.0 m)

Population (2020)
  - Total: 8,990
  - Density: 670/sq mi (260/km^{2})
- Time zone: UTC-5 (Eastern (EST))
  - Summer (DST): UTC-4 (EDT)
- ZIP code: 04096
- Area code: 207
- FIPS code: 23-87845
- GNIS feature ID: 582831
- Website: yarmouth.me.us

Yarmouth is a town in Cumberland County, Maine, United States. The town's population was 8,990 in the 2020 census. Yarmouth is 12 miles (19 km) north of the state's largest city, Portland, and is part of the Portland metropolitan area.

The town's proximity to the Atlantic Ocean, and its location on the banks of the Royal River (formerly Yarmouth River), which empties into Casco Bay less than 1 mile (1.6 km) away, means it is a prime location as a harbor. When originally settled as North Yarmouth in 1636, the town was part of the Massachusetts Bay Colony, and remained part of its subsequent incarnations for 213 years. In 1849, 29 years after Maine's admittance to the Union, it was incorporated as the Town of Yarmouth.

Ships were built in Yarmouth's harbor mainly between 1818 and the 1870s, at which point demand declined dramatically. Meanwhile, the Royal River's four waterfalls within Yarmouth, whose Main Street sits about 90 feet (27 m) above sea level, resulted in the foundation of almost sixty mills between 1674 and 1931. The annual Yarmouth Clam Festival attracts around 80,000 people (around ten times the town's population) over the course of the three-day weekend.

== History ==
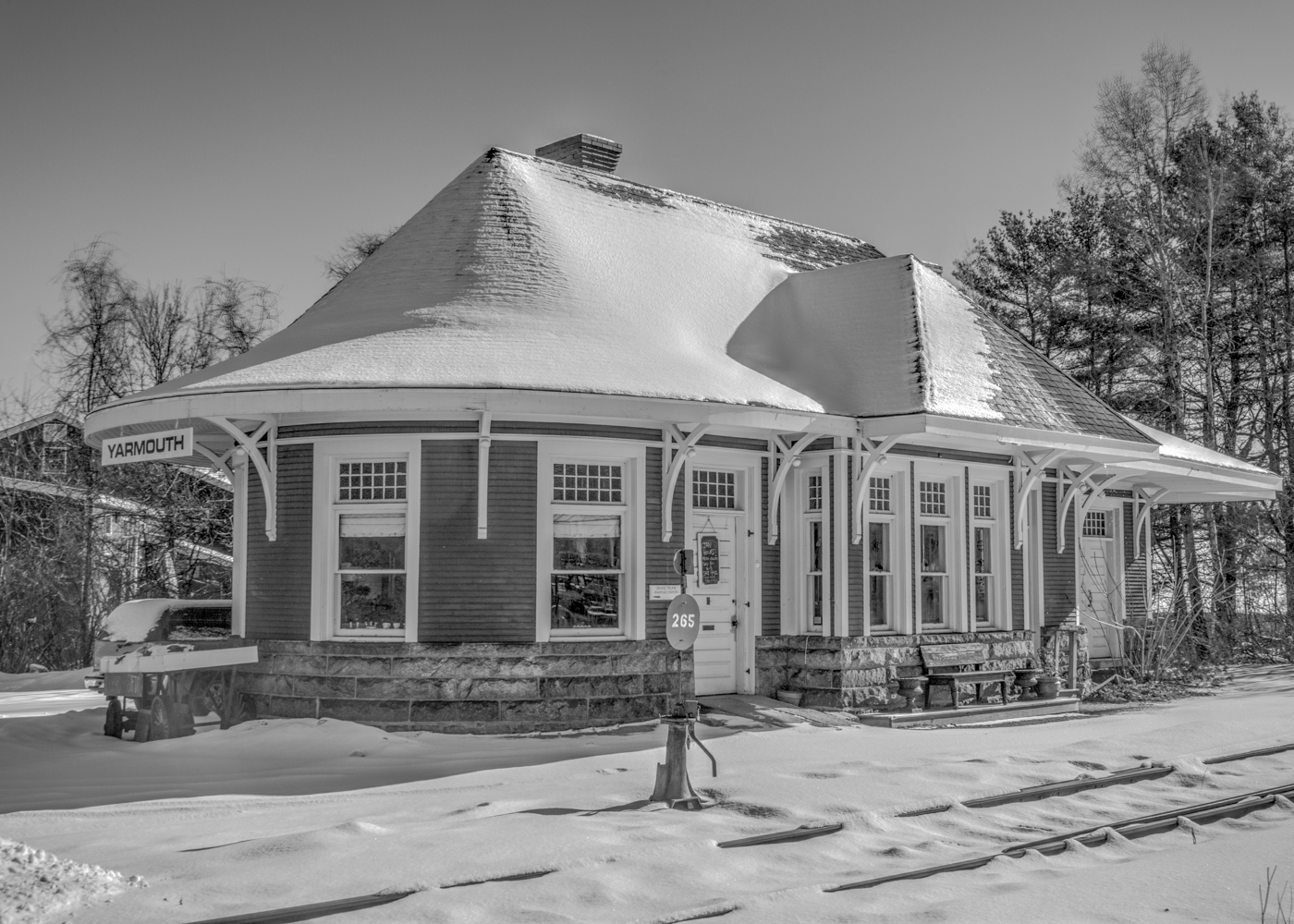
Grand Trunk Railway Station (1906), now occupied by a savings bank

North Yarmouth, Massachusetts Bay Colony (as it then was), was settled in 1636, although Native Americans had already been living in the area, calling it Westcustogo. Englishman William Royall (c. 1595–1676), for whom the Royal River is named, emigrated to Salem in 1629. After serving seven years in the Massachusetts Bay Colony Company, he was provided with a land grant in North Yarmouth. He purchased a farm there in 1636, becoming one of the first European settlers of the town, along with John Cousins.

Another Englishman, George Felt, who had emigrated to Charlestown, Massachusetts Bay Colony, eleven years earlier, purchased 300 acres of land at Broad Cove from John Phillips, a Welshman, in 1643. In 1652, John Cousins sold "sixty acres of lands with fenced fields" to John Maine, from whom the western end of town took the name of Maine's Point.

In June 1675, the local Native Americans began a "war of extermination" against the settlers who were encroaching on their fishing ground. What is now known as Lanes Island, the first island at the mouth of the Royal River, was their council ground, and its western end their burial ground. James Lane was the first of their victims, followed the next day by two sons of Mr. Hazelton, who had recently purchased the remaining half of Cousins Island. They were hunting cattle in the woods when they were captured. Locally, William Royall's fort was destroyed and the mills were burned. More broadly, King Philip's War (1675–1678) caused settlers to abandon their homes and move south. After a brief period of peace, the Second Indian War broke out in 1688 and lasted for nine years. This unrest continued periodically until around 1756, ending with the Means massacre at Flying Point.

Around 1715, the third, and the earliest permanent, settlement in Yarmouth began. Seven years later, a "Committee for the Resettlement of North Yarmouth" was formed in Boston, Province of Massachusetts Bay.

By 1764, 1,098 individuals lived in 154 houses. By 1810, the population was 3,295. During a time of peace, settlement began to relocate along the coast and inland. The town's Main Street gradually became divided into the Upper Village (also known as the Corner) and Lower Falls, the split roughly located around the present-day U.S. Route 1 overpass (Brickyard Hollow, as it was known). Among the new proprietors at the time were descendants of the Plymouth Pilgrims.

The Town of Yarmouth was incorporated on August 8, 1849 (177 years ago). Maritime activities were important from the beginning of the third settlement. Almost three hundred vessels were launched by Yarmouth's shipyards in the century between 1790 and 1890.

=== National Register of Historic Places ===
Twelve properties in Yarmouth are listed on the National Register of Historic Places. The oldest (the Cushing and Hannah Prince House) dates from 1785; the most recent (the Grand Trunk Railway Station) was built in 1906, replacing a structure built in 1848. They are ranked in order of construction below.

- Cushing and Hannah Prince House (built in 1785), 189 Greely Road
- North Yarmouth and Freeport Baptist Meeting House (1796), 3 Hillside Street
- Ammi Mitchell House (c. 1800), 333 Main Street
- Russell Hall (1841), North Yarmouth Academy, 141 Main Street
- Academy Hall (1847), North Yarmouth Academy, 129 Main Street
- Captain S. C. Blanchard House (1855), 317 Main Street
- Captain Reuben Merrill House (1858), 233 West Main Street
- First Universalist Church (1859), 97 Main Street
- First Parish Congregational Church (1867), 116 Main Street
- Camp Hammond (1889), 275 Main Street
- Cousins Island Chapel (1895), 414 Cousins Street
- Grand Trunk Station (1906), 288 Main Street

== Geography ==
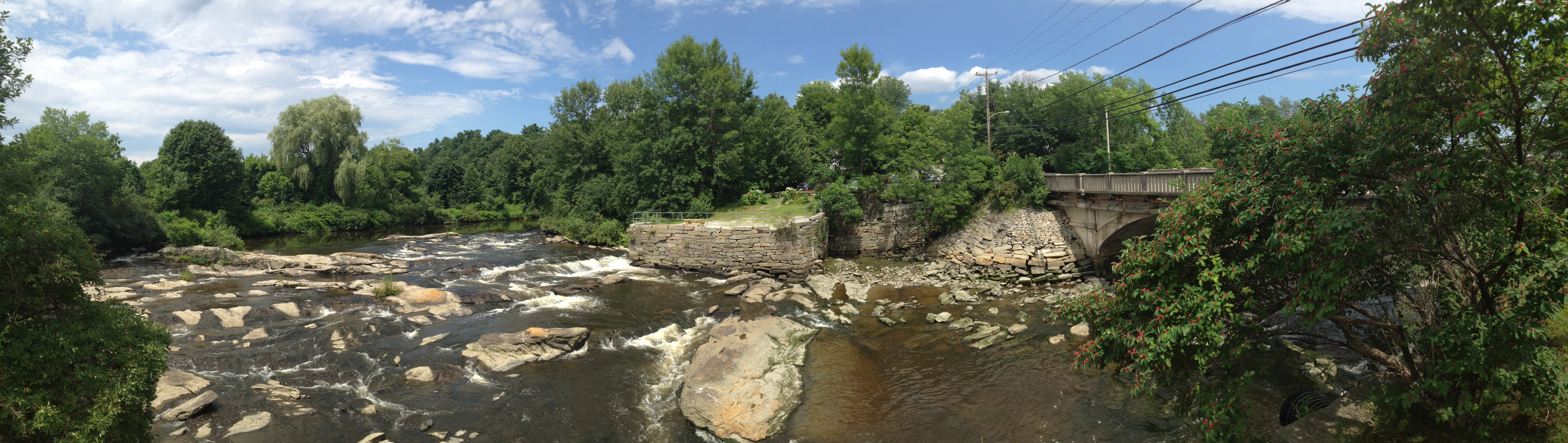
Grist Mill Park, viewed from the bottom of the Main Street hill at the First Falls

According to the United States Census Bureau, the town has a total area of 22.94 square miles (59.41 km^{2}), of which 13.35 square miles (34.58 km^{2}) (58%) is land and 9.59 square miles (24.84 km^{2}) (42%) is water.

Yarmouth is nearly square in form and is bisected by the Royal River. The town is bounded by Freeport to the north (with the Cousins River separating them), North Yarmouth to the northeast, Cumberland to the west and Casco Bay to the south. Also included as part of the town are Cousins Island, Lanes Island, Great and Little Moshier Islands and Littlejohn Island.

The Royal River appealed to settlers because its four waterfalls and 45 feet (14 m) rise, within a mile of navigable water, each provided potential waterpower sites. In October 1674, the first sawmill, of Englishman Henry Sayward and Colonel Bartholomew Gedney, was built on the East Main Street (Maine State Route 88) side of the First Falls, where Grist Mill Park is today. (It was abandoned two years later, however, due to conflicts with the Native Americans during the early stages of King Philip's War.) The Second Falls are just west of Bridge Street; the Third Falls are within the bounds of Royal River Park; and the Fourth Falls are near the intersection of East Elm Street and Melissa Drive.

The first of the waterfalls are located less than a mile from the mouth of the Royal River at Yarmouth's harbor. One of the town's two remaining mill buildings stands near here, at 1 Main Street, at the foot of the Staples Hill. The other, Sparhawk Mill, is located approximately 0.35 miles (0.56 km) upstream at the Second Falls. The Third (or Baker) Falls were, by far, the most industrious of the four. Forest Paper Company was in operation there between 1874 and 1923. In 1901, it was the largest pulp and paper mill in the world. Also known as Upper Falls or Gooch's Falls, the Fourth Falls are located around 0.4 miles (0.64 km) upstream of the Third Falls.

In 2025, the town's council voted unanimously to remove the dams at the Second and Fourth Falls to improve ecology.

Since 1674, fifty-seven mills and several factories have stood on the banks of the river, producing grain, lumber, pulp and cotton. The factories manufactured paper, shoes, bricks and, in 1908, power, courtesy of Yarmouth Electric Company.

Yarmouth's coastline is composed of two main coves: White's Cove (north of Cousins Island's Snodgrass Bridge) and Broad Cove (from Sunset Point due east to State Route 88).

== Demographics ==
Historical population
| Census | Pop. | Note | %± |
|---|---|---|---|
| 1850 | 2,144 | | — |
| 1860 | 2,027 | | −5.5% |
| 1870 | 1,872 | | −7.6% |
| 1880 | 2,021 | | 8.0% |
| 1890 | 2,098 | | 3.8% |
| 1900 | 2,274 | | 8.4% |
| 1910 | 2,358 | | 3.7% |
| 1920 | 2,216 | | −6.0% |
| 1930 | 2,125 | | −4.1% |
| 1940 | 2,214 | | 4.2% |
| 1950 | 2,669 | | 20.6% |
| 1960 | 3,517 | | 31.8% |
| 1970 | 4,854 | | 38.0% |
| 1980 | 6,585 | | 35.7% |
| 1990 | 7,862 | | 19.4% |
| 2000 | 8,360 | | 6.3% |
| 2010 | 8,349 | | −0.1% |
| 2020 | 8,990 | | 7.7% |
U.S. Decennial Census; Raymond H. Fogler Library; 2012 Estimate

=== 2010 census ===
As of the census of 2010, there were 8,349 people, 3,522 households, and 2,317 families residing in the town. The population density was 625.4 inhabitants per square mile (241.5/km^{2}), which put Yarmouth fourth behind Portland, South Portland and Westbrook in population density.

There were 3,819 housing units at an average density of 286.1 units per square mile (110.5 units/km^{2}). The racial makeup of the town was 96.9% White, 0.5% African American, 0.2% Native American, 1.2% Asian, 0.2% from other races, and 1.0% from two or more races. Hispanic or Latino of any race were 1.2% of the population.

There were 3,522 households, of which 30.1% had children under the age of 18 living with them, 54.6% were married couples living together, 8.5% had a female householder with no husband present, 2.7% had a male householder with no wife present, and 34.2% were non-families. 27.5% of all households were made up of individuals, and 11.7% had someone living alone who was 65 years of age or older. The average household size was 2.34 and the average family size was 2.87.

The median age in the town was 45.9 years. 22.8% of residents were under the age of 18; 5.6% were between the ages of 18 and 24; 20% were from 25 to 44; 34.9% were from 45 to 64; and 16.7% were 65 years of age or older. The gender makeup of the town was 47.1% male and 52.9% female.

=== 2000 census ===
As of the census of 2000, there were 8,360 people, 3,432 households, and 2,306 families residing in the town. The population density was 626.7 inhabitants per square mile (242.0/km^{2}). There were 3,704 housing units at an average density of 277.7 units per square mile (107.2 units/km^{2}). The racial makeup of the town was 98.49% White, 0.37% Black or African American, 0.04% Native American, 0.36% Asian, 0.02% Pacific Islander, 0.22% from other races, and 0.50% from two or more races. Hispanic or Latino of any race were 0.59% of the population.

There were 3,402 households, out of which 33% had children under the age of 18 living with them, 57.2% were married couples living together, 7.7% had a female householder with no husband present, and 32.8% were non-families. 27.4% of all households were made up of individuals, and 10.7% had someone living alone who was 65 years of age or older. The average household size was 2.41 and the average family size was 2.96.

In the town, the population was spread out, with 24.6% under the age of 18, 5.4% from 18 to 24, 26.3% from 25 to 44, 29.0% from 45 to 64, and 14.6% who were 65 years of age or older. The median age was 42 years. For every 100 females, there were 92.5 males. For every 100 females age 18 and over, there were 86.6 males.

The median income for a household in the town was $58,030, and the median income for a family was $73,234. Males had a median income of $48,456 versus $34,075 for females. The per capita income for the town was $34,317. About 4.0% of families and 4.4% of the population were below the poverty line, including 5.2% of those under age 18 and 4.3% of those age 65 or over.

=== Crime ===
Yarmouth is safer than 77% of U.S. cities. Violent crime is well below the national average for all communities of all population sizes.

On April 18, 2023, three people were wounded in a suspected random shooting on Interstate 295, after the gunman allegedly shot dead four people in Bowdoin earlier that day.

== Economy ==
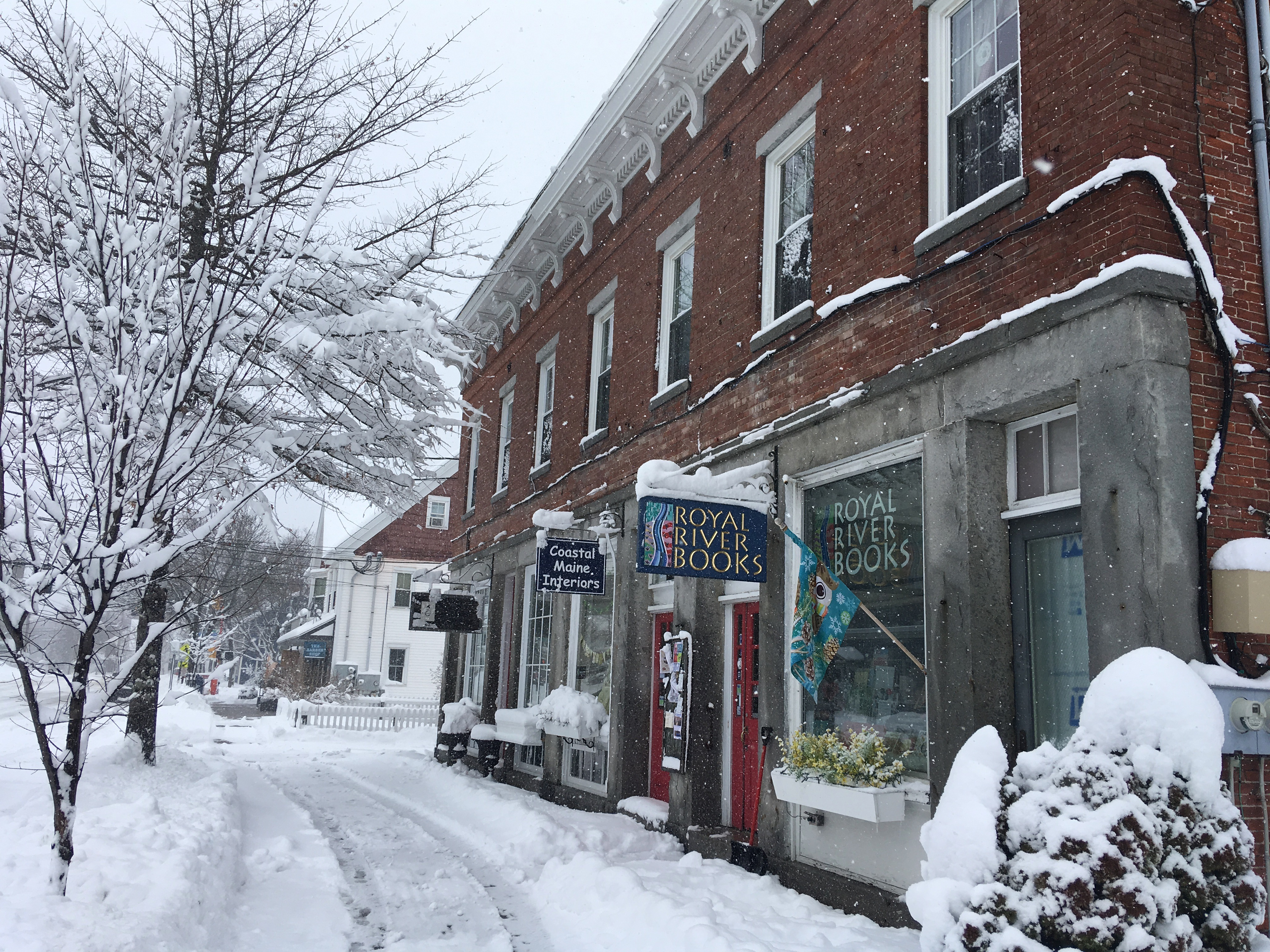
Yarmouth's Upper Village in 2017

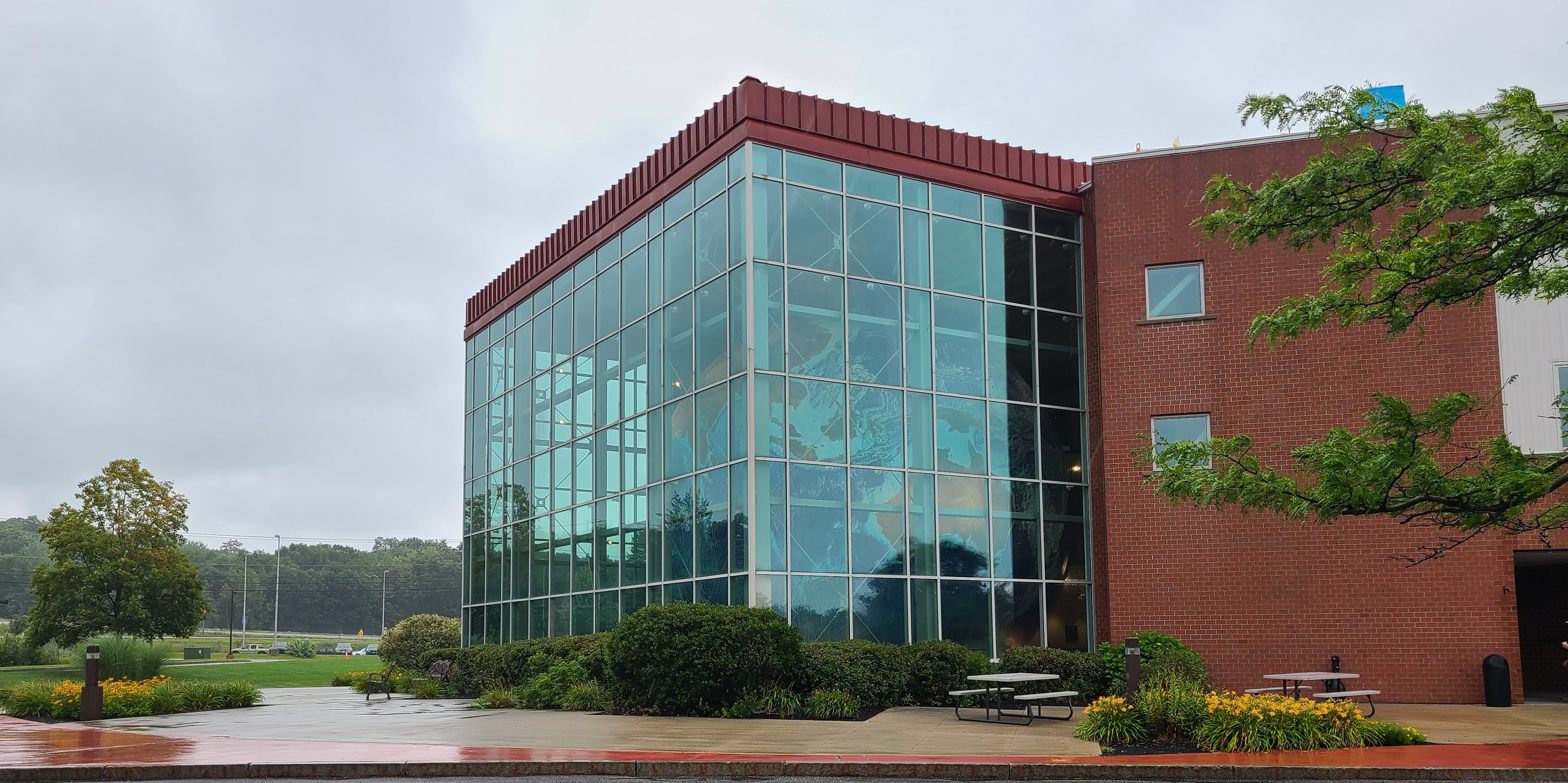
Garmin houses Eartha, the largest rotating globe

Yarmouth was home to DeLorme, the large map-making company, with its headquarters, located on Route 1 to the north of the town, housing Eartha, the world's largest revolving and rotating globe. In 2016, DeLorme was purchased by Garmin.

A notable former establishment was Bill's Home Style Sandwiches. It was a lunchtime mainstay for many locals for 35 years (from 1974 to 2009), run by Bill Kinsman.

The oil-powered Wyman Power Station, located on the southwestern tip of Cousins Island, is part of Central Maine Power (CMP).

Yarmouth has no hotel or motel accommodation. The last one, the Down-East Village Restaurant & Motel, was demolished in 2017 to make way for a Patriot Insurance building at 701 Route One. The Down-East was, in 1950, the second motel built in Maine and eventually became the oldest.

The Royal River Cabins was in business between 1934 and 1950 on the ocean side of Spring Street, at its split with East Main Street. The enterprise began as an inn in the property at 51 East Main Street, which now houses W. M. Schwind Antiques. Eleanor Roosevelt and her entourage once stayed in a cabin here because the Eastland Park Hotel in Portland would not permit her dog, Fala, to stay in the hotel. The president's wife chose to dine at the Westcustogo Inn. Also at this fork in the road once stood Jim Brewer Dennison's blacksmith shop, which he set up in 1863. His son, William, worked with him. Adjacent to the forge was Florence Sewing Machines repair shop.

A drive-in theater once stood where the Hannaford plaza now is.

In 2019, the town approved a final draft of a "streetscape improvement plan" for the Main Street village first discussed in July the previous year. Phase 1 (between Elm and Mill Streets) was begun in April 2021; phase 2 (Center Street to Yarmouth Crossing) was in development in May 2023.

== Arts and culture ==
=== Yarmouth Clam Festival ===
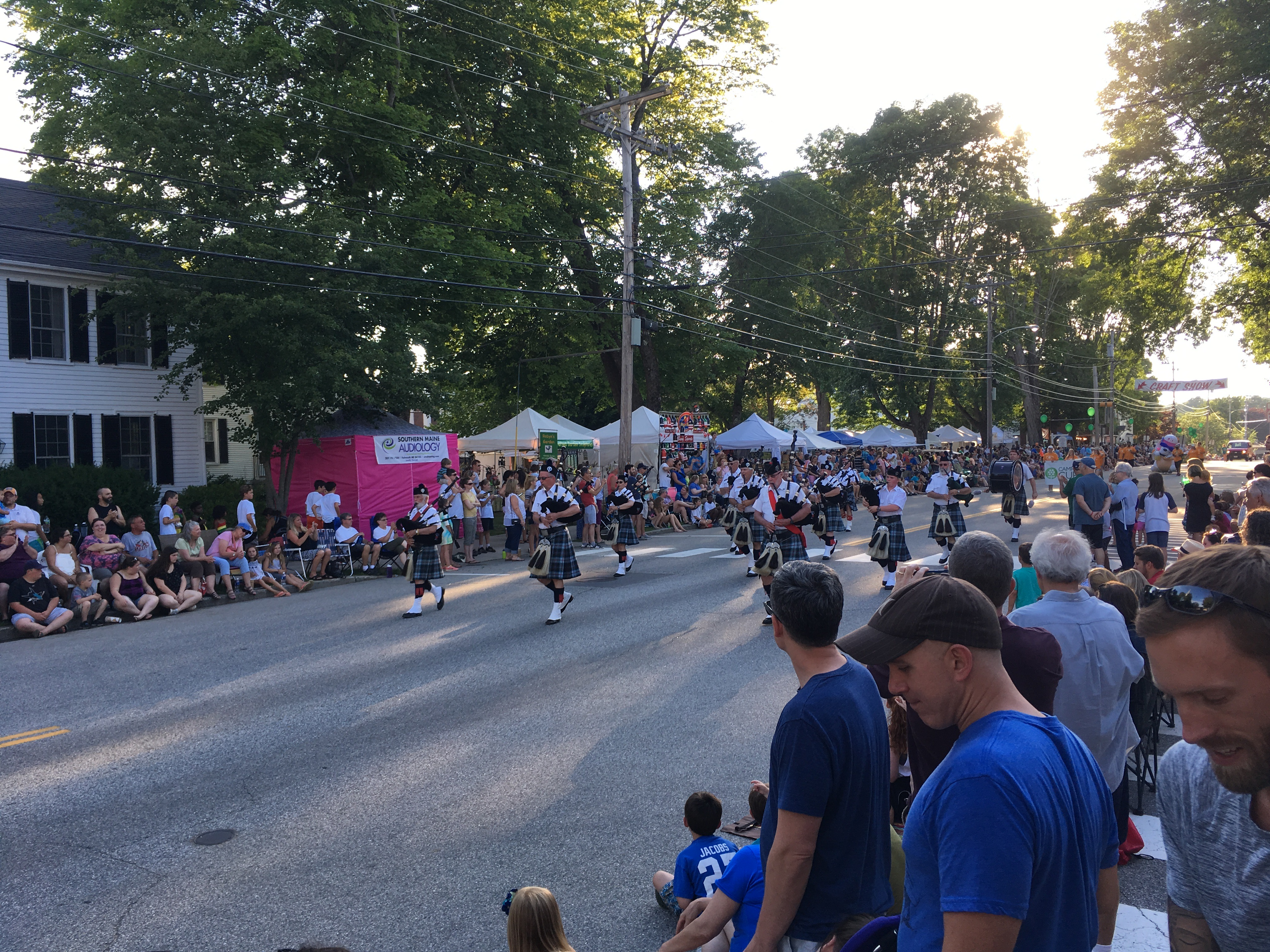
Yarmouth Clam Festival parade

Established in 1965, the Yarmouth Clam Festival is an annual three-day event which takes place in the town during the third weekend in July, attracting around 120,000 people. The festival features a parade, food, carnival rides, crafts, a clam-shucking contest, a five-mile run, and a world-class bike race.

=== "Herbie" ===
"Herbie" was an elm tree that stood by present-day East Main Street (Route 88), at its intersection with Yankee Drive, between 1793 and 2010. At 110 feet in height, it was, between 1997 and the date of its felling, the oldest and largest of its kind in New England. The tree, which partially stood in the front yard of a private residence, also had a 20-foot circumference and (until mid-2008) a 93-foot crown spread.

Pownal native Frank Knight, Herbie's "warden", died in May 2012 at the age of 103. His coffin was made from the wood of the tree he looked after for over fifty years. Frank Knight Forest, on East Main Street, was named in his honor.

=== Churches ===
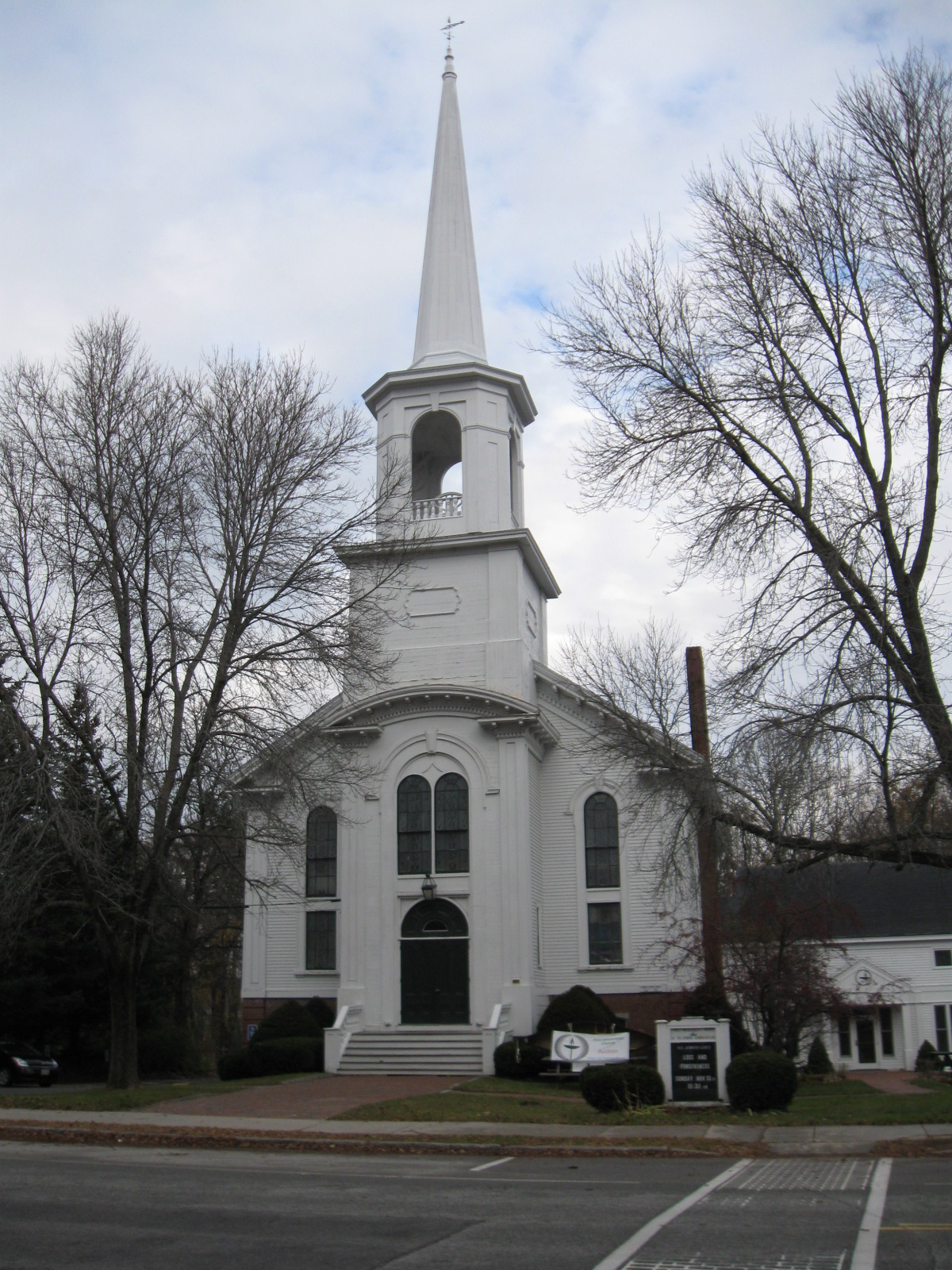
First Universalist Church, built in 1860

There are eight churches in Yarmouth. Four of these are located on Main Street. They are (from east to west):

- First Universalist Church, 97 Main Street (built in 1860). Designed by Thomas Holt for an Orthodox Congregational parish; became its current denomination in 1886. The site was formerly occupied by Jenks's Tavern
- First Parish Congregational Church, 116 Main Street (built in 1867). Designed by Portland architect George M. Harding. The third incarnation of churches built for the town's Congregationalists. Charles Augustus Aiken was ordained a pastor here in 1854
- Sacred Heart Catholic Church, 326 Main Street (built in 1929 from granite quarried in North Yarmouth)
- First Baptist Church, 346 Main Street (built in 1889; designed by John Calvin Stevens)

Elsewhere, the North Yarmouth and Freeport Baptist Meeting House (known locally as the Meetinghouse on the Hill) on Hillside Street was built in 1796. It has been twice altered: by Samuel Melcher in 1825 and by Anthony Raymond twelve years later. It ceased being used as a church in 1889, when its congregation moved to the structure now on Main Street. The 1805 bell was transferred to the new home. The meeting house was unused for less than a year. It was purchased for $1,000 and converted into the town's first library and antiquarian society and known as Yarmouth Memorial Hall. It was donated to the town in 1910 and used for town meetings until 1946, at which point they were moved to the Log Cabin on Main Street. During World War II, the belfry was used an airplane-spotting outlook post in the Civil Defense System. Twelve townsfolk per day staffed the tower in two-hour shifts. In 1946, the Village Improvement Society (founded in 1911) agreed to maintain the interior of the meeting house. In 2001, the town and the society restored the building, from its granite foundation to the barrel-vaulted ceiling. A non-denominational church service is held here during the town's Clam Festival. The building is owned by the Yarmouth Village Improvement Society.

St. Bartholomew's Episcopal is at 396 Gilman Road, heading towards Cousins Island. It was built in 1988.

Royal River Baptist Church is in Yarmouth Marketplace at 438 Route One.

Cousins Island Chapel (1895) has been holding non-denominational services since 1954 in a former Baptist church. The Church of the Nazarene on Route 1 became inactive in June 2012 and was demolished in the spring of 2015.

=== Graveyards and cemeteries ===
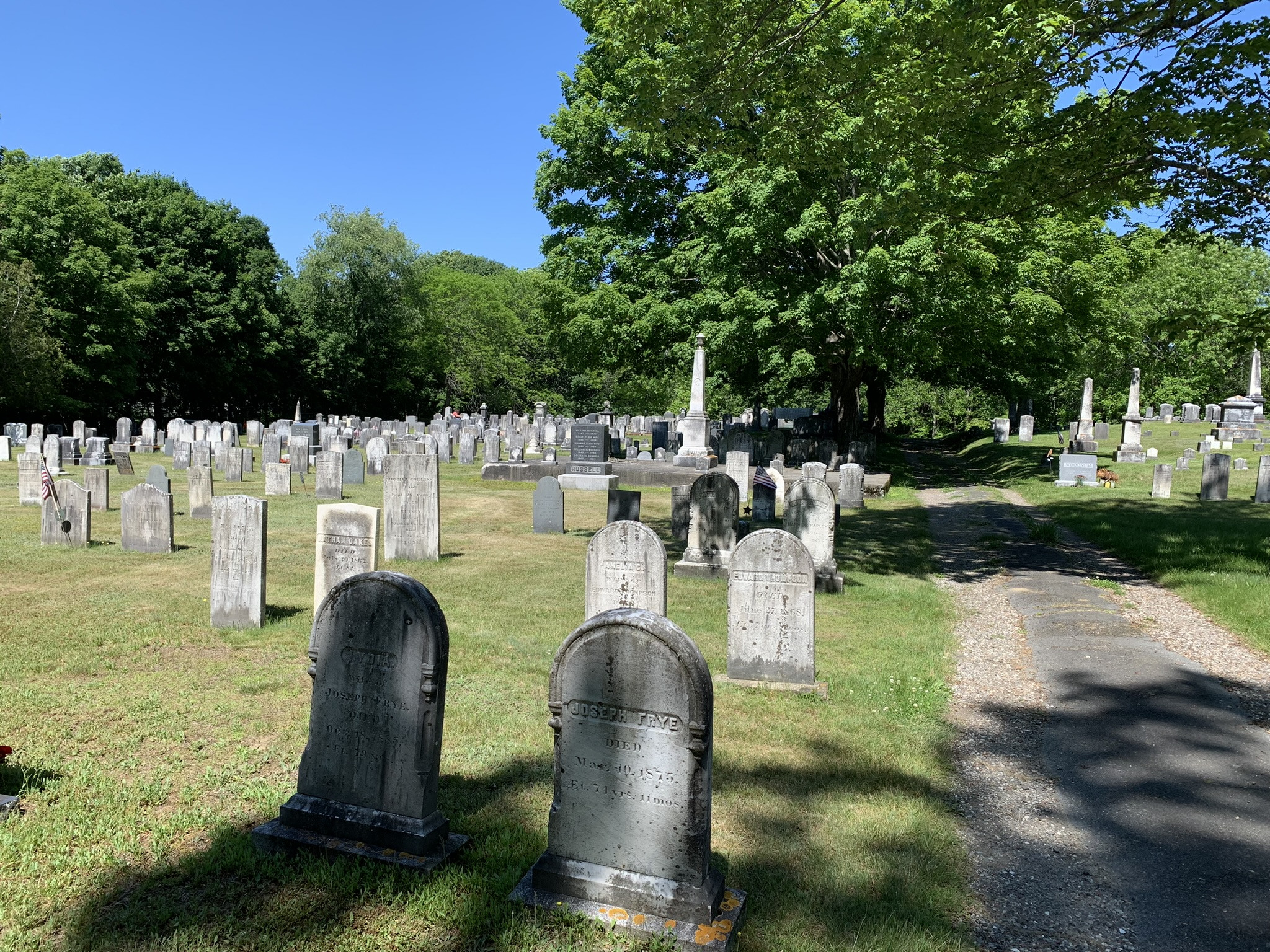
Davis Cemetery, Granite Street

The only graveyard (that is, a burial ground associated with an extant church building) in Yarmouth is located beside the Meeting House on Hillside Street. It is known as the Old Baptist Cemetery.

Two cemeteries are located near the former site of the "Old Ledge" Meeting House on Lafayette Street: a small, 0.5-acre (0.20 ha) 1731 Pioneer Cemetery (also known as the Indian Fighters cemetery), which was the first public burial place in Old North Yarmouth, and the 2.5-acre 1770 Ledge Cemetery (some headstones bear dates earlier than 1770, for many bodies were removed from the older cemetery). The family of Captain Nicholas Drinkwater Jr. is buried in the latter location, in a communal plot also containing his wife, Margaret, his son, Joshua, and Joshua's wife and Boston native, Harriet. Their daughter, Elizabeth, is interred in Riverside Cemetery with her daughter, Alfreda, and husband, Alfred, who died just before their daughter was born.

Two other cemeteries in town—Riverside and Holy Cross—are located adjacent to each other, at the eastern end of Smith Street. It is in the 1869-founded Riverside Cemetery that several prominent early business owners and other townspeople are buried, including Leon Gorman. Holy Cross, a Catholic-denomination cemetery, is affiliated with Falmouth's Parish of the Holy Eucharist. The Jacob Mitchell garrison was located at the rear of Holy Cross. The dirt path that looks like it leads to the water is actually the original stage road. Mitchell's family lived in the house between around 1729 and 1799. It then became the home of the Whitcombs, whose name is preserved on a street name off Princes Point Road. It was demolished about 1900 and the farm land was purchased in 1916 to become Holy Cross cemetery.

Davis Cemetery is located on the section of Granite Street to the south of East Main Street and Old County Road, an area known as Sodom historically. John Davis (died 1798) is the oldest known burial in the cemetery.

Cousins Island Cemetery is located at the corner of Cousins Street and Hillcrest Avenue on the island. There are around eighteen unmarked graves of early settlers here. There is also a small cemetery, known as Hill Cemetery, within the confines of the adjacent Tinker Preserve.

In 2026, Yarmouth Historical Society added five cemeteries to its historic districts. They are (in order of age) the Pioneer Cemetery, Ledge Cemetery, Old Baptist Cemetery, Riverside Cemetery and Holy Cross Cemetery.

== Parks and recreation ==
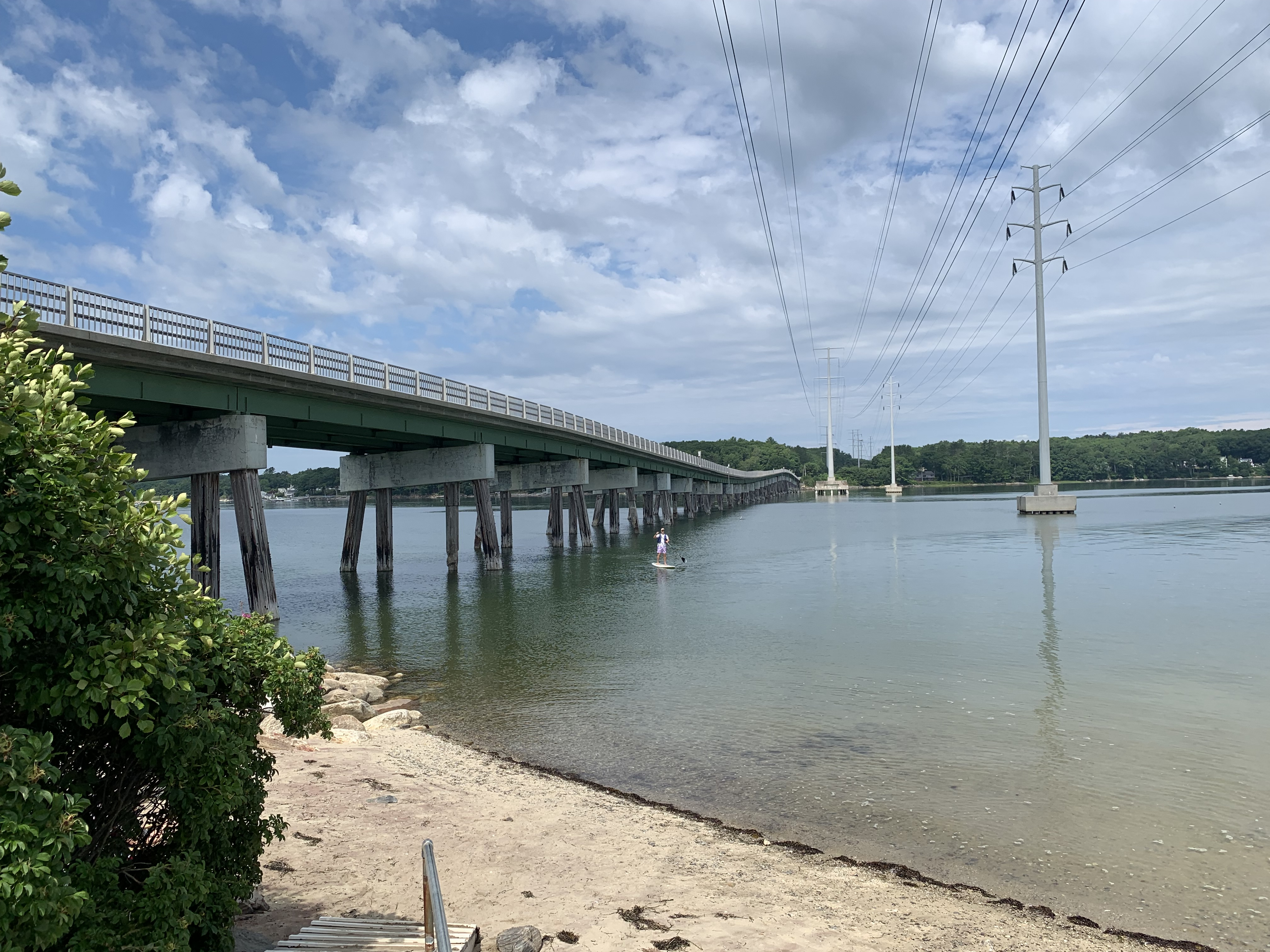
Sandy Point Beach at high tide, looking back to the mainland

=== Parks ===
- Grist Mill Park, East Main Street
- Village Green Park, Main Street
- Latchstring Park, Main Street and West Elm Street
- Royal River Park, between East Elm Street and Bridge Street
- Pratt's Brook Park, North Road

=== Open spaces and conservation land ===
Spear Farm Estuary Preserve

- Grist Mill Lane Field (formerly an intervale owned by Edward Russell before 1836)
- Spear Farm Estuary Preserve, Bayview Street
- Fels-Groves Farm Preserve, Gilman Road
- Larrabee's Landing, Burbank Lane
- Frank Knight Forest, East Main Street
- Cousins River Fields and Marsh Project, Granite Street
- Barker Preserve, between East Elm Street and Royal River
- Riverfront Woods Preserve, River Front Drive
- Sligo Road Property
- Sweetsir Farm, Old Field Road
- Camp SOCI, Sandy Point Road, Cousins Island (established in 1957)
- Sandy Point Beach, Cousins Street, Cousins Island
- Katherine Tinker Preserve, Seal Lane, Cousins Island
- Littlejohn Island Preserve, Pemasong Lane, Littlejohn Island

=== Trails ===
- West Side Trail
- Spears Hill Trail, Broad Cove

=== Beth Condon Memorial Pathway ===
A recreation path that originates on the western side of the Portland Street and Route 1 intersection. It is named after 15-year-old Yarmouth High School sophomore Elizabeth Ann Condon, who was killed by drunk driver Martha Burke on August 28, 1993, as she walked along Route 1 with her boyfriend.

== Education ==
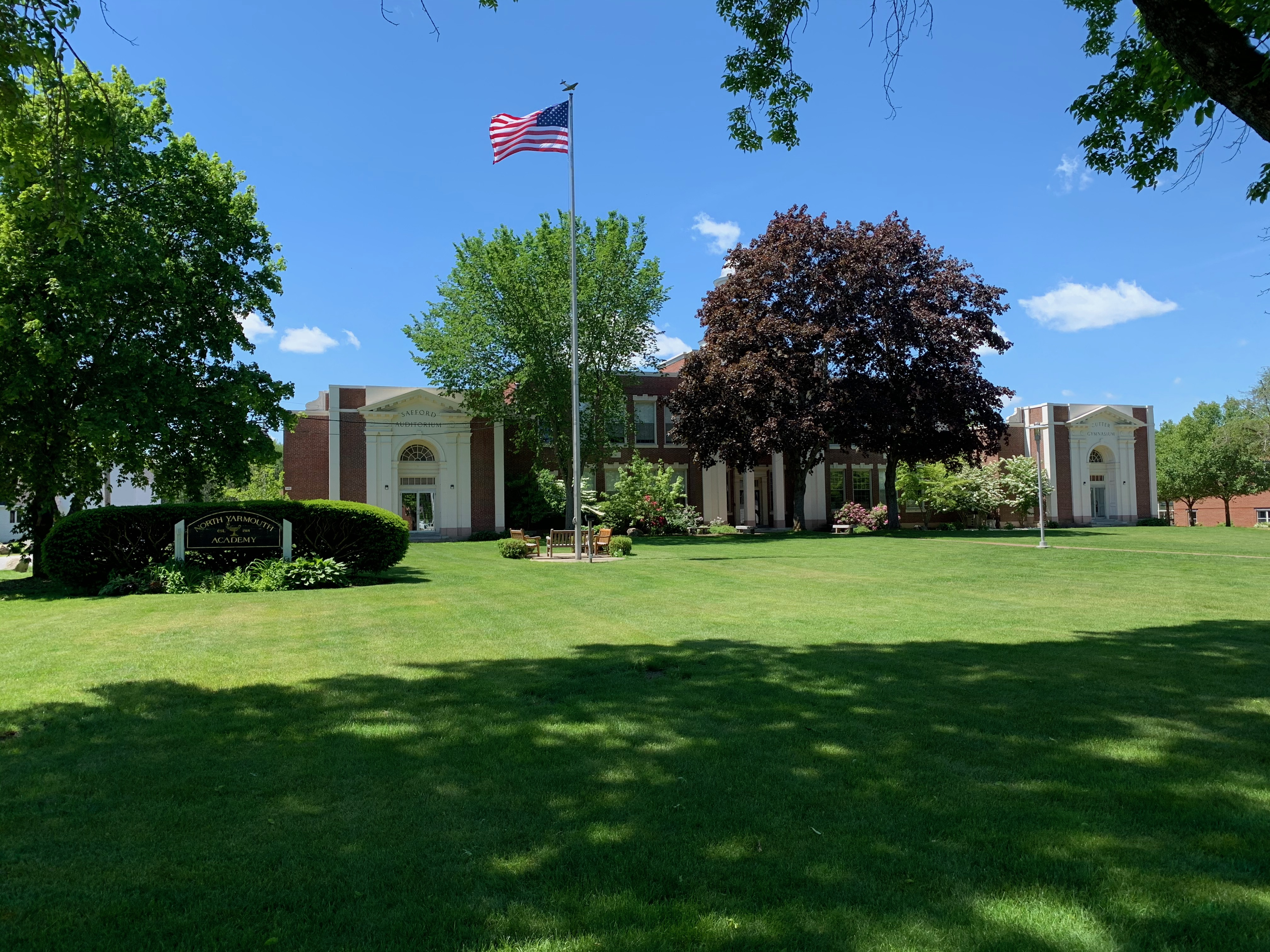
North Yarmouth Academy. The main building is flanked by Safford Auditorium (left) and Cutter Gymnasium (right)

The town has four public schools:

- William H. Rowe (Elementary) School (named for William Hutchinson Rowe; built 1955; rebuilt in 2003)
- Yarmouth Elementary School (built 1968; named Yarmouth Intermediate School until 1992)
- Frank H. Harrison Middle School (built 1992)
- Yarmouth High School (built 1961; rebuilt in 2002)

Three of the four schools are located within half a mile of each other: Yarmouth Elementary and Harrison Middle are both on McCartney Street, while the high school is located across the adjoining West Elm Street. Rowe is located about two miles to the north east, on School Street.

The two elementary schools are unique in that the William H. Rowe School caters to students in kindergarten and the first grade, while Yarmouth Elementary educates second through fourth graders. Yarmouth High School was named #297 in the 1,000 Best High Schools in the US by Newsweek in 2005 and #289 in 2006. In 2013, U.S. News & World Report ranked Yarmouth High School first in Maine and 198th in the country.

On the southern side of Main Street, near its junction with Bridge Street, is North Yarmouth Academy (NYA), a private college preparatory school established in 1814. Across the street stand, in the Greek Revival style, Russell Hall (1841) and Academy Hall (1847). They are built of brick with granite and wood trim. Russell Hall was originally a dormitory and Academy Hall a classroom; they are now both of the latter use. By the early 1930s, the academy expanded into new facilities across the street.

NYA became a private school in 1961, when Yarmouth High School was built on West Elm Street.

On October 17, 1998, the academy's ice arena was renamed in honor of Travis Roy, an alumnus of NYA who was rendered a quadriplegic after an injury he sustained while playing for Boston University men's ice hockey team in 1995. He died in 2020, aged 45.

A former school, District Number 3, still stands at 12 Portland Street. It is now a business.

== Media ==
An early town newspaper was the Eastern Gazette, which was first printed by E.G. Crabtree in July 1886. His office was in the second storey of the Vining store. Financial support was not forthcoming, however, hence its life was short.

The town later had its own page, the Yarmouth Gazette, in the "lost but not forgotten institution" the Six Towns Times, which was published weekly from 1892 until 1916.

Yarmouth news is now reported regularly in a number of different newspapers, including the Portland Press Herald and The Forecaster (Northern Edition). The Notes was published in Yarmouth between 1953 and 2021. The Yarmouth Historical Society began digitizing the newspaper's archives in 2022, the archiving done by Advantage Archives in Cedar Rapids, Iowa.

The town is home to one radio station, WYAR, which was founded in 1998 and broadcasts from Cousins Island.

== Transportation ==
=== Road ===
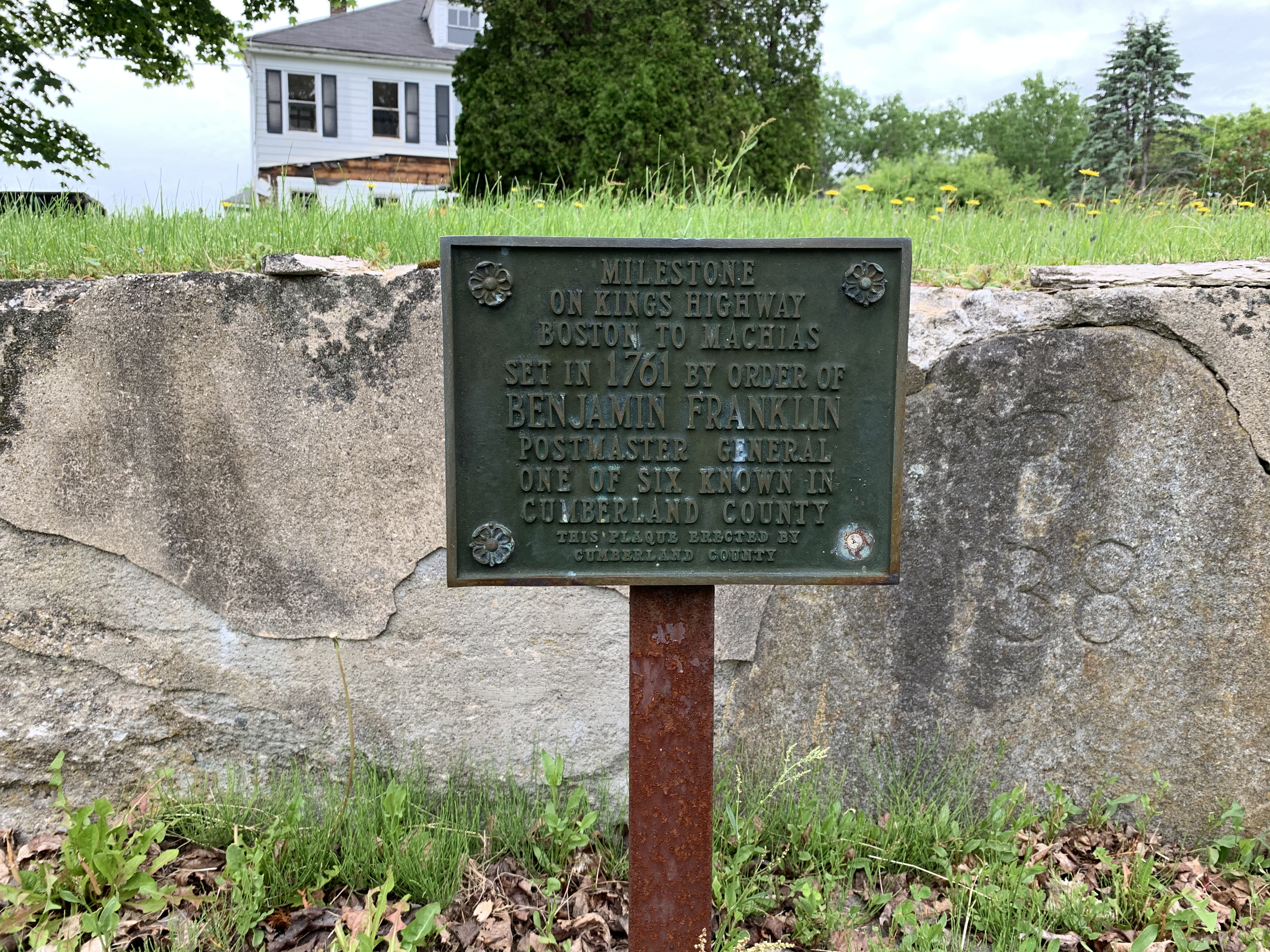
A milestone on the Boston-to-Machias "King's Highway" route. The milestone, now incorporated into a wall, is engraved with "B 138," to denote its distance of 138 miles from Boston. It is located on Pleasant Street

In 1727, five local men—Samuel Seabury, James Parker, Jacob Mitchell, Gershom Rice and Phineas Jones—were tasked with the management of the new town. Their affairs included laying out the highways. Roads (or, at least, routes) that appeared on subsequent maps are mentioned below with today's names.

In 1732, "a good road (today's Pleasant Street) was built over the ledge from the meeting-house to the mills at the first falls which, although it was abandoned about 1800 for a less hilly course, may still be easily traced." Other roads introduced included Atlantic Highway (now State Route 88), Gilman Road, Princes Point Road, Highlands Farm Road (leading to Parker's Point), Drinkwater Point Road (which led to two wharves), Morton Road and Old Town Landing Road (which led to another wharf). Large lot owners at the time included Walter Gendall, whose farm incorporated Duck Cove, beyond Town Landing Road in today's Cumberland Foreside (Cumberland was not incorporated as its own town until 1821). Its dry-stone boundary is still intact. Gendall lived there with his wife, Joane. This large farm remained in his possession until his death in 1688. Welshman John Powell had a farm where today's Schooner Ridge Road is. John Dabney's 60-acre lot abutted this to the east. Dabney was a town selectman in 1737. Felt had a lot at the foot of the northern end of Pleasant Street, adjacent to Stony Brook. Royall's farm, meanwhile, occupied the entire area bisected by Bayview Street. Some of Royall's land at the point was later transferred to the Browns, in whose family it remained for over three hundred years. It is now known as Brown's Point.

Smith Street became an uninterrupted offshoot from Pleasant Street, eventually leading to Riverside Cemetery when it was established in 1869, until the Lafayette Street hill was built in the early 19th century.

In 1756, "to accommodate the teams hauling lumber from the great pine forests inland to the seaboard, a new, more convenient way was laid out by the way of Walnut Hill and the road constructed."

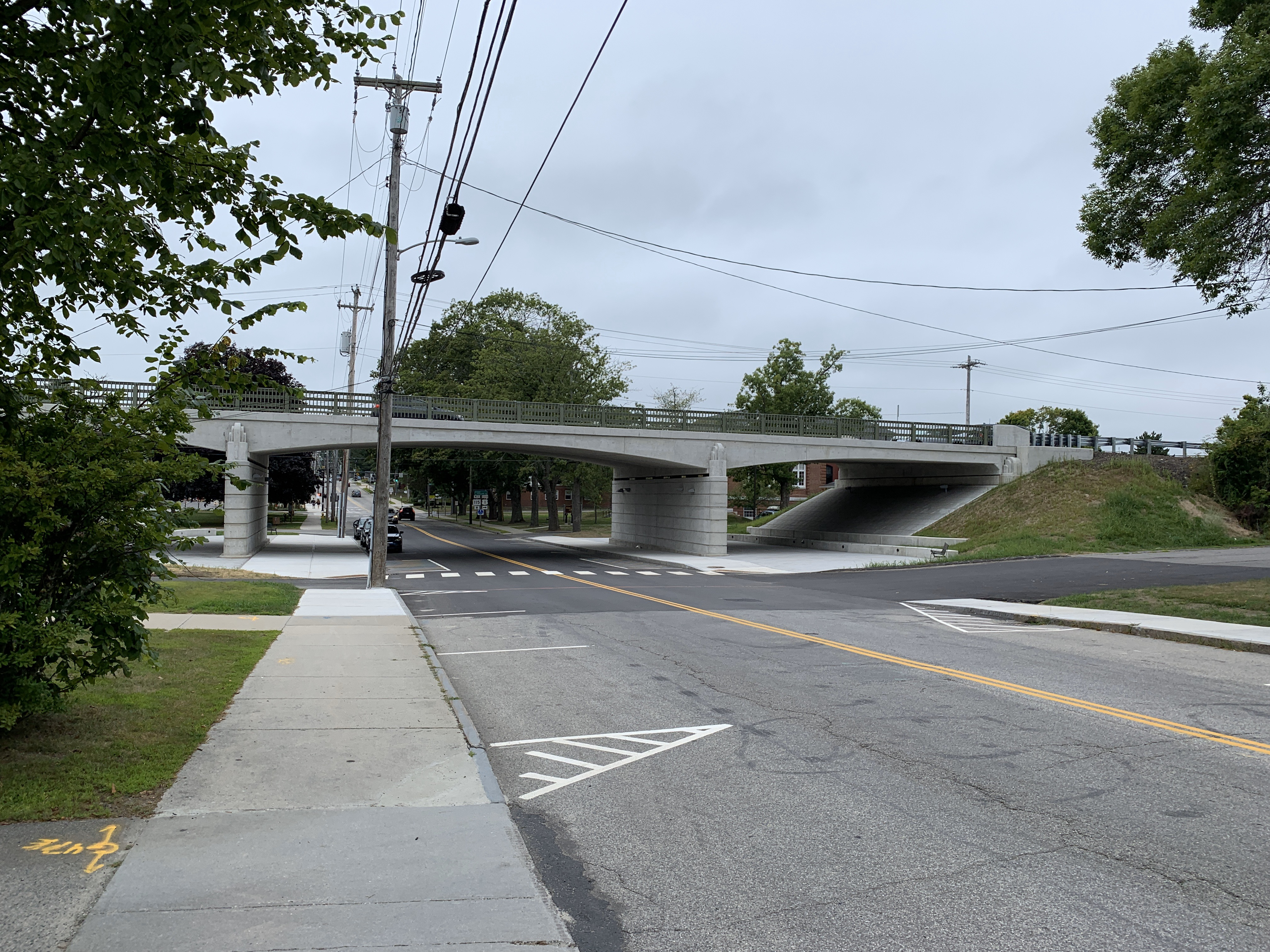
Looking west toward Main Street's Route 1 overpass and Brickyard Hollow in August 2019. This bridge was rebuilt between late 2017 and August 2019, replacing a structure from the 1950s

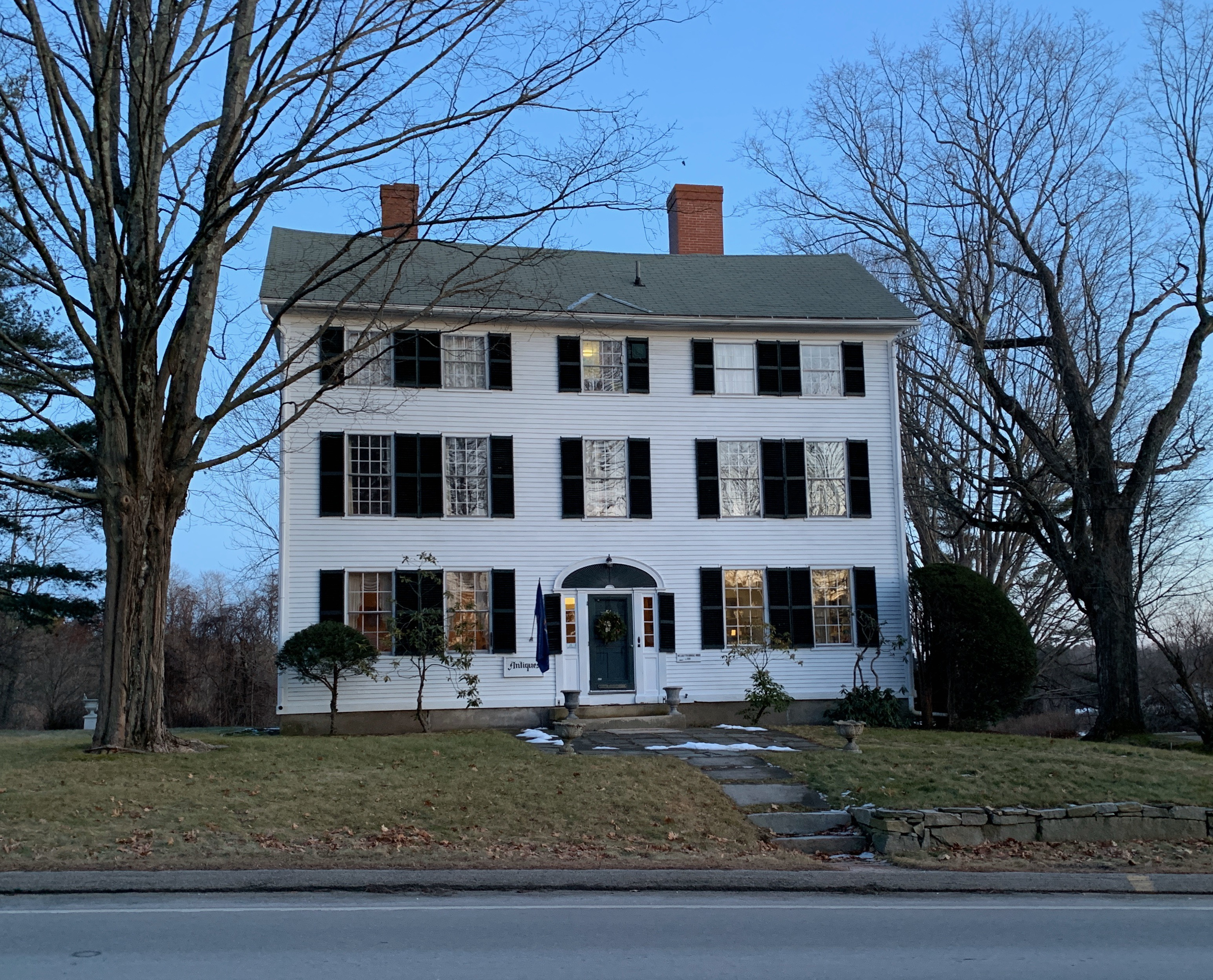
General Lafayette once stayed in the three-storey building at 51 East Main Street, erected in 1810

In 1761, then-Postmaster General Benjamin Franklin ordered milestones placed along the 1673-established route from Boston, Massachusetts, to Machias, Maine, as a northern extension of King's Highway. It was established to address the need for a reliable route between New York and Boston initially, and later between Boston and northern locations. There are six of these stones within Cumberland County, three of which (numbers 137, 138 and 139) are in Yarmouth: one on Route 88, just south of Ravine Drive on the western side of the road, and one "1.1 miles" away (due to today's curve in the road), outside 148 Pleasant Street and one in front of 51 East Main Street. The local section of King's Highway was (heading north) today's Middle Road (where markers 135 and 136 are located, the former in front of the property known as Top Knot Farm), in Cumberland, then a right onto Tuttle Road, left onto Foreside Road (where a short section of road preserves the name of the original route), then a left onto Pleasant Street, before continuing its way north to Machias.

In 1813, down at the First Falls, "the old road which clambered laboriously over the crest of the hill was replaced by a new street along the head of the wharves below the hill". This is today's Lafayette Street hill, which drops about fifty feet from its crest to its base. (It was named Lafayette Street in honor of General Lafayette, who once stayed in the three-storey building at 51 East Main Street.)

By 1847, Portland Street was in full swing, including the Elm Street offshoot that headed directly into the Upper Village. Main Street was, by now, well established.

Roswell P. Greeley established an express service between Portland and Yarmouth, employing a span of horses and large wagons. Azel H. Kingsley ran a supplemental service minus the horses. It ran two services in each direction: southbound at 7:30 and 11:30 am and northbound at 3:00 and 5:00 pm.

"Paved roads and automobiles came to Yarmouth in 1914," wrote Alan M. Hall. "The new federal highway from Portland to Bath included four miles from Pleasant Street to the Freeport line."

State Route 115, Yarmouth's Main Street, was officially designated in 1925.

U.S. Route 1 arrived in the late 1940s, at grade and also a bridge over Main Street, shortly after the conclusion of World War II.

Route 88, meanwhile, follows the course of Route 1's predecessor, the Atlantic Highway. A 1944 map shows the Atlantic Highway coming through town, aligning with what became Route 88 up to the point they meet at the end of Spring Street. Prior to the installation of U.S. Route 1, today's curve of Route 88 as it passes Cumberland Farms instead continued directly north-east towards the Cousins River. The section of Atlantic Highway that runs from Princes Point Road to the northern end of Pleasant Street was laid in the late 1920s.

In 1961, the Yarmouth section of Interstate 295 was built. It runs elevated through town (including, in controversial fashion, over the harborside at Lower Falls). It has two exits (15 and 17) in the town. Exit 15 became a four-ramp intersection in July 2013, when a northbound on-ramp was added.

=== Rail ===
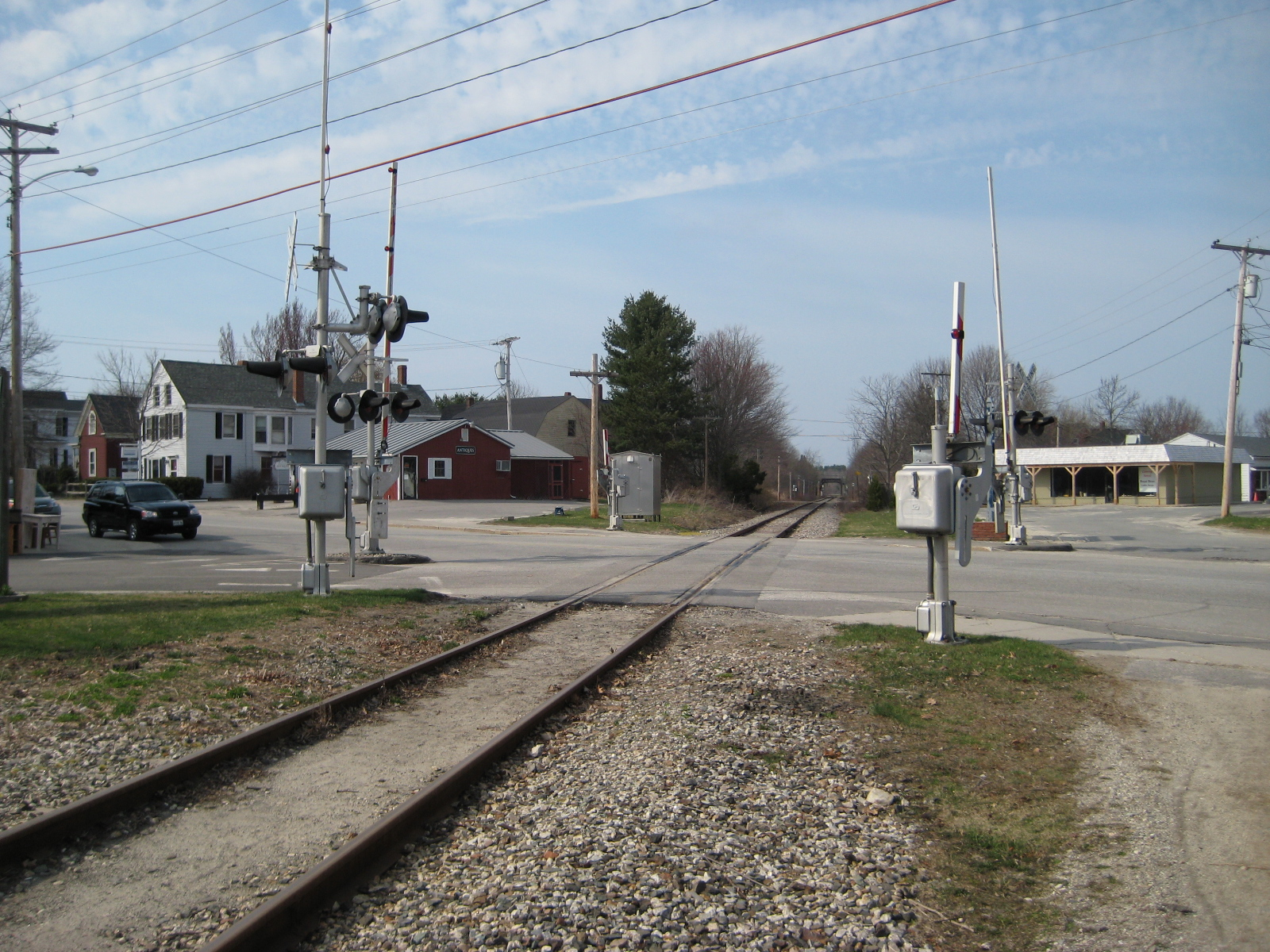
Yarmouth Crossing, where Main Street traverses the now-abandoned section of St. Lawrence and Atlantic Railroad, looking north from Railroad Square

The town has two railroad junctions: Royal Junction (midway along Greely Road) and Yarmouth Junction (to the west of East Elm Street at Depot Road; its station is now gone). The two railroads passing through the town are Guilford Rail System's Kennebec & Portland (which replaced Maine Central Railroad in 1849) and the St. Lawrence and Atlantic Railroad (SLR; replaced Grand Trunk Railway in 1848). (The section of the SLR between Portland and Auburn has been disused since 2015 and was officially abandoned a decade later.) A train wreck occurred on the morning of February 15, 1912, near Dunn's Corner (the North Road and Route 9 intersection). A westbound freight train was backing its 25 cars into a siding when a Portland-bound freight train ignored orders to slow down. The collision "drove both engines thirty feet into the air" and ignited tons of wheat and wooden boxcars. There were three fatalities and several injuries. Despite this, Yarmouth was the last stretch of the Grand Trunk to receive automatic block signals in 1924.

The Brunswick Branch of the Maine Central Railroad saw passenger service again beginning in November 2012, when a northern extension of the Downeaster line was opened, carrying passengers five times a day (four on weekends) to and from Brunswick station. (A sixth service runs on evenings of major concerts and sporting events at the TD Garden.) The trains pass under two roads and over three crossings on their way through Yarmouth. They are (from south to north) West Main Street (overpass, just after Royal Junction), Sligo Road (road crossing), East Elm Street (road crossing, just after Yarmouth Junction), North Road (road crossing) and Granite Street (overpass).

Trolley cars of the Portland and Yarmouth Electric Railway Company used to run, every fifteen minutes, from Portland, through Falmouth Foreside, up and down Pleasant Street and onto Main Street between 1898 and 1933, when the advent of the automobile made rail travel a less convenient option. In 1906, a bridge was built over the Royal River, connecting the Brunswick and Portland trolleys at the Grand Trunk depot in town. The tracks ran down what is today's walkers' path to the Rowe School. The pedestrian bridge in the Royal River Park is built on old abutments for a trolley line which ran between Yarmouth and Freeport between 1906 and 1933.

=== Bus ===
The only bus route that services the town is Greater Portland Metro's BREEZ. It runs thirteen times between Portland and Brunswick on weekdays and an abbreviated Saturday schedule. There is no service on Sundays. On weekdays, the first southbound service arrives in Yarmouth at around 6.15 AM and the last one at around 8.45 PM. The first northbound service arrives at around 6.45 AM and the last one at around 9.50 PM. On weekends, the first of five southbound services arrives at around 9.45 AM and the last one at around 7.50 PM. The first of six northbound services arrives at around 8.30 AM and the last one at around 9.00 PM.

There are three bus stop locations: the park and ride lot at the southbound exit 15 ramp of I-295, on Main Street in front of Yarmouth Town Hall, and on either side of Route 1 at Hannaford.

== Notable people ==
Settlers in Westcustogo

- John Cousins, English settler
- George Felt, English settler
- William Royall, English settler
- Joseph Weare, Indian fighter

If the subject was born before August 8, 1849, when the town was North Yarmouth (of either Massachusetts or Maine), they are included in the first section below, regardless of when they died.

While North Yarmouth

- Charles Augustus Aiken, clergyman and academic
- Rufus Anderson, minister
- Lebbeus Bailey, clockmaker
- Peter Chardon Brooks, Massachusetts state senator
- Augustus Burbank, physician
- Eleazer Burbank, physician and Maine state senator
- Augustus W. Corliss, writer and historian
- Levi Cutter, fourth Mayor of Portland
- Revd. Ammi Ruhamah Cutter, minister
- Samuel Drinkwater, American sea captain
- Tristram Gilman, minister
- Elijah Dix Green, merchant
- George W. Hammond, businessman
- Nicholas Loring, minister
- Levi Marston, sea captain
- Elizabeth Oakes Smith, writer
- James Parker, innkeeper
- Cushing Prince, politician
- Cushing Prince Jr., sea captain
- Harlan Prince, sea captain
- Edward Russell, Maine secretary of state, brigadier general
- Joseph A. Seabury, shipwright
- Lorenzo L. Shaw, businessman
- Ephraim Sturdivant, ship captain
- William Todd, businessman
- Elkanah Walker, pioneer

While Yarmouth, Maine

- F. Lee Bailey, lawyer in the O.J. Simpson murder trial
- Susannah Beck, distance runner
- Arthur L. Bell, politician
- Frank W. Bucknam, pharmacist
- Gordon B. Cross, former president of Nichols College
- Grace DeGennaro, artist
- Hanley Denning, founder of Safe Passage
- Horatio Dresser, religious leader
- Mark Filley, Major League Baseball pitcher
- Leon Gorman, former president of L.L.Bean
- Joseph York Hodsdon, Maine state senator
- Charles Drummond Lawrence, United States federal judge
- James B. Longley, Jr., US congressman
- Carl McKinley, composer
- Reuben Merrill, sea captain
- Samuel B. Newton, American football player
- Frank L. Oakes, sea captain
- William Hutchinson Rowe, historian and author
- Alfred T. Small, sea captain
- Oliver Wahlstrom, NHL player for the New York Islanders system
- Eric Weinrich, former NHL defenseman

== See also ==
- Yarmouth (CDP), Maine
