= Grace DeGennaro =

American artist

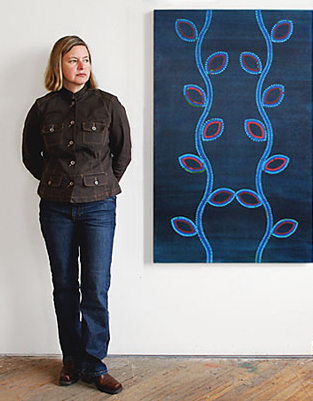
- Grace DeGennaro in her studio, 2008
- Born: 1956 (age 69–70); Rockville Center, New York
- Known for: Painting
- Website: gracedegennaro.com

Grace DeGennaro (born 1956) is an American artist. She is best known for watercolors and paintings that explore “ritual, geometry, and growth through repeated forms, serial patterns, and iconic forms like circles and diamonds.”

== Biography ==
DeGennaro was born in Rockville Centre, New York in 1956. She received a BS in Fine Arts from Skidmore College in 1978 and an MFA from Columbia University in 1986. She lives and works in Yarmouth, Maine.

== Work ==
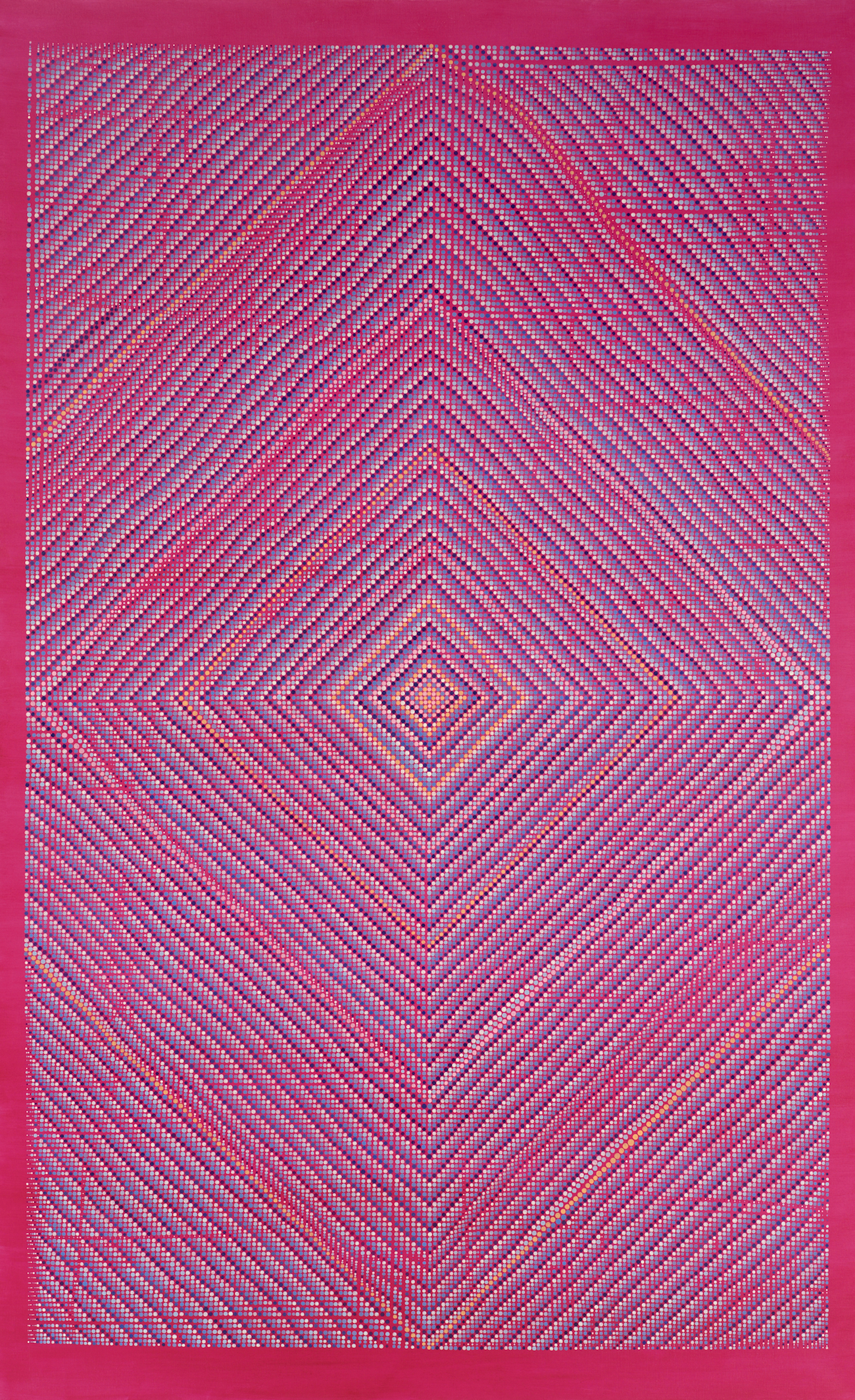
Duration (Magenta), 2018, oil on linen, 78" x 48"

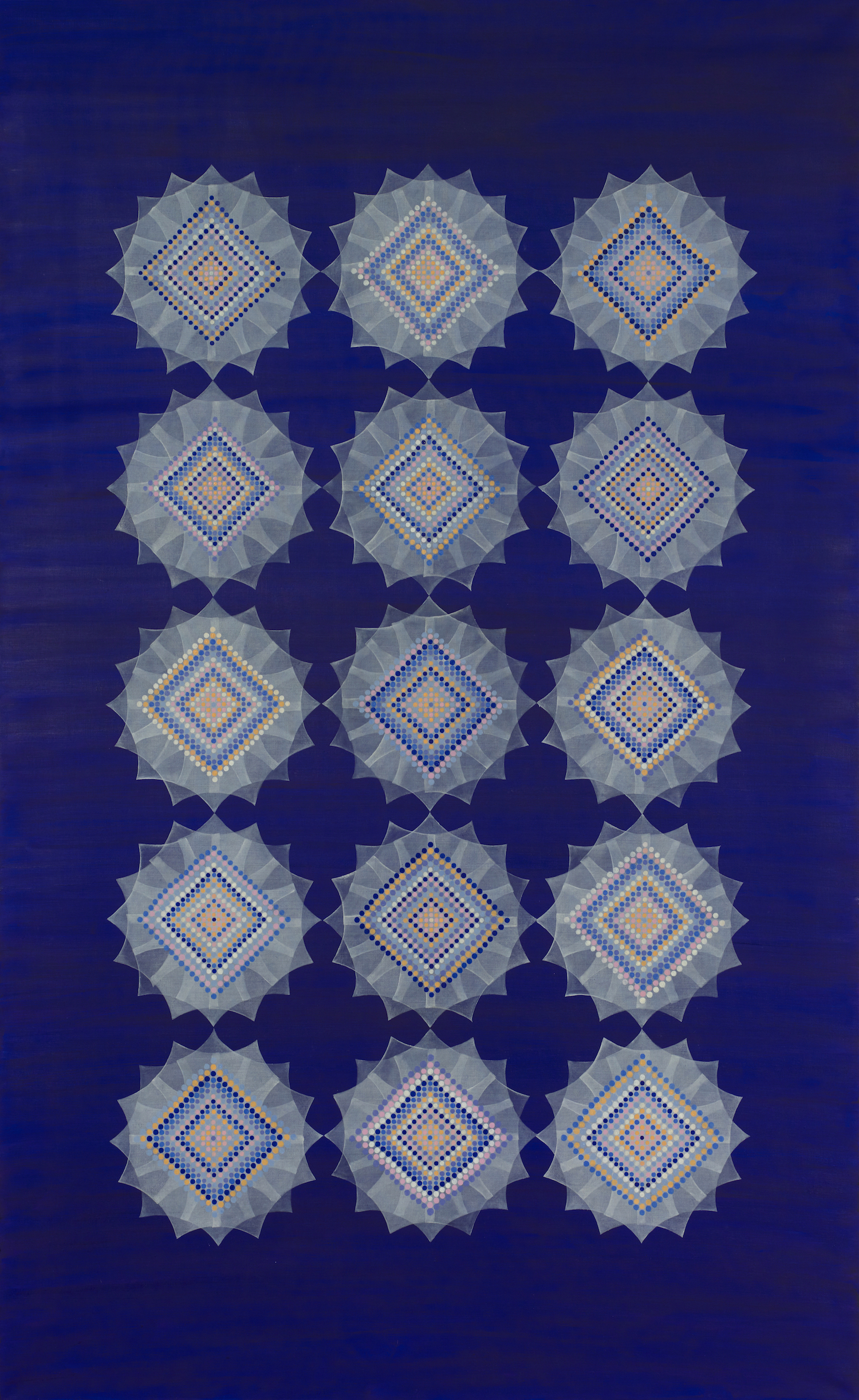
Sunwheels, 2017, oil on linen, 78" x 48"

DeGennaro’s artistic practice has been described as nature and mathematics converging where “subtle washes of watercolor yield symmetrical compositions of circles and triangles, which are then heightened with small beads of colored pigment. These patterns accumulate according to the Fibonacci sequence or the principle of gnomonic growth to create a visible record of time.”

Among her early influences was the 1984 exhibition at the Museum of Modern Art, Primitivism in 20th Century Art, which focused on the impact of ritual and religion in non-Western art.

Along with art from non-Western cultures the artist’s life-long study of symbols and her own dreams have been a source of inspiration. DeGennaro has recorded dreams in a journal for 37 years.

DeGennaro has been the recipient of a grant from the Ballinglen Arts Foundation in 2012.

== Selected exhibitions ==
DeGennaro’s work has been included in Sixfold Symmetry: Pattern in Art and Science at The Frances Young Tang Teaching Museum and Art Gallery in Saratoga Springs, Patterns: Selections from the Kentler Flatfiles at Kentler International Drawing Space in Brooklyn, NY, and To Infinity and Beyond: Mathematics in Contemporary Art at the Heckscher Museum of Art in Huntington, NY. Her work has also been exhibited in the American Embassies in Tanzania and Qatar.

- 2026 Eternal Forms, Cove Street Arts, Portland, ME
- 2026 The Forms of Things Unknown, The France Young Tang Teaching Museum, Saratoga Springs, NY
- 2026 Vernal, Friday Arts, New York, NY
- 2025 The Geometry of Time, Friday Arts, online
- 2025 Platonic Solids, Friday Arts, online
- 2025-24 Lacuna, Ballinglen Museum of Art, Ballycastle, County Mayo, Ireland, curated by Nuala Clarke
- 2018 Heaven and Earth, Drive-By Projects, Watertown, MA
- 2018 New Geometry II, Fred Giampietro Gallery, New Haven, CT
- 2016 Continuum, Schema Projects, Brooklyn, NY
- 2017 Patterns: Selections from the Kentler Flatfiles, Kentler International Drawing Space, Brooklyn, NY; curated by Samantha Friedman
- 2017 Sixfold Symmetry: Pattern in Art and Science, The Frances Young Tang Teaching Museum and Art Gallery, Saratoga Springs, NY; curated by Rachel Seligman And Rachel Roe Dale
- 2015 Stack/File: Selections from the Kentler Flatfiles, Kentler International Drawing Space, Brooklyn, NY; curated by Ana Torok
- 2012 Textility
- 2012 Biennial, Center for Maine Contemporary Art, Rockland, ME
- 2010 Indigo, Aucocisco Gallery, Portland, ME
- 2008 To Infinity and Beyond: Mathematics in Contemporary Art, Heckscher Museum, Huntington, NY Curated by Lynn Gamwell and Elizabeth Merryman

== Public collections ==
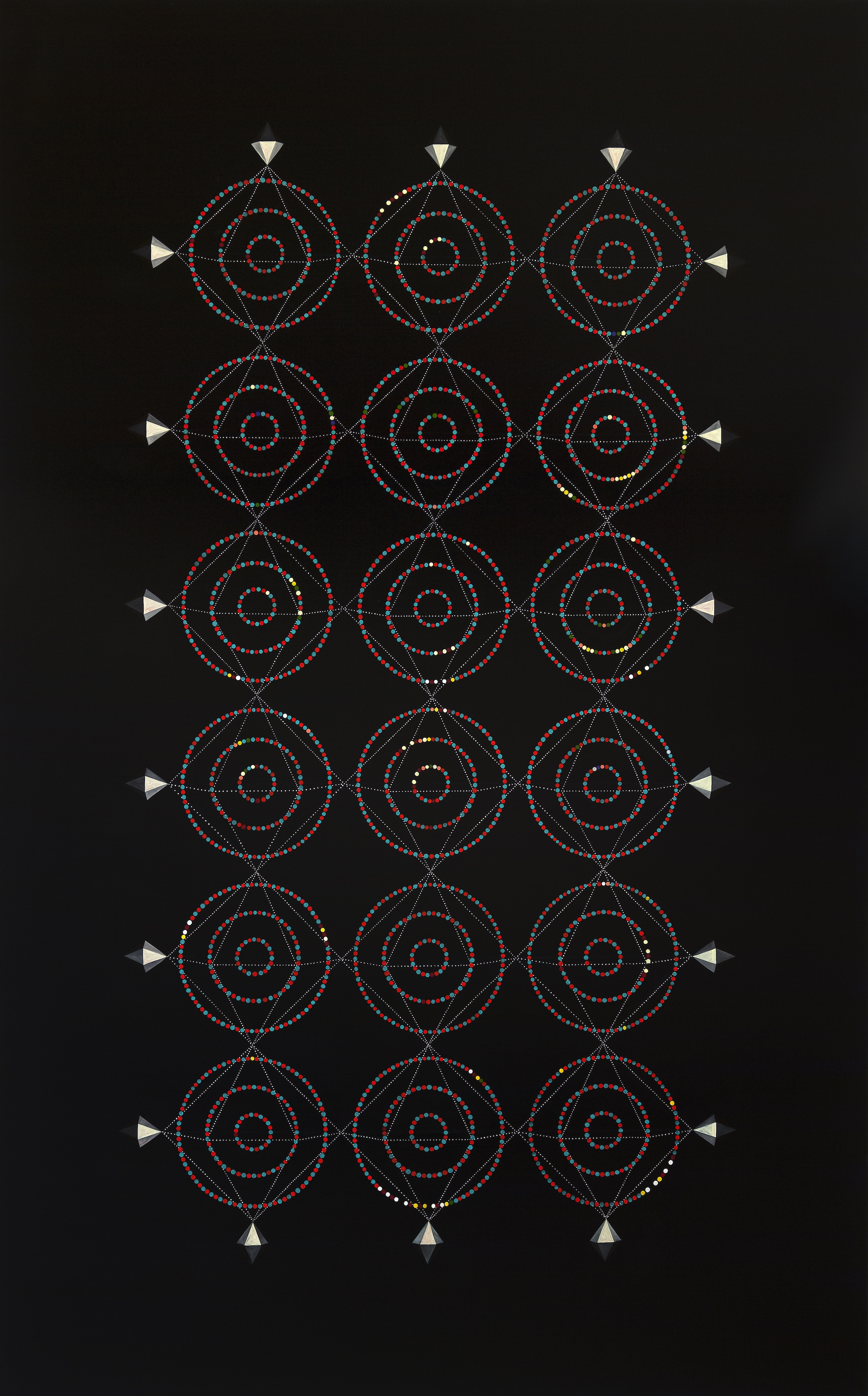
Serape, 2010, oil on linen, 96" x 60"

- Tang Teaching Museum, Saratoga Springs, NY
- Heckscher Museum, Huntington, NY
- Gund Collection, Boston, MA
- Smithsonian American Art Museum, Washington DC
- University of New England, Portland, ME
- Ballinglen Arts Foundation Archive, County Mayo, Ireland
- Wellington Management, Boston, MA
- Fidelity Investments, Boston, MA
- AstraZeneca, Boston, MA
- Bell Atlantic, New York, NY
- Capital Group, Los Angeles, CA
- Goldman Sachs, New York, NY
- Mintz, Levin Associates, New York, NY
