= Joseph A. Seabury =

American sea captain and shipwright

Joseph Albert Seabury
- Resting place: Riverside Cemetery, Yarmouth, Maine, U.S.
- Occupation: Shipwright
- Known for: Shipbuilding

Joseph Albert Seabury was an American sea captain and shipwright known for a high volume of vessels produced in the mid-to-late 19th century during the peak years of shipbuilding in North Yarmouth, Maine (today's Yarmouth).

== Career ==
In the 1840s, Seabury was a sea captain. In 1843, he was in charge of the brig Zoroaster, which was built in Thomaston, Maine, with fellow Mainers Nathaniel Robbins, of Fairfield, and Moses Tolman, of Industry.

Seabury worked with his father, Joseph Sr., at the J. & A. Seabury yards on the eastern side of the Royal River at Yarmouth's harbor.

Seabury Jr. also worked at Blanchard Brothers shipyard, which was established in 1857 by former sea captain Sylvanus Blanchard and three of his sons, Paul, Sylvanus Cushing and Perez.

== Selected vessels ==
Seabury was responsible for the following selected ships:

- Detroit (1855)
- Abbie C. Titcomb (1863)
- Admiral
- S. C. Blanchard
- Pacific
- Star
- Casco Lodge (1867)
- Commodore (1879)
