= Captain S. C. Blanchard House =

Historic house in Maine, United States

- Capt. S. C. Blanchard House
- U.S. National Register of Historic Places
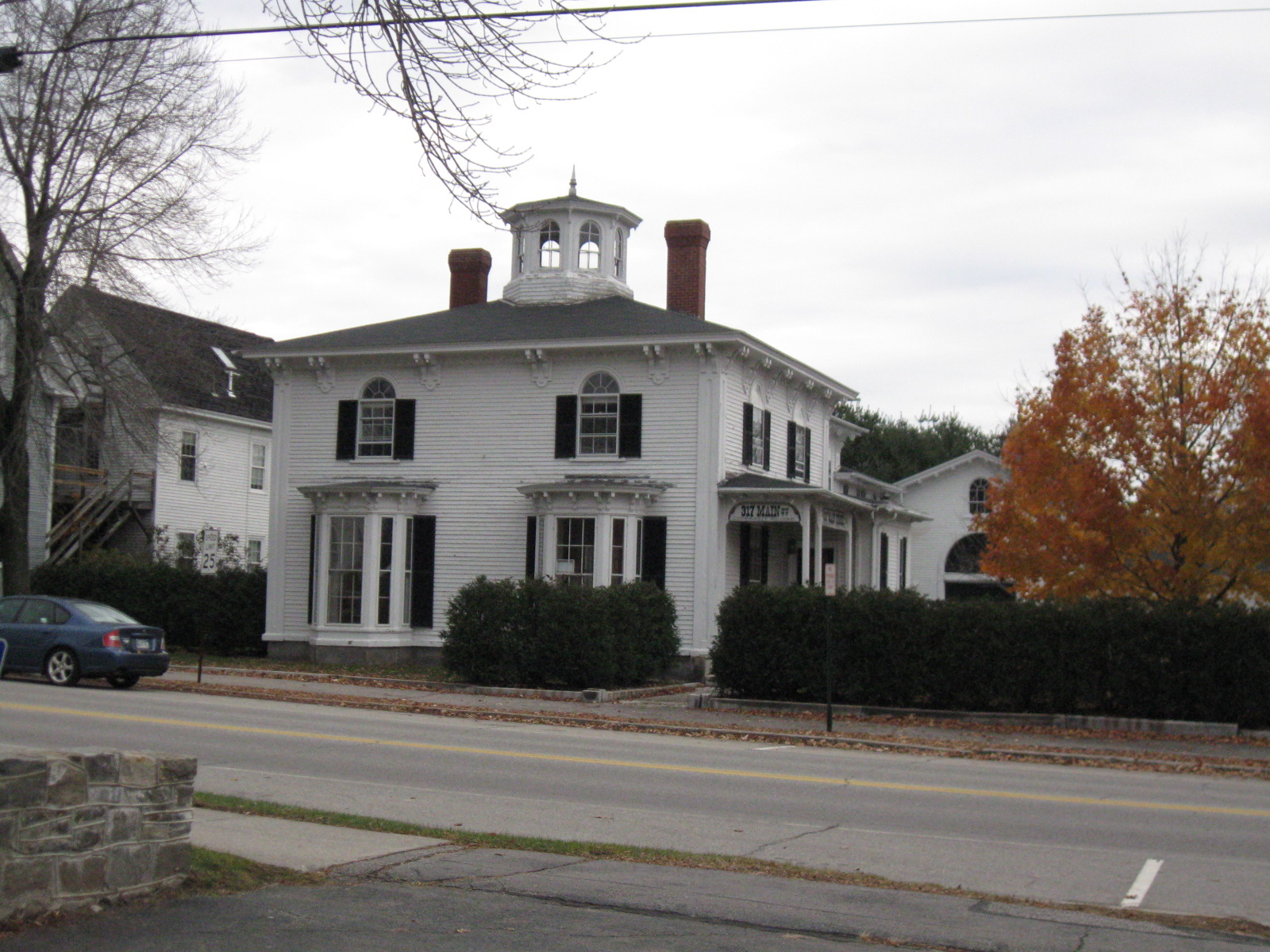

- Location within Maine Location within the United States
- Location: 317 Main Street, Yarmouth, Maine
- Coordinates: 43°48′9″N 70°11′29″W
- Area: 0.5 acres (0.20 ha)
- Built: 1855
- Architect: Charles A. Alexander
- Architectural style: Italianate
- NRHP reference No.: 79000136
- Added to NRHP: May 7, 1979

The Captain S. C. Blanchard House is an historic house at 317 Main Street in Yarmouth, Maine. Built in 1855, it is one of Yarmouth's finest examples of Italianate architecture. It was built for Sylvanus Blanchard, a ship's captain and shipyard owner. The house was listed on the National Register of Historic Places in 1979. The building is now home to the 317 Main Community Music Center.

== Description and history ==
The Blanchard House is located on the north side of Main Street (Maine State Route 115), at its northwest corner with Mill Street. It is a two-story wood-frame structure, its main block capped by a hip roof with cupola, and a series of ells that extended to a carriage house at the rear of the property, which was torn down around 2018. The roof has deep eaves studded with pairs of ornately carved brackets, and the eight-sided cupola has round-arch windows, and single brackets under its eight-sided roof. The main facade faces east, with an ornately decorated single-story hip-roofed porch across its width. The street-facing southern facade is two bays wide, with projecting bay windows on the first floor, topped by bracketed cornices. The second-floor sash windows are topped by half-round transom windows.

The house was designed by Portland architect Charles A. Alexander, and was built in 1855 for Captain Sylvanus Blanchard (1778–1858), a ship's captain and boatbuilder who was one of Yarmouth's leading citizens of the day. Blanchard lived in the house just three years, dying in 1858, and the house passed to his son, Sylvanus Cushing Blanchard (1811–1888). Since 2004 it has housed the community music education facility known as 317 Main.

== See also ==
- National Register of Historic Places listings in Cumberland County, Maine
- Historical buildings and structures of Yarmouth, Maine
