= Hill Cemetery (Yarmouth, Maine) =

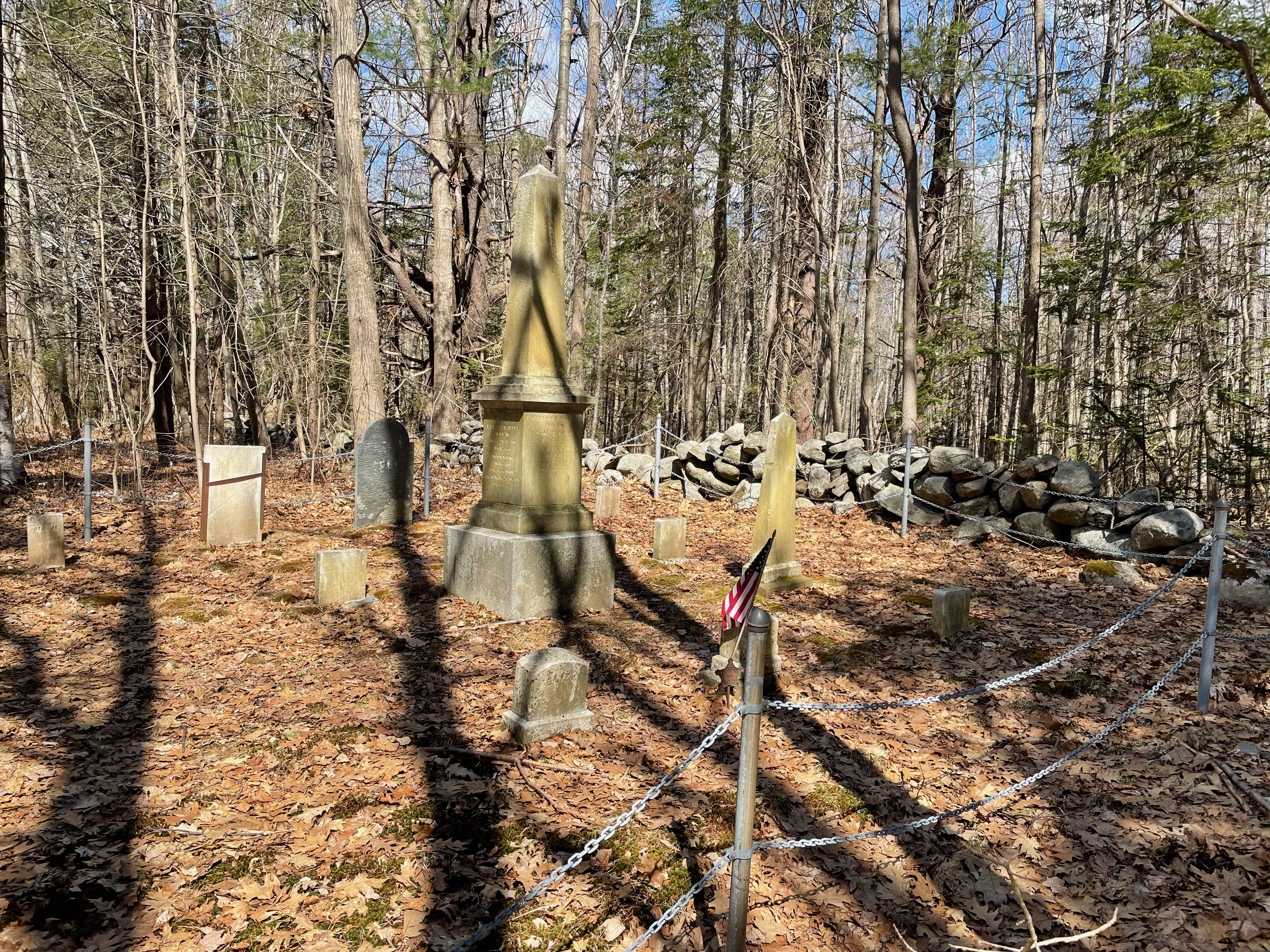
- Pictured in 2021
- Interactive map of Hill Cemetery

Details
- Established: 1831 (195 years ago)
- Location: Seal Lane, Cousins Island, Yarmouth, Maine,
- Country: United States
- Coordinates: 43.7649°N 70.1416°W
- Type: Private
- Find a Grave: Hill Cemetery

Hill Cemetery is a historic cemetery on Cousins Island in Yarmouth, Maine. Located in today's Katherine Tinker Preserve, it is now closed to burials.

The cemetery is so named because it contains only members of the Hill family, with dates of death ranging from 1831 to 1899. It includes burials of Revolutionary War veterans.
