= Cousins Island Chapel =

- U.S. National Register of Historic Places
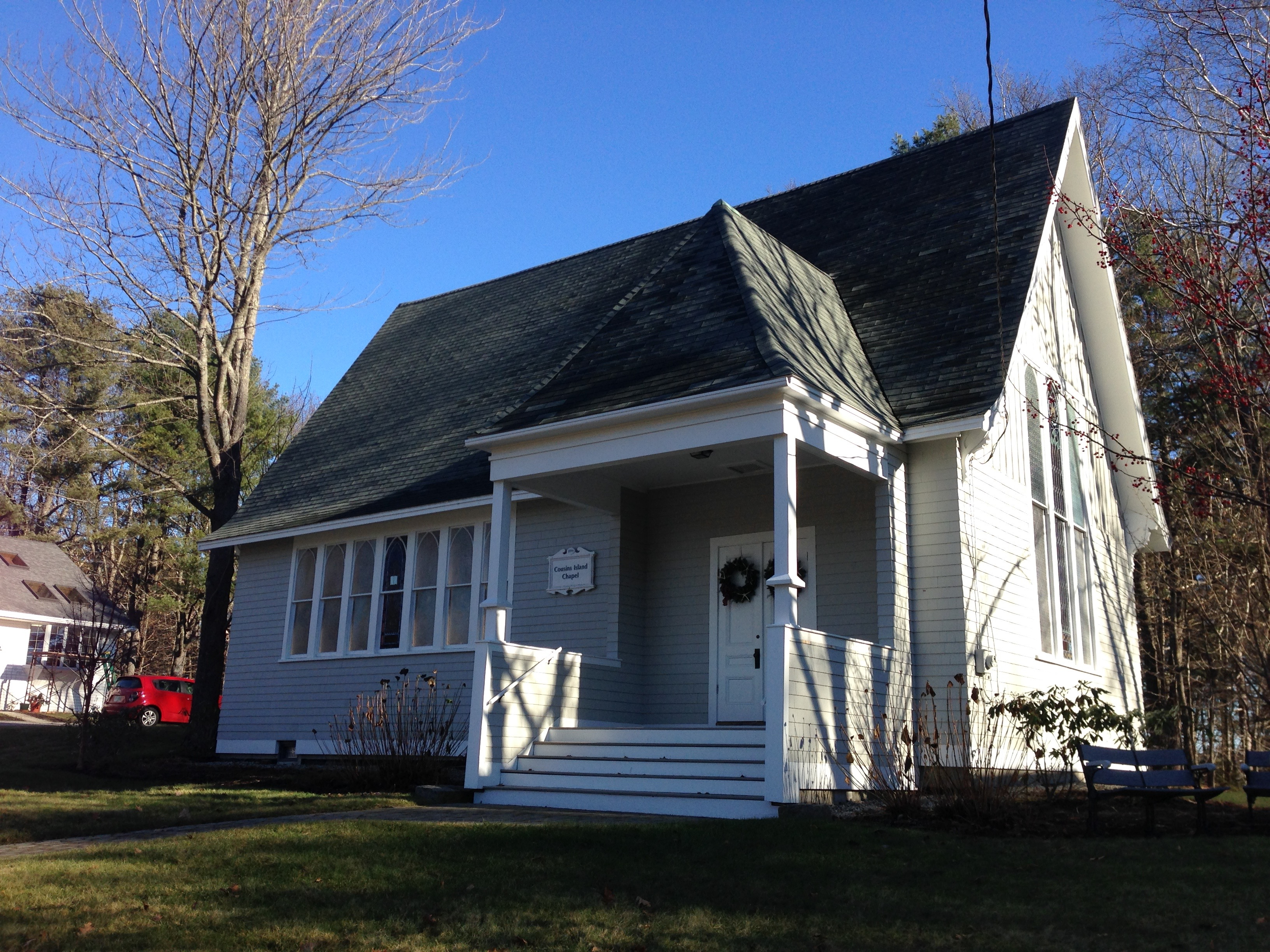
- The chapel in December 2015

- Location within Maine Location within the United States
- Location: 414 Cousins Street, Cousins Island, Maine
- Coordinates: 43°45′39″N 70°8′30″W
- Area: less than one acre
- Built: 1894
- Architectural style: Gothic, Shingle Style
- NRHP reference No.: 97000605
- Added to NRHP: June 20, 1997

Cousins Island Chapel is an historic non-denominational chapel at 414 Cousins Street on Cousins Island, an island in Casco Bay off the coast of Yarmouth, Maine. Built in 1894 by local year-round residents, it is the most architecturally notable building on the island, and is representative of a late 19th-century trend of building summer chapels in coastal Maine. It was listed on the National Register of Historic Places in 1997.

== Description and history ==
Cousins Island Chapel is located near the center of Cousins Island, on the east side of the main road (Cousins Street) at its junction with Talbot Road (which is the sole outlet to Littlejohn Island). The chapel is a modest single-story wood-frame structure, with a steeply pitched gable roof, and an exterior finished in a combination of wooden shingles and board-and-batten siding. It is oriented with its long axis parallel to the road, with a band of sash windows offset to the left of center on the street-facing facade, and a hip-roofed entrance porch to the right. The gable ends have lancet-arched windows, some with stained glass, with board-and-batten siding in the gables. There are decorative sawn brackets at the lower edge of the roof where it flare out slightly.

The chapel was built in 1894–95 by volunteer labor organized by the Yarmouth First Baptist Church, to provide a place of worship for the residents of Cousins and Littlejohn Islands. Although most of the services held there were Baptist, the building was open to all denominations. It was used regularly for services until World War II, and is now maintained by a local nonprofit group and is open for services at 10:15 am in July and August. The chapel is one of a series of architecturally distinctive coastal chapels built in Maine during the late 19th century, although it is distinguished from the others in that it was built for year-round residents, rather than for summer visitors.

== See also ==
- National Register of Historic Places listings in Cumberland County, Maine
