= Sacred Heart Catholic Church (Yarmouth, Maine) =

Historic church in Maine, United States

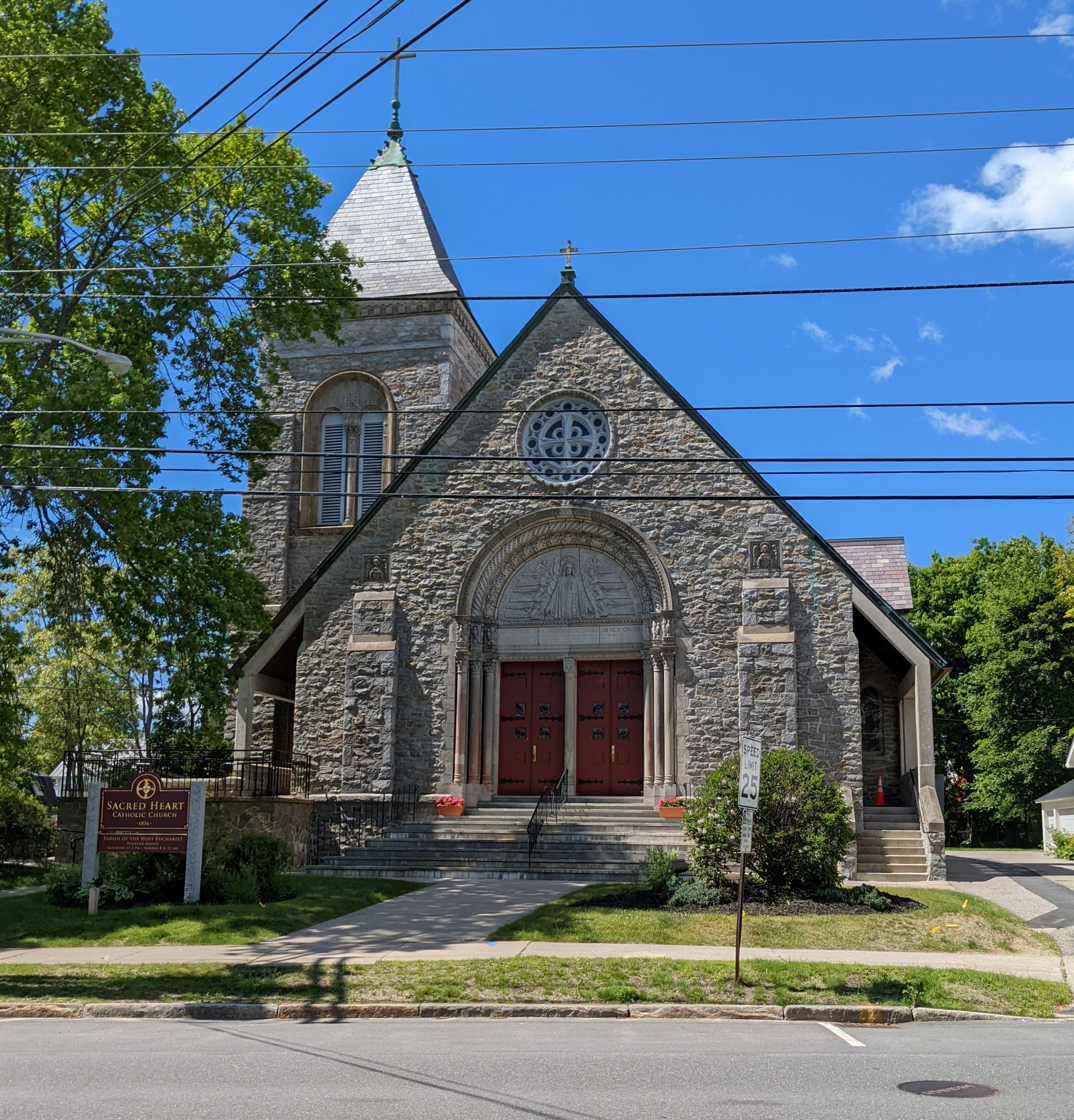
- The church in 2022
- Sacred Heart Catholic Church
- 43.80242126°N 70.1919558°W
- Location: 326 Main Street, Yarmouth, Maine
- Country: United States
- Denomination: Catholic

Architecture
- Completed: 1929 (97 years ago)

Sacred Heart Catholic Church is a church at 326 Main Street in Yarmouth, Maine, United States. It was built, in 1929, from stone quarried from North Yarmouth.

Mass was first said in Yarmouth on November 12, 1856, in the home of Patrick Doran. After that, services were rotated amongst families willing to host. Mass was initially celebrated once every couple of months and always on a weekday. If people wanted to worship in a church on Sunday, they had to travel (often by foot) to Portland, twelve miles to the south.

The cornerstone of the church was laid in 1921, and construction took eight years. When the church was dedicated, in 1929, its interior was still unfinished.

The church was restored in 1973 to reflect the original plans of its first pastor, Father Joseph Quinn. This included revealing its wooden beams in the vaulted ceiling and uncovering its rose window.

It underwent another major renovation in 1992, when its basement was converted into a meeting space.

In 2011, Sacred Heart joined the Parish of the Holy Eucharist on Foreside Road in Falmouth.

== Pastors ==
The church has had fifteen pastors in its history. Father Joseph Quinn was the longest-serving (27 years).

- Father Joseph Quinn (1910–1937)
- Father Edward Walsch (1937–1954)
- Father James Daly (1954–1967)
- Father Henry Pender (1967–1968)
- Father Francis LeTourneau (1968–1973)
- Father Charles M. Murphy (1973–1978)
- Father Conrad L'Heureux (1978–1984)
- Father Roger Chabot (1984–1992)
- Father Richard O'Donnell (1992–2000)
- Msg. Paul Stefanko (2000–2005)
- Father Ray Picard (2005–2010)
- Father Joseph Ford (2010–2012)
- Father Daniel Greenleaf (2012–2019)
- Father Philip A. Tracy (2019–2022)
- Father Steven Cartwright (2022–present)
