= Charles Augustus Aiken =

American clergyman and educator

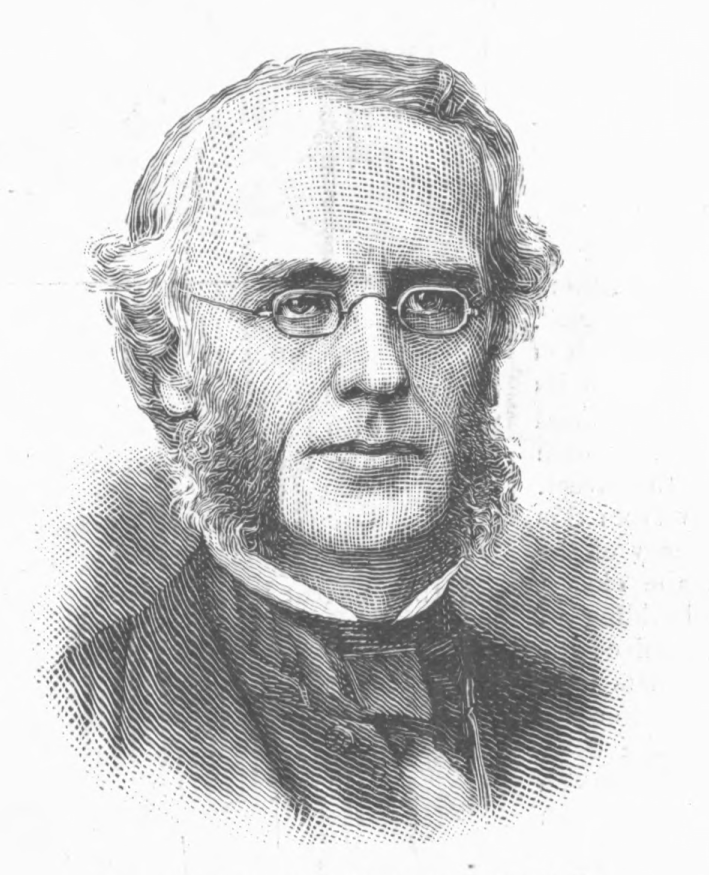
- Born: October 30, 1827; Manchester, Vermont, US
- Died: January 14, 1892 (aged 64); Princeton, New Jersey, US
- Alma mater: Dartmouth College; Andover Theological Seminary
- Occupation: Educator
- Employer: Dartmouth College (1859–1866); Princeton Theological Seminary (1871–1892); Princeton University (1866–1869); Union College (1869–1871)
- Spouse(s): Sarah Noyes (m. 1854)
- Awards: honorary doctorate from Princeton University (1866); Doctor of Divinity (1869, Princeton University)

Charles Augustus Aiken (October 30, 1827 – January 14, 1892) was an American clergyman and academic.

He was born in Manchester, Vermont, on October 30, 1827, to John Aiken and Harriet Adams Aiken. He graduated from Dartmouth College in 1846, at the age of nineteen, and went on to Andover Theological Seminary, where he graduated in 1853. He married Sarah Noyes on October 17, 1854, and was ordained a pastor of the Congregational church in Yarmouth, Maine, that same year.

In 1859, he took the position of professor of Latin languages and literature at Dartmouth College, remaining in that position through 1866. He left there to teach at the Princeton University then, and continued there through 1869.

He became president of Union College June 28, 1870, having discharged the duties of the office during the preceding year. He left that position in 1871, to become the first Archibald Alexander professor of Christian ethics and apologetics at Princeton Theological Seminary, which he remained in that position until his death.

In 1870, he translated and edited The Proverbs of Solomon Theologically and Homiletically Expounded he was also an editor of the Princeton Review, and a contributor to other periodicals. He died at Princeton, New Jersey, on January 14, 1892.

== Sources ==
- Who Was Who in America: Historical Volume, 1607-1892. Chicago: Marquis Who's Who, 1963.

Attribution

Preceded by Laurens Perseus Hickok	Union College presidents 1869 – 1871	Succeeded by Eliphalet Nott Potter
