= Sylvanus Blanchard =

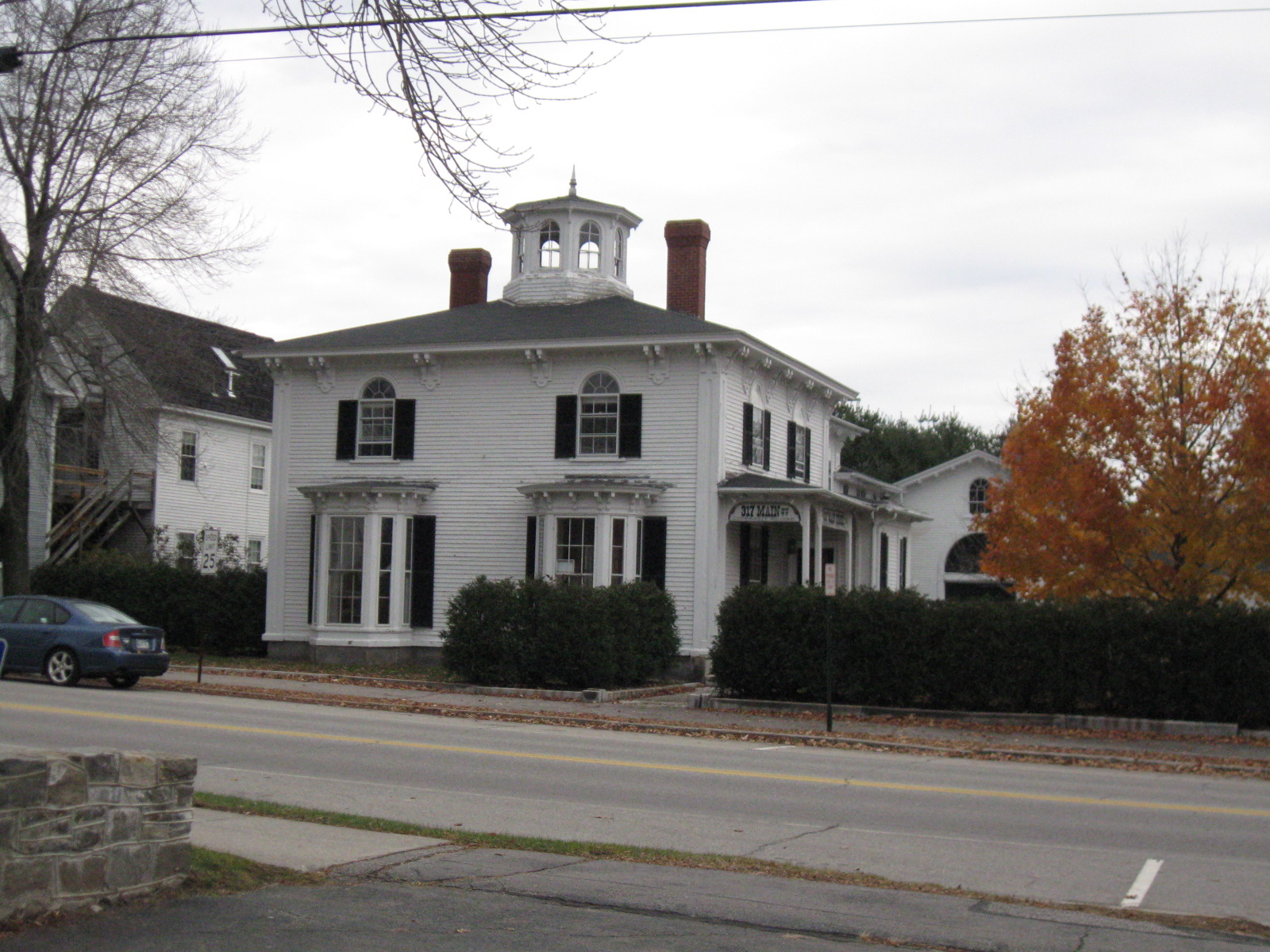
- Today's 317 Main Street in Yarmouth, built by Blanchard in 1855
- Born: April 9, 1778; North Yarmouth, Province of Massachusetts Bay, U.S.
- Died: January 6, 1858 (aged 79)
- Occupations: Sea captain Ship builder
- Spouse: Dorcas Prince Blanchard (1804–1858; his death)

Captain Sylvanus Blanchard (April 9, 1778 – January 6, 1858) was an American merchant sea captain. A native of North Yarmouth, Maine, after retiring from the seas he became a noted shipwright, owner of one of the four main shipyards of Yarmouth harbor during the town's peak shipbuilding years of 1850–1875.

== Early life ==
Blanchard was born in North Yarmouth, Province of Massachusetts Bay, in 1778, to Joshua Blanchard (1748–1835) and Jane Prince (1750–1850). He was one of eleven children, the others being William (born 1772), Elizabeth (Betsey) (born 1773), Hannah (born 1775), Saba (born 1780), Nathaniel (born 1783), Perez (born 1785), Reuben (born 1787), Huldah (born 1789), Theodotia (born 1792) and Levi (born 1794).

== Career ==
After a successful career as a sea captain, he became a shipwright after returning to shore full-time. He formed the shipbuilding company Blanchard Brothers, with his sons Paul, Sylvanus Cushing and Perez, which was in operation between 1857 and 1893. Under master builder Joseph A. Seabury, among the ships his company built was Admiral, Commodore, S. C. Blanchard (captained by Frank L. Oakes, husband of his granddaughter Frances), Pacific, Star and Detroit. The sons continued the business after their father's death.

== Personal life ==
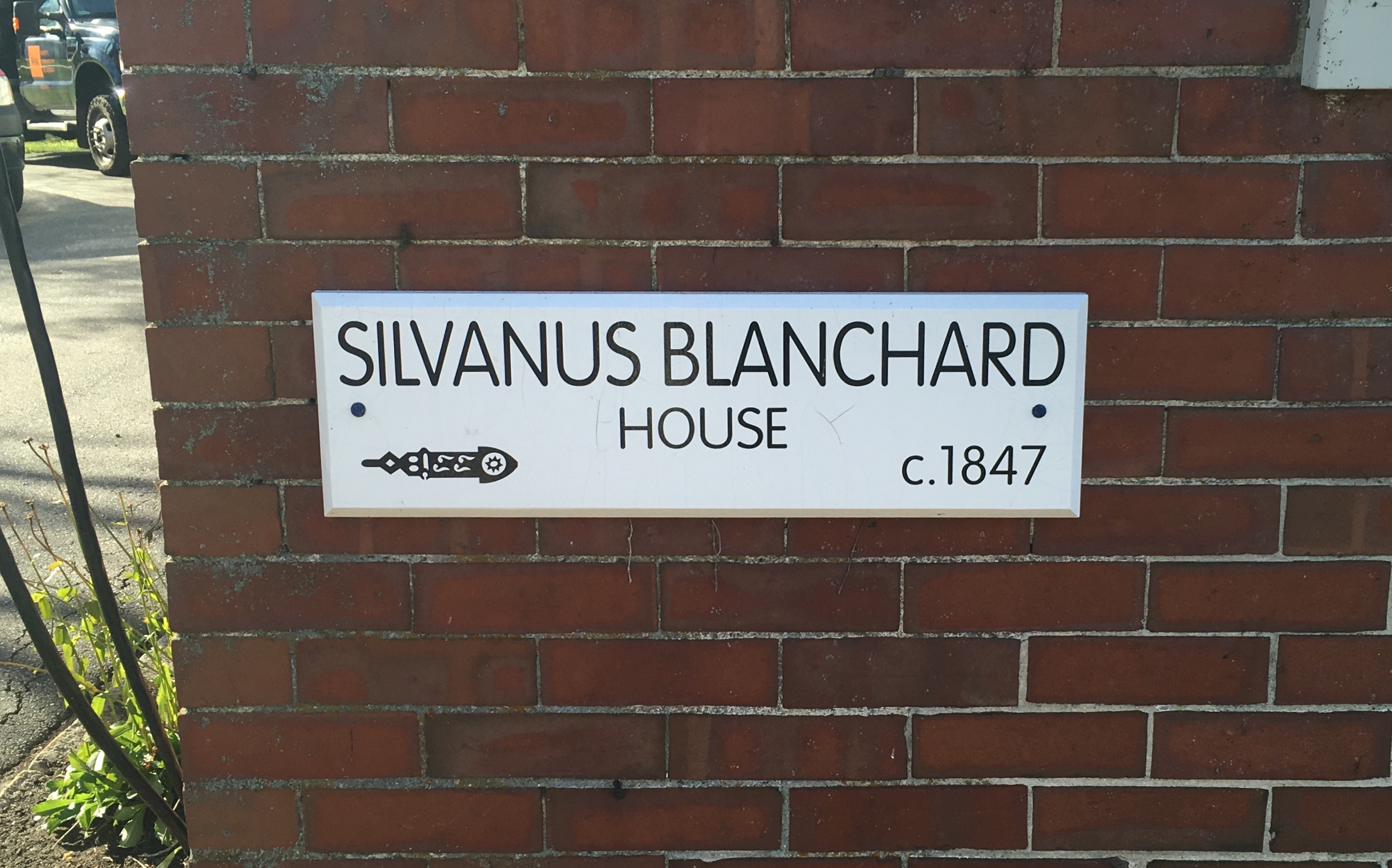
Wooden plaques provided by the Yarmouth Village Improvement Society adorn more than 100 notable buildings in the town. Blanchard moved from this residence, at 158 Main Street, to 317 Main Street in 1855

Blanchard married Dorcas Prince Blanchard (1781–1863), daughter of Cushing Prince and Hannah Blanchard, on October 25, 1804. They had eight children: David Prince Blanchard (1806–1828), Paul Greely Blanchard (born 1808), Sylvanus Cushing Blanchard (born 1811), Perez Nathaniel Blanchard (born 1815), Samuel Woodbury Blanchard (1818–1857), Dorcas Jane Blanchard (1822–1862), Ammi Mitchell Blanchard (born 1825) and Olive Elizabeth Blanchard (1826–1861). Paul, Sylvanus Cushing and Perez became sea captains.

Having lived for a period at today's 158 Main Street in Yarmouth, in 1855 Blanchard had built the home at today's number 317. He lived to enjoy it for only three years, however, before his death. The home passed to one of his sons, and is today known as the Captain Sylvanus Cushing House. It is listed on the National Register of Historic Places.

== Death ==
Blanchard died in 1858, aged 79. He is buried in Yarmouth's Old Baptist Cemetery.
