= Frank W. Bucknam =

American pharmacist (1869–1942)

Frank William Bucknam
- Bucknam around 1900
- Born: December 7, 1869; Yarmouth, Maine, U.S.
- Died: April 30, 1942 (aged 72); Skowhegan, Maine, U.S.
- Resting place: Southside Cemetery, Skowhegan, Maine, U.S.
- Occupation: Pharmacist
- Years active: 1890–1942
- Known for: Maine's Commissioner of Pharmacy
- Spouse(s): Gertrude F. Whitcomb (1896–1925; her death); Eva Lillian Knowlton (1926–1942; his death)

Frank William Bucknam (December 7, 1869 – April 30, 1942) was an American pharmacist from Yarmouth, Maine. He was appointed Maine's Commissioner of Pharmacy in 1906, and was a delegate to the United States Pharmacopeial Convention in Washington, D.C., on several occasions.

== Early life ==
Bucknam was born on December 7, 1869, in Yarmouth, Maine, to William and Katie. He was educated in the public schools. After graduating high school, he attended business college in Portland, Maine, graduating around the time of his 21st birthday in 1890.

== Career ==
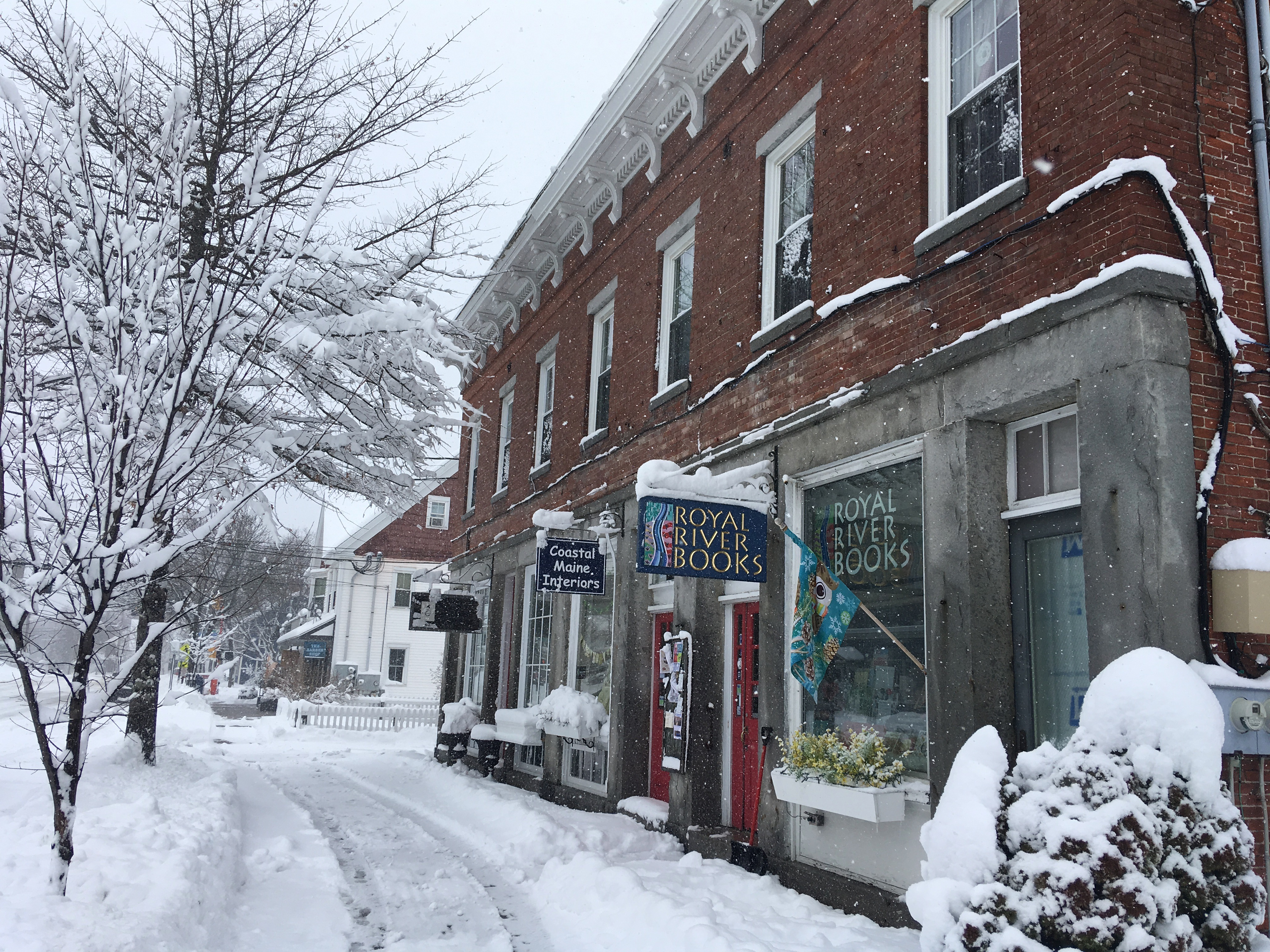
Leone R. Cook's apothecary was in the unit now occupied by Royal River Books

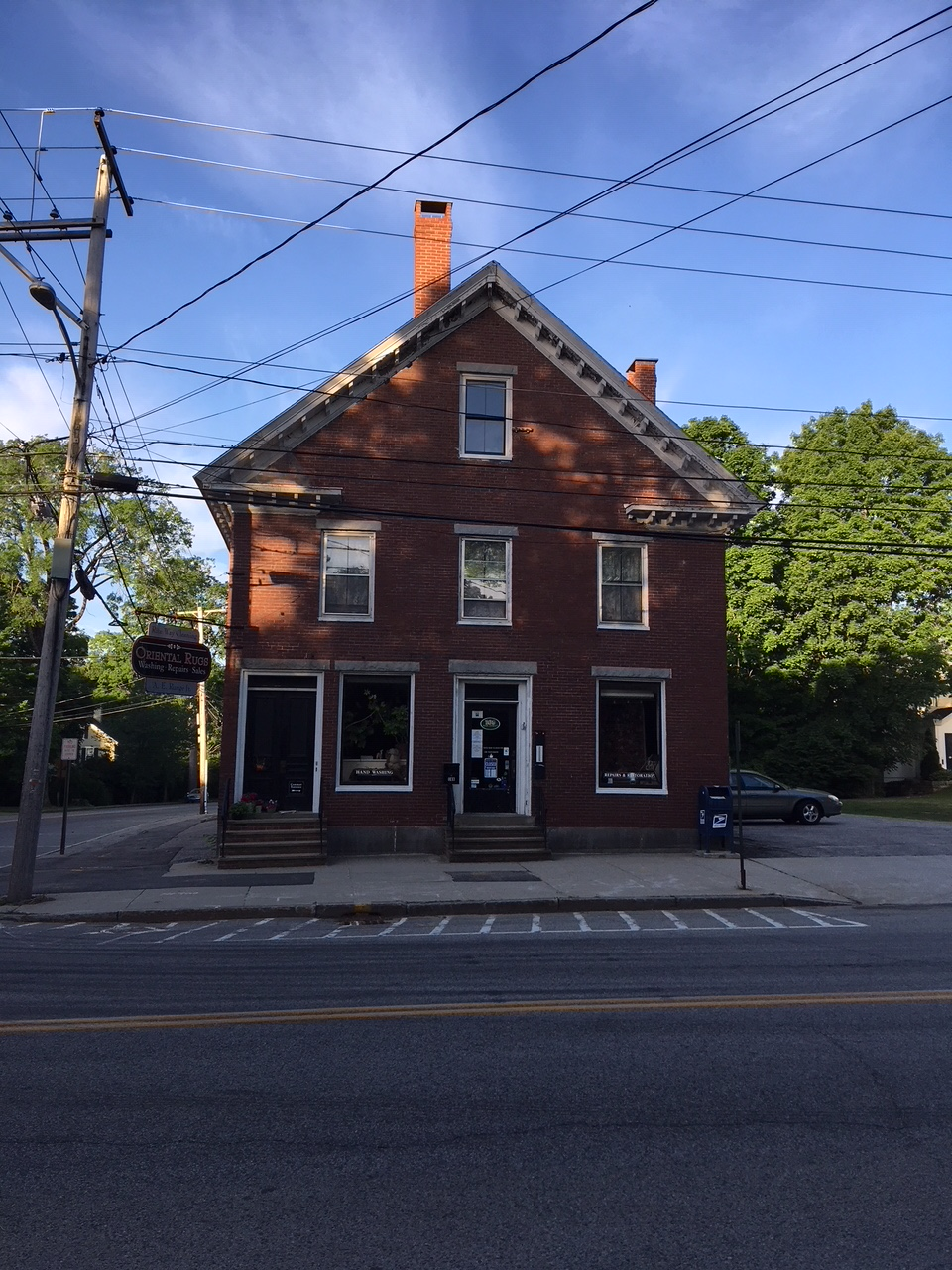
108 Main Street, Yarmouth, in which Bucknam operated a pharmacy between 1894 and 1900

Bucknam entered the drug business as an apprentice with Leone R. Cook in Yarmouth's Upper Village. While there, in 1894 he received a certificate as a registered pharmacist.

In March 1894, he began running his own store at today's 108 Main Street in Yarmouth's Lower Falls. His stock included toilet articles, patent medicines, paints, oils, wallpaper, leading brands of cigars and confectionary. After six years in business, and while also balancing a role as a Yarmouth town clerk, in 1900 he purchased a store in Skowhegan, living with his wife, Gertrude, on Madison Avenue. His new business was destroyed by fire in December 1904, but he was back in business in a temporary store within 36 hours. He eventually found a new home beneath the Oxford Hotel at 78 Water Street. This building too burned down, in 1908.

In 1906, Bucknam was appointed Maine's Commissioner of Pharmacy by Governor of Maine William T. Cobb, beating five other candidates. He had received written recommendations from three-quarters of the druggists in the state.

Bucknam was a delegate to the United States Pharmacopeial Convention in Washington, D.C., on multiple occasions, including in May 1920.

== Personal life ==
Bucknam was married twice: firstly to Gertrude F. Whitcomb, a native of Laurel, Indiana, from September 2, 1896, until her death on March 11, 1925, then Eva Lillian Knowlton from April 6, 1926, until his own death. He had one known child, Alvan William, with Gertrude. Alvan died in the Battle of Chateau-Thierry, France, during the latter stages of the World War I.

== Death ==
Bucknam died on April 30, 1942, aged 72, in Skowhegan.
