= Edward Russell (Maine politician) =

American politician

Edward Russell (August 31, 1782 – November 29, 1835) served as the Maine Secretary of State and was a brigadier general.

== Life and career ==
Russell was born on August 31, 1782, in Portland, Maine, to Dr. Edward Russell and Hannah Clark Russell. He served as a justice of the peace and quorum, represented the town of North Yarmouth, Maine, in the general court and was elected as an overseer of Bowdoin College. Starting in 1815 Russell was commissioned a brigadier general in the militia. He served as director of the U.S. Branch Bank in 1829 and became secretary of state of Maine in 1830 and 1831. Russell also served as corresponding secretary of the Maine Historical Society and in 1833 delivered the centennial address of the settlement of North Yarmouth.

== Death ==
Russell died in North Yarmouth on November 29, 1835.

Political offices
Preceded by Amos Nichols	Secretary of State of Maine; 1830–1831	Succeeded by Roscoe Greene
