= James Lane (settler) =

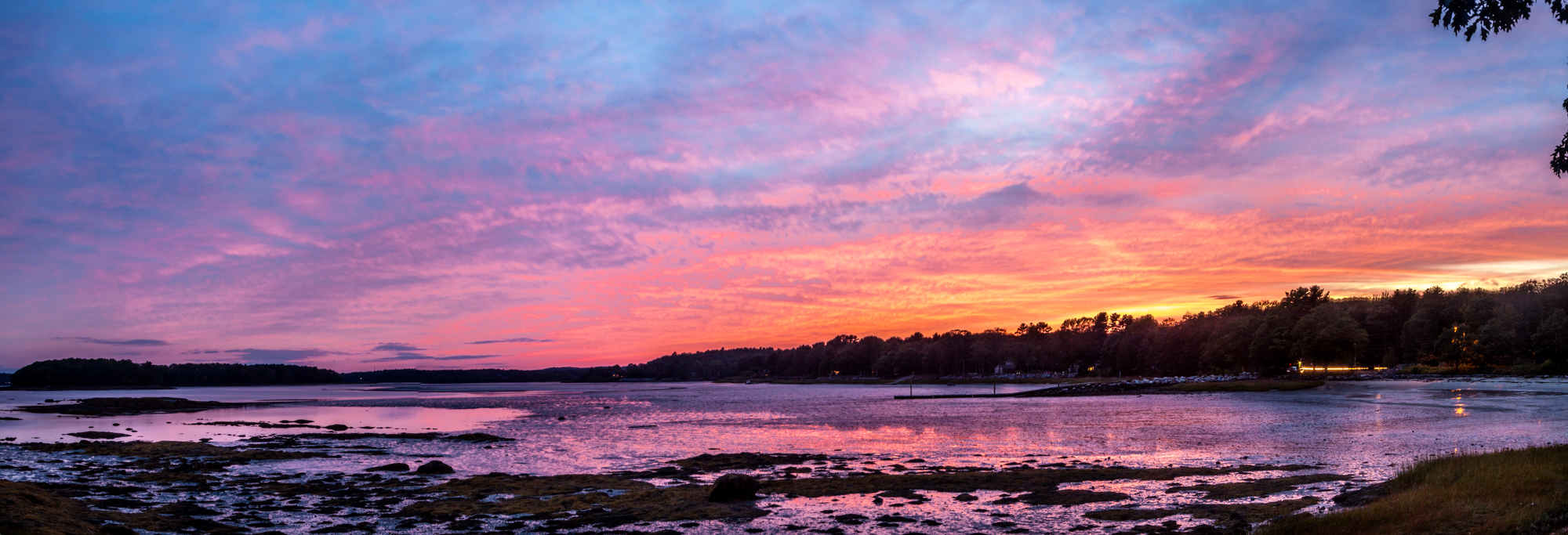
- Lanes Island (left), looking south from Winslow Memorial Park in Freeport
- Born: 1626; Rickmansworth, Hertfordshire, England
- Died: September 13, 1688 (aged ~62); North Yarmouth, Massachusetts Bay Colony
- Spouse: Sarah Ann White

James Lane (1626 – September 13, 1688) was a 17th-century English emigrant to the New England Colonies. He was one of the main early settlers of North Yarmouth, Massachusetts Bay Colony (now Yarmouth, Maine), along with compatriots John Cousins, William Royal and George Felt.

Lanes Island in Yarmouth is named for him. He was killed in 1688 on the island by Native Americans.

== Arrival in the Thirteen Colonies ==
Lane's family hailed from Rickmansworth, Hertfordshire, where he was born in 1626 to James Sr. and Katherine Russell. In 1654, Lane was a citizen and tradesman in London. By 1660, however, he had arrived in Malden, Massachusetts Bay Colony, where his brother, Job, had been living. He then moved north to Casco Bay, in today's Maine, settling on the eastern side of Cousins River.

== Personal life ==
It is believed Lane's wife was named Sarah Ann White, with whom had a daughter (Ann) and five sons (John, Samuel, Henry, Job and James).

He became chief officer of the North Yarmouth Military Company between 1665 and 1666.

== Death ==
In June 1675, the local Native Americans began a "war of extermination" against the settlers who were encroaching on their fishing ground. What is now known as Lanes Island, the first island at the mouth of the Royal River, was their council ground, and its western end their burial ground. Lane was the first of their victims, on September 13, 1688, followed the next day by two sons of Mr. Hazelton, who had recently purchased the remaining half of Cousins Island. They were hunting cattle in the woods when they were captured.

He was buried on September 14 in Falmouth Foreside Cemetery.

== Legacy ==
James Lane of North Yarmouth, Me. and his Descendants, written by James Pillsbury Lane, was published as a Scholar Select item in 2016.
