= Drinkwater (disambiguation) =

Drinkwater is a surname.

Drinkwater may also refer to:

- Drinkwater (film), a 2021 Canadian coming-of-age comedy film
- Drinkwater, Saskatchewan, a village in Canada
- Drinkwater Meadows (1799–1869), English actor
- Drinkwater Park, a woodland park in Greater Manchester, England
- Drinkwater Point, a promontory in Yarmouth, Maine
- Drinkwater Point Road, a street in Yarmouth, Maine

== See also ==
- Drinking water
