= Walter S. Wyman =

American businessman

- Born: Walter Scott Wyman; May 6, 1874; West Waterville, Maine, U.S.
- Died: November 15, 1942 (aged 68); Maine, U.S.
- Resting place: Forest Grove Cemetery, Augusta, Maine, U.S.

Walter Scott Wyman (May 6, 1874 – November 15, 1942) was an American businessman. He was one of the two founders of Central Maine Power (CMP), whose Wyman Power Station is now named for his son, William Frizzell Wyman, the former president of CMP.

== Life and career ==
Wyman was born in West Waterville, Maine, in 1874. He studied electrical engineering at Tufts University. During summer breaks, he managed the Western Union office in Bar Harbor. He left Tufts after his junior year, becoming general manager of the Waterville and Fairfield Railway and Electric Company.

In 1899, he founded Central Maine Power with his friend Harvey Doane Eaton. They started out in a building, formerly owned by Oakland Electric Light Company, on Messalonskee Stream.

With his wife, Massachusetts native Alice Mabel Bartlett, he had two known children: William (1902–1962) and Dorothy (1905–1993).

== Death ==
Wyman died in 1942, aged 68. He had suffered a cardiac arrest. He is interred in Forest Grove Cemetery in Augusta, Maine. His wife was buried beside him upon her death four years later.

His son built Wyman Power Station, on Cousins Island in Yarmouth, Maine, in 1959, three years before his own death.

=== Legacy ===
In 1949, he was the subject of William Bertram Skelton's book Walter S. Wyman: One of Maine's Great Pioneers.
