= Drinkwater Point =

- Promontory
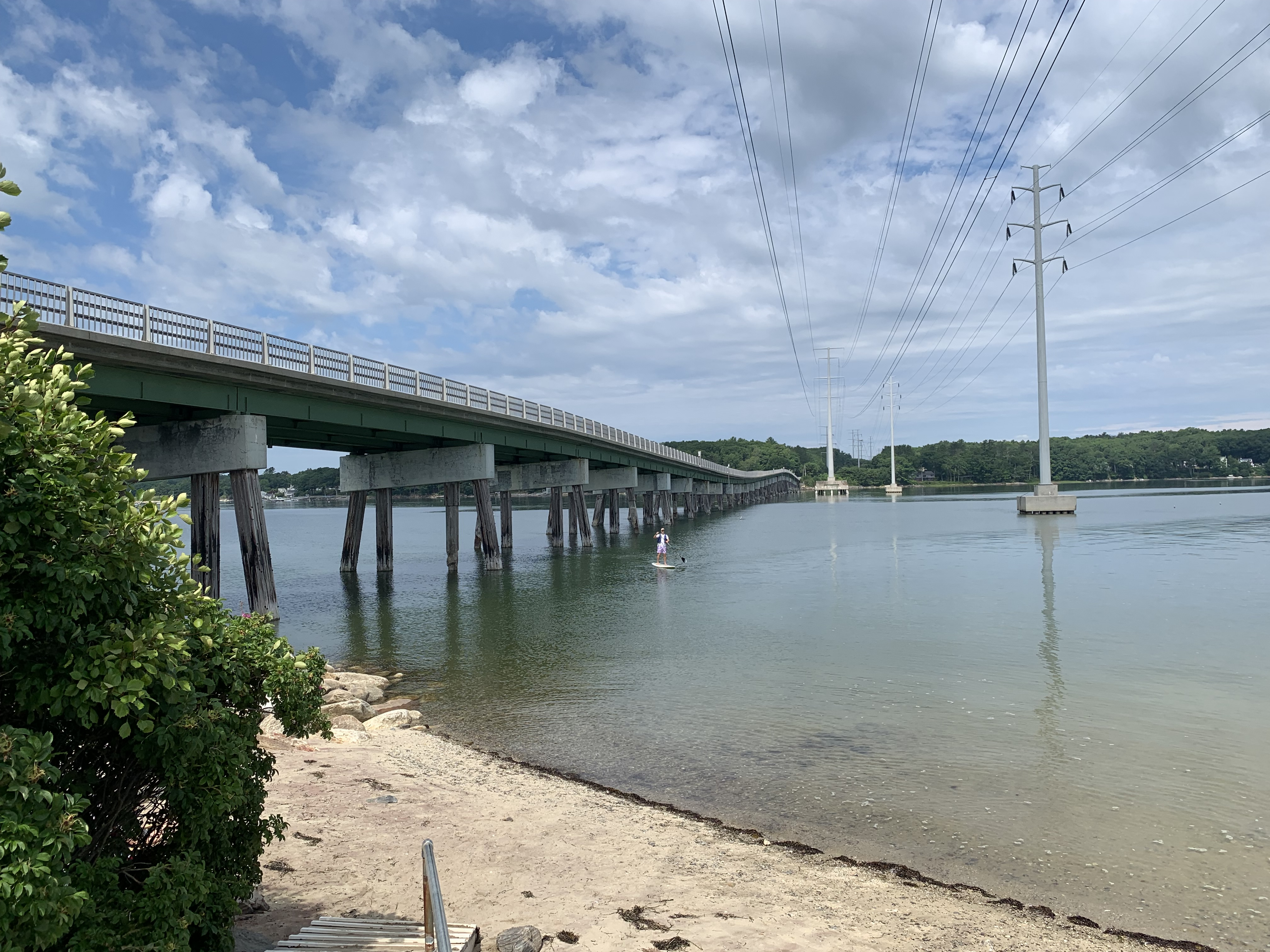
- Drinkwater Point viewed from Sandy Point Beach on Cousins Island
- Interactive map of Drinkwater Point
- Coordinates: 43.775889026°N 70.153733486°W
- Country: United States
- State: Maine
- County: Cumberland
- Town: Yarmouth
- Time zone: UTC-5 (Eastern (EST))
  - Summer (DST): UTC-4 (EDT)

Drinkwater Point is a promontory in Yarmouth, Maine, United States. It is located 2.35 miles (3.78 km) southeast of Yarmouth Village and looks out into inner Casco Bay and Cousins Island. Gilman Road leads to the point itself, where the Ellis C. Snodgrass Memorial Bridge connects mainland Yarmouth to Cousins Island.

Drinkwater Point and nearby Drinkwater Point Road are named for Captain Theophilus Drinkwater, son of Allen and Hannah Drinkwater. His house, built in 1791 by his grandfather, Nicholas, stood at the southern end of Drinkwater Point Road.
