= Andy's Handy Store =

Historic building in Yarmouth, Maine

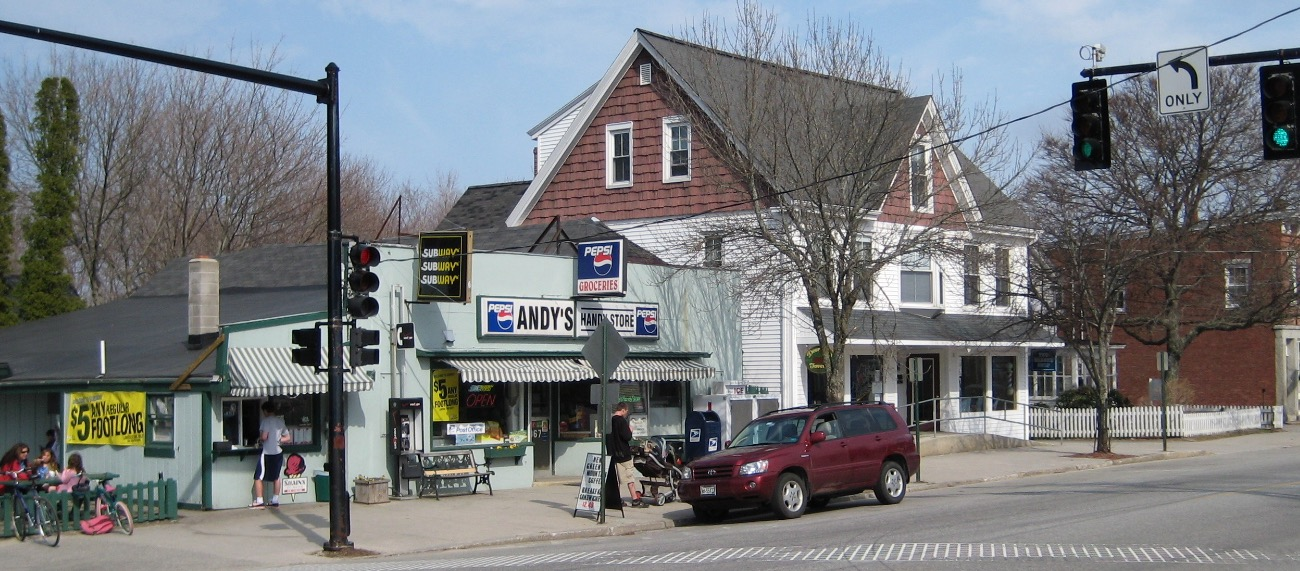
- The building (closest to the camera) in 2008, looking east from Latchstring Park, when it was still Andy's Handy Store
- Interactive map of the Andy's Handy Store area

General information
- Location: 367 Main Street, Yarmouth, Maine, United States
- Coordinates: 43.8036°N 70.1934°W
- Completed: 1935 (91 years ago)

Technical details
- Floor count: 2

Andy's Handy Store, colloquially known as Handy Andy's, is a historic building in Yarmouth, Maine, United States. Located at 367 Main Street, at its junction with Elm Street in the town's Upper Village, part of the building dates to 1891. It has been the home to over thirty businesses. As of 2025, restaurant Salsa occupies the entire building.

The first phone call between Yarmouth and Portland, Maine's largest city, was made from the premises.

== History ==
In 1807, Nathaniel Baker's nail store stood at the corner of Main Street and what was then known as Mill Street (prior to the construction of today's Mill Street, located near to where the Forest Paper Company formerly stood).

In 1891, Nathaniel Foster's pottery was torn down, after about fifty years in existence, and a new building was constructed in its place.

The building was later the home of the hardware store of John Ambrose Griffin (1838–1905).

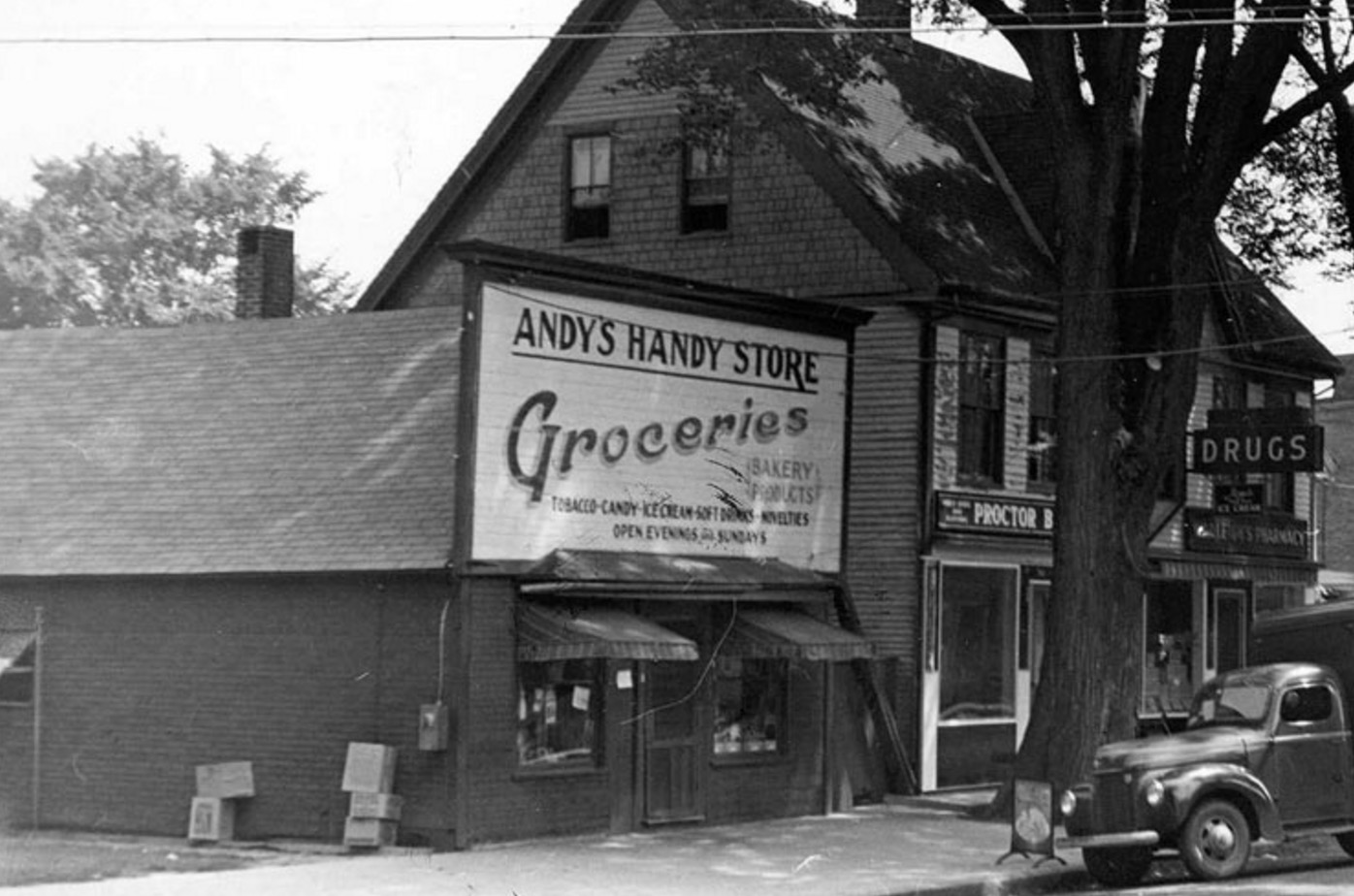
The building, left, prior to its expansion to the west in 1947

Between 1906 and 1935, Arthur and Harry Storer's hardware store, Storer Bros., occupied the premises, which included a bakery run by Freeland A. Knight. Other early owners included Lester and Orland Blake (of the Brown's Point family), who ran Blake Bros. Bakery.

Joe Arsenault's electrical shop occupied the premises for a short while thereafter.

It is believed Abbie Hines Maley briefly ran a luncheonette in the building between 1927 and 1929. This was followed by an equally short stint in the shape of Charlie Chase's Variety. His business was not a success, unlike its successor, another variety store run by Andrew Antonio, an African American. Antonio's business closed after a year, however.

Earle Hayes ran a drug store from the property, prior to moving to Gray. Phil Morrill's Variety Store moved into the vacated space.

In 1935, the property became Andy's Handy Store – named for proprietor, Leland "Andy" Anderson. In 1945, Anderson combined the two wooden buildings of Griffin's and an adjacent grocery store (which sold produce "at Portland prices"). Anderson sold the business in 1953.

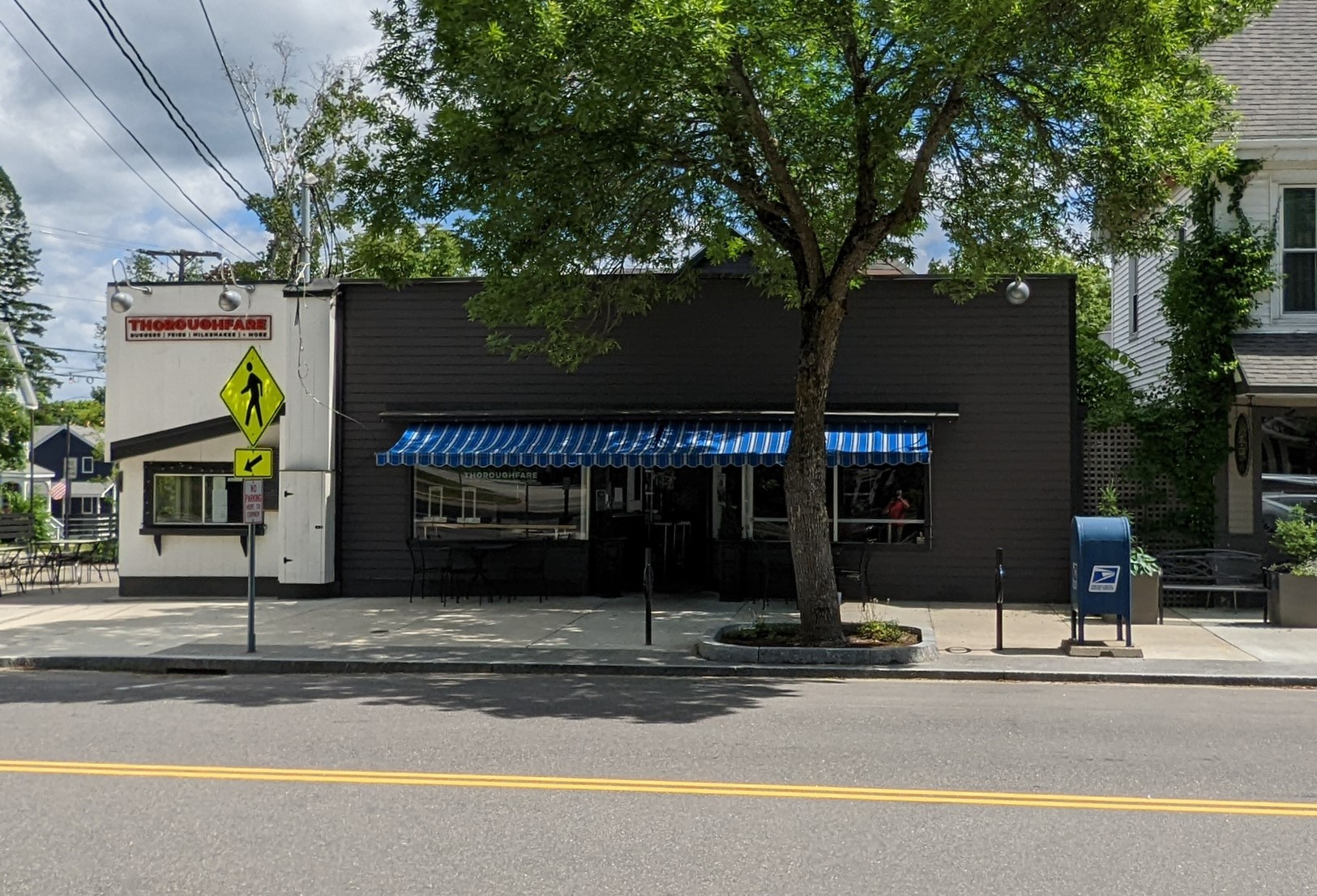
The building in 2022, then home to Thoroughfare

When Yarmouth's post office moved from the Brickyard Hollow section of Main Street in the late 1990s, the then owners of Handy's, Glenn and Susan McAllister, signed a contract to provide postal services at their store. This "auxiliary mail station" status was removed in 2013, except for the sale of stamps.

It became occupied by OTTO Pizza in 2014, then a grocery store and café, called The Nook, with the building known collectively as Handy's.

Thoroughfare occupied the entire building between early 2022 and September 2024. Christian Hayes and Christine Hayes, who also own Dandelion Catering, named it Dandy's Handy Store (word play on the name of the latter business) prior to converting the premises to its current format.

== See also ==
- Historical buildings and structures of Yarmouth, Maine
