= Drinkwater Point Road =

Prominent street in Yarmouth, Maine

Coordinates: 43.778683°N 70.159769°W

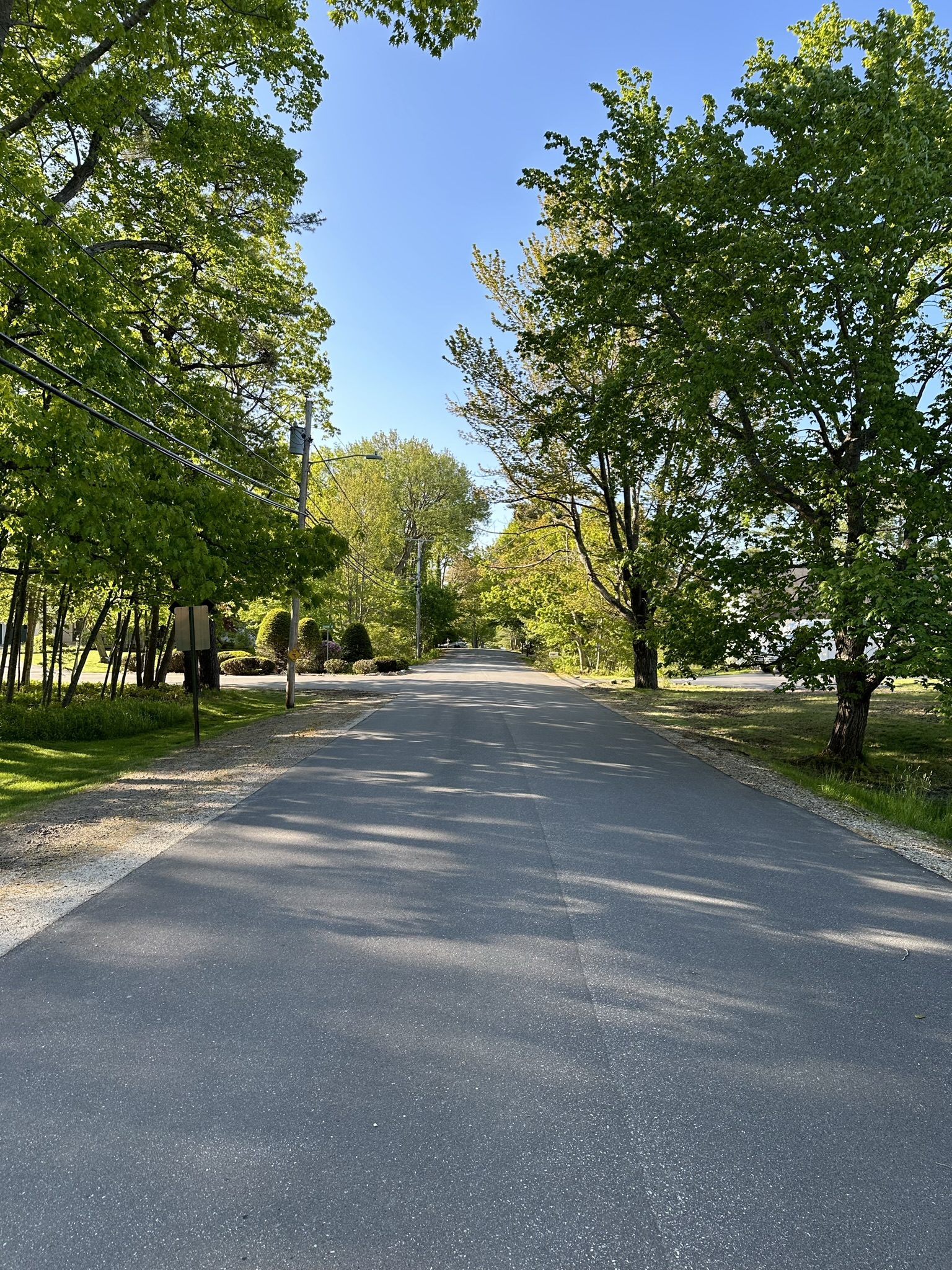
- Looking south toward Drinkwater Point
- Interactive map of Drinkwater Point Road
- Namesake: Theophilus Drinkwater
- Length: 0.45 mi (0.72 km)
- Location: Yarmouth, Maine, U.S.
- Northern end: Gilman Road
- Southern end: Seaborne Drive

Construction
- Completion: c. 1780 (246 years ago)

Drinkwater Point Road is a prominent street in Yarmouth, Maine, United States. One of the first streets laid out in what was then coastal North Yarmouth, Province of Massachusetts Bay (when it was centered around the nearby Meetinghouse under the Ledge), it runs for about 0.45 miles (0.72 km) from Gilman Road in the north to Seaborne Drive in the south. Drinkwater Point faces Cousins Island, to which it is connected by the Ellis C. Snodgrass Memorial Bridge, and overlooks inner Casco Bay.

Drinkwater Point Road and Drinkwater Point are named for Captain Theophilus Drinkwater, son of Allen and Hannah Drinkwater. His house, built in 1791 by his grandfather, Nicholas, stood at the southern end. Theophilus was married to Louisa Drinkwater. They had three children — Cornelia Amanda, Hannah Gray and Ferdinand. Theophilus, Louisa, Cornelia and Ferdinand are buried in the nearby Ledge Cemetery. Several other members of the notable seafaring Drinkwater family, lived nearby, including Captain Joseph Drinkwater.

Captain James Munroe Bucknam's 115-acre farm extended west to where Bucknam Point Road is today. His house, today's number 215, was built in 1740 and later became the main building of the Homewood Inn development, whose property extended to the north and west. Bucknam wed Caroline Pierce Drinkwater in 1843 and they had five children together — Nicholas, Clarence Leland, Caroline Augusta, Clarence Loraine and James M., Jr. They were married for 26 years, until 1869, Caroline's death. He married for a second time the following year, to Abbie Frances Twombly, with whom he had another two children — Caroline Prince Bucknam and Albion Levi. Nine years after Abbie's death, he married for a third time, to Edna A. Marston, widow of William.

Seaborne Drive and Channel Point Road appeared on a 1944 map of the town, as did Homewood Inn, which attracted guests from 1912 to 1992.

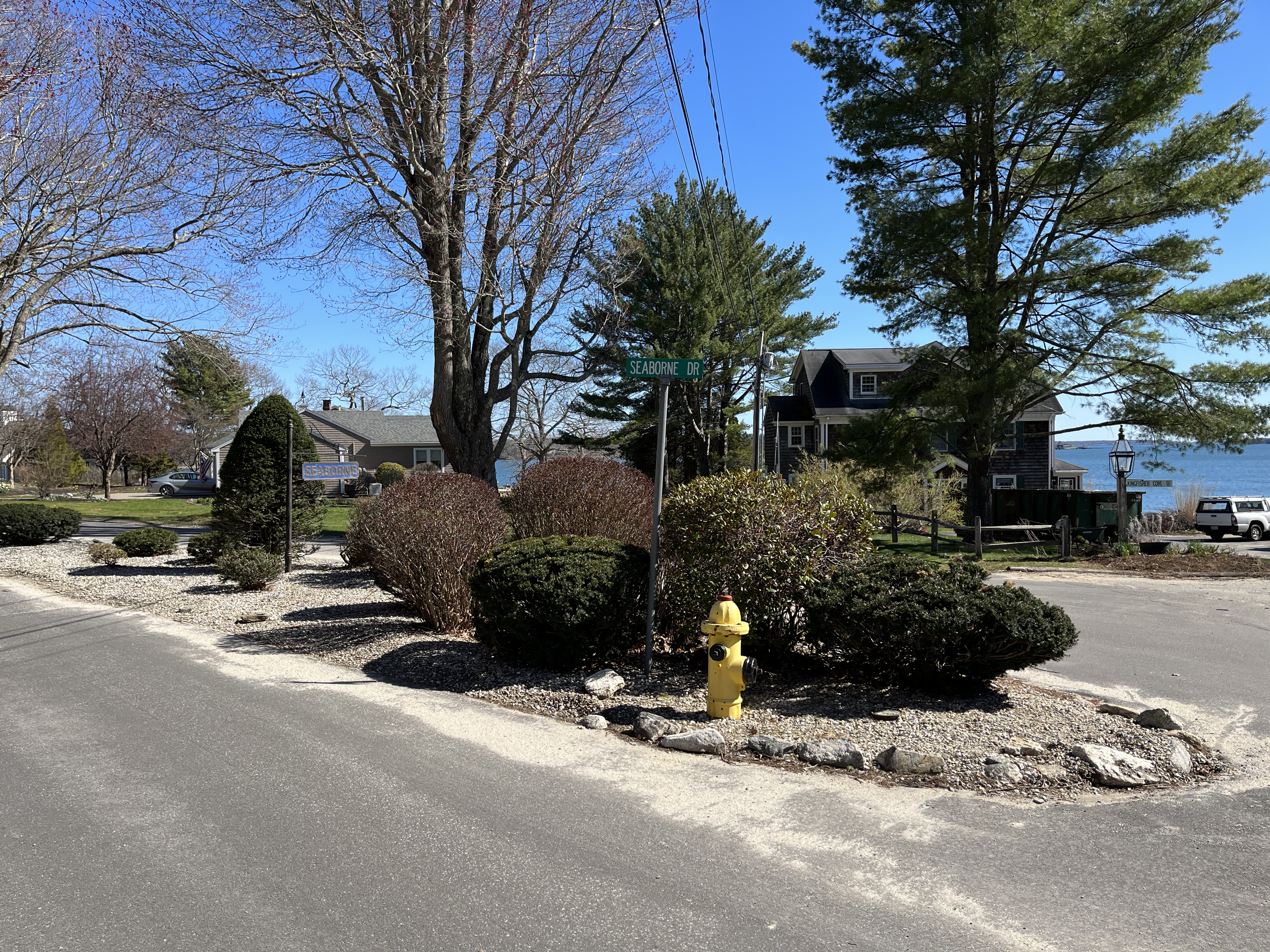
The circle at the junction of Drinkwater Point Road and Seaborne Drive, with the waters of inner Casco Bay in the background

The West Side Trail crosses the road near its intersection with Gilman Road.

== Notable buildings and structures ==
- Captain James Munroe Bucknam House (1740)
- Homewood Inn (1912)
