= Littlejohn Island =

Littlejohn Island, Maine
- Census-designated place
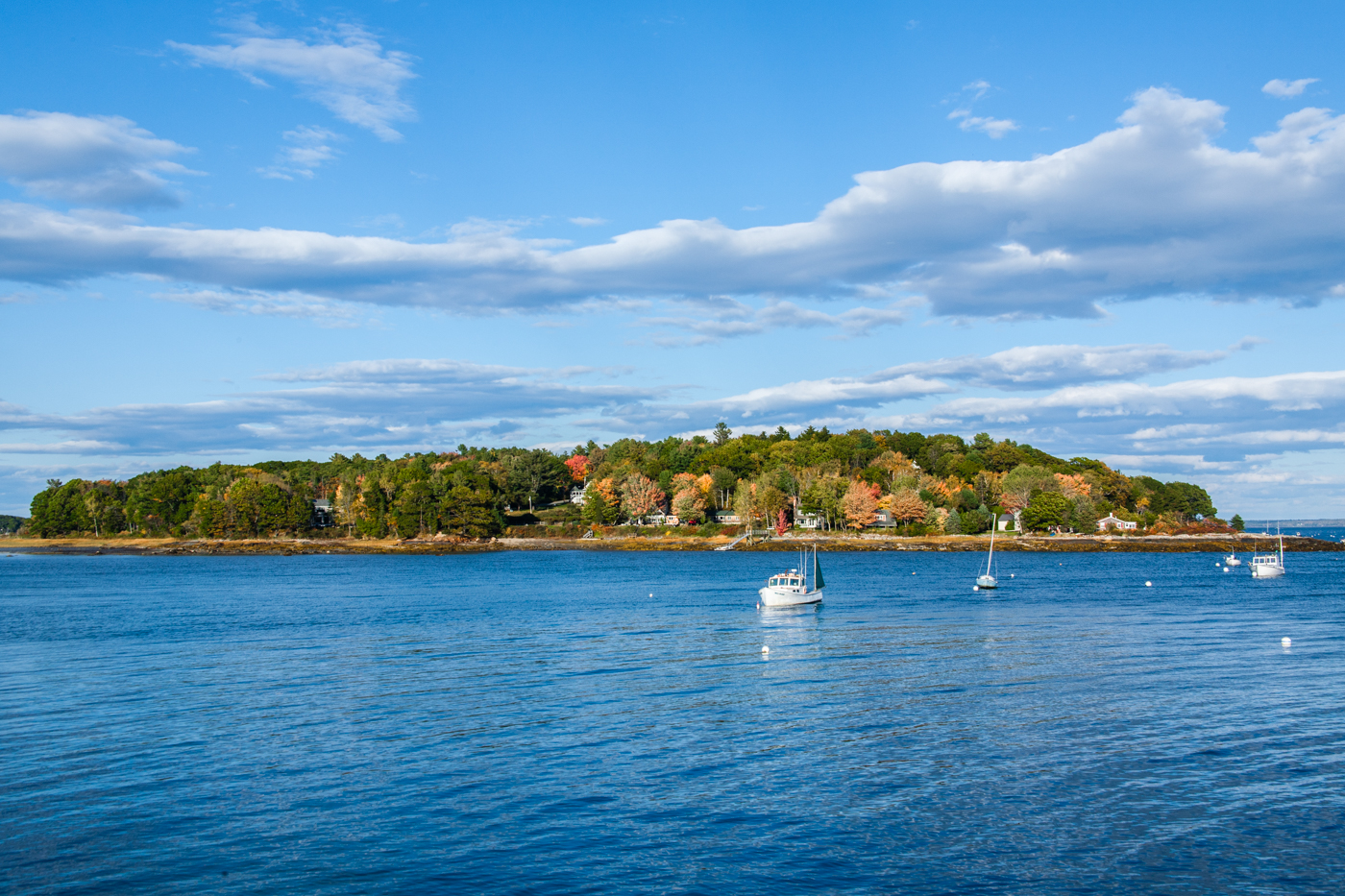
- Littlejohn Island viewed from Cousins Island

- Location in Cumberland County and the state of Maine
- Coordinates: 43°45′42″N 70°07′26″W
- Country: United States
- State: Maine
- County: Cumberland
- Town: Yarmouth

Area
  - Total: 0.73 sq mi (1.89 km^{2})
  - Land: 0.34 sq mi (0.88 km^{2})
  - Water: 0.39 sq mi (1.01 km^{2})
- Elevation: 59 ft (18 m)

Population (2020)
  - Total: 116
  - Density: 339.6/sq mi (131.13/km^{2})
- Time zone: UTC-5 (Eastern (EST))
  - Summer (DST): UTC-4 (EDT)
- ZIP Code: 04096 (Yarmouth)
- Area code: 207
- FIPS code: 23-40470
- GNIS feature ID: 2583560

Littlejohn Island is an island and census-designated place (CDP) in the town of Yarmouth in Cumberland County, Maine, United States. The population of the CDP was 118 at the 2010 census.

It is part of the Portland–South Portland–Biddeford, Maine Metropolitan Statistical Area.

The island, Cousins River and Cousins Island are named after Englishman John Cousins (1596–1682), who emigrated from Marlborough, Wiltshire.

== Geography ==
Littlejohn Island is located in Casco Bay and is connected by a causeway to Cousins Island, which is connected by a bridge to the mainland in Yarmouth. According to the United States Census Bureau, the Littlejohn Island CDP has a total area of 0.73 square miles (1.9 km^{2}), of which 0.35 square miles (0.9 km^{2}) is the island and 0.39 square miles (1.0 km^{2}), or 53.25%, is in the water surrounding the island.

== Population ==
Historical population
Census	Pop.	Note	%±
2020	116		—
U.S. Decennial Census
