= Homewood Inn =

Coordinates: 43.7745°N 70.1576°W

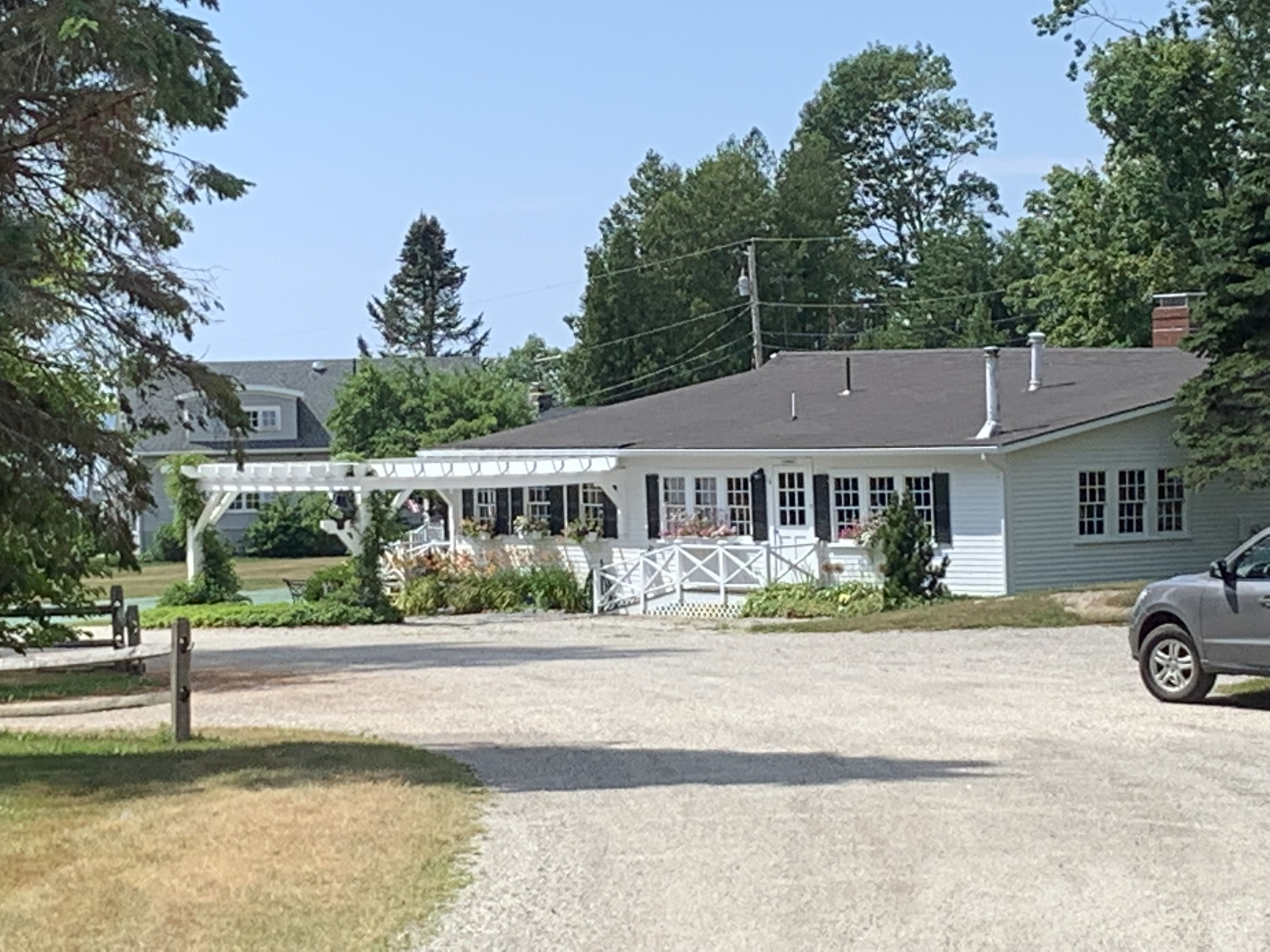
- One of the buildings that comprised the Homewood Inn development
- Company type: Inn
- Founded: 1912
- Defunct: 1992 (33 years ago)
- Headquarters: Yarmouth, Maine, U.S.
- Key people: Fred Webster Sr. Doris Webster; Fred Webster Jr. Colleen Webster

Homewood Inn is a former inn that was in business in Yarmouth, Maine, from 1912 to 1992. Although the buildings are still standing, they are now used as private residential units.

The original "Homewood" was built in the 18th century by "rugged coastmen."

== History ==
Prior to the construction of the buildings that made up the Homewood Inn development, Captain James Munroe Bucknam's 115-acre farm occupied the area. His home, today's 215 Drinkwater Point Road, built in 1740, is the former main building of the complex, originally known as Trimble Farm. Bucknam's land extended west to where Bucknam Point Road is today. The inn's official address was 196 Drinkwater Point Road.

In 1915, Burton Prentiss Lyman (1878–1942) was the proprietor of "The Homewood and Cottages" at "Yarmouth-by-the-Sea."

Fred and Doris Webster founded the Homewood Inn in 1942. Their son, Fred Jr., took over the business and ran it with his wife, Colleen.

In the 1950s, Bette Davis stayed at the inn for six months, which she mentioned in her autobiography:

When I was well enough, we said good-bye to New York, loaded the station wagon, Gary and I, a governess and the three children -- plus Tinker Belle, B.D.'s poodle and a parakeet in a cage -- and drove to Homewood Inn in Yarmouth, Maine, which Gary had found for us. We arrived there in April and stayed until September.

The property is a few hundred feet from the shores of Casco Bay, which was a big draw for its guests.

Fred Webster Sr. died in 1974, aged 77. Doris survived him by 17 years, and is buried beside her husband in Yarmouth's Riverside Cemetery. Fred Jr. died in 2015, aged 84. Colleen survived him by five years. Upon her death in 2020, aged 89, she was also buried beside her husband at Riverside Cemetery.

The inn closed in 1992, a year after Doris's death at the age of 89, after fifty years in business.

== See also ==
- Historical buildings and structures of Yarmouth, Maine
