= Madeleine Point =

- Promontory
- Interactive map of Madeleine Point
- Coordinates: 43.7574645°N 70.1504217°W
- Country: United States
- State: Maine
- County: Cumberland
- Town: Yarmouth
- Time zone: UTC-5 (Eastern (EST))
  - Summer (DST): UTC-4 (EDT)

Madeleine Point is a promontory on Cousins Island in Yarmouth, Maine, United States. It is located around 3.44 miles (5.54 km) south of Yarmouth Village and looks out into inner Casco Bay, back toward mainland Yarmouth.

It is accessed by Madeleine Point Road, which is off Cousins Street.
