= Christian Hayes (chef) =

American chef & restaurateur (born 1980)

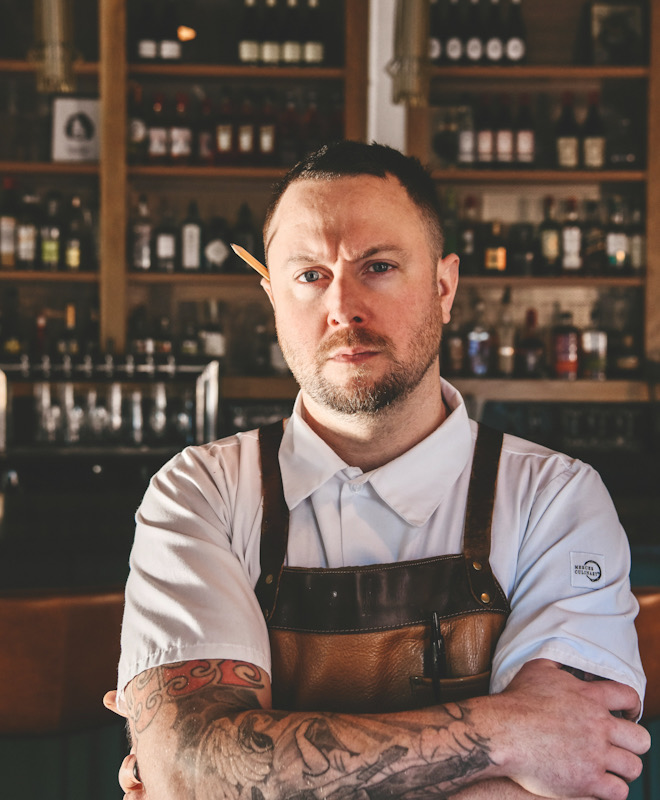
- Hayes in 2021
- Born: March 10, 1980 (age 46); Portland, Maine, U.S.
- Culinary career
- Cooking style: New American; Asian; Mediterranean; Farm-to-table
- Current restaurants: Dandelion Catering; Sparhawk Tavern (pop-up)
- Previous restaurants: The Garrison; Thoroughfare; Dandy's Yarmouth
- Television show(s): Chopped (winner, "Pork on the Brain", March 2019)

Christian Hayes (born March 10, 1980) is a chef and restaurateur from Portland, Maine, United States. Between 2019 and 2024, he was the owner and executive chef at The Garrison, a restaurant in Yarmouth, Maine. He was the winner of Food Network's Chopped episode "Pork on the Brain" in March 2018.

Since 2009, Hayes has also co-owned, with his wife Christine, Dandelion Catering Company, which is based out of Yarmouth's Sparhawk Mill. Initially operating out of a community kitchen in Portland, it went full-time in 2013, when they moved into the historic Sparhawk Mill on the Royal River in Yarmouth. During the temporary closure of his full-service restaurant during the COVID-19 pandemic, in February 2021 Hayes switched gears and went on the offense to open his second restaurant and third enterprise, Thoroughfare, located on Yarmouth's Main Street in a landmark corner store, originally known as Andy's Handy Store (colloquially Handy Andy's), which has been a fixture of the town since the 1930s.

Between 2003 and 2012, Hayes was a musician and the frontman, playing guitar and lead vocals, for the Portland-based band Sidecar Radio. They released four studio albums throughout their career, gaining commercial radio success and sharing the stage with such acts as 311, Seether, Bush, State Radio, Sick Puppies, and Mickey Avalon.

== Career ==
A cook since 1997, Hayes has formerly worked at the now-defunct Asian-inspired fine-dining and dim sum restaurant Natasha's, in Portland, under chef Jesse Souza and his wife, Christine Hayes, then sous-chef. He started his career in quick-service breakfast spots, then steakhouses, sports bars, bakeries, and fine dining throughout the city of Portland.

In 2008, Hayes and his wife launched Dandelion Catering, with the intent of providing restaurant quality, locally sourced cuisine at full-service events such as weddings, in an industry primarily known for relying on premade and frozen ingredients. Hayes ended up leaving the music industry entirely within three years of the launch to focus strictly on Dandelion Catering with his wife.

In March 2018, prior to his first restaurant opening, Hayes appeared on Food Network's long-running series Chopped to compete in a pork-themed episode, which he won, utilizing such whole animal parts such as pork brains, cheeks, blood pudding, lardo, and more.

In July 2019, Hayes and his wife opened The Garrison, an intimate restaurant perched on the Royal River in Yarmouth, Maine, to critical and regional success.

When the COVID-19 pandemic forced The Garrison to close its doors to indoor dining in March 2020, Hayes branded a take-out operation named Thoroughfare out of the restaurant's kitchen and focused on indulgent, fast-food style menu items such as smash burgers, fried chicken sandwiches, and fries. The branding paid off when an historic Main Street property became available and Thoroughfare moved its operation and launched its own storefront, patio, and take-out window. The Garrison closed in July 2024 after five years in operation; Thoroughfare closed shortly thereafter.

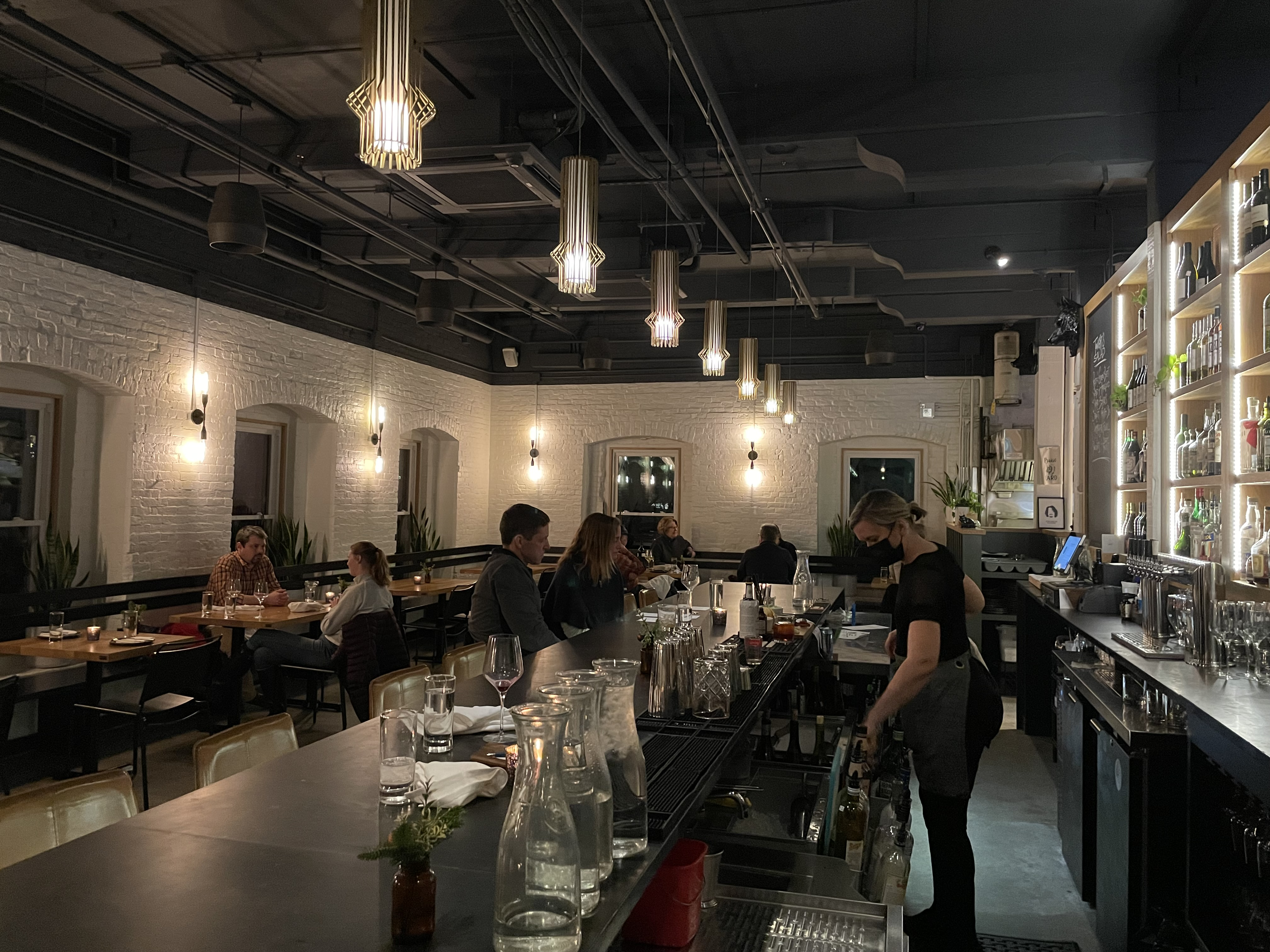
The Garrison, in Yarmouth's Sparhawk Mill, 2021

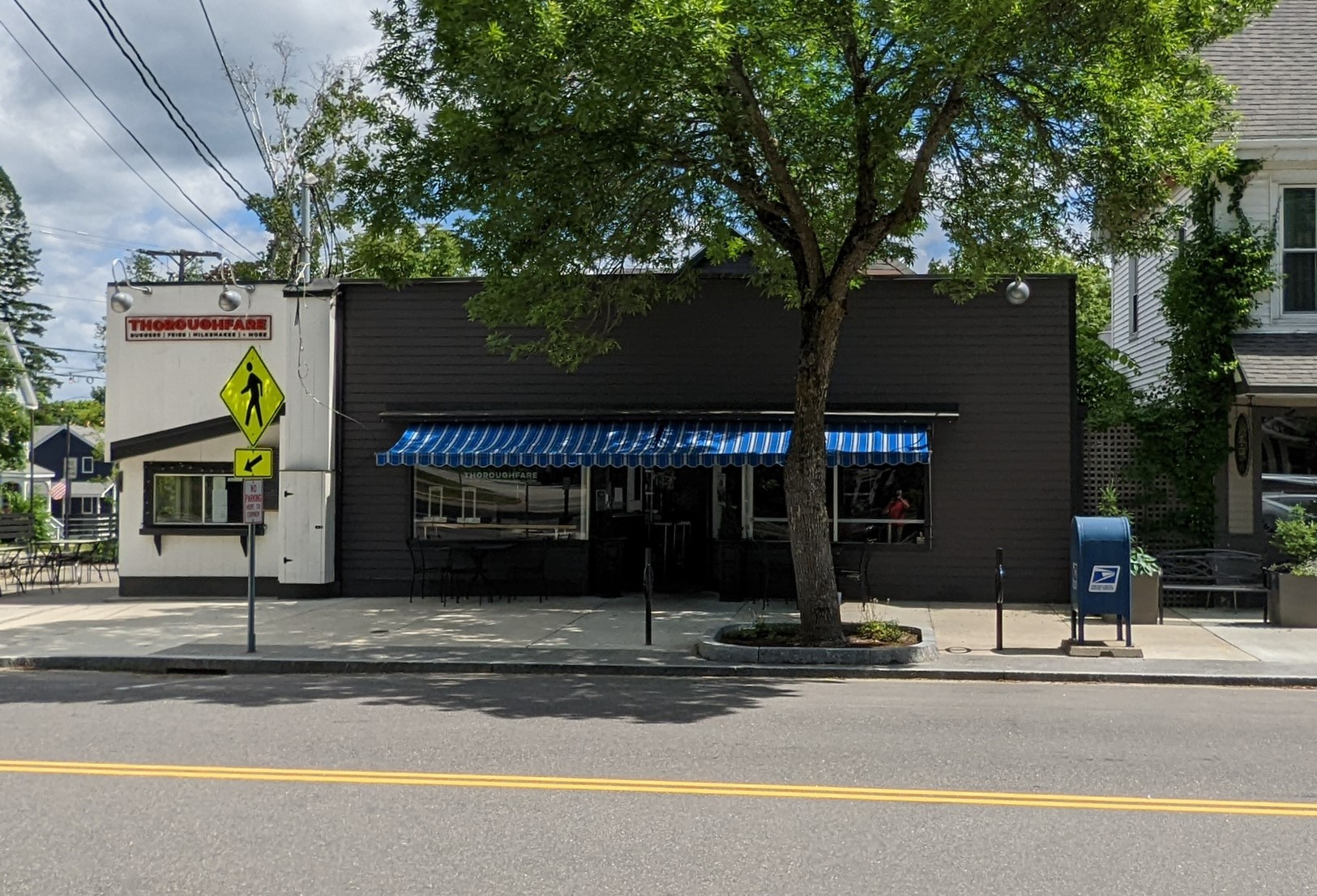
Thoroughfare, Main Street, Yarmouth, 2022

In 2025, Hayes launched Sparhawk Tavern, a pop-up restaurant in the former Garrison space.

== Humanitarian work ==
In 2022, Hayes departed for two weeks as a part of the Chef Relief Team for Chef José Andrés’ organization World Central Kitchen campaign Chefs for Ukraine, stationed in the Poland/Ukrainian border cities of Przemysl and Medyka, where he cooked and provided meals for the tens of thousands of refugees fleeing daily.

Since 2015, and even during the COVID-19 pandemic, which shut down his businesses for almost eighteen months, Hayes and his wife’s teams have prepared and donated Thanksgiving dinners to Maine families in need, to whom Hayes would deliver alongside his young daughters.

In October 2022, Hayes was named one of Maine Magazine's 'Mainers of the Year', particularly for his work overseas with World Central Kitchen.

== Personal life ==
Hayes is a seventh-generation Mainer, and was raised primarily by his mother.

He is married to Christine Hayes, with whom he has been since 2003 (married since 2008); they have two children. Their relationship began when they both worked at Big Sky Bakery in Portland, Maine. She co-owns and co-founded Dandelion Catering, The Garrison, and Thoroughfare with Hayes, and is the director of human services and general manager for the hospitality group.
