= Gary King (broadcaster) =

American businessman and radio personality

- Born: July 24, 1934; Pownal, Maine, U.S.
- Died: August 28, 2019 (aged 85)
- Resting place: Old Baptist Cemetery, Yarmouth, Maine
- Known for: founding WYAR and the Heritage Radio Society
- Spouse: Lois Brown (1956–2004; her death)
- Parent(s): Charles H. King; Marion Noyes

Gary Dennis King (July 24, 1934 – August 28, 2019) was an American businessman and radio personality. He founded WYAR, in Yarmouth, Maine, in 1998. He established the Heritage Radio Society three years earlier.

== Early life ==
King was born in Pownal, Maine, in 1934, to Charles King and Marion Noyes. He moved to Yarmouth, Maine, during his childhood, and lived on East Elm Street.

He served as a radio operator in the United States Army Signal Corps in Germany at the conclusion of World War II.

== Career ==
After returning to Maine from military service, King worked as an announcer on WCME and WCSH. At WCSH, he became a television engineer, then a program director.

In 1995, he established the Heritage Radio Society. Three years later, WYAR went on the air in the basement of their home on Cousins Island, Maine. He served as the station's chief operator and manager for the next fifteen years.

== Personal life ==
In 1956, King married Lois Brown, whom he had known since he was eight years old. They had four sons.

King played the banjo, and was a member of the Ken MacKenzie band, a local group.

== Death ==
King died in 2019, aged 85, after a battle with Parkinson's disease. He had survived his wife by fifteen years. They are both interred in Yarmouth's Old Baptist Cemetery.
