= Ellis C. Snodgrass Memorial Bridge =

Bridge in Casco Bay, Maine, U.S.

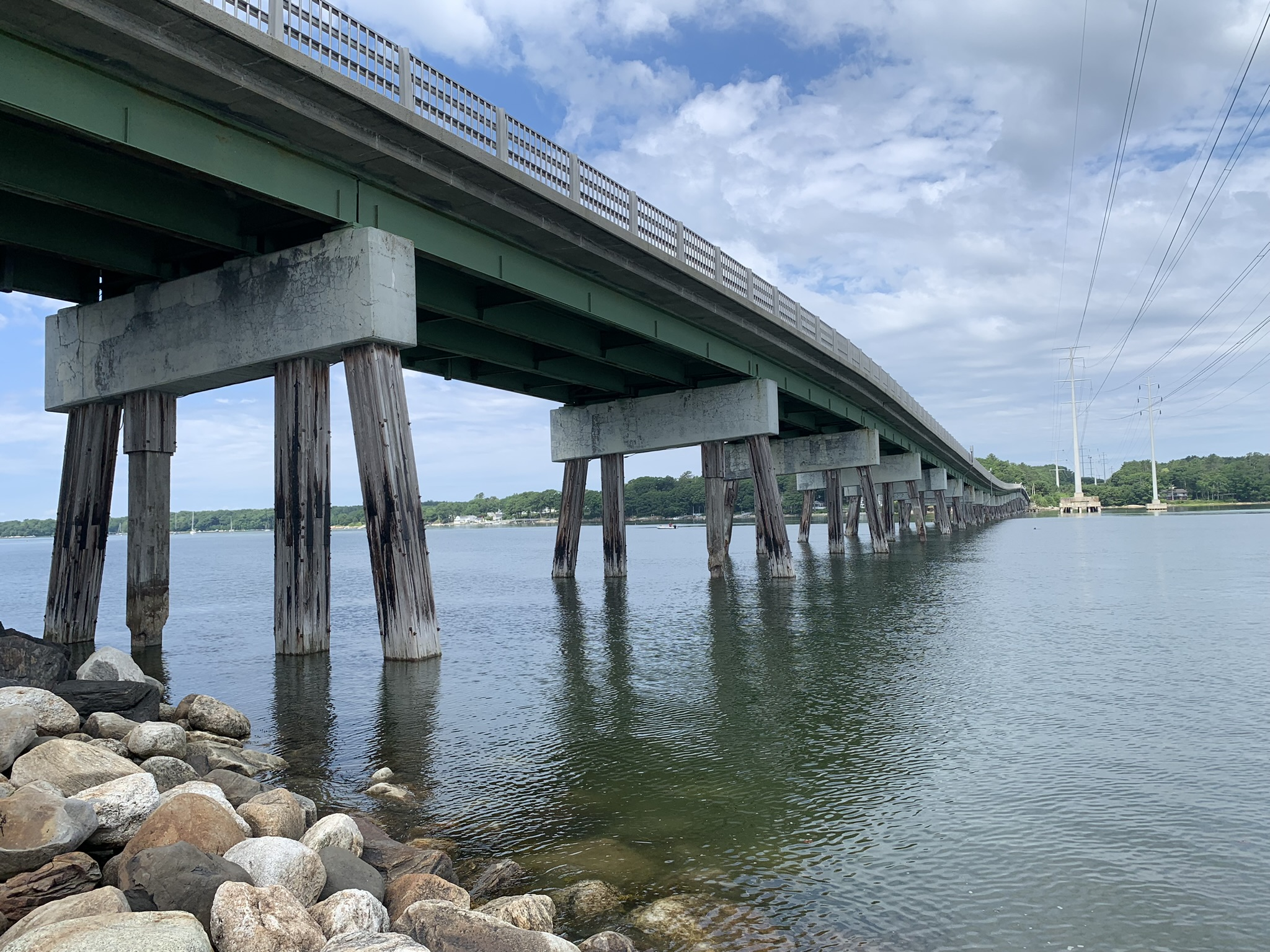
- The bridge viewed from Sandy Point on Cousins Island, looking northwest toward the mainland
- Coordinates: 43.77472°N 70.14861°W
- Carries: Cousins Street
- Crosses: Casco Bay
- Locale: Yarmouth, Maine, U.S.
- Other name(s): Cousins Island Bridge
- Named for: Ellis C. Snodgrass

Characteristics
- Design: Steel stringer
- Total length: 1,991 feet (607 m)
- Width: 22 feet (7 m)
- Longest span: 59.1 feet (18 m)

History
- Opened: 1955 (70 years ago)

The Ellis C. Snodgrass Memorial Bridge is located in Yarmouth, Maine, United States. It spans a section of inner Casco Bay, connecting the mainland, at Drinkwater Point, to Cousins Island, at Sandy Point, hence it is also known as Cousins Island Bridge. It carries vehicular and pedestrian traffic of Cousins Street, and is the only means of access to and from Cousins Island, except by watercraft.

The bridge, which is named for its constructor Ellis C. Snodgrass, was built in 1955 to assist with the construction of Wyman Power Station. The bridge was renovated in 1992. It is 1,999.1 feet (609.3 m) long and 22 feet (6.7 m) wide.

As of 2016, an average of 2,240 vehicles crossed it daily.
