= WYAR =

- Yarmouth, Maine; United States
- Broadcast area: Portland area
- Frequency: 88.3 MHz

Programming
- Format: The American Musical Heritage

Ownership
- Owner: Heritage Radio Society, Inc.

History
- First air date: 1998 (28 years ago)
- Call sign meaning: YARmouth

Technical information
- Licensing authority: FCC
- Facility ID: 78242
- Class: A
- ERP: 1,000 watts
- HAAT: 24.0 meters (78.7 ft)
- Transmitter coordinates: 43°45′56″N 70°8′27″W

Links
- Public license information: Public file; LMS
- Website: wyar.org

WYAR (88.3 MHz) is a non-commercial radio station broadcasting an adult standards radio format. Licensed to Yarmouth, Maine, United States, with the transmitter and tower located on nearby Cousins Island, the station serves the Portland and Lewiston-Auburn area. The station, established by Gary King in 1998, is licensed to Heritage Radio Society, Inc., a 501(c)(3) non-profit corporation.

WYAR has a large collection of more than 10,000 78-rpm records, many of which have been enhanced by digital signal processing. The station also airs some early jazz programming and community issues and news.

== See also ==
- List of community radio stations in the United States
- 1988 in radio
