= Brown's Point =

- Promontory
- The now-destroyed Bay View Farm Inn and Cottages, c. 1930
- Interactive map of Brown's Point
- Coordinates: 43.79521028921°N 70.1500405138°W
- Country: United States
- State: Maine
- County: Cumberland
- Town: Yarmouth
- Time zone: UTC-5 (Eastern (EST))
  - Summer (DST): UTC-4 (EDT)

Brown's Point is a promontory in Yarmouth, Maine, United States. It is located around 1.90 miles (3.06 km) east of Yarmouth Village at the confluence of Cousins River, to the north, and Royal River, to the south. It sits across Cousins River from Powell Point and across Royal River from Callen Point. The point is accessible via Bayview Street.

The land was originally owned by English settler William Royall in the 16th century. Some of Royall's land was later transferred to Moses Brown, a farmer in whose family it remained for over three hundred years. The Browns' farmland was sold off in 1977, creating the Brown's Point Road development.

Mary Estelle Blake (1920–2017) was the last of the Brown family to live on the point.

The 100-acre (40-hectare) Bay View Farm Inn and Cottages stood on the point in the early 20th century. It burned down in 2008.
