= Theophilus Drinkwater =

American sea captain (1792–1872)

- Born: October 28, 1792; North Yarmouth, Massachusetts, U.S.
- Died: December 15, 1872 (aged 80); Yarmouth, Maine, U.S.
- Resting place: Ledge Cemetery, Yarmouth, Maine, U.S.
- Occupation: Sea captain
- Spouse: Louisa Prince (1822–1872; his death)

Theophilus Drinkwater (October 28, 1792 – December 15, 1872) was an American sea captain in the first half of the 19th century.

== Life and career ==
Drinkwater was born in 1792, in North Yarmouth, Massachusetts (now in Maine), to Allen and Hannah Drinkwater.

Drinkwater's house stood at the southern end of today's Drinkwater Point Road, for whom the street is named. The house was built in 1791 by his grandfather, Nicholas.

Theophilus married Louisa Prince in 1822. They had three children — Cornelia Amanda, Hannah Gray and Ferdinand.

Two months before Maine's admittance to the Union, Drinkwater became a founding member of the Chapel Religious Society in North Yarmouth.

In 1835, Drinkwater and his father purchased the homestead farm of Jonathan Moulton in North Yarmouth.

In 1853, he was listed as a stockholder in the Atlantic and St. Lawrence Railroad.

== Death ==
Drinkwater died in 1872, aged 80. He is interred in Yarmouth's Ledge Cemetery alongside his wife, who survived him by six years, and Cornelia.
