= William Royall (settler) =

- Born: c. 1595
- Died: 1676

William Royall (c. 1595–1676) was a 17th-century English emigrant to the New England Colonies. The Royal River in Maine is named for him. (It was named Yarmouth River at the time of his inhabitance in the area, which was then part of Massachusetts Bay Colony.)

Royall arrived in North Yarmouth a year or so after his compatriot John Cousins (c. 1596–1682), though Royall is regarded as the most important pioneer in the area.

== Royal River ==
The Native Americans called what is now known as the Royal River "Westcustogo River" (meaning muddy river) or "Pumgustuck River" (falls at mouth of river). A Portland Magazine article, "Muddy Waters," has prompted a conversation about whether or not the river should be returned to its original name, considering the Royall family's ties to slavery in Antigua. Sir Ronald Sanders, Ambassador for Antigua and Barbuda to the United States, says, "Heinous crimes of this nature have been celebrated in the name of this river. It should not require a great deal of difficulty to realize that celebration should be ended. That human life should be taken so easily and wantonly is wrong in itself." Daniel R. Coquillette, co-author of On the Battlefield of Merit, says, "Isaac Royall Sr. was a brutal man, even by the standards of his time. He didn't found Bowdoin College or anything. You could make it an easy case to change the river." Dr. Natasha Lightfoot, associate professor of history at Columbia University, says, "I would certainly change the name. Keeping the name of 'Royall River' makes the river a lasting monument to the violence of slavery and settler colonialism in the Americas. There were communities established in the area long before the arrival of any European settlers. I would suggest researching what First Nations/Native American peoples lived near the river and likely used it for their daily lives and commerce, and naming the river after them."

== Personal life ==
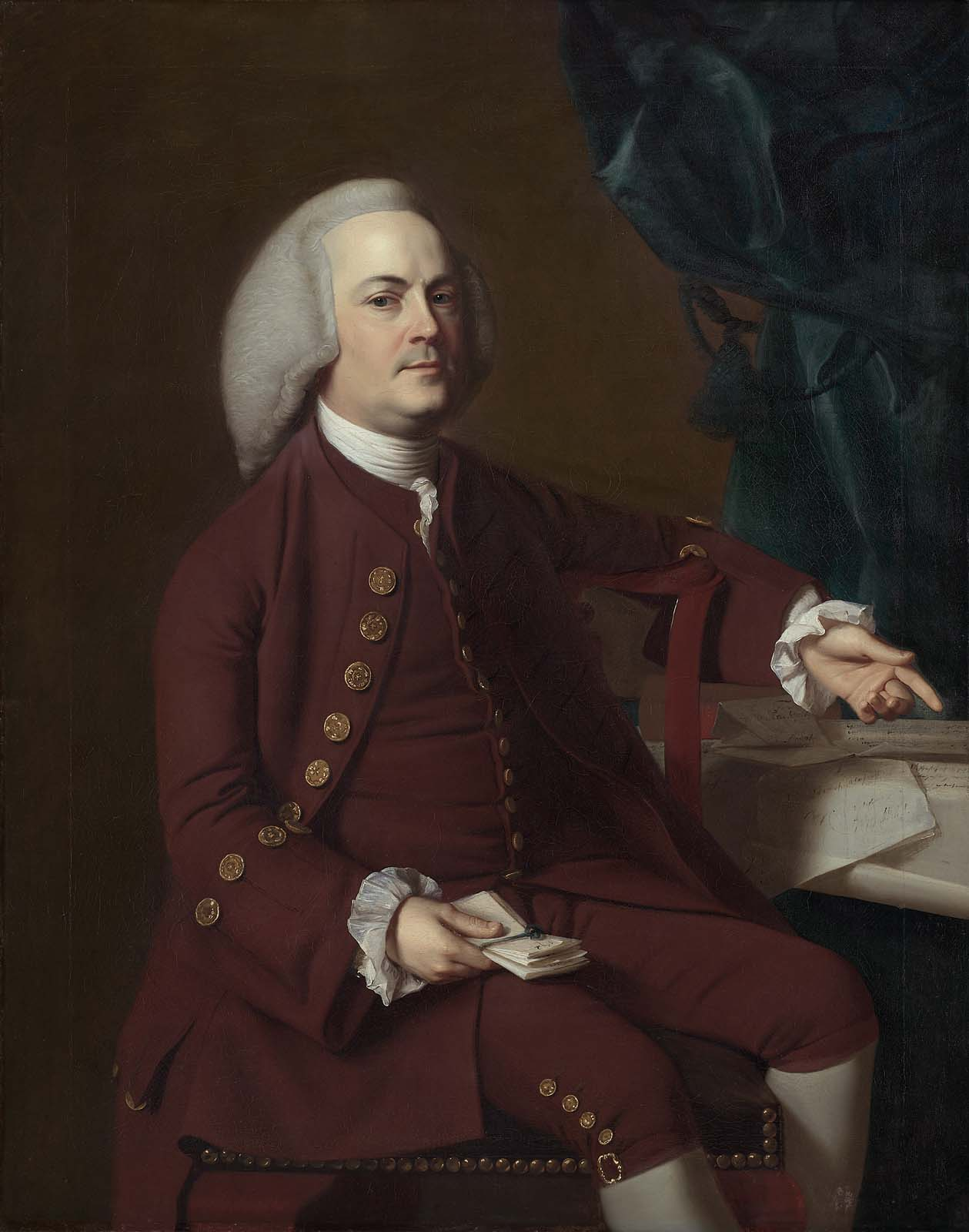
Royall's great-grandson, Isaac Royall Jr.

Royall emigrated from England (where he was a cooper) to Salem, Massachusetts Bay Colony, in July 1629, aboard the Lyon's Whelp. He became a servant in the Massachusetts Bay Colony Company, and after serving his seven years, he was provided with a land grant in the Casco Bay area of today's Maine. His first homestead was at Fogg's Point in Freeport.

In 1636, he purchased what became known as Royall's Farm at what is now the upscale Lambert Point, next to Redding Creek, at the southern tip of Lambert Road, where he lived with his wife, County Durham native Phoebe Green (1620–1678). They had thirteen children together between 1639 and 1657, the first being son William Jr. (1639–1724).

Royall purchased a large tract of land from Thomas Gorges in 1643.

Royall's family moved to Dorchester, Massachusetts Bay Colony, in 1675, a year before William Sr.'s death. Following in his grandfather's footsteps, some eighty years after the fact, Isaac's brother, Sam Royall (1696–1784), moved to North Yarmouth sometime after 1724. He died in the town in 1784. His son, Elijah (1724–1790), died six years later.

Royall's grandson, Isaac Royall Sr. (1677–1739), chose a life at sea, becoming a rum and sugar merchant, and sought to make his fortune in the slave trade. By 1700 he was in Antigua, part-owner of a Massachusetts-built slave called the Mayflower. His son, Isaac Royall Jr. (1719–1781), who played a crucial role in the founding of Harvard Law School, was born in Antigua.

== See also ==
- Brown's Point
