= Callen Point =

Callen Point Calling Point Cellen Point Cuttinge Pinte
- Promontory
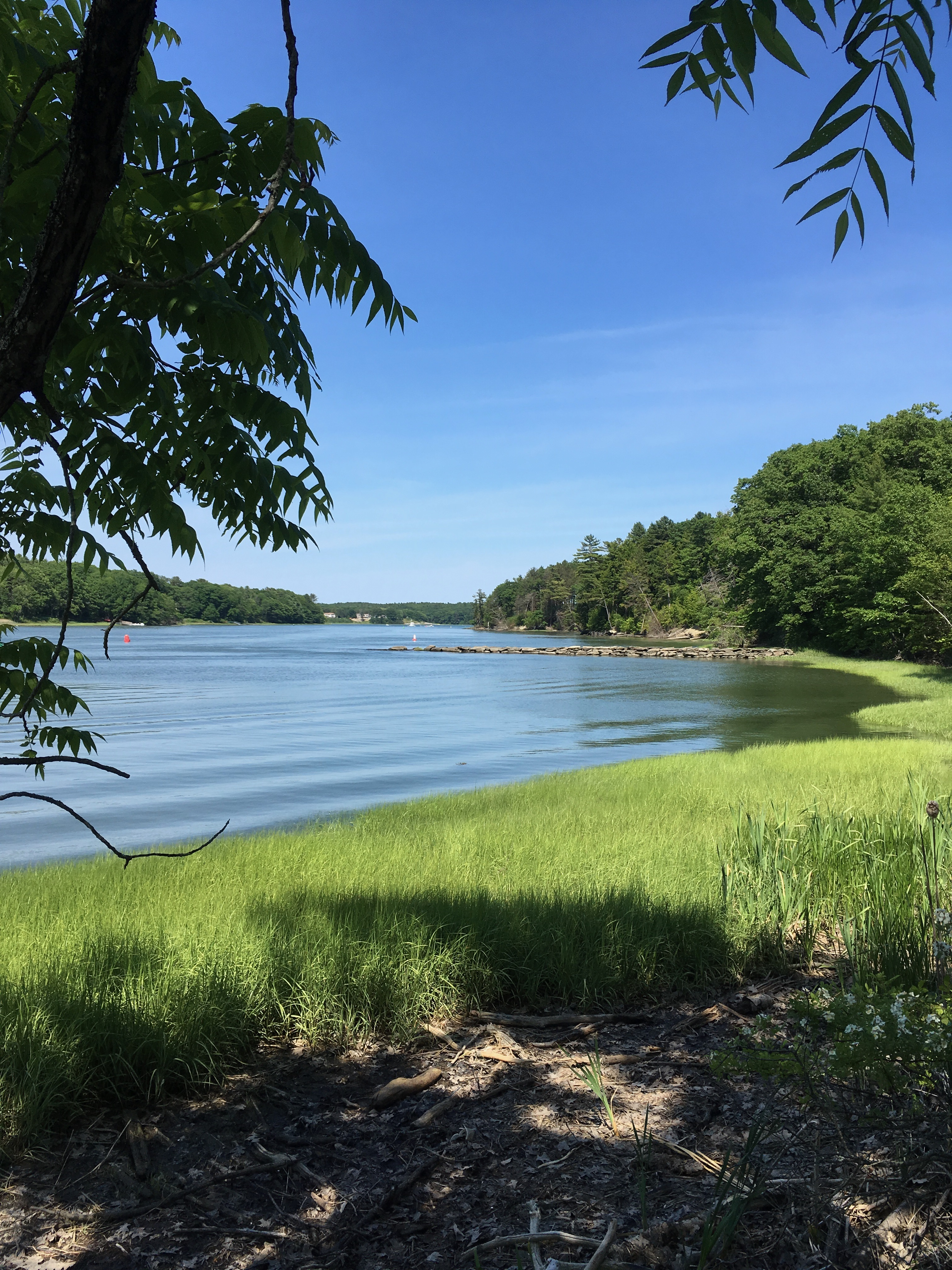
- Callen Point viewed from Larrabee's Landing, looking northeast
- Interactive map of Callen Point
- Coordinates: 43.7910277°N 70.153189°W
- Country: United States
- State: Maine
- County: Cumberland
- Town: Yarmouth
- Time zone: UTC-5 (Eastern (EST))
  - Summer (DST): UTC-4 (EDT)

Callen Point is a promontory in Yarmouth, Maine, United States. It is located 2.2 miles (3.5 km) east-southeast of Yarmouth Village, on the southern banks of the Royal River, east of Larrabee's Landing and near the river's confluence with Casco Bay.

It was an important defensive point during King Philip's War and King William's War of the 17th century.

Its name is believed to derive from Calling Point, due to locals calling across to the garrison for assistance. It is named Cuttinge Pinte in the York County deeds.

== Walter Gendall ==
It was shortly after the outbreak of King William's War (also known as the Second Indian War) that Captain Walter Gendall, "hero of ancient Westcustogo", was killed near Callen Point by Native Americans while taking supplies to his troops, who were building a fort beside the point. Gendall had mistaken the cessation of the Indians' gunfire to mean that they were out of ammunition, and he set out to cross the river from the northern side. He made the journey without incident, but was shot upon reaching the opposite shoreline. His last words were: "I have lost my life in your service."

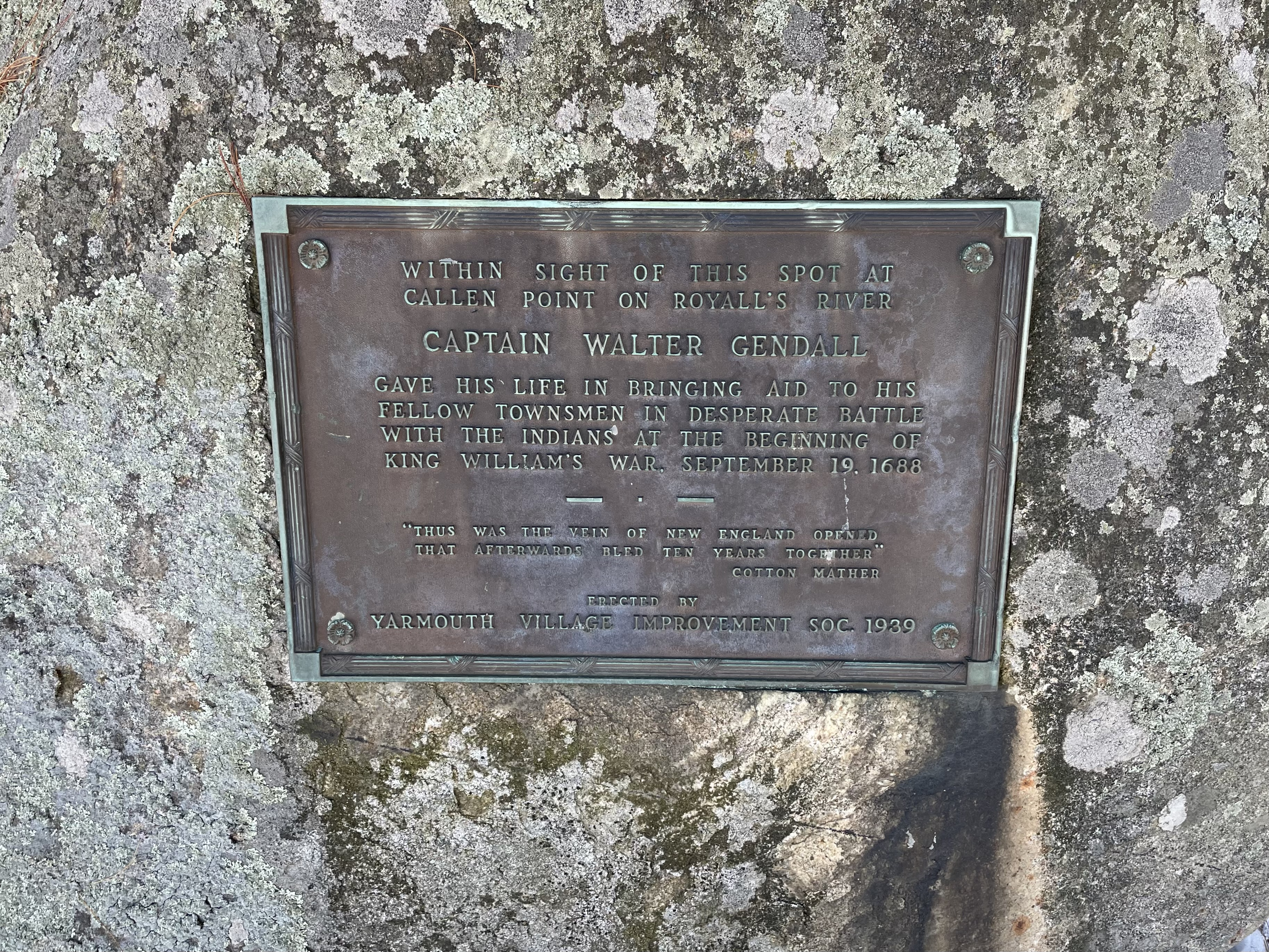
Walter Gendall memorial plaque, which contains a quote from Cotton Mather

A man named Harris was taken, by his hair, by two Indians to the "creek below Callen Point." When one of his captors let go of his hold to fire upon their enemies, Harris escaped after a gun aimed at him misfired.

A stone marker honoring Gendall and mentioning Callen Point stands to the north of 28 Lafayette Street in the area of Yarmouth from which he departed on his fateful crossing. It was installed by Yarmouth's Village Improvement Society.
