= John Cousins =

- Born: 1596; Marlborough, Wiltshire, England
- Died: June 26, 1682 (aged 87); York, Massachusetts Bay Colony
- Spouse: Mary Cousins

John Cousins (1596–1682) was a 17th-century English emigrant to the New England Colonies. Cousins River, Cousins Island and Littlejohn Island in what was then North Yarmouth, Massachusetts Bay Colony (now Yarmouth, Maine), are named for him.

== Arrival in the Thirteen Colonies ==
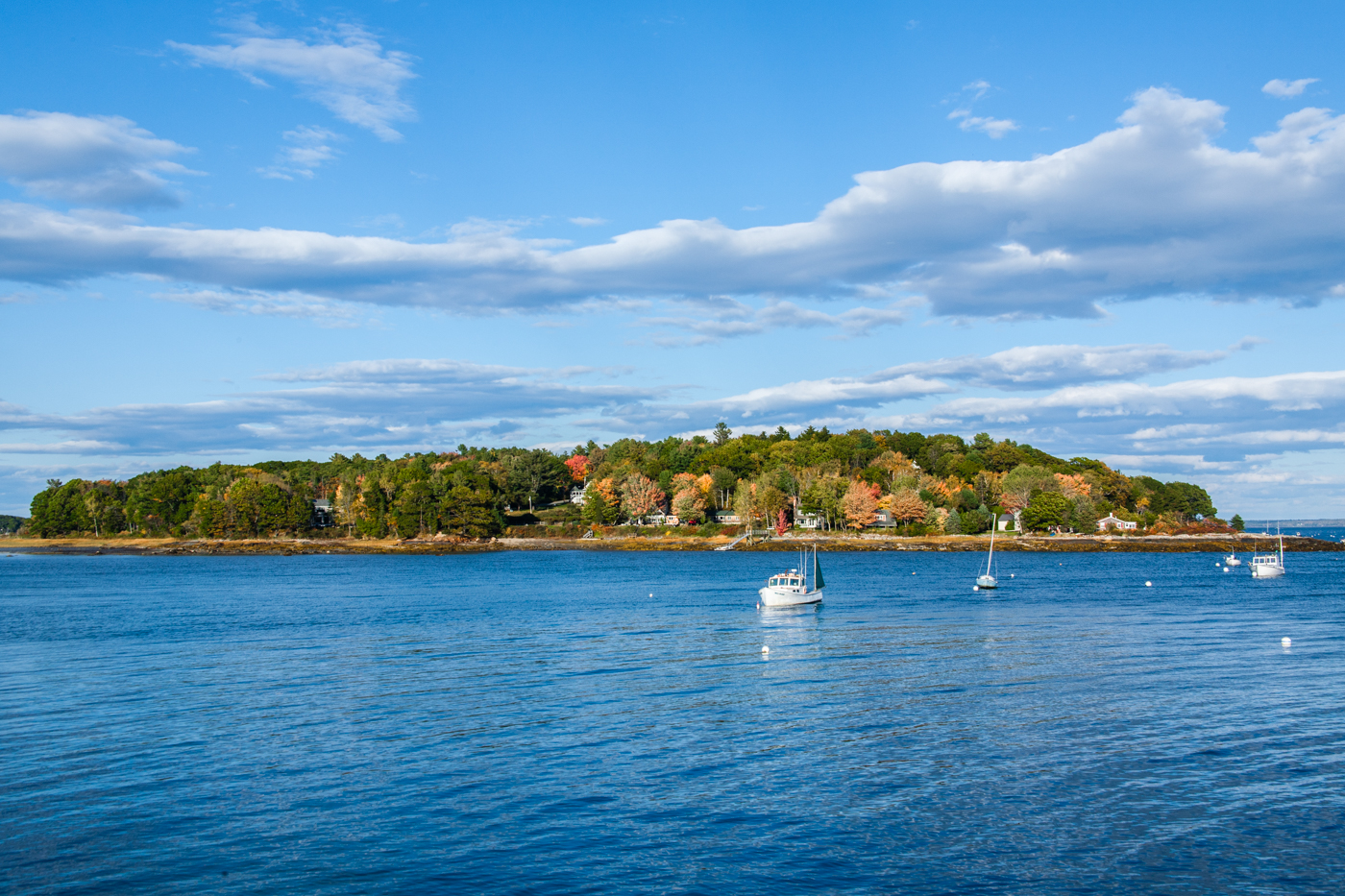
Littlejohn Island

After living firstly in Falmouth, Massachusetts Bay Colony, between 1626 and around 1635, he moved ten miles north to North Yarmouth a year or so before the arrival of his compatriot William Royall (c. 1595–1676), living on a neck of land between branches of the Cousins River. He is regarded as second only to Royall in importance as a pioneer in the area.

In 1645, he purchased from Richard Vines, Steward General and councillor for Sir Ferdinando Gorges, what became known as Cousins Island and Littlejohn Island, at the mouth of the Yarmouth River. The two islands were collectively known as the Hogg Islands at the time of Cousin's inhabitance. In 1647, he sold approximately half of Cousins Island to Richard Bray, who settled there with William Wise.

Conflicts forged by King Philip's War caused Cousins to abandon his Westcustogo home of over thirty years and move south. He was injured, and went to York to receive treatment.

== Personal life ==
Cousins was married to Mary, with whom he emigrated from England. Their son, Isaac (c. 1613–1702), followed them in 1647, aged about 34, arriving with his new wife, Elizabeth (c. 1625–1656). A year after Elizabeth's death at the age of around 31, Isaac remarried, to Ann Hunt. Ann died in 1660, aged about 45, after three years of marriage. Isaac married a third time, seventeen years later, to Martha Priest. Another possible son of Cousins may have been named Thomas. Thomas was living in Wells, Massachusetts Bay Colony, prior to 1670. Cousins's daughter, Mary, married Henry Sayward.

== Death ==
Cousins died in Cider Hill, near York, on June 26, 1682, aged 87. He deeded his real estate in Casco Bay to his wife.
