= Cousins River =

Coordinates: 43.79564°N 70.14255°W

Cousins River Sisquisic (Native American)
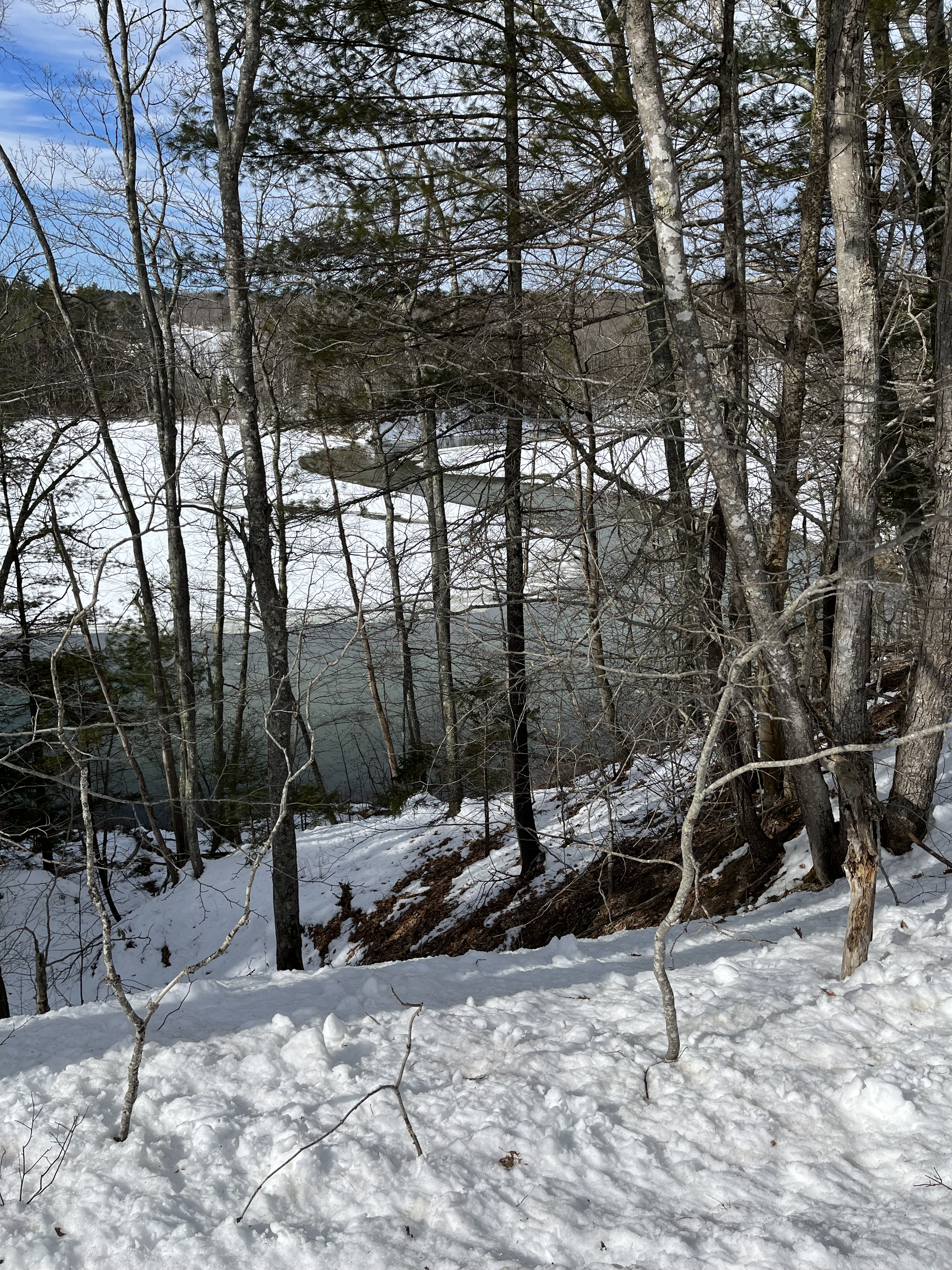
- The river below Granite Street in Yarmouth, near its confluence with the Royal River

Location
- Country: United States

Physical characteristics
- Source
  - location: Maine

The Cousins River (Native American: Sisquisic) is a 4.7-mile-long (7.6 km), primarily tidal river in southern Maine. Rising in the town of Freeport at the junction of Harvey Brook and Merrill Brook, it flows south and forms, for most of its course, the boundary between Freeport and Yarmouth. It flows into the Royal River just west of its mouth in Casco Bay.

The river, Cousins Island and Littlejohn Island are named after Englishman John Cousins (c. 1596–1682), who emigrated from Marlborough, Wiltshire.

== See also ==
- List of rivers of Maine
- Brown's Point
