= Wyman Power Station =

W. F. Wyman Station
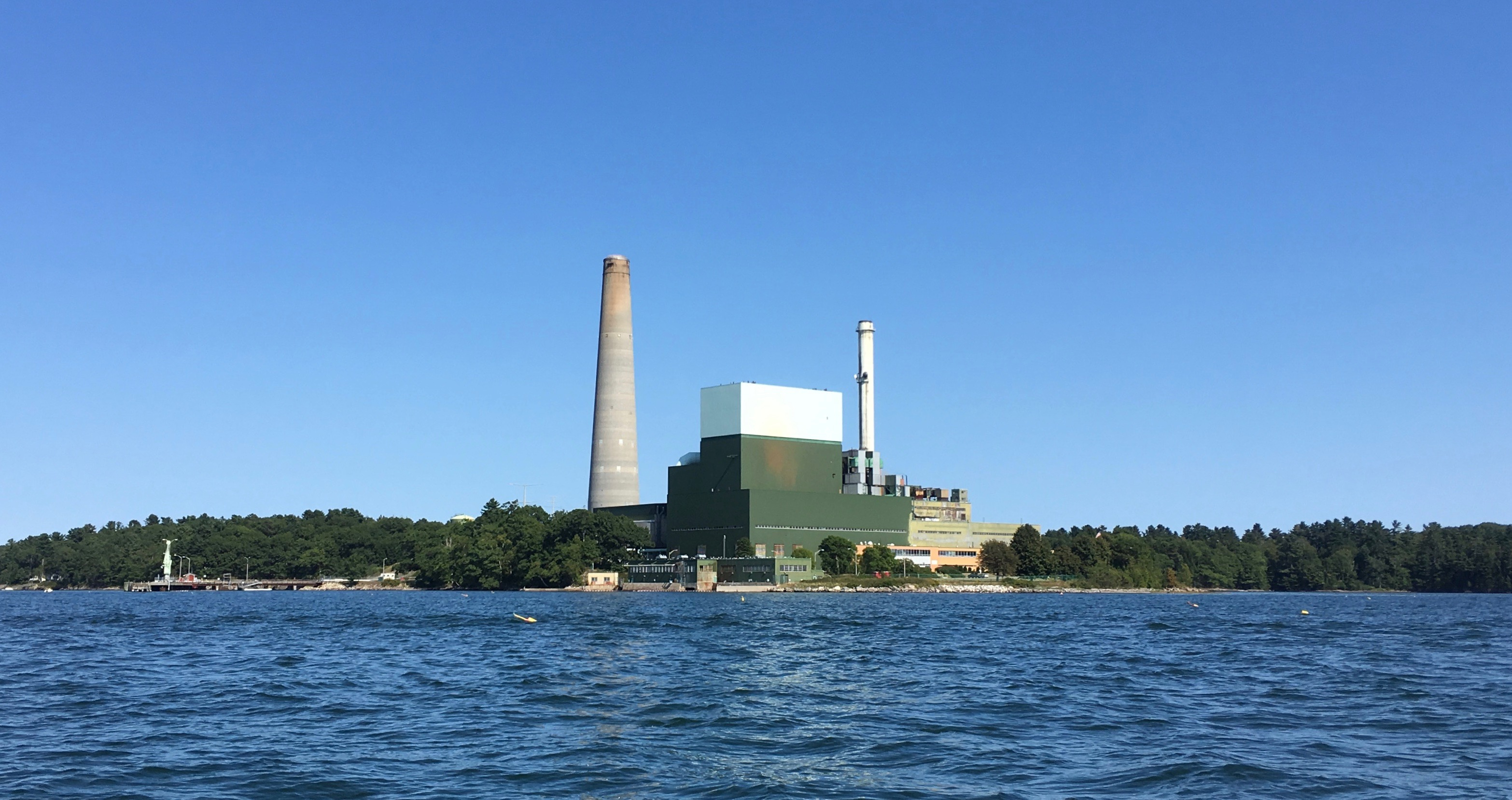
- Pictured in 2016, looking northeast
- Country: United States
- Location: Maine
- Coordinates: 43.7508°N 70.1567°W
- Construction began: 1957
- Owner: NextEra Energy
- Operator: Central Maine Power

Wyman Power Station (known colloquially as CMP) is an oil-fired power station in Yarmouth, Maine, United States. Situated on the town's Cousins Island, the facility was completed in 1957. It is named for William Frizzell Wyman, the former president of Central Maine Power (CMP) and the son of its co-founder, Walter Scott Wyman.

The facility has four steam turbine units, the most recent of which, with its 421-foot chimney, went online in 1978.

Because it burns costly Number 6 residual fuel, the plant has largely been used as a peaking power plant, fired up only when another big plant goes offline, or when very hot or cold weather spikes the region's demand for energy. With $2 million in annual revenue for the town, it is Yarmouth's largest property taxpayer. In the 1980s, it paid half of the town's tax burden; as of 2012, however, it covered less than 8%.

A 16.2 megawatt battery storage capacity was added to the station in 2016.
