= Cousins Island =

Cousins Island, Maine
- Census-designated place
- Location in Cumberland County and the state of Maine
- Coordinates: 43°45′46″N 70°08′25″W
- Country: United States
- State: Maine
- County: Cumberland
- Town: Yarmouth

Area
  - Total: 1.98 sq mi (5.14 km^{2})
  - Land: 1.06 sq mi (2.75 km^{2})
  - Water: 0.92 sq mi (2.39 km^{2})
- Elevation: 72 ft (22 m)

Population (2020)
  - Total: 528
  - Density: 497.8/sq mi (192.21/km^{2})
- Time zone: UTC-5 (Eastern (EST))
  - Summer (DST): UTC-4 (EDT)
- ZIP Code: 04096 (Yarmouth)
- Area code: 207
- FIPS code: 23-08500
- GNIS feature ID: 2583555

Cousins Island is an island in Casco Bay within the town of Yarmouth in Cumberland County, Maine, United States. It is listed as a census-designated place, with a population of 490 as of the 2010 census. The CDP is part of the Portland–South Portland–Biddeford, Maine Metropolitan Statistical Area.

== History and geography ==
The island is connected to mainland Yarmouth by the Ellis C. Snodgrass Memorial Bridge (colloquially known as the Cousins Island Bridge), built in 1955. It is also connected to Chebeague Island by a 15-minute ferry ride on the Chebeague Transportation Company's ferry, the Islander. The island's southwestern peninsula is the site of the Wyman Power Station, an oil-fired electric power plant capable of producing up to 823 megawatts of electricity. Wyman is a peaking power plant, which means it is fired up to operate only during times of high electricity demand in the region, such as hot summer days. The Wyman Energy Center also includes a lithium-ion battery grid energy storage system which was the largest and the first of its kind in New England at the time of commissioning. The battery is designed to provide ISO-New England an option for handling the continual changes in electricity supply and demand.

The island, Cousins River and Littlejohn Island (collectively known at the time as the Hogg Islands) are named after Englishman John Cousins (c. 1596–1682), who emigrated from Marlborough, Wiltshire. He became the owner of Cousins Island in 1645 after purchasing it from Richard Vines, Steward General and councillor for Sir Ferdinando Gorges. Two years later, he sold approximately half of it to Richard Bray, who settled there with William Wise.

Heritage Radio station WYAR was established in 1998 by Gary King in the basement of his Cousins Island home. King died in 2019, but the station is still on air today.

== Demographics ==
According to the United States Census Bureau, the CDP has a total area of 2.0 square miles (5.1 km^{2}), of which 1.0 square mile (2.7 km^{2}) is land and 0.93 square miles (2.4 km^{2}), or 46.51%, is water.

Historical population
Census	Pop.	Note	%±
2020	528		—
U.S. Decennial Census

== See also ==
- List of islands of Maine
- Madeleine Point
