= Camp Parapet =

- Camp Parapet Powder Magazine
- U.S. National Register of Historic Places
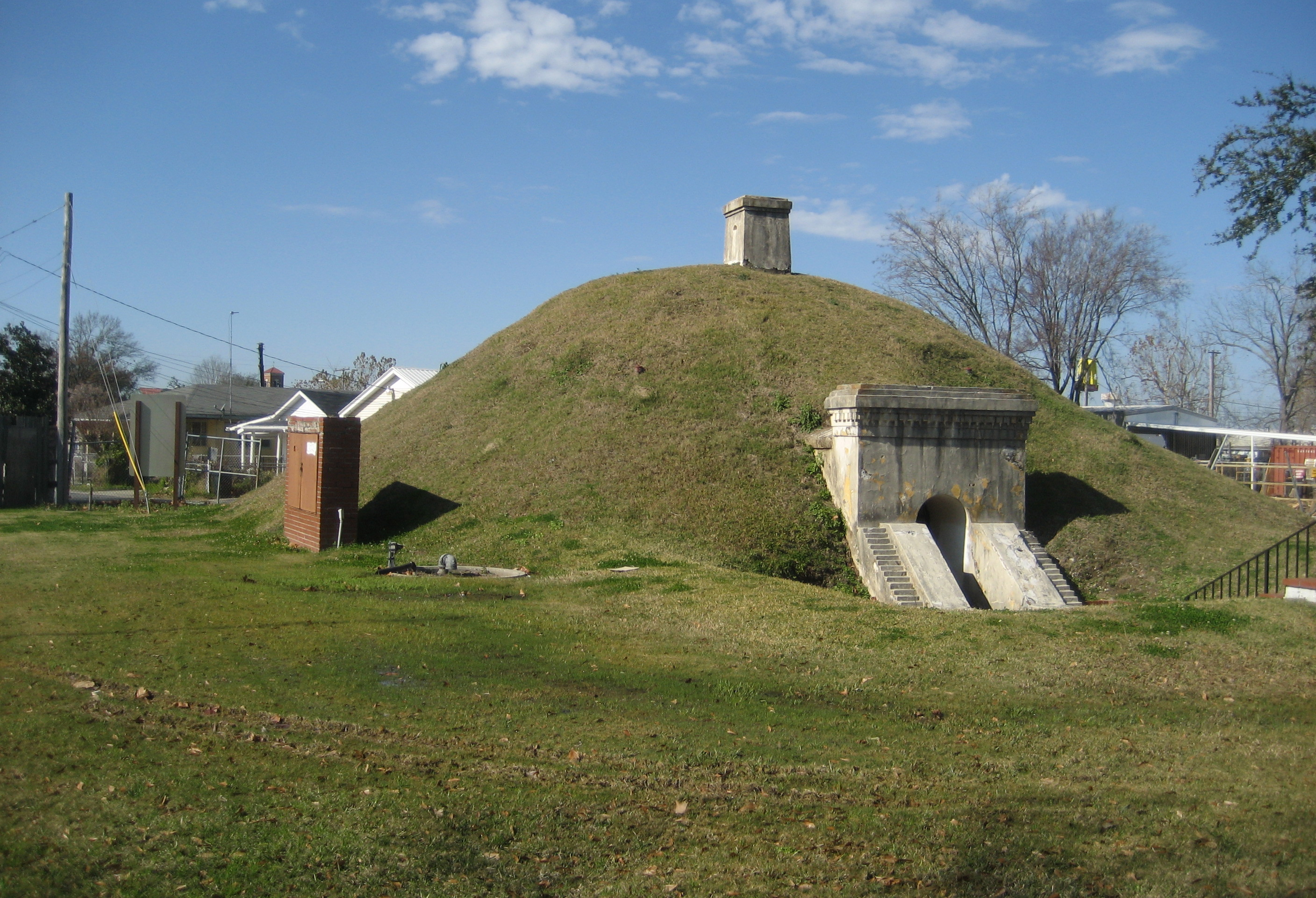
- The Camp Parapet powder magazine in 2008

- Location within Louisiana Location within the United States
- Location: 2812 Arlington Street, Jefferson, Louisiana
- Coordinates: 29°57′40″N 90°09′20″W
- Area: 0.7 acres (0.28 ha)
- Built: 1861
- Built by: Major Martin Luther Smith
- Architect: Major Benjamin Buisson
- NRHP reference No.: 77000671
- Added to NRHP: May 24, 1977

Camp Parapet was a Civil War fortification at Shrewsbury, Jefferson Parish, Louisiana, a bit more than a mile upriver from the current city limits of New Orleans.

== History ==
1863 map of Camp Parapet

The fortification consisted of a Confederate defensive line about a mile and 3/4 long stretching from the Mississippi River northward to Metairie Ridge. (The area farther north from the ridge to Lake Pontchartrain was at the time swampland.) This was intended to protect the city of New Orleans from Union attack from upriver. As the Union fleet took the city by sailing in from below, the fortification was never used. After the capture of New Orleans, U.S. forces garrisoned and expanded the fortifications to defend against a Confederate counter-attack, which never came.

Under Union control, the Camp lay in the district of Brigadier General Thomas W. Sherman. In late-September 1862, Halbert E. Paine, captain of the 4th Wisconsin Infantry Regiment, assumed command of the camp. George H. Hanks, a lieutenant in the 12th Connecticut Infantry Regiment was detailed as aide-de-camp for Sherman for the superintendence of the many contraband arriving at the camp. He organized six colonies at Camp Parapet each led by a non-commissioned officer and directed black labor in the repair and fortification of the camp and surroundings. This scheme was expanded under Hanks to become the Bureau of Negro Labor, which was one of the organizations which would eventually become the Freedmen's Bureau. Companies C and H of the 42nd Regiment Infantry Massachusetts Volunteers, serving on engineer service, were assigned to Camp Parapet on January 15, 1863 under Senior-Captain Leonard and Major D. C. Houston, chief engineer, Department of the Gulf (XIX Corps). Steps were taken in March to begin organizing and enlisting men from Camp Parapet to form the 1st Regiment Louisiana Engineers. The regiment was mustered into service April 28, 1863 and consisted of 12 companies of sixty men each in three battalions under command of Colonel Justin Hodge. Thirteen enlisted men of the 42nd Mass. Vols. were promoted to officers a month later after receiving their commissions. The 1st Regiment Louisiana Engineers would later be split in two to form the 1st and 3rd Regiment Engineers, Corps d'Afrique (95th and 97th U.S.C.T.).

== Remains ==
=== Powder magazine ===
The only remaining structure of the fortification is the powder magazine, of brick enclosed in an earth mound. It is located off Causeway Boulevard near the American Legion Post 267, preserved in a small park and added to the National Register of Historic Places on May 24, 1977.

=== Cemetery site ===
Nearby is the historic Shrewsbury (Camp Parapet) Cemetery, the site of the camp's cemetery, where 7,000 Union bodies were once interred before being moved to Chalmette National Cemetery.

== See also ==
- National Register of Historic Places listings in Jefferson Parish, Louisiana
- New Orleans in the American Civil War
