= George Hanks =

George Hanks may refer to:

- George C. Hanks Jr. (born 1964), United States District Judge
- George H. Hanks (1829–1871), abolitionist and civil rights activist
