= White slave propaganda =

American abolitionist propaganda using white-looking slaves

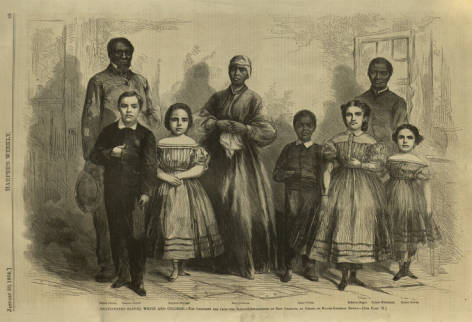
A woodcut (based on a photograph) that was published in Harper's Weekly on 30 January 1864 with the caption, "Emancipated Slaves, White and Colored."

White slave propaganda was a kind of publicity, especially photograph and woodcuts, and also novels, articles, and popular lectures, about enslaved people who were biracial or white in appearance. Their examples were used during and prior to the American Civil War to further the abolitionist cause and to raise money for the education of former enslaved people.

Children of enslaved mothers were born enslaved, regardless of the status or race of the father. The images included children with predominantly European features photographed alongside dark-skinned enslaved adults with typically African features. All these people, including the seemingly white children, were classified as black under the one-drop rule, as they had both black and white ancestry. It was intended to shock the viewing audiences with a reminder that enslaved people shared their humanity, and evidence that enslaved people did not belong in the category of the "Other".

== Historical background ==
Sexual exploitation of enslaved people by their masters, masters' sons, overseers, or other powerful white men was common in the United States. By the 1860 Census, mixed-race enslaved people constituted about 10% of the 4 million enslaved people enumerated; they were more numerous in the Upper South. Slavery had existed for a longer time there, and in the generally smaller holdings, enslaved people had lived more closely with white workers and masters, leading to more contact between the groups. The scale of the sexual exploitation is suggested by research that show the DNA of contemporary African Americans is, on average, 24% European in origin.

An analysis of the WPA Slave Narrative Collection, collected in the 1930s, shows that, when women discussed parentage at all, about one-third of these formerly enslaved women said they had given birth to a child with a white father, or were themselves the child of a white father. The plight of these mixed-race slaves, especially as children, was often publicized as a way to further the abolitionist cause.

Some pro-slavery activists wanted slavery legalized nationwide, overruling state prohibitions. They suggested there was no reason why slavery should be limited to Black people. They said that Northern white laborers would actually have better lives as slaves.

== Abolitionist use of "white slaves" ==
=== Fiction ===
The first abolitionist novel, The Slave: or Memoirs of Archy Moore, published in 1836 by historian Richard Hildreth, features an enslaved mixed-race hero, son of a white planter and an enslaved mother, who is herself the daughter of a white planter. He can state that "both on the father's and the mother's side, I had running in my veins, the best blood of Virginia". When he and his sister decide to escape, they have no problems "in passing ourselves as white citizens." The title of the 1852 edition refers to the appearance of the hero: The White Slave; or, Memoirs of a Fugitive.

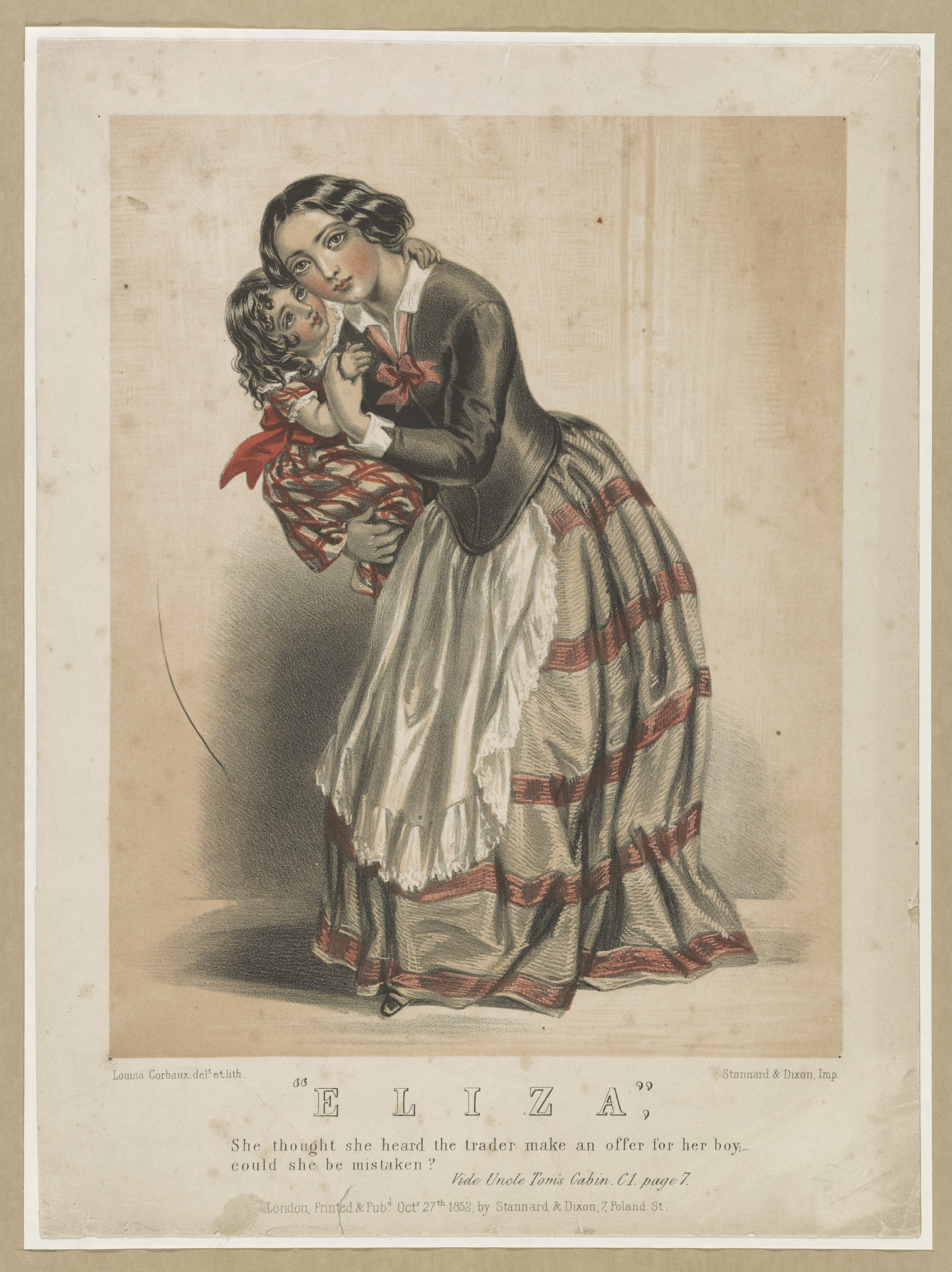
Eliza and her boy in an 1853 illustration to Uncle Tom's Cabin

The character of Eliza in the 1852 novel Uncle Tom's Cabin was described as a quadroon slave (one-quarter black ancestry), whose child also appeared to be "all-but-white".

Another popular abolitionist novel of the time was Mary Hayden Pike's Ida May: a Story of Things Actual and Possible (1854), a story about a "white" slave. In 1855, Mary Mildred Botts, a young mixed-race slave who appeared white, gained freedom after her father got financial support from abolitionists to purchase her freedom as well as that of his wife and two other children. Among those who helped was US Senator Charles Sumner of Massachusetts. She was considered the embodiment of Ida May. Articles were published about her in the Boston Telegraph and the New York Times, and copies of her photograph were widely publicized. Botts accompanied Sumner and other abolitionists on stage; she sat with them while they lectured, and was described as a former slave. On May 19 and 20, 1856, Sumner spoke in the Senate, comparing Southern political positions to the sexual exploitation of slaves then taking place in the South. Two days later Sumner was beaten almost to death on the floor of the Senate in the Capitol by Representative Preston Brooks from South Carolina.

Three decades after the Emancipation Proclamation, Frances Harper's 1892 novel Iola Leroy, or Shadows Uplifted tells the story of a "colored" family before and after emancipation. With the exception of Iola's grandmother, who is "unmistakably colored", all members of the family have so much European ancestry that they can easily pass for white. When Iola's uncle, Robert Johnson, escapes from slavery and distinguishes himself in the Union army, a white officer compares him to the other former slaves among his soldiers: "You do not look like them, you do not talk like them. It is a burning shame to have held such a man as you in slavery." Johnson answers: "I don't think it was any worse to have held me in slavery than the blackest man in the South."

=== Nonfiction ===
Nonfiction accounts written by escaped mixed-race slaves who used their European appearance to "pass for white" and gain freedom include Ellen Craft: Running a Thousand Miles for Freedom (coauthored with her husband William). With majority-white ancestry, Craft often also appeared as a speaker on the abolitionist lecture circuit.

The Crafts and other abolitionists also publicized the life of Salomé Müller, a German immigrant orphaned as an infant soon after arrival in New Orleans. Though Muller (later known as Sally Miller) was completely of European descent, she was enslaved as an infant, and was assumed to be a mixed-race slave. The threat of white girls being seized and thrown into slavery prompted Parker Pillsbury to write to William Lloyd Garrison: "A white skin is no security whatsoever. I should no more dare to send white children out to play alone, especially at night...than I should dare send them into a forest of tigers and hyenas."

Fannie Virginia Casseopia Lawrence was a young white slave freed in early 1863. She was adopted by Catherine S. Lawrence of New York and baptized by Henry Ward Beecher at the Plymouth Congregational Church in Brooklyn, New York. Carte de visite photographs of her were also sold to raise money for the abolitionist cause.

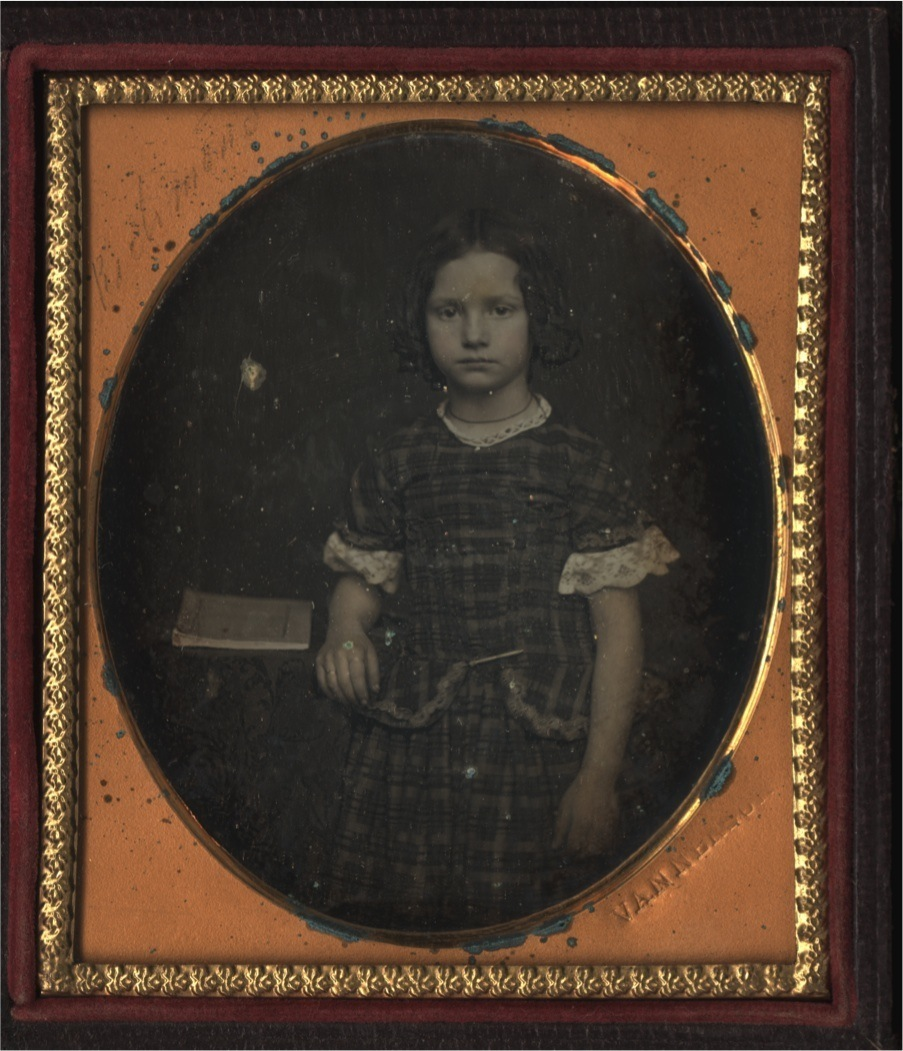
Mary Mildred Botts/Williams in an 1855 daguerreotype

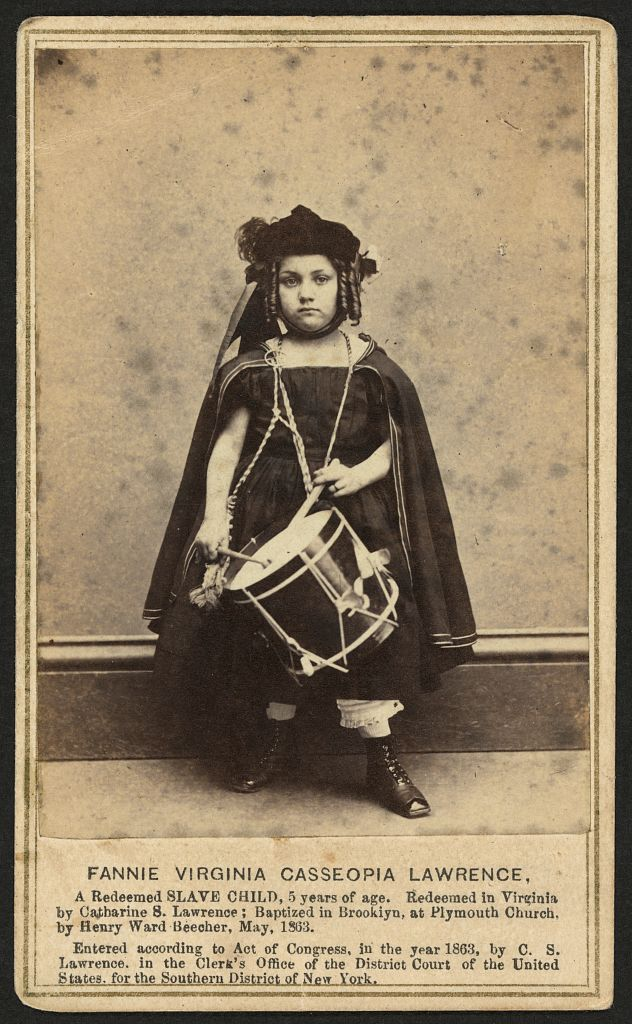
Fannie Virginia Casseopia Lawrence, a slave freed in early 1863

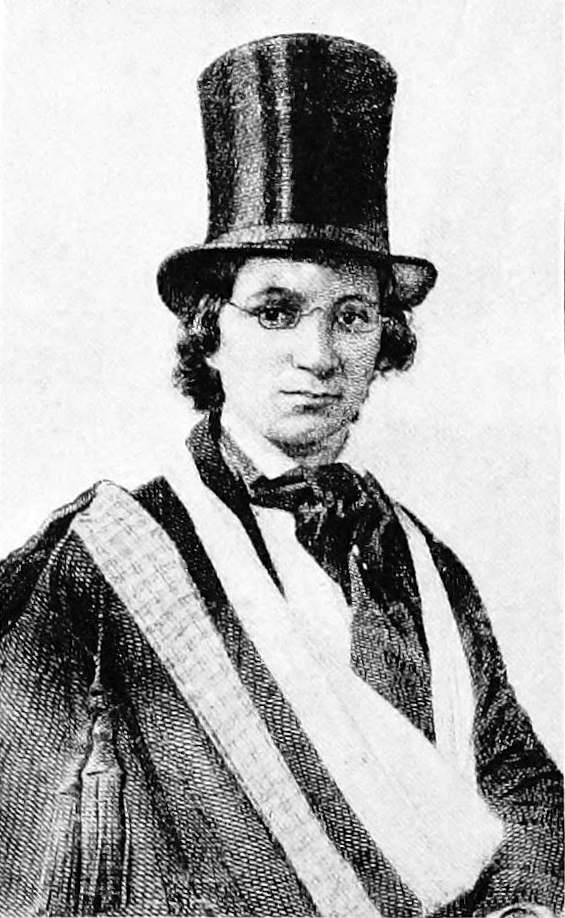
Etching of Ellen Craft, based on a c. 1860 photo

=== A special case: Freed slaves from Louisiana ===
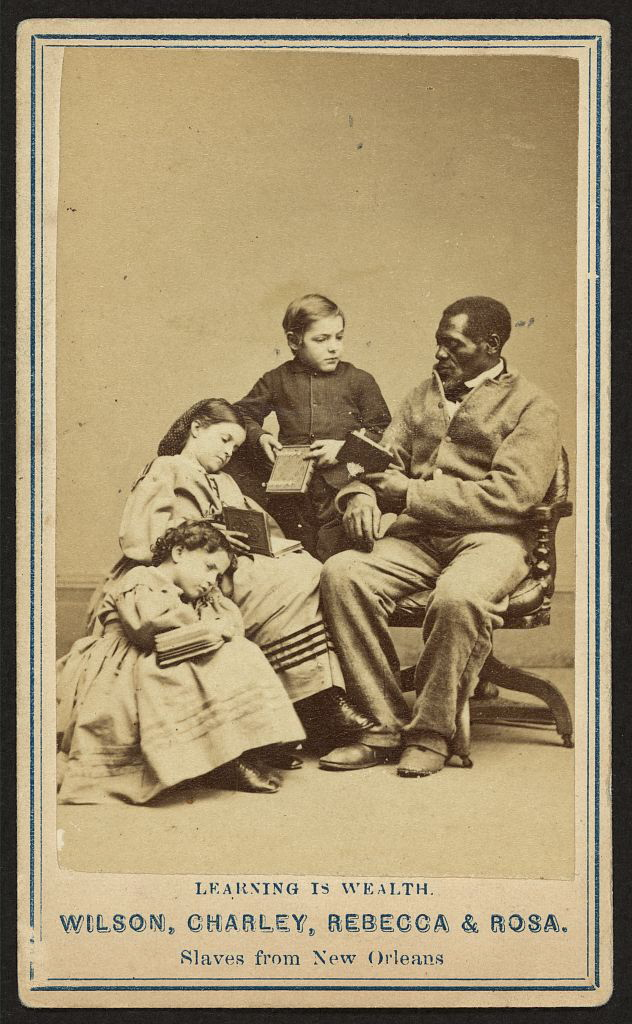
Four former slaves - three children and Wilson Chinn, an adult man, all with books in their hands; the image is entitled "Learning is Wealth"

By 1863 in Louisiana, ninety-five schools for freedmen, serving 9,500 students, were active in areas controlled by the Union Army. Funding was needed to continue to run the schools. The National Freedman's Association, the American Missionary Association, and Union officers launched a publicity campaign to raise money by selling carte de visite (CDV) photographs of eight former slaves, five children and three adults. The former slaves were accompanied on a tour of Philadelphia and New York by Colonel George H. Hanks. A woodcut, based on a photograph of the former slaves, appeared in Harper's Weekly in January 1864 with the caption "EMANCIPATED SLAVES, WHITE AND COLORED." Four of the children were predominantly white in appearance, although born into slavery.

The former slaves traveled from New Orleans to the North. Of these, four children appeared to be white or octoroon. According to the Harper's Weekly article, they were, "'perfectly white;' 'very fair;' 'of unmixed white race.' Their light complexions contrasted sharply with those of the three adults, Wilson, Mary, and Robert; and that of the fifth child, Isaac—'a black boy of eight years; but none the less intelligent than his whiter companions.'"

The group was accompanied by Colonel Hanks from the 18th Infantry Regiment. They posed for photos in New York City and in Philadelphia. The resulting images were produced in the carte de visite format and were sold for twenty-five cents each, with the profits of the sale being directed to Major General Nathaniel P. Banks back in Louisiana to support education of freedmen. Each of the photos noted that sale proceeds would be "devoted to the education of colored people".

Of the many prints that were commissioned, at least twenty-two remain in existence today. Most of these were produced by Charles Paxson and Myron Kimball, who took the group photo that later appeared as a woodcut in Harper's Weekly. A portrait of Rebecca was taken by James E. McClees of Philadelphia.

== Modern analysis ==
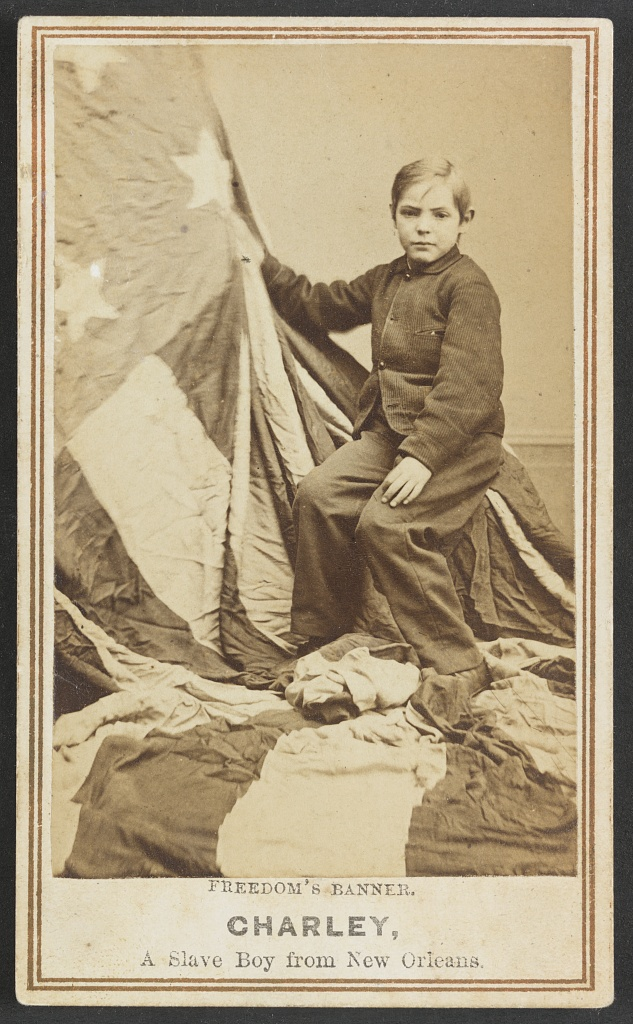
Charley Taylor holding an American flag. Charley was the son of Alexander Withers and one of Withers' slaves. Withers sold Charley to a slave dealer and he was sold again in New Orleans.

Modern scholars have examined the white slave campaign's motives and success. Mary Niall Mitchell, in "Rosebloom and Pure White, Or So It Seemed", argues that because the slaves were depicted as being white, through both their skin color and style of dress, abolitionists could argue that the Civil War was independent of class status. Supporters of the war believed that this was needed after the New York City draft riots that year. Predominantly ethnic Irish mobs had protested the draft law, as wealthier men could buy substitutes rather than serve in the war.

Carol Goodman, in "Visualizing the Color Line", has argued that the photos alluded to physical and sexual abuse of the children's mothers. When publishing the photo of the eight former slaves, the editor of Harper's Weekly wrote that slavery permits slave-holding "'gentlemen' [to] seduce [the] most friendless and defenseless of women." The specter of "white" girls being sold as "fancy girls" or concubines in Southern slave markets may have caused Northern families to fear for the safety of their own daughters. Similarly, the idea that white slave-master fathers would sell their own children in slave markets raised Northerners' concerns.

Gwendolyn DuBois Shaw, in "Portraits of a People", has argued that the usage of props, such as the American flag and books, helped to provide context for Northern viewers, and also to emphasize that the purpose of the photos was to raise money for education of formerly enslaved people by funding schools in Louisiana. She also noted that resorting to using "white" children to illustrate the damage caused by institutional slavery, whose victims were overwhelmingly visibly people of color, demonstrated the contemporary racism of both Southern and Northern societies.

== See also ==
- Garafilia Mohalbi – Greek girl rescued from slavery in the Ottoman Empire
- Irish slaves myth – False conflation of Irish indentured servitude and African chattel slavery
- Julia Chinn – Common-law wife of vice president Richard Mentor Johnson
- Louisa Picquet – American author and enslaved person
- Mary Mildred Williams – Formerly enslaved African American (c. 1847–1921)
- Passing (racial identity) – When a person classified as one race is accepted as another
- Sally Hemings – Whose children are generally regarded as having been fathered by president Thomas Jefferson
- White slavery – Enslavement of people of European descent
- Wilson Chinn – American enslaved man
