= Shrewsbury (Camp Parapet) Cemetery =

Civil War era military camp and cemetery in Louisiana

Coordinates: 29.96953°N 90.15745°W

Shrewsbury Cemetery
- Interactive map of Shrewsbury Cemetery

Details
- Location: New Orleans, Louisiana, US

Shrewsbury Cemetery, historically known as Camp Parapet Cemetery, is an old burial ground near New Orleans, Louisiana, United States. It is on the site of a Confederate military camp during the American Civil War. The cemetery is the burying ground of Ross Church and First Zion Church, both located nearby. It is also sometimes known as First Zion Cemetery.

== History ==
What is now Causeway Boulevard marks the original line of fortifications of "Fort John Hunt Morgan," a Confederate military camp named after the Kentucky Confederate general. The camp itself was at Causeway and the river. The Native Guards were among many regiments which trained at Camp Parapet and made their base there. In 1862, with the fall of New Orleans to the Union Army, the fort was occupied by Federal troops, who renamed it "Camp Parapet." Camp Parapet was a large site with a blacksmith, grocery, and chapel. Soldiers who died of illness or injury at Camp Parapet were buried in the post's cemetery.

Since the time of the Civil War, the cemetery has been used primarily by local residents.

The cemetery ground is smaller than it was originally, since some land north (lakewards) of the current plot was sold to the New Orleans Belt Railroad in the 1930s.

== Camp Parapet ==
Camp Parapet was a large contraband camp, where large numbers of former slaves sought refuge. They were hired on as laborers, assistants, and many joined the service. They were fed and housed in the camp. Many of those enslaved on the nearby plantations journeyed to Camp Parapet.

In 1867-68, the graves of Union troops were moved from civilian graveyards and those of various other camps (including Camp Parapet) to Chalmette National Cemetery. Formerly enslaved people were buried in the camp‘s cemetery.

After the war, the name Camp Parapet was applied to the neighborhood as well as Shrewsbury, Bath, and Harlem. Today all that survives of Camp Parapet is the magazine, where ammunition is stored. The magazine is located at the opposite end of the block from Ross Chapel.

== Civilian burials ==
For years common practice has been to bury Methodists in front and Baptists in the rear although, as family members often attend both churches, the practice is not strictly enforced.
