= 12th Connecticut Infantry Regiment =

- Active: November 19, 1861 - August 12, 1865
- Country: United States
- Allegiance: Union
- Branch: Infantry
- Engagements: Battle of Pattersonville (detachment); Bayou Teche Campaign; Battle of Fort Bisland; Battle of Irish Bend; Siege of Port Hudson; Battle of Brashear City; Shenandoah Valley Campaign; Battle of Fort Stevens; Third Battle of Winchester; Battle of Fisher's Hill; Battle of Cedar Creek

The 12th Connecticut Infantry Regiment was an infantry regiment that served in the Union Army during the American Civil War.

== Service ==
The 12th Connecticut Infantry Regiment was organized at Hartford, Connecticut, beginning November 19, 1861, and mustered in for a three-year enlistment on December 3, 1861.

The regiment was attached to 1st Brigade, Department of the Gulf, to October 1862. Weitzel's Reserve Brigade, Department of the Gulf, to January 1863. 2nd Brigade, 1st Division, XIX Corps, Department of the Gulf, to August 1863. 3rd Brigade, 1st Division, XIX Corps, to February 1864. 2nd Brigade, 1st Division, XIX Corps, Department of the Gulf, to July 1864, and Army of the Shenandoah, Middle Military Division, to April 1865. 2nd Brigade, 1st Provisional Division, Army of the Shenandoah, April 1865. 2nd Brigade, Dwight's Division, Department of Washington, to June 1865. District of Savannah, Department of the South, to August 1865.

The 12th Connecticut Infantry mustered out of service August 12, 1865.

== Detailed service ==
The regiment left Connecticut for Ship Island, Mississippi on February 24, 1862. They arrived there March 9. They filled duty assignments at Ship Island, Mississippi, until April 15, 1862. Operations against Fort St. Phillip and Jackson, Mississippi River, April 15–28. Occupation of New Orleans, Louisiana, May 1, the first regiment to land. Duty at Camp Parapet and Carrollton until October. Expedition to Lake Pontchartrain, Pass Manchac, and up Tchefuncta and Pearl rivers July 25-August 2. Skirmishes at Madisonville and near Covington July 27. Operations in District of La Fourche October 24-November 6. Occupation of Donaldsonville October 25. Action at Georgia Landing, near Labadieville, October 27. Duty in District of La Fourche until February 1863. Expedition to Bayou Teche January 13–15. Action with steamer Cotton January 14. Moved to Brashear City, Louisiana February and duty there until March. Operations against Port Hudson March 7–27. Pattersonville March 28 (detachment). Operations in western Louisiana April 9-May 14. Bayou Teche Campaign April 11–20. Port Bisland, near Centreville, April 12–13. Irish Bend April 14. Opelousas April 20. Expedition to Alexandria and Simsport May 5–18. Near Cheyneyville May 18. Movement to Bayou Sara, then to Port Hudson May 22–25. Siege of Port Hudson May 25-July 9. Assaults on Port Hudson May 27 and June 14. Surrender of Port Hudson July 9. Operations in western Louisiana July to September 1863. 2nd Battle of Sabine Pass September 4–11. Teche Campaign October 3-November 30. Duty at New Iberia until January 1864. Moved to New Orleans and on veteran furlough until May. Duty at Carrollton until July. Moved to Fortress Monroe, Virginia, then to Washington, D.C., July 5–13. Snicker's Gap expedition July 14–23. Philip Sheridan's Shenandoah Valley Campaign, August to December. Battle of Opequon, Winchester, September 19. Fisher's Hill September 22. Battle of Cedar Creek October 19. Duty at Winchester, Newtown, and Summit Point until April 1865. Moved to Washington, D.C., April 21, and duty there until June. Grand Review of the Armies May 23–24. Moved to Savannah, Georgia, June 1–5 and duty there until August.

== Casualties ==
The regiment lost a total of 273 men during service; 6 officers and 65 enlisted men killed or mortally wounded, 8 officers and 196 enlisted men died of disease.

== Commanders ==
- Lieutenant Colonel Frank Henry Peck – commanded at the battles of Port Hudson and Opequon; he was wounded in action at Port Hudson and mortally wounded in action at Opequon
- Lieutenant Colonel George N. Lewis – commanded at the Battle of Cedar Creek

== Notable Members ==
In late-September 1862 while stationed at Camp Parapet, a lieutenant in the 12th Connecticut, George H. Hanks, was detailed as aide-de-camp for Brigadier General Thomas W. Sherman for the superintendence of the many contraband arriving at the camp. He organized six colonies of freedmen at Camp Parapet each led by a non-commissioned officer and directed black labor in the repair and fortification of the camp and surroundings. Hanks was transferred out of the regiment January 1, 1863 and made a member of the Army officer corps. He expanded the scheme, which became the Bureau of Negro Labor, and the bureau was one of the organizations which would eventually become the Freedmen's Bureau. Hanks's assistant superintendent was another member of the regiment, Philip Bacon.

== See also ==
- Connecticut in the American Civil War
- List of Connecticut Civil War units
