= Shrewsbury, Louisiana =

Unincorporated Louisiana town

Coordinates: 29°58′16″N 90°08′32″W

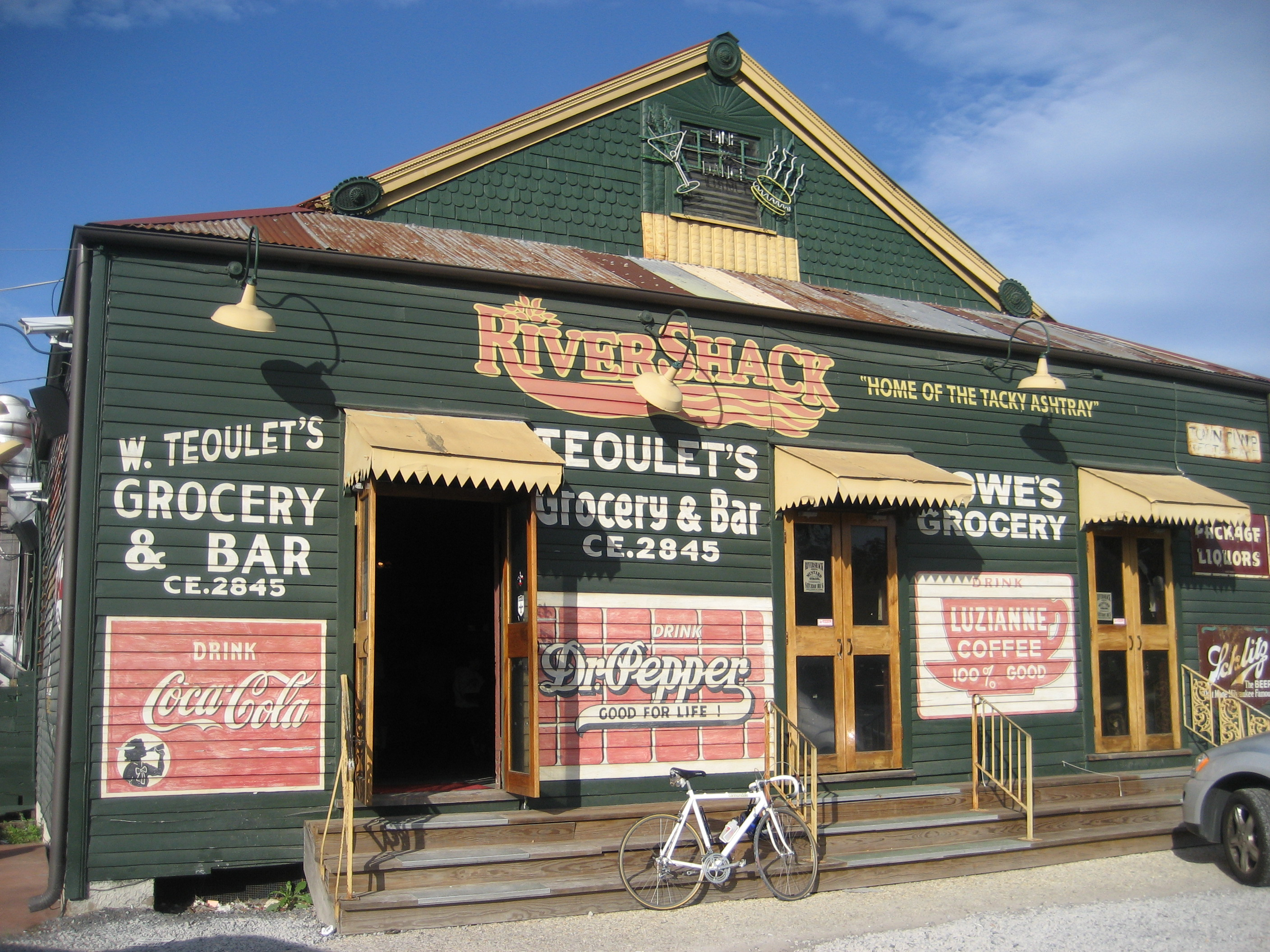
RiverShack Tavern, Shrewsbury

Shrewsbury is an unincorporated community in Jefferson Parish, Louisiana, United States, along the Mississippi River and Shrewsbury Road about 1 mile upriver from the border of the city of New Orleans. The name came into use in the mid-19th century, and became less commonly used towards the end of the 20th century, when surrounding communities of unincorporated Jefferson grew together as a suburb of New Orleans. The area is now generally known as Old Jefferson and is part of the Greater New Orleans Metropolitan area.

During the early 20th century, Shrewsbury Road was an official link in the Jefferson Highway (State Route 1, and later U.S. Route 61) and provided the main automobile route into New Orleans via Metairie Road. It faded in importance as new and more direct routes into the city were constructed, namely the extensions of Jefferson Highway (1928) and Airline Highway (1940) into South Claiborne Avenue and Tulane Avenue, respectively. The final blow came in June 1957 when the railroad crossing on Shrewsbury Road was closed following completion of the nearby Causeway Boulevard overpass, leaving the once prominent road discontinuous.

In 1915 Shrewsbury was connected to New Orleans by two streetcar lines. The first was the Orleans-Kenner interurban line (popularly known as the O-K Line), which provided service between Kenner and downtown New Orleans along the Jefferson Highway/Claiborne Avenue corridor. The second was an extension of the Napoleon Avenue streetcar line completed in 1915 with service along Metairie Road to Shrewsbury Road. The O-K Line was discontinued in 1930, and the Napoleon Avenue streetcar was cut back in 1934 and replaced by the Metairie bus line.

In 1917 the Jefferson Park Race Track was opened near the intersection of Jefferson Highway and Shrewsbury Road and was a favorite horse racing venue for many years. The site was converted into the Jefferson Park residential subdivision in 1948.

The area is also home to the Camp Parapet Powder Magazine, one of the last remnants of the American Civil War in the New Orleans area.

Shrewsbury is referred to in the rhythm and blues song Shrewsbury Blues, written by Dave Bartholomew and recorded by Tommy Ridgeley, a native of the area.
