= Alexander Scott Withers =

American historian

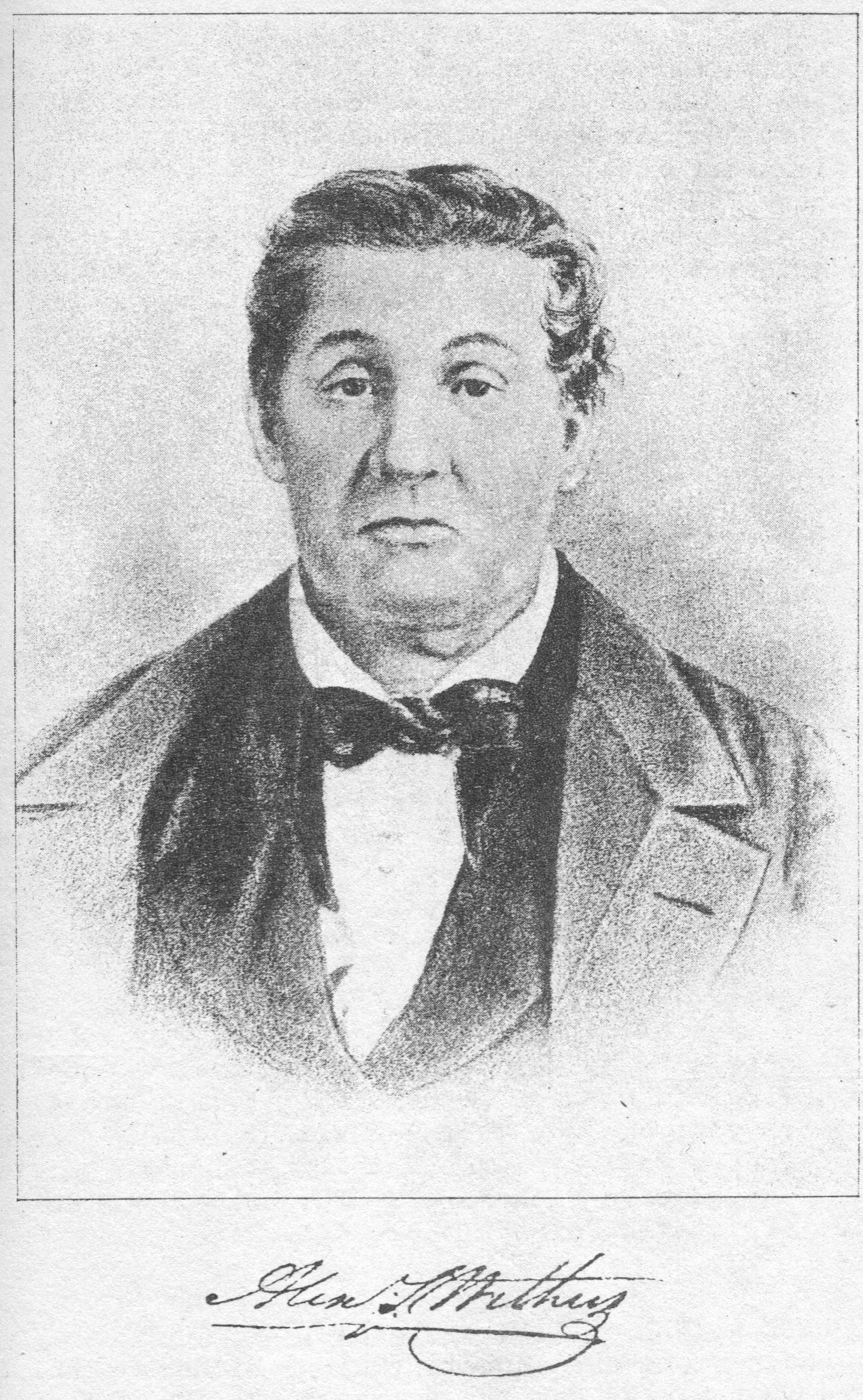
Alex^{r} S. Withers The frontispiece of the 1895 reprint of his book, depicting him at about 60 years of age (c. 1852).

Alexander Scott Withers (12 October 1792, near Warrenton, Virginia – 23 January 1865, near Parkersburg, West Virginia) was a Virginia lawyer, planter, magistrate, teacher and delegate to the First Wheeling Convention (1861) establishing the state of West Virginia. He is celebrated as the author of Chronicles of Border Warfare (1831), a history of (and important primary source on) the early white settlement of western Virginia and consequent conflicts with American Indians.

== Biography ==
=== Youth and education ===
Withers was a son of Enoch Keene Withers and Jennet Chinn Withers and was born at the family home, an estate known as "Green Meadows" about 6 miles from Warrenton, Fauquier County, Virginia. His mother was a second cousin of Sir Walter Scott. He was educated at home and in private schools, later attending Washington College and finally learning law at William and Mary, despite considerable shyness when confronted with the need for public speaking. His father died when he was 21 and he took over the management of the family plantation for a time. He married Melinda Fisher in 1815 in the Northern Neck of Virginia, and about 1827 moved his family to western Virginia, settling near Clarksburg. Subsequently, he moved to Lewis County and resided on a farm he called "Thirlestane" on the West Fork River between Weston and Jane Lew.

=== Authorship ===
Withers devoted much time to researching and writing his Chronicles of Border Warfare, or, A History of the Settlement by the Whites, of north-western Virginia: and of the Indian wars and massacres, in that section of the state; with reflections, anecdotes, &c. This 1831 account of “border wars” and local tradition in “the western country”, i.e., the northwestern portion of colonial Virginia (an area which today encompasses parts of Virginia, West Virginia, Kentucky, Ohio, and Pennsylvania), described events during the four decades between the French and Indian War (1754) and the Battle of Fallen Timbers (1794). For background material, Withers drew upon the writings of a generally reliable antiquarian, Hugh Paul Taylor (c. 1790–1831) of Covington, Virginia. In addition, he incorporated material gathered by a local judge (Edwin S. Duncan), as well as visiting with venerable local pioneers (Noah Zane, John Hacker), which required several arduous trips on horseback. (In addition, there was a claim that the work was largely written by an early settler, William Powers [1765-1855], and the son of another early settler named William Hacker [1771–1826], and only prepared for publication by Withers. But this is according to a statement made by a grandson of Powers and has never been substantiated.)

Withers's book is full of graphic accounts of massacres and reprisals. Later genealogists have appreciated the numerous references to intrepid scouts and early settlers along the frontier. Withers was somewhat dissatisfied with the final form of the published book. According to Lyman Draper, “He used to say that had he published the volume himself he would have made it much more complete, and better in many ways; for he was hampered, limited and hurried—often correcting proof of the early, while writing the later chapters.") Printed by Joseph Israel, the local Clarksburg newspaper publisher, the book brought Withers no profit, as Israel’s business soon foundered.

=== Career and later years ===
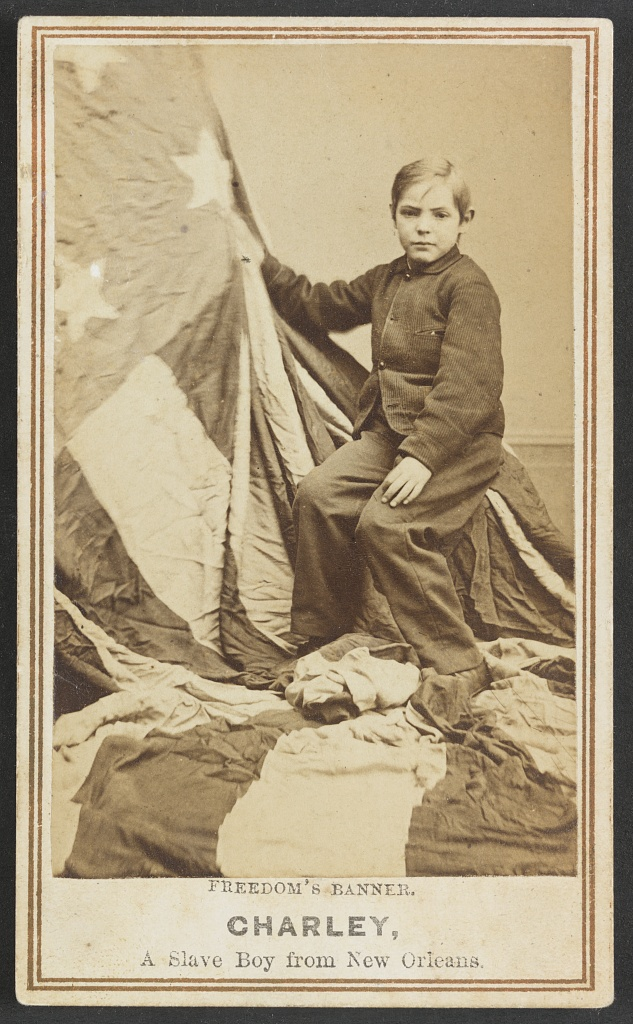
Charley Taylor holding an American flag.

Disappointed, Withers traveled to Missouri with the plan of settling and spending his remaining years there, but was likewise disappointed with that region and soon returned to Lewis County, where he again took up in farming and school teaching. In 1839, Withers taught the young General Thomas “Stonewall” Jackson in a school room in Lewis County's first court house building. Beginning in 1840, he served several years as local justice of the peace near Weston. After the death of his wife in 1853, he made his home with his eldest daughter in Parkersburg.

Withers was said to have been the largest slave-owner in Lewis County, owning ten or twelve slaves. Notwithstanding this, he was a Unionist during the Civil War and served as delegate to the First Wheeling Convention of May 1861. Withers fathered a number of children by his mulatto slave Lucy Taylor after his wife died. He subsequently sold her and at least two of the children. In an 1864 issue of Harper’s Weekly, Col. George H. Hanks published a letter and printed an engraving of a photograph that included Withers's slave son, Charley Taylor, in an effort to publicize the issue of "white slaves".

Withers lived a retired, studious life until his death in 1865 at the age of 73 and was buried in a graveyard along what is now U.S. Route 19 in Weston.

== Editions of Chronicles ==
- Withers, Alexander Scott, Chronicles of Border Warfare, or, A History of the Settlement by the Whites, of north-western Virginia: and of the Indian wars and massacres, in that section of the state; with reflections, anecdotes, &c. Clarksburg, Va.: J. Israel, 1831. (A volume of the original edition is now very rare.)
- Withers, Alexander Scott, Chronicles of Border Warfare, or a History of the Settlement by the Whites, of North-Western Virginia, and of the Indian Wars and Massacres in that section of the State; with Reflections, Anecdotes, &c., Edited and annotated by Reuben Gold Thwaites, with several notes by Lyman Copeland Draper. (Cincinnati: The Robert Clarke Company, or Steward and Kidd Publishers, 1895). Reprinted in 1961 by McClain Printing Company, Parsons, W.Va., ISBN 0-8063-4509-8.

== Legacy ==
- Withers' book inspired historian Lyman C. Draper (1815–1891) to undertake the enormous task of collecting the source material for trans-Appalachian history at the State Historical Society of Wisconsin.
- A historical marker on USR 19 at the bottom of the hill near the graveyard commemorates Withers. Several related Withers family members are also buried there.

== See also ==
- Withers (surname)
- Woapalanne
