= Thomas Green (pastor) =

American minister (1761–1814)

The Reverend Thomas Green
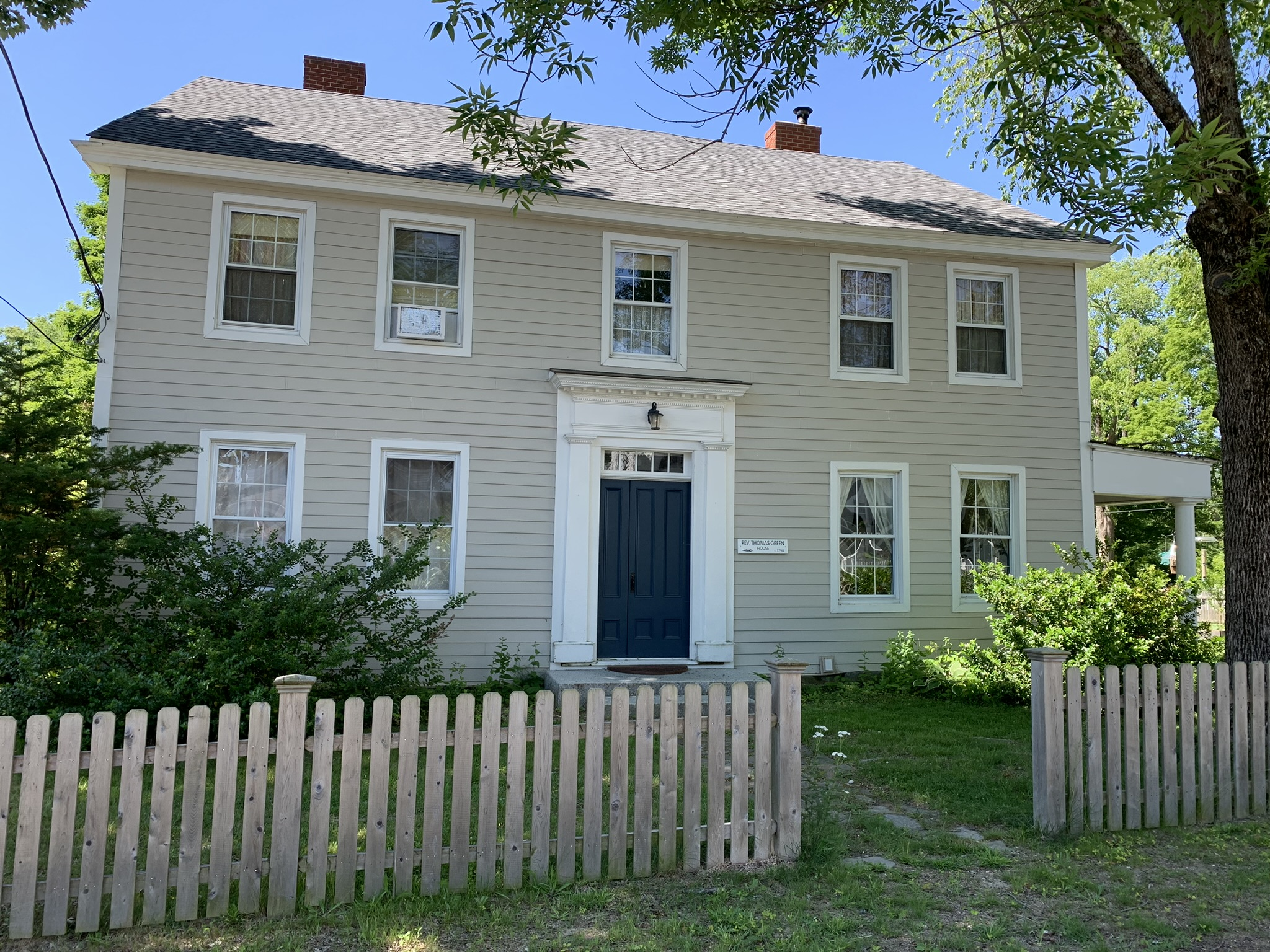
- Thomas Green House in Yarmouth, Maine, in 2022
- Born: June 3, 1761; Worcester, Province of Massachusetts Bay
- Died: May 29, 1814 (aged 52); North Yarmouth, Massachusetts
- Resting place: Old Baptist Cemetery, Yarmouth, Maine
- Occupation: Minister
- Years active: 1797–1814
- Spouse(s): Salome Barstow (1782–1799; her death); Huldah Stinson (1800–1814; his death)

Thomas Green (June 3, 1761 – May 29, 1814) was an American Baptist minister who served as the first pastor of the North Yarmouth and Freeport Baptist Meetinghouse in what was then North Yarmouth, Massachusetts (now Yarmouth, Maine).

== Life and career ==
Green was born in 1761, in Worcester, Province of Massachusetts Bay, to John Green and Mary Osgood, one of their three children. His mother died before his first birthday, and his father remarried, to Mary Ruggles, with whom he had ten more children. His paternal grandfather, Reverend Thomas Green, was the first pastor of the Greenville Baptist Church in Leicester of the same province.

He entered college around the time of the Revolutionary War which meant he did not complete his theology studies. He preached for a period in Cambridge and Danvers, Massachusetts.

On October 8, 1782, Green married Salome Barstow of Sutton, Massachusetts, with whom he had eight children: John (1783–1812), Mary Osgood (1786–1849), Rebecca Hammond (born 1788), Salome (1790–1790), Salome (1792–1792), Thomas (1793–1826), Salome Barstow (born 1796) and Elijah Dix Green (1799–1867).

On January 18, 1797, Green was one of seven members who organized the "Baptist Religious Society of North Yarmouth and Freeport". He was chosen as its pastor. He remained in the position, albeit with not the warmest of relationships with his congregation, until 1810, when he was succeeded by Reverend Sylvanus Boardman, father of missionary George Boardman.

Green received an honorary master's degree from Brown University in 1798.

His granddaughter, Mary Hayden Pike, daughter of Elijah, was born ten years after he died. She went on to become a noted author, and married U.S. congressman Frederick A. Pike.

They lived at today's number 40 Church Street, built in 1798. Melina Roberts, whose family lived in the house in the early 20th century, established the "Stroll Haunted Yarmouth" role play. David Ray portrayed Green in the 2018 event.

Salome Green died on November 29, 1799; eleven months later, on October 8, 1800, he married 27-year-old Huldah Stinson in Woolwich, Maine, with whom he had a son (Samuel, born 1802) and a daughter (Jane Robinson, born 1804).

A sermon Green gave at the Second Parish Church in Cambridge on November 17, 1783, was printed the following year.

== Death ==
Green died in 1814, aged 52. He is interred in the Old Baptist Cemetery, beside the church at which he had preached. He is buried beside his first wife.
