= Elijah Dix Green =

American merchant (1799–1867)

- Green around 1865
- Born: March 22, 1799; North Yarmouth, District of Maine, Massachusetts, United States
- Died: March 7, 1867 (aged 68); Calais, Maine, United States
- Resting place: Calais Cemetery, Calais, Maine
- Occupation: Merchant
- Spouse: Hannah Claflin Hayden (1823–1864; her death)

Elijah Dix Green (March 22, 1799 – March 7, 1867) was an American merchant, bank director and militia officer. He also founded the Second Baptist Church in Calais, Maine.

== Life and career ==
Green was born on March 22, 1799, in North Yarmouth, District of Maine, to Thomas Green, a Baptist minister, and Salome Barstow. His mother died eight months after he was born; his father died when Green was fifteen.

On November 13, 1823, he married Hannah Claflin Hayden (1804–1864), daughter of Aaron Hayden and Ruth Richards Jones. They had six children (three of whom died in infancy): Mary Hayden Pike (1824–1908), Emeline Carlton Green (1827–1829), Emma Sophia Green (1829–1851), Katherine Jewett Green (1835–1836), Sarah Brooks Green (1837–1837) and Thomas Hayden Green (1842–1862).

Around 1825, the couple built a home at 267 Main Street in Calais, Maine, after moving from Eastport, where their first child was born. Elijah was hoping to take advantage of the booming lumbering trade on the St. Croix River. His gamble paid off.

He was a founder of the Second Baptist Church in Calais in 1842; he was also a deacon there.

== Death ==
Green died on March 7, 1867, aged 68, three years after his wife. They are both interred in Calais Cemetery.
