= Wilson Chinn =

American enslaved man

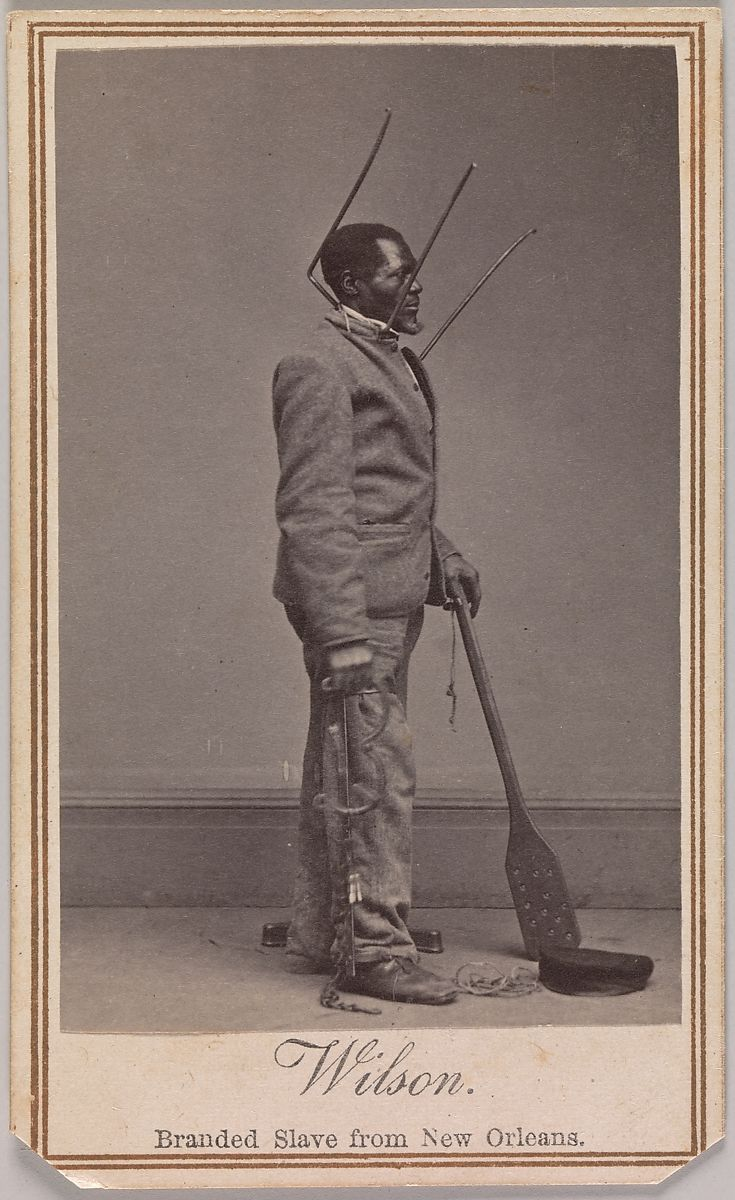
- Chinn, the famous "branded slave" photo
- Known for: Subject of photos demonstrating instruments of torture, widely circulated during the American Civil War

Wilson Chinn (fl. 1863) was an escaped African-American slave from Louisiana who became known as the subject of photographs documenting the extensive use of torture received in slavery. The "branded slave" photograph of Chinn with "VBM" (the initials of his owner, Volsey B. Marmillion) branded on his forehead, wearing a punishment collar, and posing with other equipment used to punish those enslaved, became one of the most widely circulated photos of the abolitionist movement during the American Civil War and remains one of the most famous photos of that era.

The New York Times writer Joan Paulson Gage noted in 2013 that "The images of Wilson Chinn in chains, like the one of Gordon and his scarred back, are as disturbing today as they were in 1863. They serve as two of the earliest and most dramatic examples of how the newborn medium of photography could change the course of history."

== Appearance in Harper's Weekly ==
Abolitionist, civil rights activist, and Union colonel George H. Hanks sent photographs with descriptions of emancipated child slaves and Chinn in a letter to George William Curtis, then editor of Harper's Weekly, the most widely read journal during the Civil War, which appeared in the January 1864 article "Emancipated Slaves White and Colored":

The group of emancipated slaves whose portraits I send you were brought by Colonel Hanks and Mr. Phillip Bacon from New Orleans, where they were set free by General Butler. Mr. Bacon went to New Orleans with our army, and was for eighteen months employed as Assistant-Superintendent of Freedmen, under the care of Colonel Hanks. He established the first school in Louisiana for emancipated slaves, and these children were among his pupils. He will soon return to Louisiana to resume his labor.

...

Wilson Chinn is about 60 years old. He was "raised" by Isaac Howard of Woodford Country, Kentucky. When 21 years old he was taken down the river and sold to Volsey B. Marmillion, a sugar planter about 45 miles above New Orleans. This man was accustomed to brand his negroes, and Wilson has on his forehead the letters "V.B.M." Of the 210 slaves on this plantation 105 left at one time and came into the Union camp. Thirty of them had been branded like cattle with a hot iron, four of them on the forehead, and the others on the breast or arm.

— Colonel George Hanks

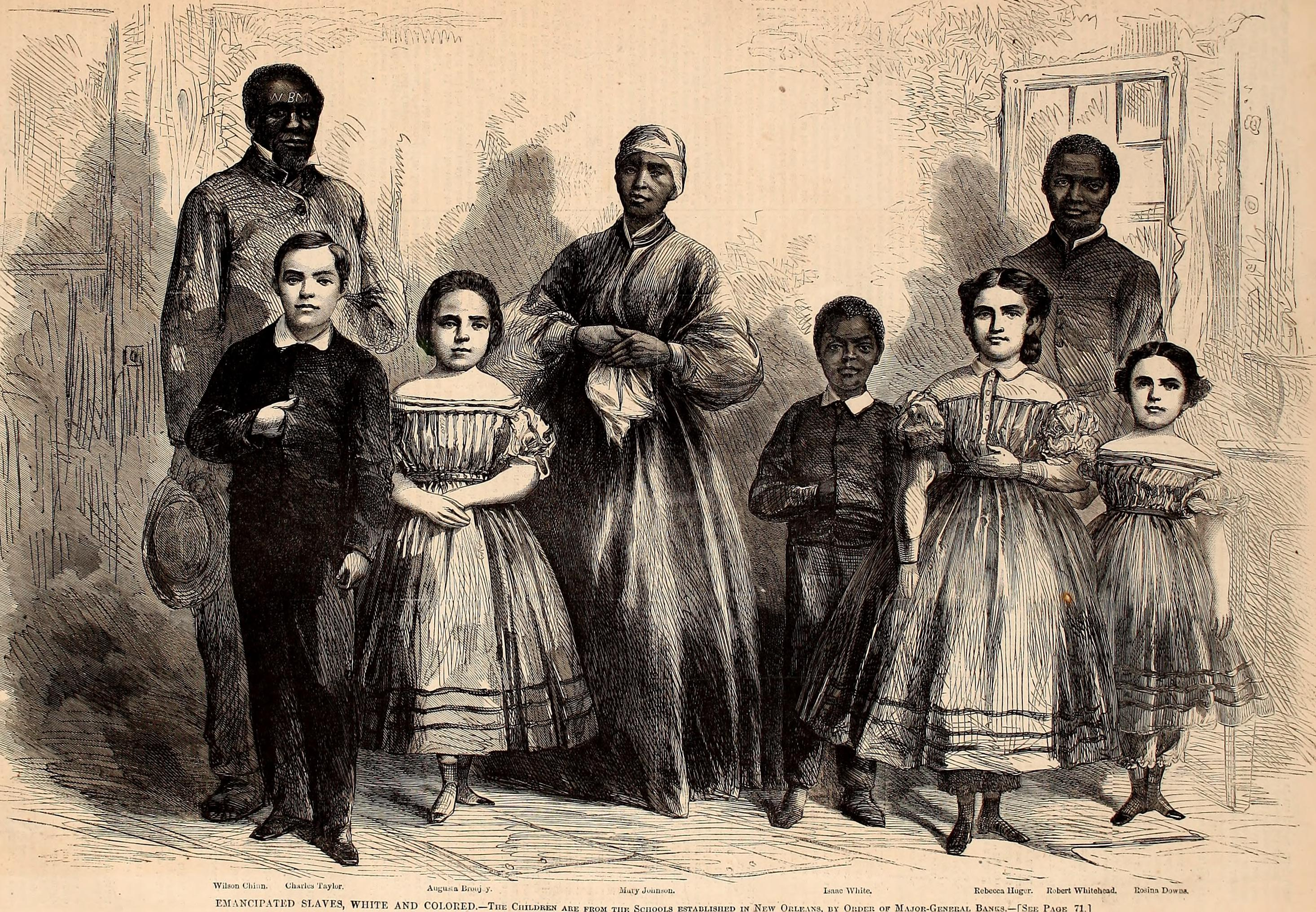
Wilson Chinn and the other former slaves he traveled with. According to the Harper's Weekly article, they were "perfectly white", "very fair", "of unmixed white race", which contrasted them with the fifth child, Isaac, "a black boy of eight years; but none the less intelligent than his whiter companions.

The former slaves, including Chinn, traveled from New Orleans to the North. The group was accompanied by Colonel Hanks from the 18th Infantry Regiment. They posed for photos in New York City and in Philadelphia. The resulting images were produced in the carte de visite format and were sold for twenty-five cents each, with the profits of the sale being directed to Major General Nathaniel P. Banks back in Louisiana to support the education of freedmen. Each of the photos noted that sale proceeds would be "devoted to the education of colored people". Most of these were produced by Charles Paxson and Myron Kimball, who took the group photo that later appeared as a woodcut in Harper's Weekly.

This helped fan the anti-slavery cause and promote the sale of abolitionist photographs.

=== Apparently white slave children ===
Of these, four children appeared to be white or octoroon. Hanks' letter in Harper's Weekly described them as "perfectly white", "very fair", "of unmixed white race", which contrasted them with the three adults, Wilson, Mary, and Robert and the fifth child, Isaac, "a black boy of eight years; but none the less intelligent than his whiter companions."

The Harper's Weekly description of them, "as white, as intelligent, as docile as most of our own children," has been identified as propaganda to win the support of Northerners.

== Modern displays of branded slave image ==
In the 21st century, the Paxson No. 8 "branded slave" image of Chinn has appeared on display at:

- The Metropolitan Museum of Art. "Photography and the American Civil War," April 2, 2013 – September 2, 2013
- Gibbes Museum of Art. "Photography and the American Civil War," September 27, 2013 – January 5, 2014
- New Orleans Museum of Art. "Photography and the American Civil War," January 31, 2014 – May 4, 2014
