= Mary Mildred Williams =

Formerly enslaved African American (c. 1847–1921)

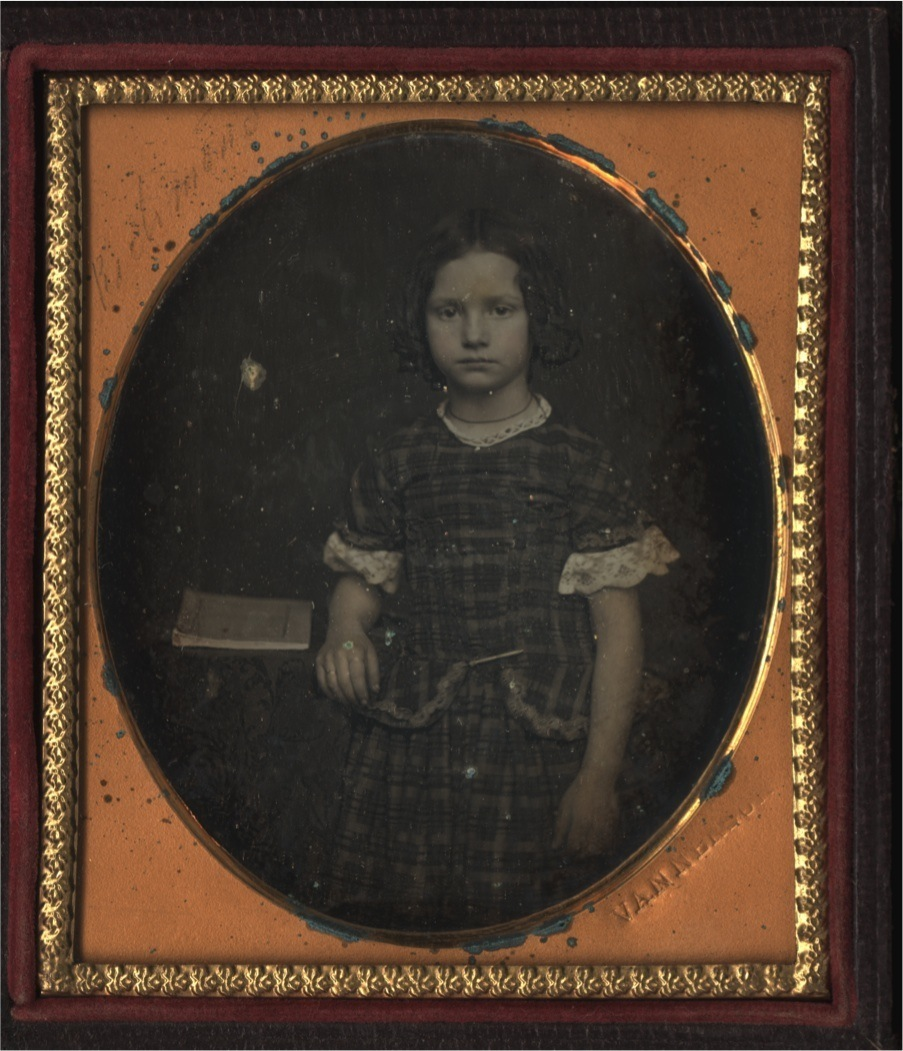
Mary Botts, daguerreotype. Julian Vannerson, c. 1855. Massachusetts Historical Society.

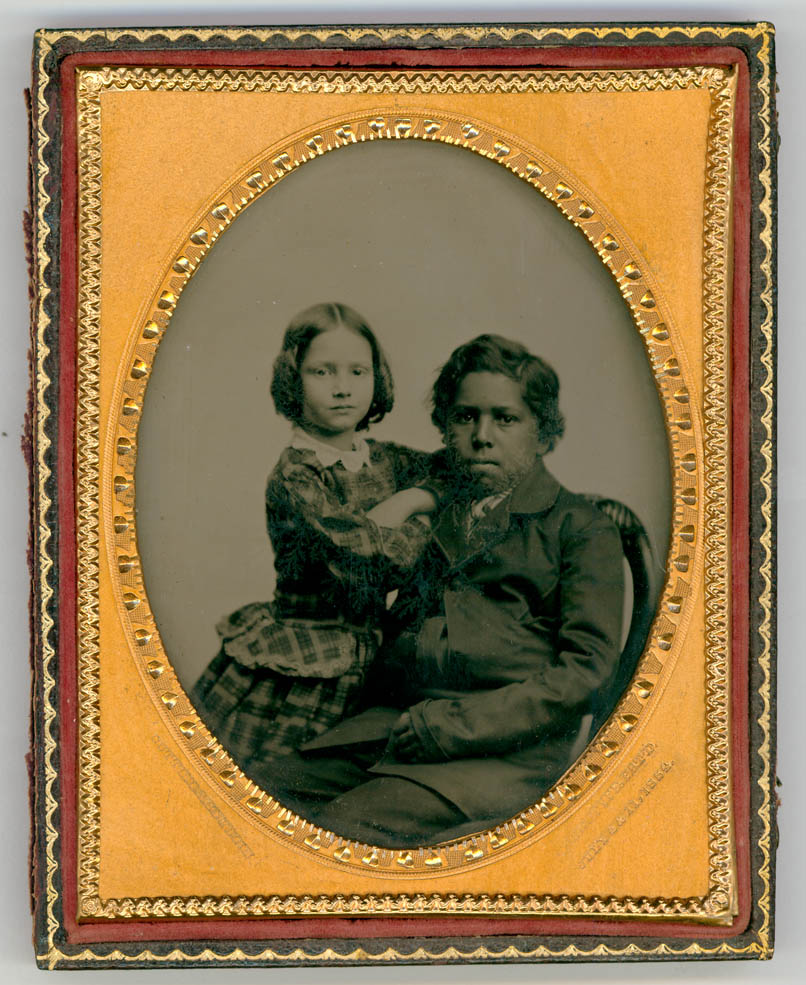
A later ambrotype, thought to be a portrait of Mary Mildred Botts/Williams and her brother, Oscar. Cutting and Bowdoin, ca. 1855–1856. Collection of Massachusetts Historical Society.

Mary Mildred Williams (born Botts, c. 1847 – 1921) was born into slavery in Virginia and became widely known as an example of a "white slave" in the years before the Civil War.

In 1855, her escaped father bought his family's freedom with financial aid from abolitionists, and she, her mother and siblings joined him in Boston, Massachusetts. After arriving in Boston at the age of seven, Williams's photograph became widely distributed, as her appearance was startling for white people who were not used to resembling slaves. She toured with abolitionist Senator Charles Sumner. He used her as an example to confront Northerners with the injustice of slavery, and to raise awareness and funds for the abolitionist cause. Williams was compared to Ida May, the main character in a popular novel of that name; she was a white girl who was kidnapped and sold into slavery.

== Early life ==
Born Mary Mildred Botts in Virginia, Williams was the second child of Seth Botts and his wife Elizabeth (née Nelson), who were both enslaved. Elizabeth had a white father. Seth and Elizabeth were married in the early 1840s. Williams had an older brother, Oscar, and a younger sister, Adelaide (also known by her middle name of Rebecca).

At the time of Mary's birth, her mother, brother, grandmother, and aunts were enslaved in Prince William County, Virginia, near the village of Washington. Her father was enslaved in neighboring Stafford County.

The maternal side of Williams' family were the subjects of protracted legal battles waged by descendants of Jesse and Constance Cornwell. Through her father, Humphrey Calvert, Constance had purchased Williams's maternal great-grandmother, Lettice (known as "Letty"), and grandmother, Prudence Bell (known as "Prucy" or "Pru"), between 1809 and 1812. According to court and census records, Williams' mother, Elizabeth, was the daughter of Prudence and a white man named Thomas Nelson, who was Cornwell's executor.

Botts was seven when she was freed in 1855 along with her mother and siblings. Her father had previously escaped for Boston in 1850, where he worked with prominent abolitionists and wealthy backers to buy the family's freedom. Through her father, Mary Mildred Williams came to the attention of abolitionist Senator Charles Sumner.

Between the 1855 Massachusetts state census and 1860 federal census, all of the Botts family members changed their surname to Williams. In the summer of 1860, Williams' older brother Oscar died from tuberculosis.

== Legal proceedings ==
When Constance Cornwell died in 1825, she willed Williams' maternal grandmother, Prudence, her two children Elizabeth (Williams' mother) and Albert, and "the increase of the females forever" to her daughter Kitty Cornwell's eldest son John Cornwell. She specified in her will that the inherited slaves (or their children) could not be sold, and if Cornwell were to try they would be freed. Because John Cornwell was not of age at the time of Constance's death, her slaves were to be retained and managed by the executor of her will, Thomas Nelson, until John turned 21 in 1830.

But Constance's will was disputed by her children, who began a legal battle in 1835. While the legal disputes continued for years, Prudence and her children remained in Nelson's possession. After Nelson died in 1845, J.C. Weedon, his qualified administrator, took possession of Prudence along with her children and grandchildren. John Cornwell instituted proceedings to recover the family from Weedon in 1847, as they had been willed to him by Constance. The case of Nelson's Adm'r v. Cornwell was decided by the Virginia Supreme Court in October 1854. It awarded all of the property to John. Cornwell was aided by Prudence's husband and Mary's father, Seth Botts, then known as Henry Williams.

== Relationship to the abolitionist movement ==
On March 1, 1855, a letter from Charles Sumner dated February 19 and addressed 'Dear Doctor' was published in the New-York Daily Times (originally published in the Boston Telegraph on February 27) that had accompanied a daguerreotype of Mary Williams.

In the letter, Sumner says:

The daguerreotype mentioned in the following letter is a portrait of one of the family referred to, a most beautiful white girl, with high forehead, straight hair, intellectual appearance, and decidedly attractive features.

In a subsequent article dated March 9, 1855, reporters of the New-York Daily Times expressed "astonishment" that the girl was "ever held a slave".

In early 1855, articles were published about Mary Williams in the Boston Telegraph and the New York Times, and copies of her photograph were widely publicized. After her photograph was published, she accompanied Senator Charles Sumner on a publicity tour to raise awareness and funds for the abolitionist cause.

The photo and tour made Williams famous. She was compared to fictional character Ida May, heroine of a popular novel about a white girl kidnapped into slavery, Ida May: a Story of Things Actual and Possible by Mary Hayden Pike (1854). A columnist in Frederick Douglass' Paper described her as:

perfectly white, and on that account produces intense excitement. We see daily white fugitives and the cupidity of a slaveholder would suffer him to keep anyone, even his mother, in slavery. When white men learn this, and that their own liberties are in danger, then they will see the reasonable-ness of an unconditional emancipation.

Abolitionists emphasized Williams's perceived whiteness to enlist sympathy, and to suggest to Northerners that any child, regardless of appearance, might be snatched and made a slave.

On May 19 and 20, 1856, Sumner spoke in the Senate comparing Southern political positions to the sexual exploitation of slaves then taking place in the South. Two days later Representative Preston Brooks (D-SC), nearly beat Sumner to death with a cane on the floor of the Senate in the Capitol.

== Adulthood and death ==
By 1865, Williams had moved to Lexington, Massachusetts, along with her parents and sister. Five years later, she was living with her mother and sister in Hyde Park, a suburb of Boston. It is unclear why her father did not join them there.

In the 1870 census, the three Williams women were classified as white. Both Williams and her mother identified as white women for the remainder of their lives. When her mother died in 1892, Williams gave her mother's maiden name as that of her white father: "Elizabeth A. (Nelson) Williams".

Williams never married nor had children. She became a clerk at Boston's Registry of Deeds, where she worked until at least 1900.

She rented an apartment in the Eleventh Ward of Boston and according to the 1900 census, she lived there with her partner, Mary Maynard. Maynard worked as a bookkeeper and probation officer. She was descended from Irish and English immigrants.

Williams died in 1921 and was buried in Boston.

== See also ==
- White slave propaganda
- Garafilia Mohalbi
