= Mary Hayden Pike =

American author (1824–1908)

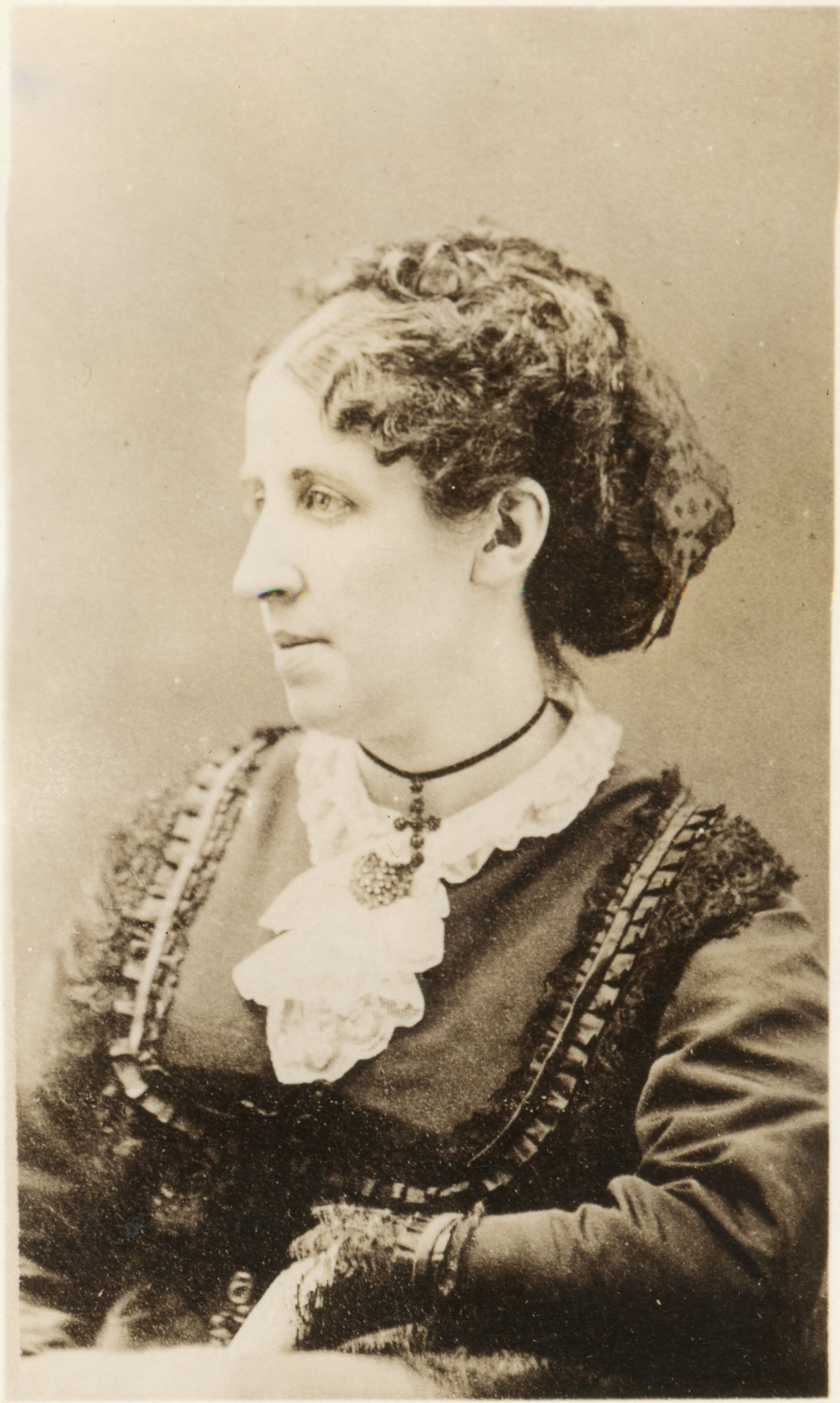
- Born: 30 November 1824; Eastport
- Died: 15 January 1908 (aged 83)
- Occupation: Writer
- Parent(s): Elijah Dix Green

Mary Hayden Pike (née Green) (November 30, 1824 – January 15, 1908) was an American author. She also wrote under the pseudonyms Mary Langdon and Sydney A. Story, Jr.

== Biography ==
She was born Mary Hayden Green in Eastport, Maine, to Elijah Dix Green and Hannah Claflin Hayden. She was educated in Calais, Maine, and acquired religious convictions at age twelve, when she went through baptism in an icy stream. She graduated from the Charlestown Female Seminary in 1843. In 1846 she married Frederick A. Pike, who was later elected to the 37th United States Congress.

Pike's paternal grandfather, Thomas Green, was the first pastor of the North Yarmouth and Freeport Baptist Meetinghouse in today's Yarmouth, Maine. He died in 1814, ten years before Pike was born.

Her most well-known writing is Ida May, a sentimental antislavery novel. The book, published in 1854, features the titular character kidnapped from Pennsylvania, her skin forcibly dyed darker, and sold into slavery. Published under the pseudonym "Mary Langdon", the book immediately drew comparisons to Uncle Tom's Cabin, including from William Cullen Bryant, who theorized the novel was really by Harriet Beecher Stowe. The book sold 60,000 copies in its first two years. Frederick Douglass' Paper heavily promoted the book and, in one review, noted it was "bound to electrify the reading public and to stir the spirits of all who have heads to think and hearts to feel". The book became popular enough in collective consciousness that abolitionist Senator Charles Sumner touted a formerly enslaved girl named Mary Botts as "another Ida May" to draw antislavery sentiment.

Pike soon followed up the success of Ida May with two other books exploring racial prejudice: Caste (1856), about a white woman who discovers she is legally black, and Agnes (1858), about Native Americans.

== Works ==
- Ida May: a Story of Things Actual and Possible, 1854 (written under the pseudonym Mary Langdon)
- Caste: A Story of Republican Equality, 1856 (written under the pseudonym Sydney A. Story, Jr.)
- Agnes, 1858 (written by the author of "Ida May")

== See also ==
- Mary Mildred Williams
