= George H. Hanks =

American abolitionist (1829–1871)

- Born: c. 1829
- Died: 23 October 1871 (aged 41–42); Fort Scott, Kansas
- Military career
- Allegiance: United States
- Branch: United States Army
- Service years: 1862-65 (U.S. Army)
- Rank: Lieutenant (U.S.); Colonel (U.S.)
- Unit: 12th Connecticut Infantry Regiment
- Conflicts: US Civil War

George H. Hanks (c. 1829 – October 23, 1871) was an abolitionist and civil rights activist and colonel in the US Civil War.

== Biography ==
Hanks was married before the war, and was a resident of Hartford, Connecticut. On January 1, 1862, Hanks joined Company H of the 12th Connecticut Volunteers. In mid-1862, the 12th Connecticut moved to the area around New Orleans, and Hanks was stationed in the garrison of Camp Parapet, about 10 miles north of the city. In late September 1862, Hanks was detailed as aide-de-camp of Brigadier General Thomas W. Sherman for the superintendence of contrabands, slaves who had escaped and joined Union lines. He organized six colonies at Camp Parapet, each led by a non-commissioned officer, and directed black workers in the repair and fortification of the camp and surroundings.

On January 1, 1863, he was officially mustered out of the 12th Connecticut and was appointed superintendent of a new agency, "The Bureau of Negro Labor". In this role, Hanks supervised labor on numerous plantations, as Union leadership wanted to produce cotton for sale and use. In the area it occupied, the Union Army in Louisiana had declared the Emancipation Proclamation and freed slaves came to its camps.

Hanks' sympathy for black individuals in the department occasionally put him at odds with department commander General Nathaniel Banks, who struggled to balance the needs of the ex-slaves with gaining support of Louisiana planters for his command. Hanks strongly advocated for opening schools for black children, and together with Thomas W. Conway, organized a system of freedman schools in New Orleans. Schools began opening in the fall of 1863. On August 27, 1863, Hanks was appointed by Major General Nathaniel Banks, along with Colonel John S. Clark and Major B. Bush Plumley, to a commission to regulate the enrollment, recruitment, employment, and education of black people in the Department of the Gulf, of which Banks was the senior commander.

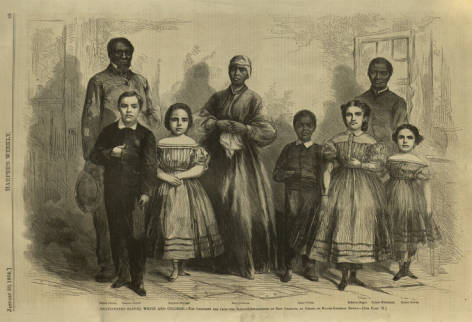
A woodcut of the slaves Hanks brought northeast that appeared in Harper's Weekly on 30 January 1864 with the caption, "Emancipated Slaves, White and Colored", based on a photograph by Myron Kimball

With the support of Major General Nathaniel Banks, in November and December 1863, Hanks embarked on a publicity campaign to eastern Union States with the goal to raise money for the education of former slaves in Louisiana. At the time, Hanks was also colonel of the 18th Infantry Regiment, Corps d'Afrique, a unit raised in Louisiana that consisted mostly of free persons of color who had formerly been in the state militia. Hanks took eight former slaves on tour with him, five of them children, and four of these appearing to be white. He took the group to photo studios to have cartes de visite printed, which he sold to raise money for schools. Myron H. Kimball took photos of the former slaves, one of which was published as a woodcut in Harper's Weekly on January 30, 1864. The American Missionary Association and the National Freedman's Relief Association both added their support and sponsorship to the tour, helping make arrangements. During his trip, Hanks visited his wife, who was living in Burlington, Connecticut. In that town, there were protests against him and his mission, which included an egging of the house where he was staying.

In April 1864, Hanks returned to New Orleans, where he was superintendent of Negro labor. One task he pursued was extending freedom to the children of emancipated slaves who were still being held by their parents' former owners. Hanks worried that Southern planters felt no loyalty to the United States and had no interest to the freedom of black people, saying that after the war, "to be left without national guarantees for the maintenance of their civil rights as freemen would be worse than slavery." In September 1864, Hanks was suspended by Banks for mismanagement, but was quickly exonerated and reinstated. Overall, he was highly respected for his effectiveness, and his work played an important role in the organization of the postwar Freedmen's Bureau.

== Postwar years ==
After the war, Hanks worked for a time as an agent of Adams Express Company. He was not successful in business. In 1871 he was living in Fort Scott, Kansas. On October 23, 1871, his wife left him due to his drinking and abuse. That day, after drinking heavily, he committed suicide by taking a lethal dose of morphine (it was available over the counter at that time).
