= Brickyard Hollow =

- Neighborhood
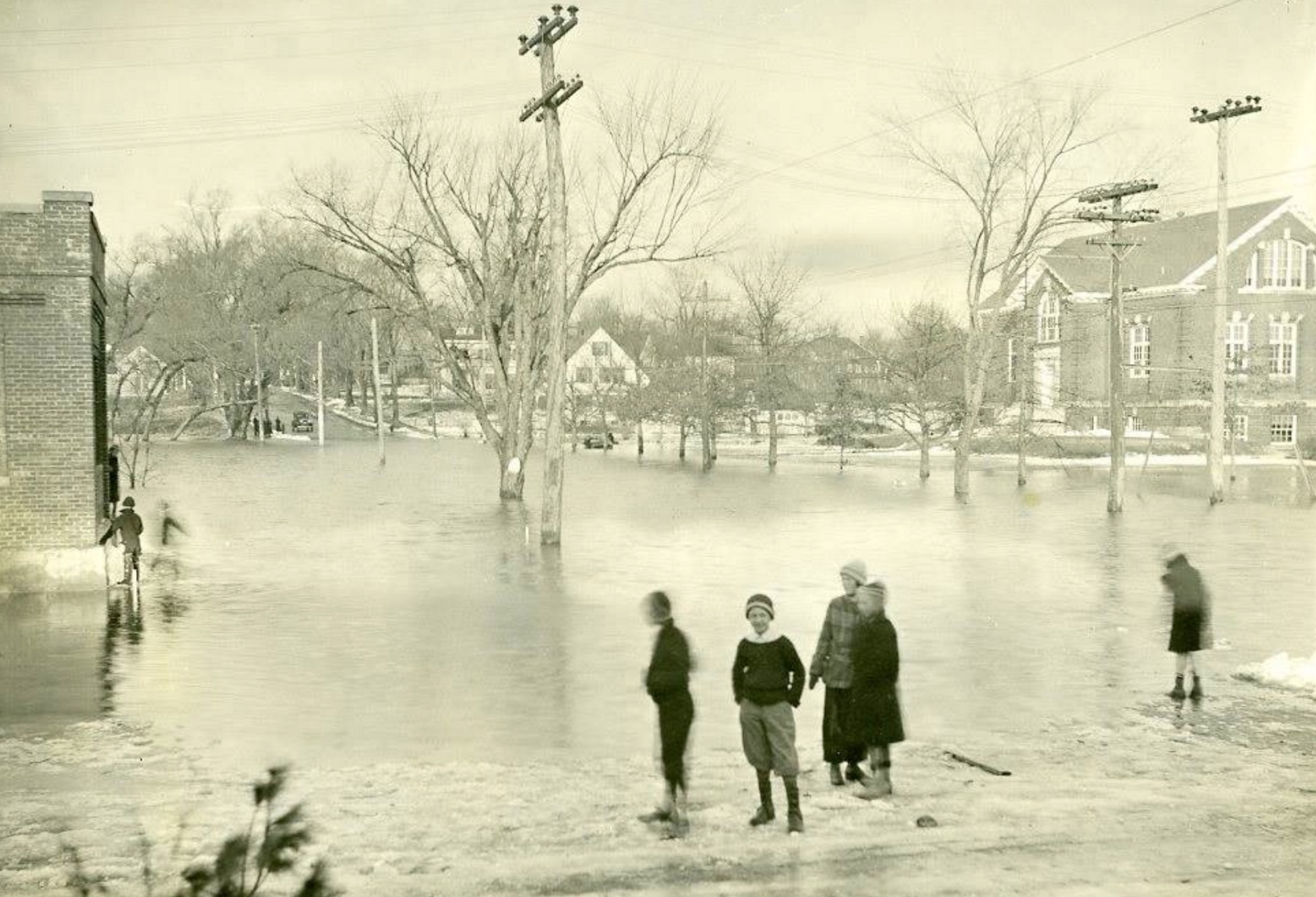
- Brickyard Hollow before it was filled in. Photo taken from where the Route 1 overpass is today, looking northwest to the School Street intersection
- Interactive map of Brickyard Hollow
- Country: United States
- State: Maine
- County: Cumberland
- Towns: Yarmouth
- Time zone: UTC-5 (Eastern (EST))
  - Summer (DST): UTC-4 (EDT)

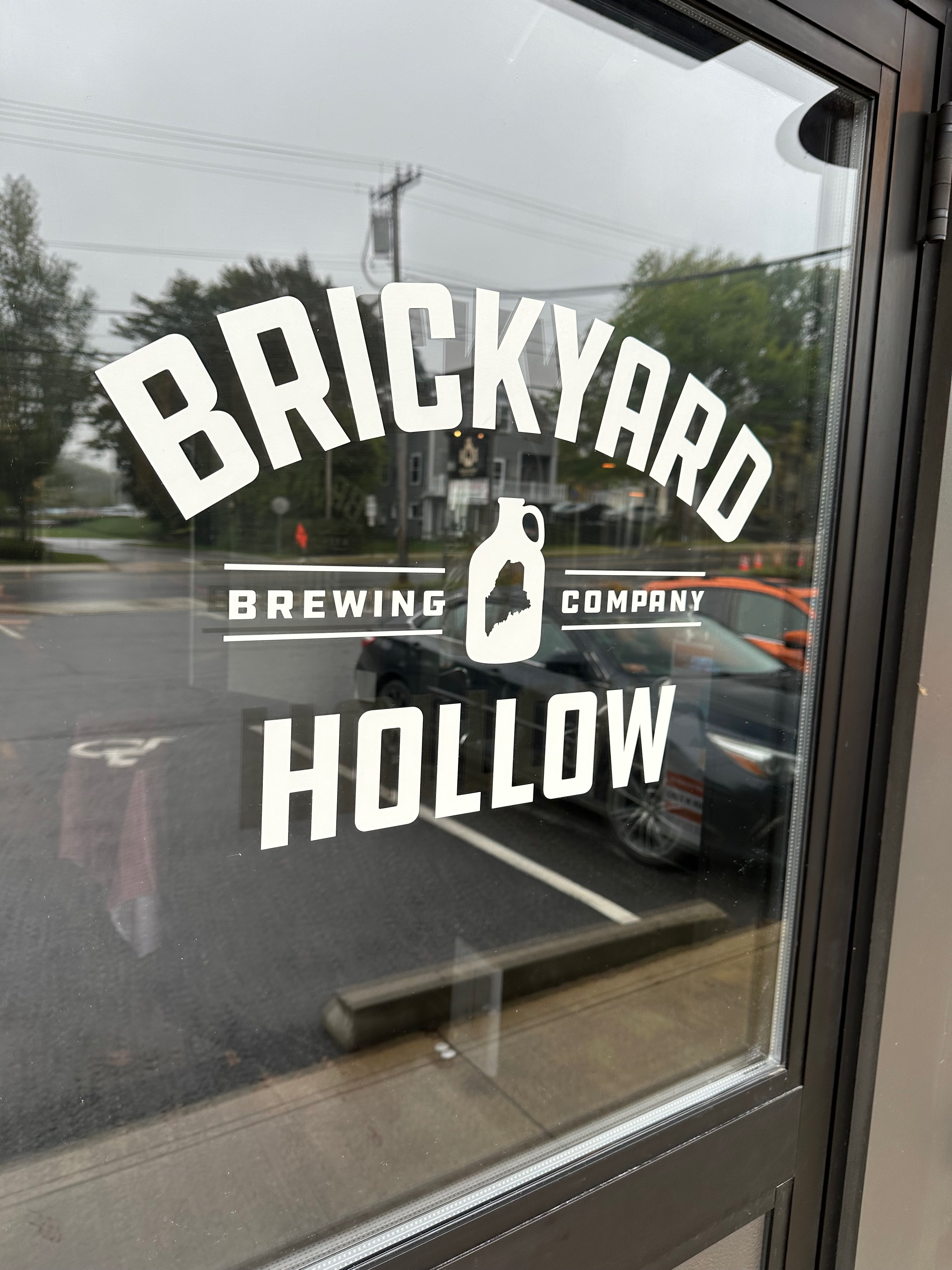
The Brickyard Hollow name is maintained in the branding of a restaurant on Main Street

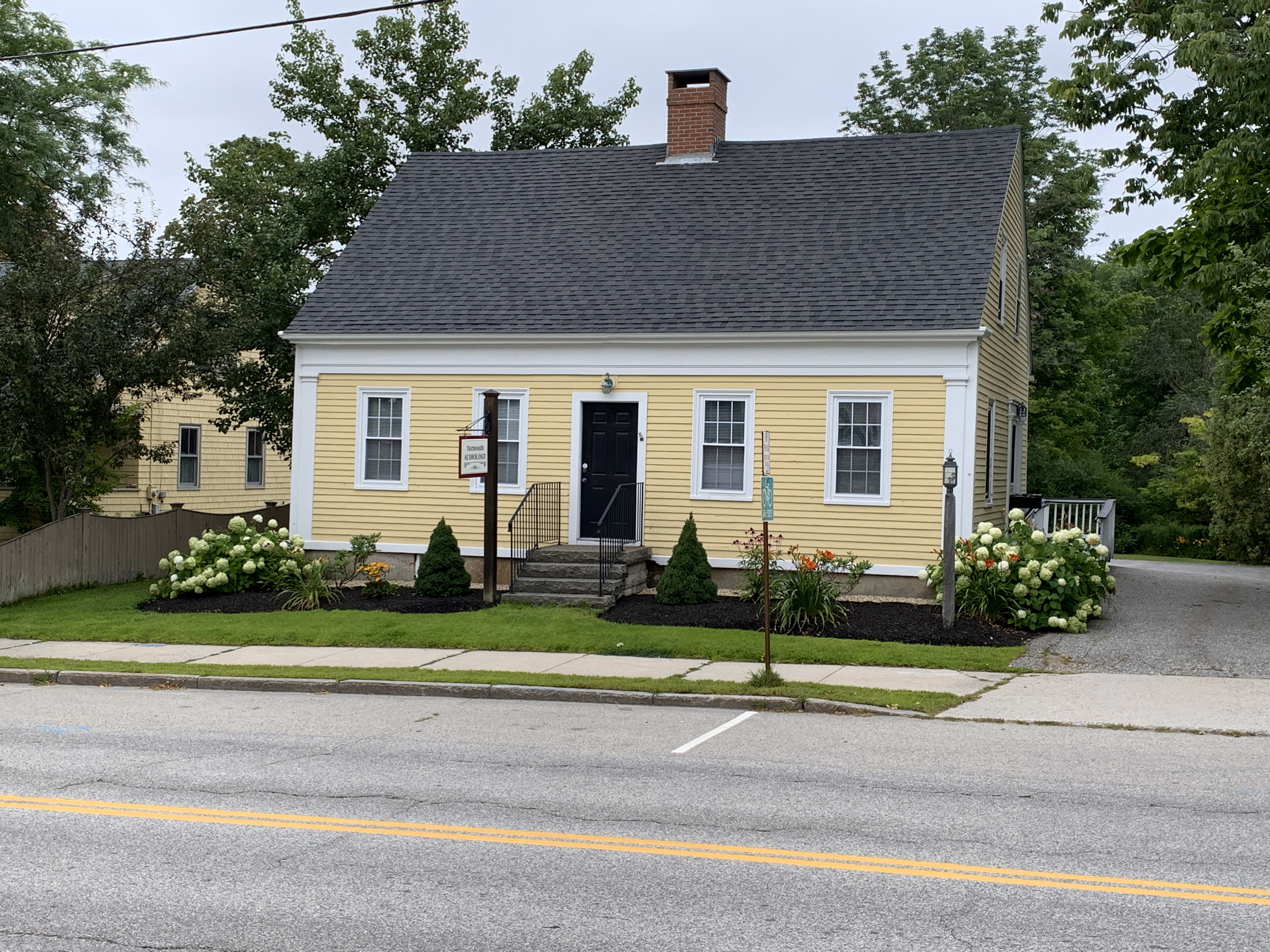
163 Main Street, now a business, was built around 1843

Brickyard Hollow is the central section of Main Street in Yarmouth, Maine, located between the Upper Village to the northwest and Lower Falls to the southeast. It is named for the brick-making business that was located across the street from the Masonic Hall (now the restaurant Gather) at 189 Main Street, beneath the U.S. Route 1 overpass, which was built in the 1870s.

A muddy valley up until the beginning of the 20th century, the Hollow was eventually reclaimed as a civic center by laying down a two-foot layer of black ash, from Forest Paper Company, to level it out. After constructing two new schools, the Merrill Memorial Library and a war memorial, town officials also decided to rename the area Centervale in order to improve its image. The name did not last, however.

Sylvanus Blanchard lived in the brick building at 158 Main Street around 1847, before moving to number 317. As of 2018, the original barn is still attached.

The cape at 163 Main Street was built around 1843. 171 Main Street, on the eastern corner of the York Street intersection, dates from about the same year. Across the intersection, at 179 Main Street, is a Greek Revival cape built in 1842.

A lithograph from 1851, depicting the area of Main Street serviced by York Street, shows the home of George Woods and, next door, the Yarmouth Institute, which he established as direct competition with North Yarmouth Academy (NYA). Although it attracted students from as far afield as Cuba, his institute lacked an endowment and closed after five years. Woods sold the building to Paul Blanchard in 1853. It was torn down in 1930. In 1859, while serving in his new role as chancellor of the University of Pittsburgh, a lawsuit involving his dispute with NYA precipitated the split in Yarmouth's First Parish Church.

In 1890, Yarmouth built a large new school building on the site of the present, 1975-built town hall. Grades 5 to 8 were on the first floor; the high school occupied the upper level. A three-storey high school was constructed next to this in 1900. When all of the high-school students were sent to North Yarmouth Academy in 1930, the building became another elementary school. In 1974, both buildings were demolished to make way for the current construction.

In 1903, six years before his death at the age of 76, Joseph Edward Merrill donated the funds to build a new library, while George W. Hammond donated the land from his Forest Paper Company. The architect was Alexander Longfellow, a nephew of the poet Henry Wadsworth Longfellow. Also involved in the library's construction was John Coombs, father of George and Albert. Despite the occasional flood, town offices were eventually established in the library's basement. The flooding was partly caused by the blockage of Cleaves Brook (to the left of the town hall) — which formerly drained the whole center of town — when Brickyard Hollow was filled in.

Directly across the street from the library stood the Dumphy house and barn. These were auctioned off in 1921, creating more public space in Centervale.

In 1904, the town's Civil War veterans sought permission to place a soldiers monument in front of the new schools. With funds lacking, it was put off until after World War I (during which 106 Yarmouth residents served), when the project was completed in tandem with a board of trade plan to erect a bandstand. The resulting octagonal structure, in the Doric order, was adorned by a plaque to the veterans. The words "Memorial To Men of Yarmouth in War Service" appeared just below the roof line. The structure was inadequately maintained, however, and had to be removed when rotting floorboards resulted in injuries.

In 1929, a new centralized post office was built to the east of the present 1932-dedicated Anderson-Mayberry American Legion Hall (named for servicemen Edgar Anderson and Edwin Mayberry, who both died from the Spanish flu while based at Fort Devens). On the left side of this building was the Fidelity Trust Company. The bank failed early in the Great Depression of the 1930s. To the east of the post office stood the Knights of Pythias Hall. It became the Pastime Theatre in the 1920s, then Yarmouth Theatre between 1942 and 1956. Harriman's IGA Foodliner moved here in the late 20th century from its Main and West Elm Streets location. A KeyBank (formerly Casco Bank) and the parking lot for NYA's Priscilla Savage Middle School now stand in its place.

During the middle of the 20th century, in the plaza across Cleaves Street that formerly housed a 7-Eleven and, until 2017, Anthony's Dry Cleaners & Laundromat, was the Dairy Joy ice-creamery, in front, and the Korner Kitchen (formerly the Snack Shack) behind it.

Across the street, at the intersection of Main and School Streets (in the building filled by People's United Bank), the post office occupied its final location before its move to Forest Falls Drive.

Ship owner Cyrus Foss Sargent's home, built around 1864, stands at 251 Main Street. It ran as the Village Inn between 1916 and 1920.

In 1867, the building at 261 Main Street (across from Hancock Lumber) was built for Sylvanus Cushing Blanchard. Later owners of the house include Joseph York Hodsdon, proprietor of Hodsdon Shoe Company, and Dr. Fiore Agesilao Parisi.

273 Main Street, which stands at the entrance to Camp Hammond, is a "highly-altered former church" built in 1880. In November 1900, the saw mill of W. H. Walker and A. H. Cleaves was established across from where the Grand Trunk depot stands today.

On January 2, 2009, twenty-six businesses located at 500 Route 1 were destroyed in an arson attack. The entire block, located near to the point at which Route 1 passes over Main Street, was pulled down shortly thereafter. Damage was estimated to be between $2 million and $4 million. Everett Stickney, of Exeter, New Hampshire, was convicted of starting the fire, along with another one in York, Maine, later that evening. On November 12, 2009, Stickney was sentenced to an eleven-and-a-half-year prison term and ordered to pay $3.7 million in compensation. The building was replaced in 2008 and several businesses have moved in.

In 2018, a new restaurant and brewery opened on the block under the name "Brickyard Hollow Brewing Company" with a mission of rebuilding the community with an accessible, comfortable space to gather in, and paying homage to the original Brickyard Hollow that was razed in 2009.

U.S. Route 1 arrived in town in the late 1940s, shortly after the conclusion of World War II.

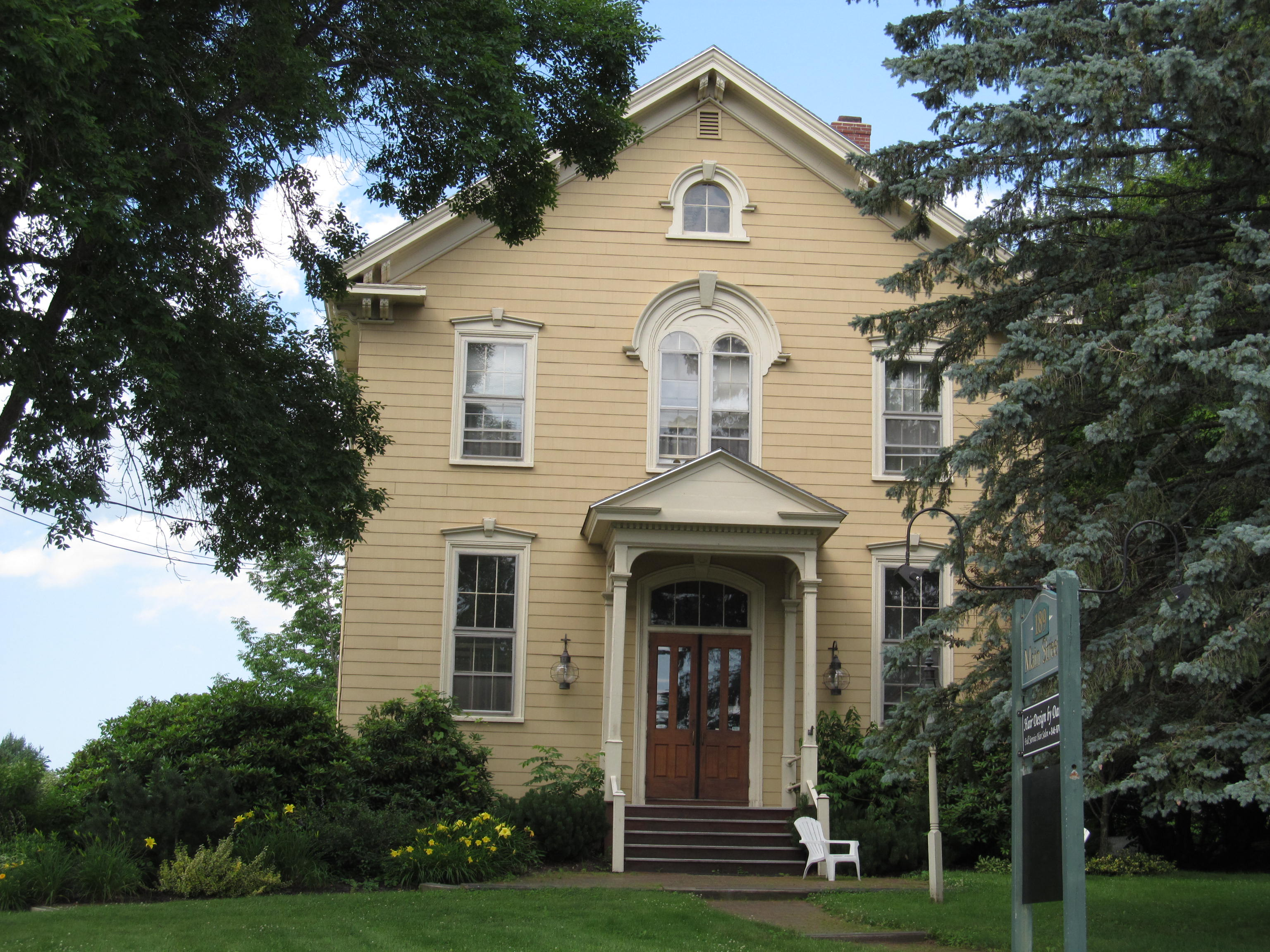
Former Masonic Lodge, 189 Main Street

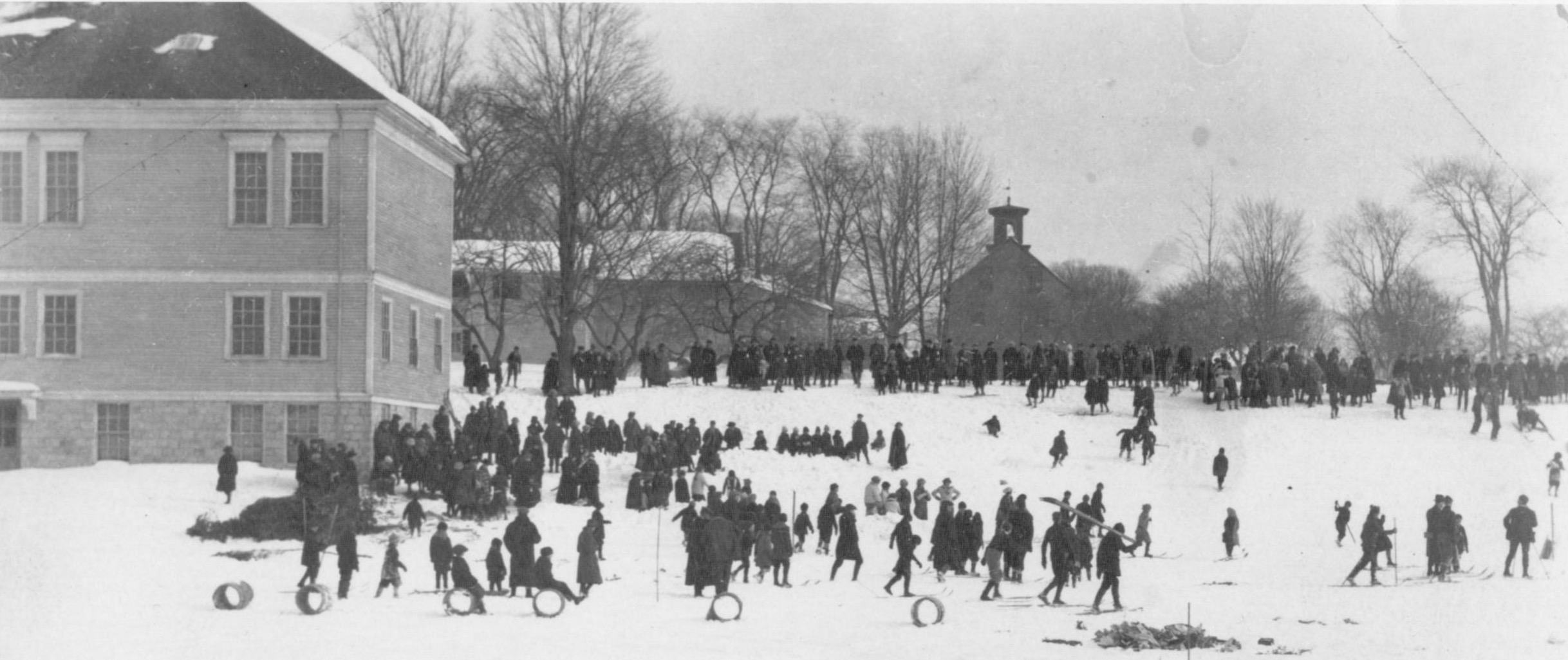
Brickyard Hollow, around where the town hall now stands, looking east towards NYA

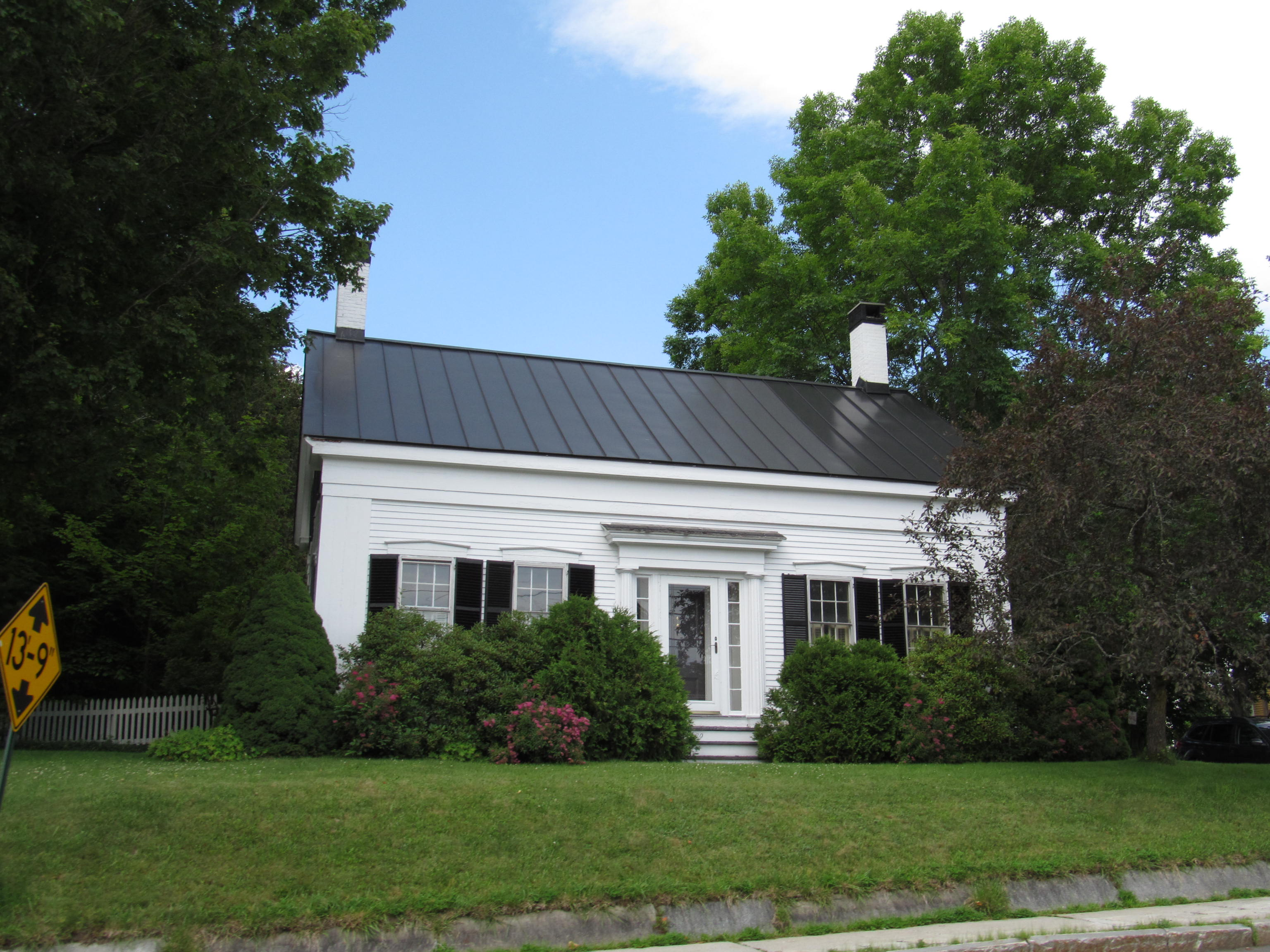
179 Main Street, built in 1842

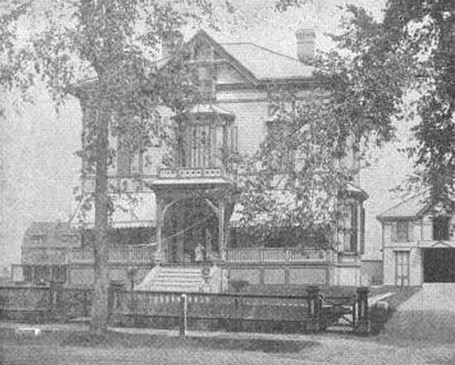
This house, at 261 Main Street, was built in 1879 as the home of Sylvanus Cushing Blanchard. Camp Hammond is visible in the background on the left. The carriage house on the right is now the parking lot of InterMed

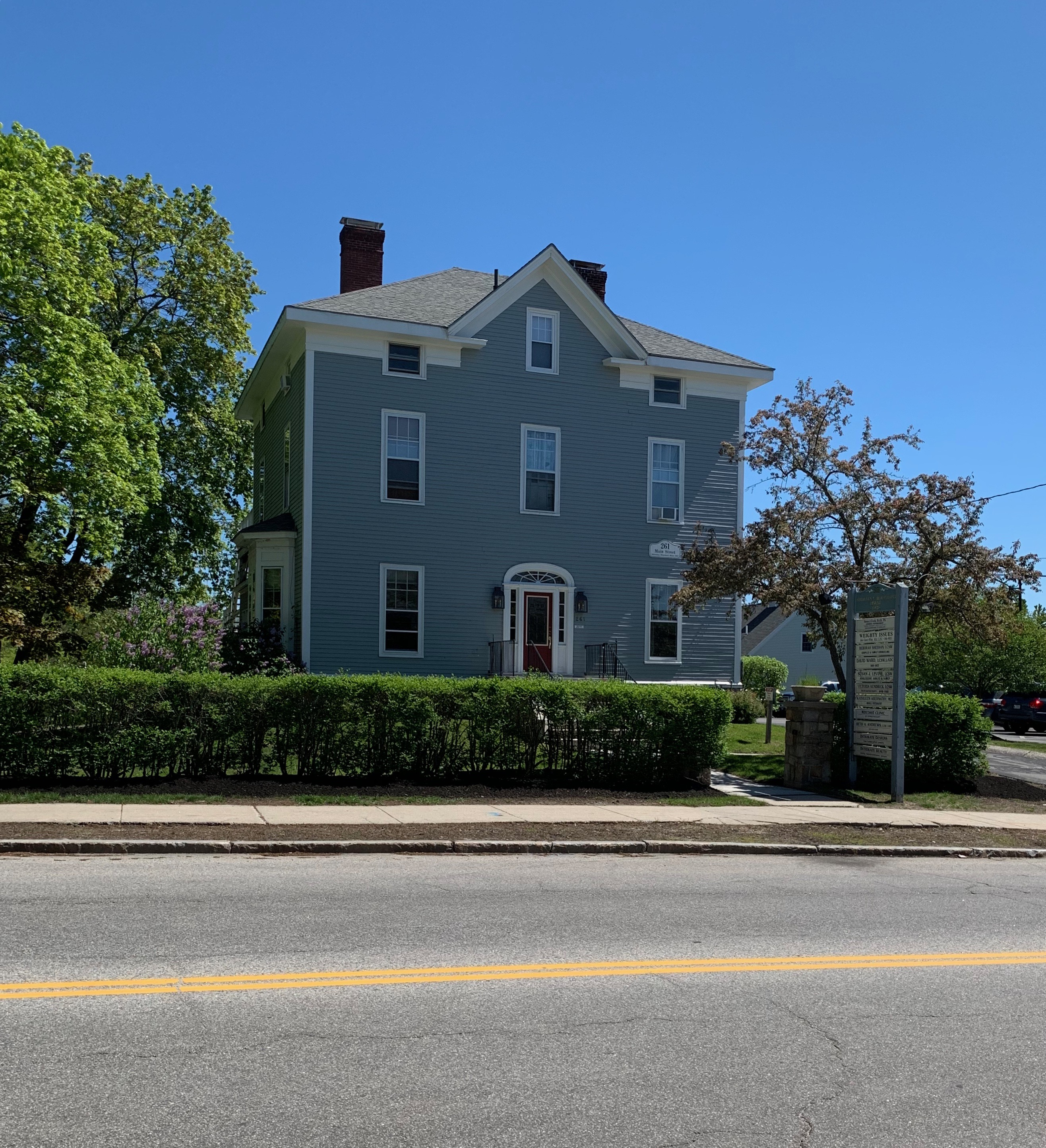
The much-altered building in 2019

== See also ==
- Historical buildings and structures of Yarmouth, Maine
