= David Cleaves =

American potter

- Born: September 1, 1794; Saco, District of Maine, Massachusetts, U.S.
- Died: February 13, 1860 (aged 65); Yarmouth, Maine, U.S.
- Resting place: Old Baptist Cemetery, Yarmouth, Maine
- Spouse: Lydia Corliss (m. 1818)

David Cleaves (September 1, 1794 – February 13, 1860) was an American potter in 19th-century Yarmouth, Maine. Cleaves Brook and Cleaves Street in that town are now named for him.

== Life and career ==
Cleaves was born in 1794 in Saco, District of Maine.

He married Lydia, daughter of Ebenezer Corliss, on May 31, 1818. The couple had two sons: Robert C. Cleaves, a potter, and Payne E. Cleaves, a sailor. They lived at a couple of addresses in Yarmouth, Maine, including today's 30 West Elm Street.

In the early 19th century, Cleaves worked for a pottery business owned by his father-in-law and George Bruce. They ran it until 1820, when it was passed to Cleaves and his son, Robert. In 1856, they were in business alongside that of fellow potters Joel Brooks and Benjamin Foster, son of Nathaniel.

== Death and legacy ==
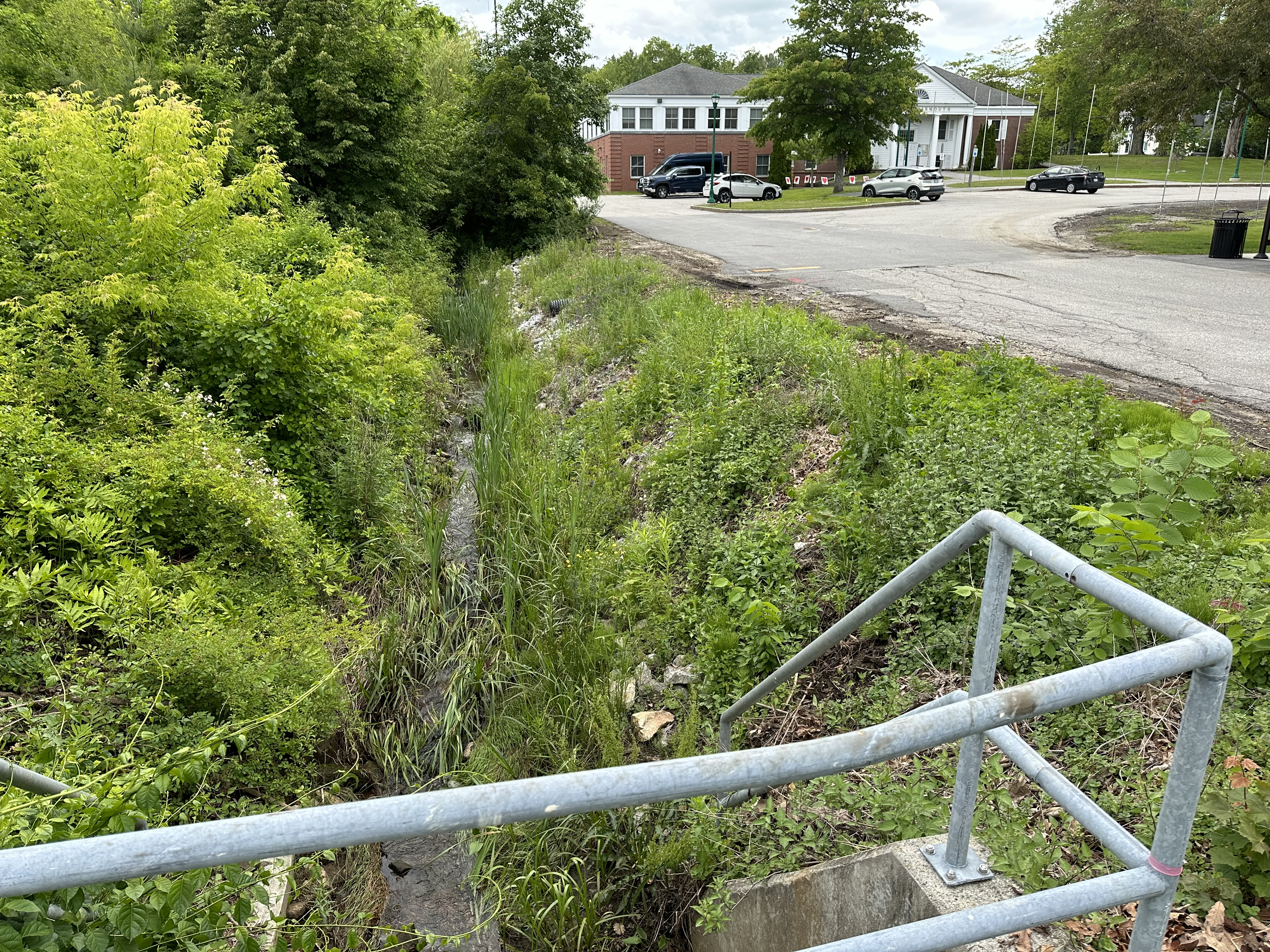
Cleaves Brook, beside Yarmouth town hall

Cleaves died in 1860, aged 65. He was interred in the Old Baptist Cemetery in Yarmouth, beside his wife.

Cleaves Street and Cleaves Brook, in the area of Yarmouth today known as Brickyard Hollow, are now named for him. Clay for Yarmouth's numerous potteries were dug from Brickyard Hollow, prior to it being filled in in the 20th century.
