= Brick Store (Yarmouth, Maine) =

Historic building in Yarmouth, Maine

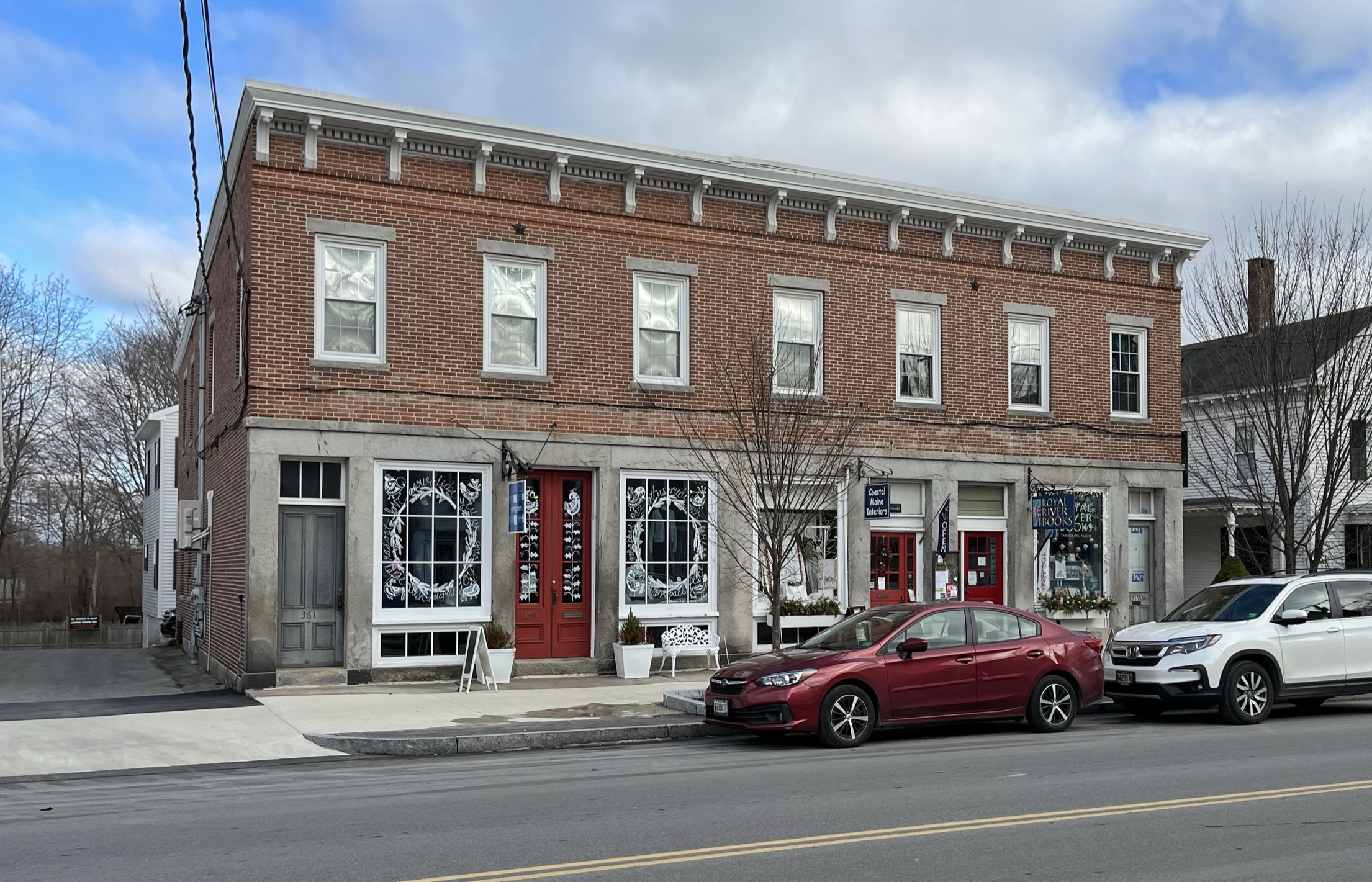
- The building in 2022. An American elm, dating to at least 1817, formerly stood in front of the building's left side
- Interactive map of the Brick Store area

General information
- Location: 357 Main Street, Yarmouth, Maine, United States
- Coordinates: 43.80339980°N 70.1930046°W
- Completed: 1862 (164 years ago)

Technical details
- Floor count: 2

Brick Store is the colloquial name given to a historic three-unit building in Yarmouth, Maine, United States. Located at 357 Main Street, near its junction with Elm Street in the town's Upper Village, the building was completed in 1862. It has been the home to several business.

== History ==
The building was built by Samuel Fogg and Ansel Loring, with Fogg later occupying part of it with his business, alongside that of Lawrence, Brown & Co. It was completed in 1862, and its early tenants were William Marston's dry goods store (which occupied the site for around a century) and Leone R. Cook's apothecary, where Frank W. Bucknam was an apprentice. For over a century and a half, much of the retail trade in the Upper Village centered around these brick stores.

An American elm, which pre-dated the building by at least forty-five years, stood in front of it for 118 years. It had a bulletin board attached to it, on which were posted public notices "and satirical comments about town affairs." The board is now affixed to the building. The tree was cut down in 1980, when Dutch elm disease began sweeping through the town.

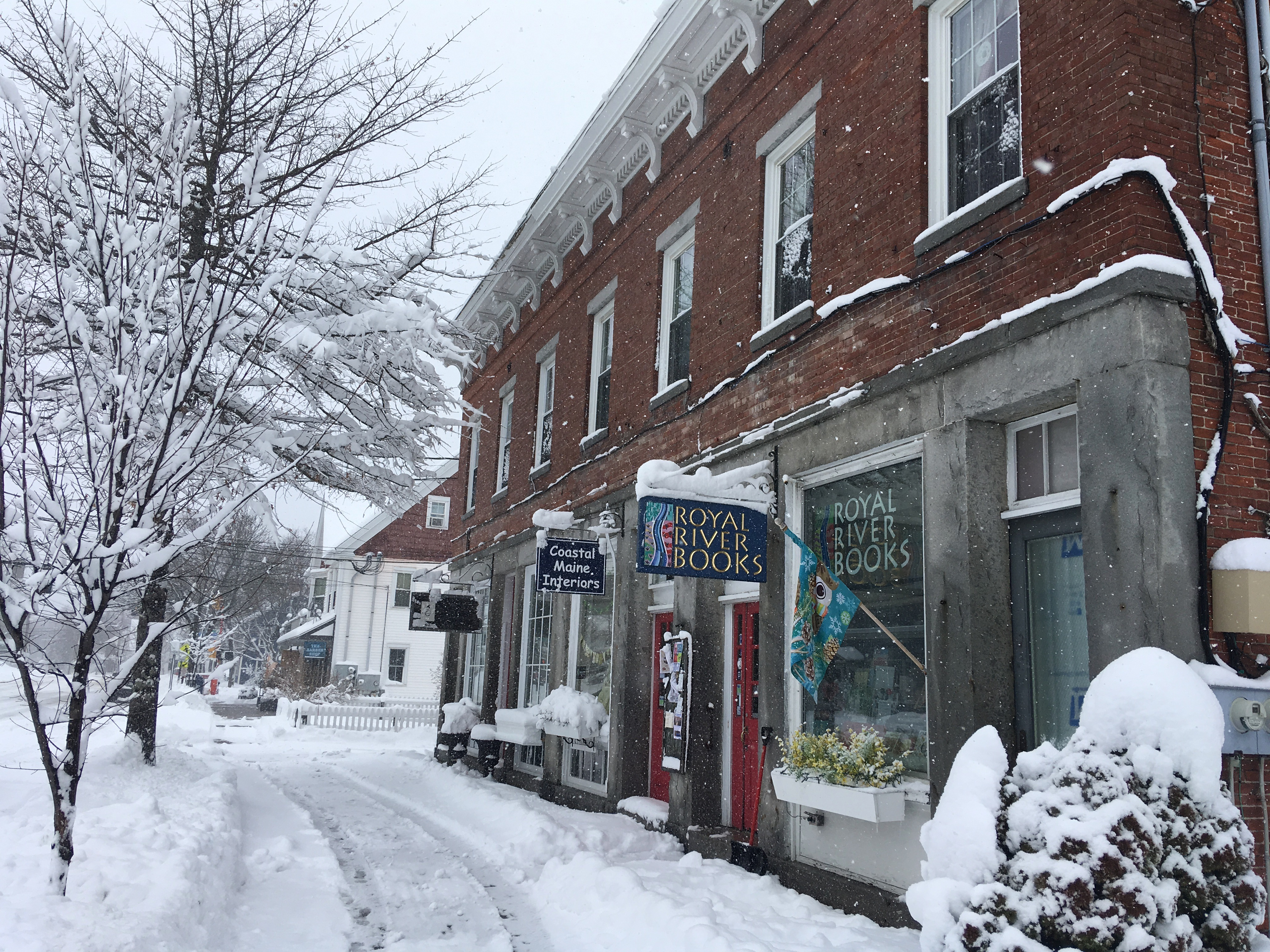
Looking west, towards "the Corner" of Main Street and Elm Street, 2017

== See also ==
- Historical buildings and structures of Yarmouth, Maine
