= Upper Village =

Upper Village The Corner
- Neighborhood
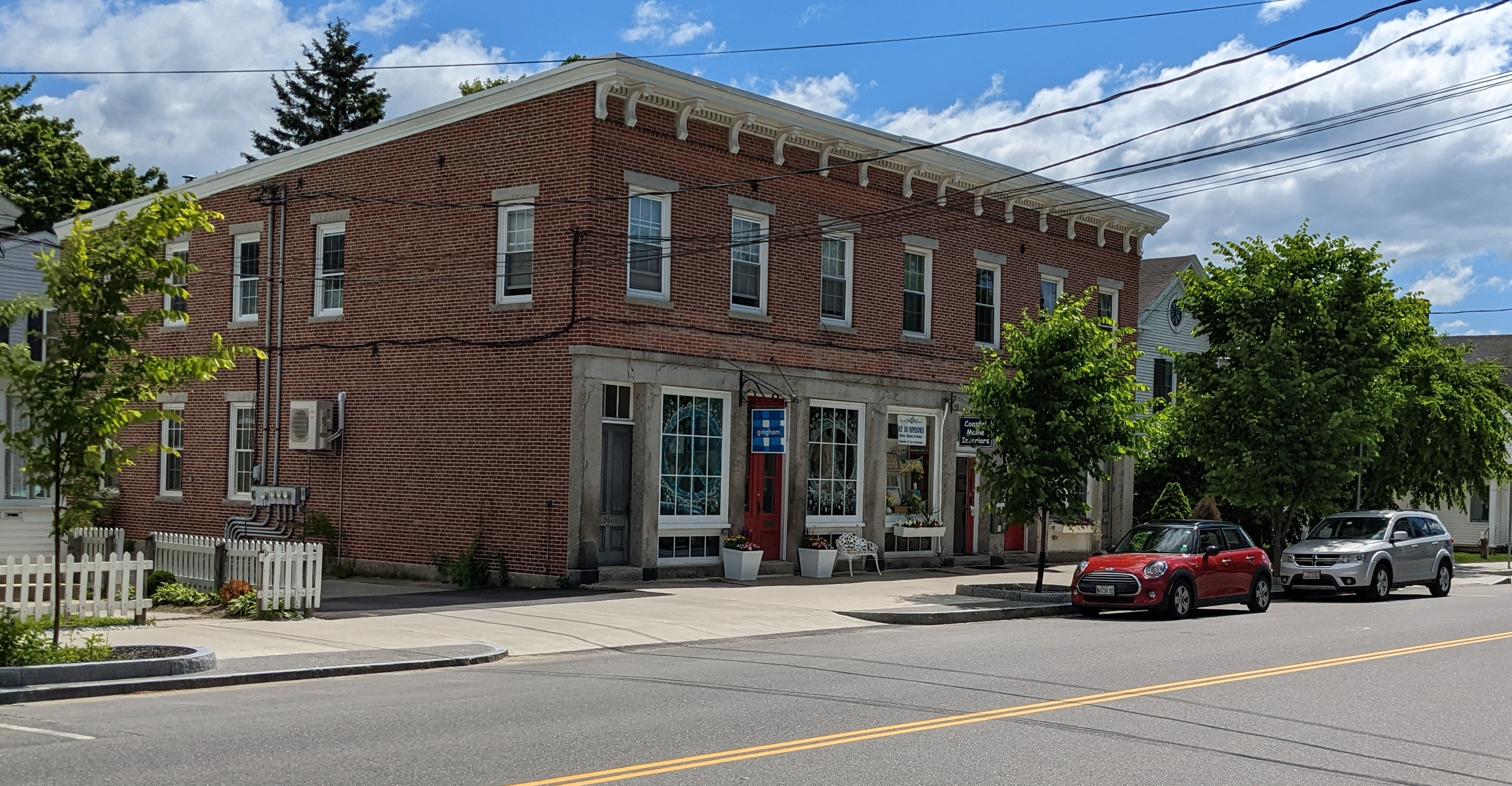
- This brick building, built in 1862 by Samuel Fogg and Ansel Loring, used to house (from left to right) Marston's dry goods store and Leone R. Cook's apothecary
- Interactive map of Upper Village
- Country: United States
- State: Maine
- County: Cumberland
- Towns: Yarmouth
- Time zone: UTC-5 (Eastern (EST))
  - Summer (DST): UTC-4 (EDT)

Upper Village is the colloquial name for the western end of Main Street in Yarmouth, Maine, centered around its intersection with Elm Street. It is also known as the Corner.

Businesses and residences in the Upper Village and the area around the intersection of Main and Elm Street, which officially became known as Yarmouthville in 1882, are listed below, roughly from west to east.

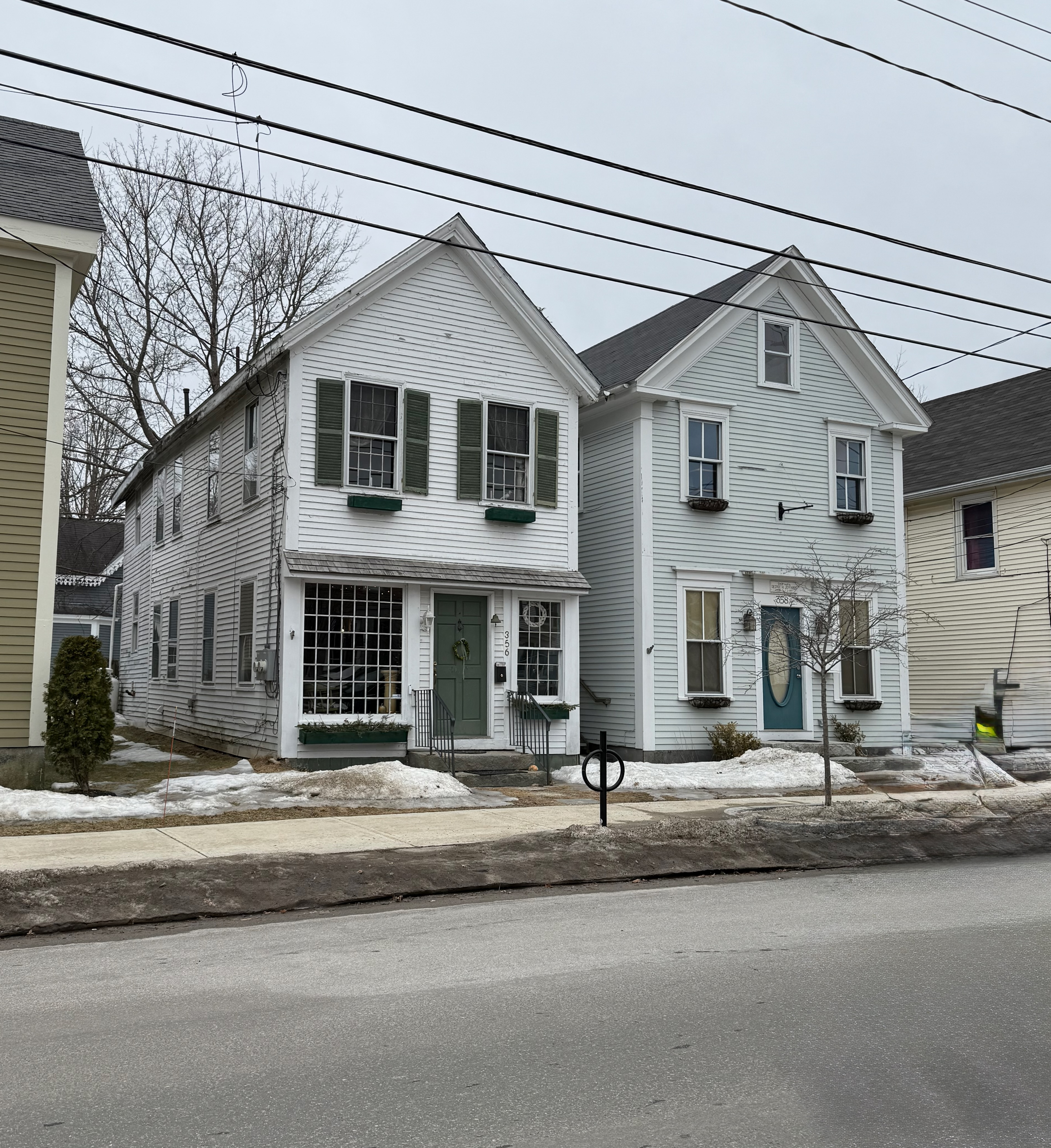
356 and 358 Main Street in 2025

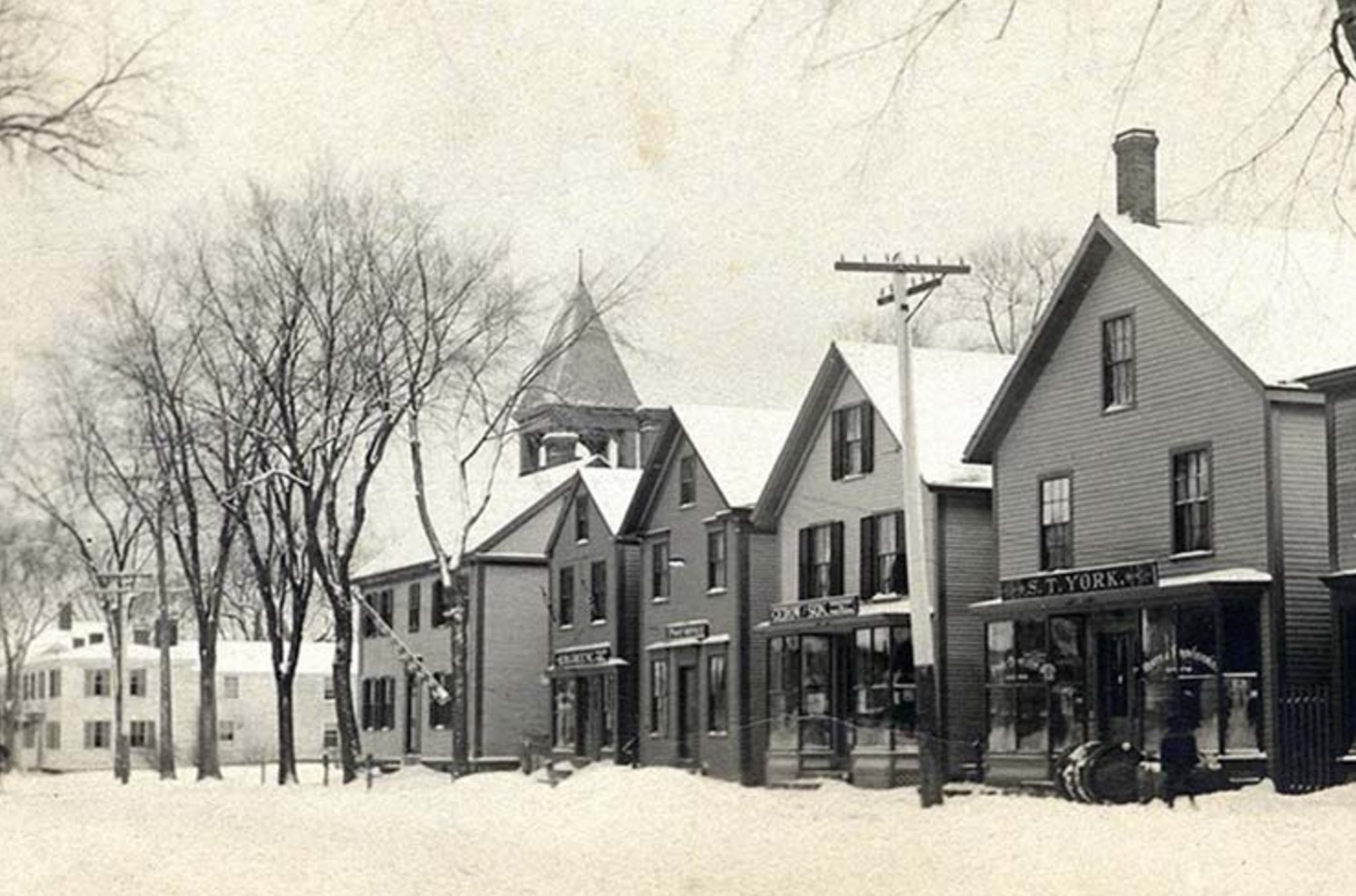
The southern side of Main Street, looking southeast from Main and East Elm Streets. The building on the right, formerly Samuel True York's grocery store, no longer exists

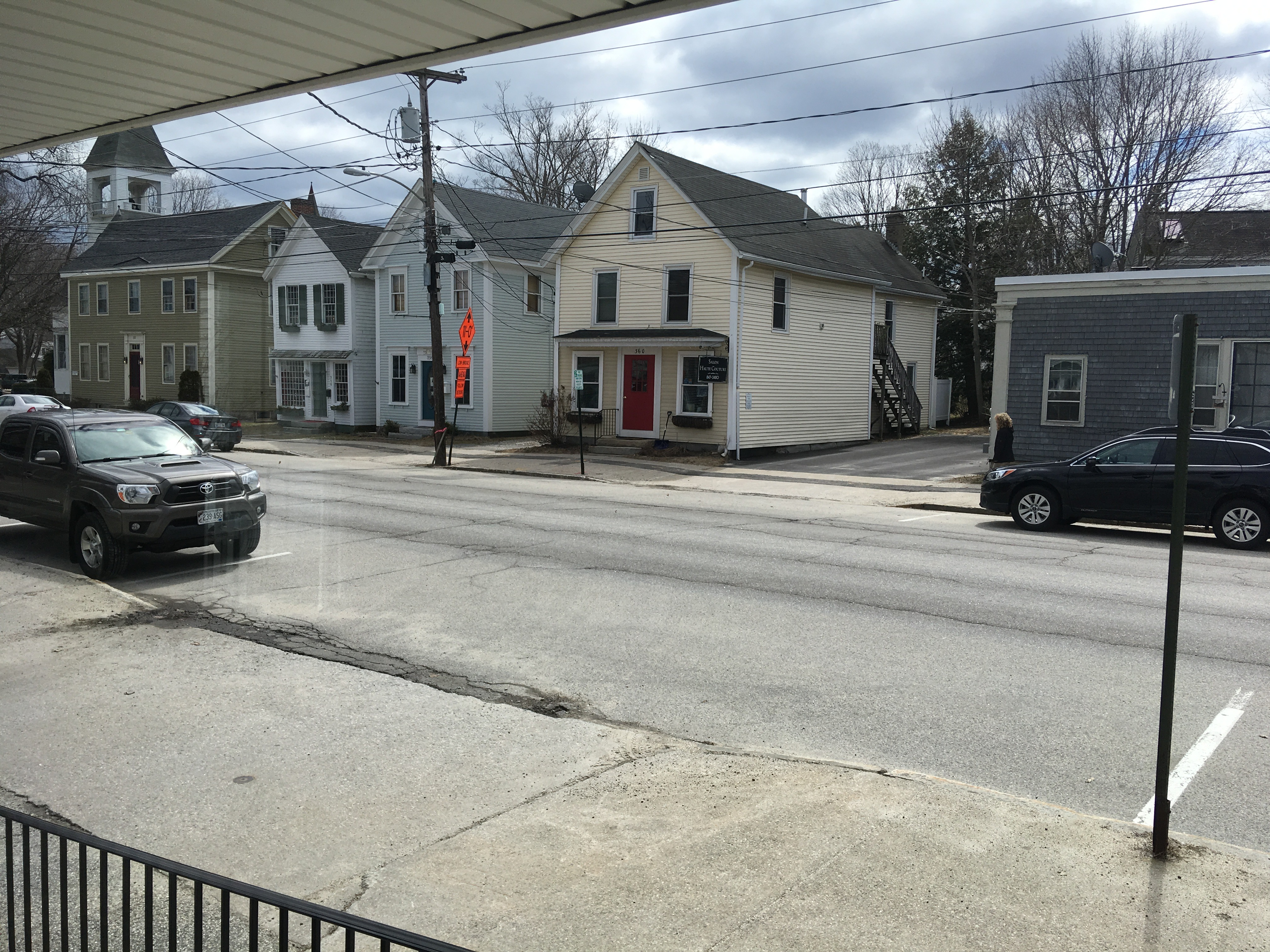
A 2018 view

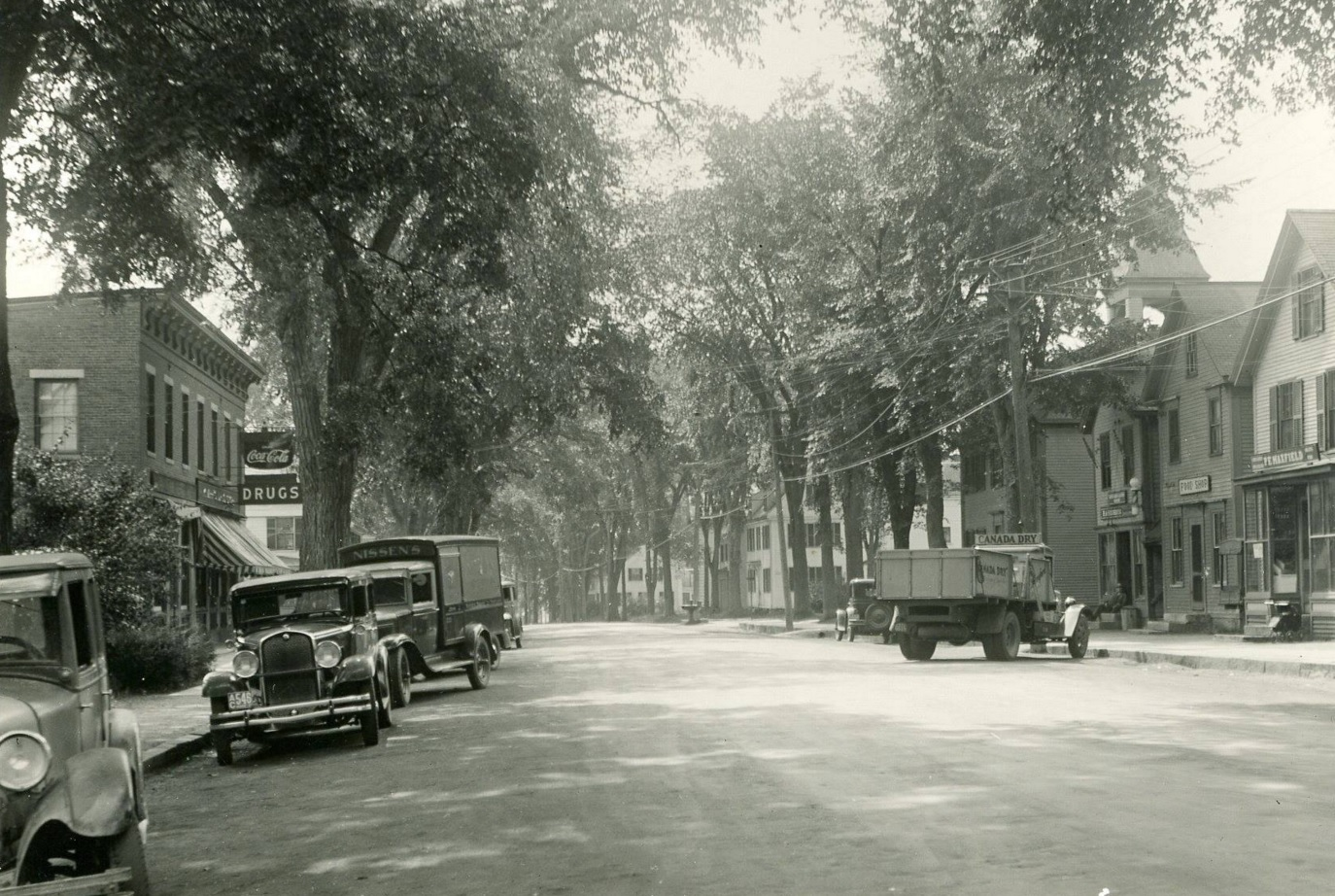
A 1947 view from the Elm Street intersection

A house that stood at the corner of Main and East Elm was moved to 45 Baker Street around 1890.

In the mid-to-late 1870s, diagonally across from where the restaurant Salsa now is, was Jeremiah Mitchell's "Temperance House" tavern. Mitchell died in 1869, aged about 31. The inn's location later became the site of Wilfred W. Dunn's house, then, between 1959 and 1972, Norton's Texaco gas station, then, between 1973 and 1978, one by a man named Morin. It is now Latchstring Park.

After his death in 1811, the family of Dr. William Parsons moved into a colonial home, built around 1790 by its first occupant, Ebenezer Corliss, where the single-storey building now stands at the corner of Main and West Elm Streets. The house was torn down in 1945; the existing building, at today's 366, has since been widened. It formerly housed Peck's pool hall, Harriman's IGA Foodliner, and Turner's Television sales and service business.

Edgar Read Smith's grocery store, later that of Sam York, was located to the east of the Parsons residence. Bishops (better known as Goodies) was here in the 20th century. The building was erected in 1890; like the Parsons' residence, however, it is now gone.

Adelaide Abbott's millinery shop, located to the east of York's.

The building that housed George H. Jefferd's harness shop (today's 358 Main Street) was built in 1890. Isaac Johnson's barbershop was located above Jefferd's. Set back, behind number 358, is 350. It dates to 1890.

At today's 356 Main Street was a barber shop called Quick Cut Charlie.

The post office opened in May 1882. Its first postmistress was W. L. Haskell, followed by Joseph Raynes in 1886. He remained in the position for 28 years, leaving the post in 1914 to Beecher True Lane. Anna Tibbetts Douglass followed in 1919. This branch was closed in 1928, and a village carrier system began at the central office.

At the corner of Main and East Elm Streets stood a nail mill in 1807. (East Elm Street was known for a period as Mill Street, before today's incarnation was given its name.) In 1891, what was then Nathaniel Foster's pottery was torn down, after about fifty years in existence, and a new building was constructed. Since then, more than thirty different business or owners have set up here, including, between 1906 and 1935, Arthur and Harry Storer's hardware store, Storer Bros. It was later John Ambrose Griffin's hardware store, and became Andy's Handy Store – named for proprietor, Leland "Andy" Anderson. In 1935, a 31-year-old Anderson combined the two wooden buildings of Griffin's and an adjacent grocery store (which sold produce "at Portland prices"). Colloquially named Handy Andy's, it became occupied by OTTO Pizza in 2014. Thoroughfare have occupied the entire building since early 2022.

William Marston's dry goods store (founded in 1859; closed circa 1968). It occupied the Brick Store for around a century.

Located next door to Marston's was Leone R. Cook's apothecary, where Frank Bucknam was an apprentice. Cook arrived in Yarmouth around 1880.

Harold Roy "Snap" Moxcey's barbershop, which he ran with his father Clarence ("Pop"), was located at the corner of Main and Center Streets, across Center Street from the Baptist church. The building was moved around 1990 and now stands on the property of 463 Lafayette Street, across from the Ledge Cemetery. Ernest C. Libby was an employee with the Moxceys for thirteen years before opening his own barber shop on Center Street.

To the right of the barbershop was Claude Kingsley's candy-distribution business.

A barber shop, beside the Baptist church, was owned by Charlie Reinsborough.

The Italianate number 347 is significant for its association with Captain Richard Harding, a sea captain, town clerk and state representative.

343 Main Street was the home of Smith's General Store for "much of the 1900s". It also had a couple of American Oil Company gas pumps just off the sidewalk.

339 Main Street was the home of local miller Amassa Baker, built in 1800.

Coombs Bros. (Albert and George) candy and grocery store (located at 298 Main Street in the building between Railroad Crossing and South Street in a different construction than what later occupied the location). Bert set up the town's telephone service in 1895. Elmer Ring's "washerette" later stood in the Coombs location, and it was he who changed the roofline and façade of the building. He also ran a hardware store, a heating and plumbing service, and a coal yard. In 2020, the town gave permission for developers to tear down the historic building. The building was demolished in 2024, to be replaced by sixteen condominiums.

Captain Eben York's mansion at 326 Main Street (occupied since 1910 by the Parish Office of the Sacred Heart Catholic Church next door). Father Joseph Quinn held services in the barn until it burned in 1913.

Where Peachy's Smoothie Cafe stands today at 301 Main Street was, from 1905 until 1913, Bernstein's Department Store. Robert Bernstein, born in Germany, saw his business burn down in July 1913. He reopened the store in a new location across the street.

St. Lawrence House – a hotel built, where the Mobil gas station near Camp Hammond stands today, to take advantage of the Atlantic and St. Lawrence Railroads coming through town. Circa 1872, it was renamed the Baker House, after its owner Jeremiah Baker (he previously lived at what is now 35 East Main Street, overlooking his shipyard, between 1857 and around 1871). It was the first of several name changes, including Royal River Hotel (when owned by O.E. Lowell in the late 19th century), U.S. House, Westcustogo House and Yarmouth Hotel. The expected tourists never materialized, and the hotel burned down in 1926. Grange Hall stood behind the hotel. Lowell Hall was in the second storey of the stable.

James O. Durgan's daguerreotype salon (located just to the east of the hotel; later Gad Hitchcock's coffin and casket showroom).

Alson Brawn's jewelry shop (at what was then 73 Main Street; formerly Sidney Bennett's Yarmouth Market, now Hancock Lumber).

309 Main Street, at the eastern corner of Mill Street, is an 1850s–1880s house.

An elm tree in front of Marston's store had a bulletin board nailed to it, upon which local residents posted, as early as 1817, public notices, circus posters and satirical comments about town affairs. Like almost all of Yarmouth's elms, it became afflicted by Dutch elm disease and was cut down in 1980.

== See also ==
- Historical buildings and structures of Yarmouth, Maine
