= Church Street (Yarmouth, Maine) =

Historic street in Yarmouth, Maine

Coordinates: 43.803108°N 70.194978°W

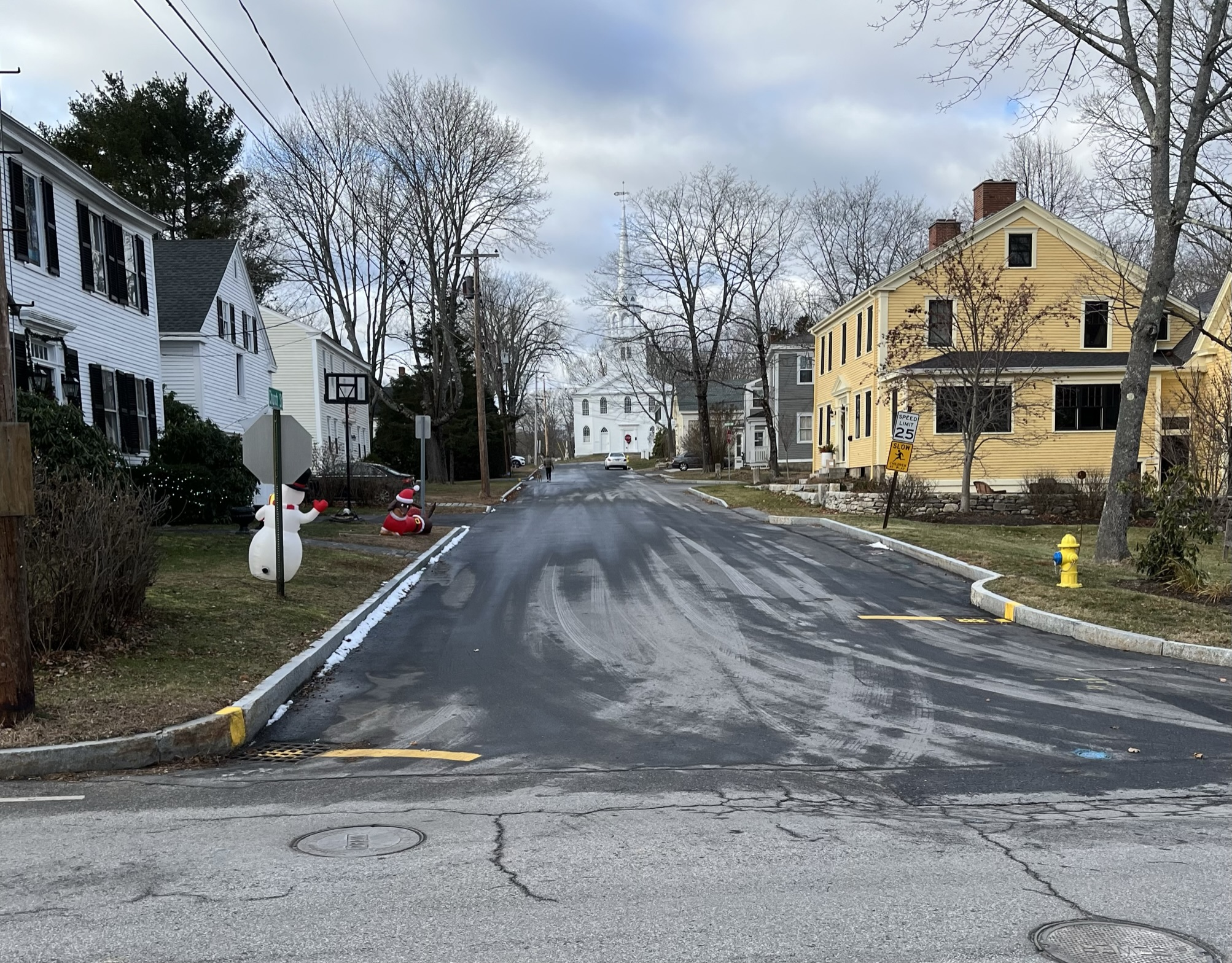
- Looking west along Church Street from West Elm Street
- Interactive map of Church Street
- Former name: Baptist Street
- Length: 0.08 mi (0.13 km)
- Location: Yarmouth, Maine, U.S.
- Western end: Hillside Street
- Eastern end: West Elm Street

Church Street is a historic street in Yarmouth, Maine, United States. It runs for about 425 feet (142 yd) from West Elm Street in the east to Hillside Street in the west. It was one of the first streets laid out after the town's population moved inland from the Broad Cove area in the 19th century. Several of its buildings are homes dating to the late 18th and early 19th centuries.

The street is named for the Old Baptist Meetinghouse, which stands opposite its western end. It was completed in 1796, and is now listed on the National Register of Historic Places.

== Architecture ==
John and Julie Dunn ran a store at 3 Church Street.

Reuben Byram built the building at 6 Church Street in 1804.

Number 9 is the Ebenezer Corliss House.

It is believed that Otis Briggs Pratt built the house at 14 Church Street, on land owned by Silas Merrill, between 1807 and 1812. Silas Merill also lived here. It later served as the homestead for the potter Nathaniel Foster and remained in the family until 1910.

An 1804 Federal-style house stands at 21 Church.

Edward B. Humphrey lived at number 27, which was built in 1850.

The Old John Corliss House, at number 35, dates from 1800.

Reverend Thomas Green (1761–1814), the first pastor at the nearby Baptist church, lived at 40 Church, built in 1798.

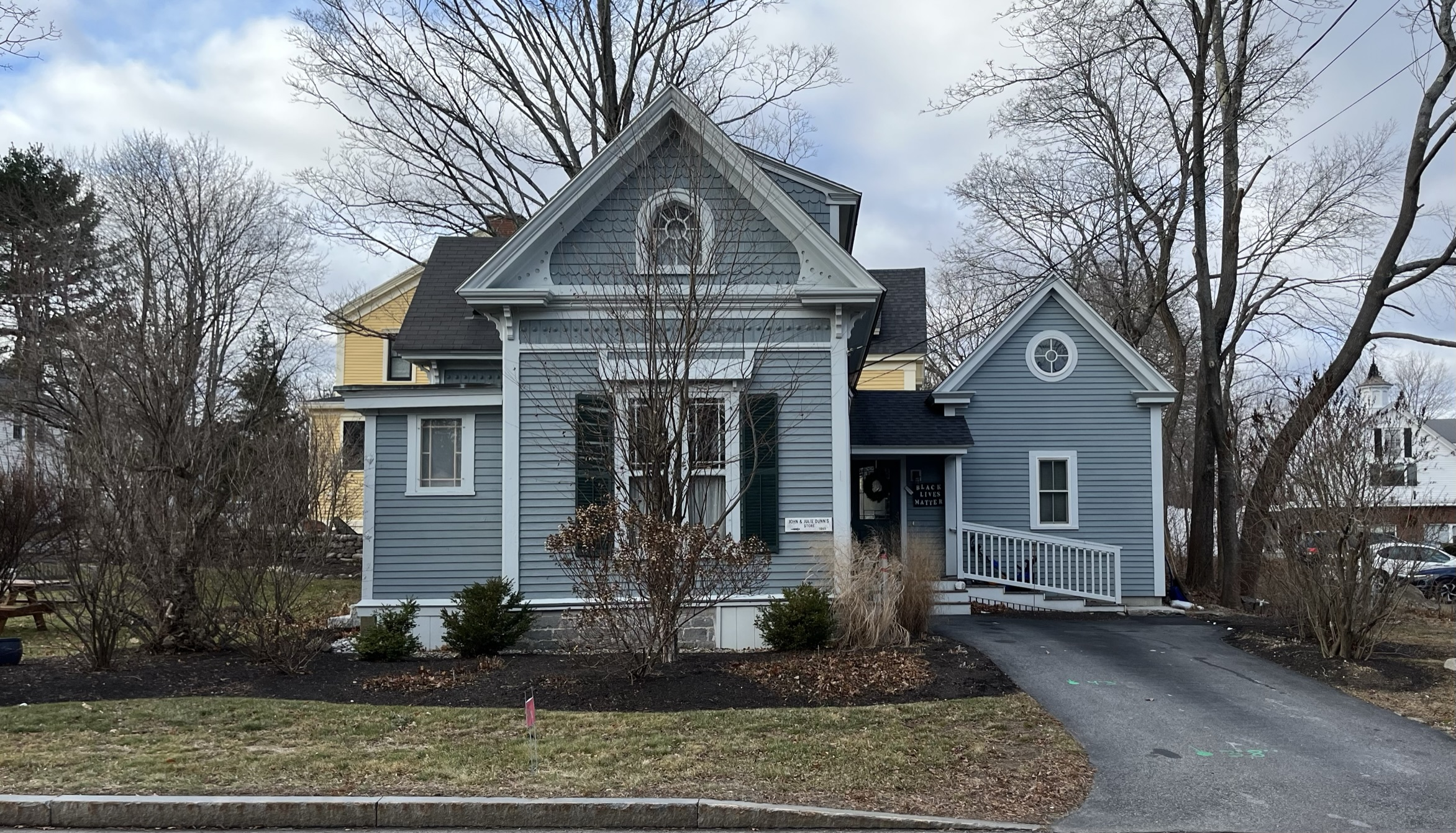
The former Dunn store, 3 Church Street

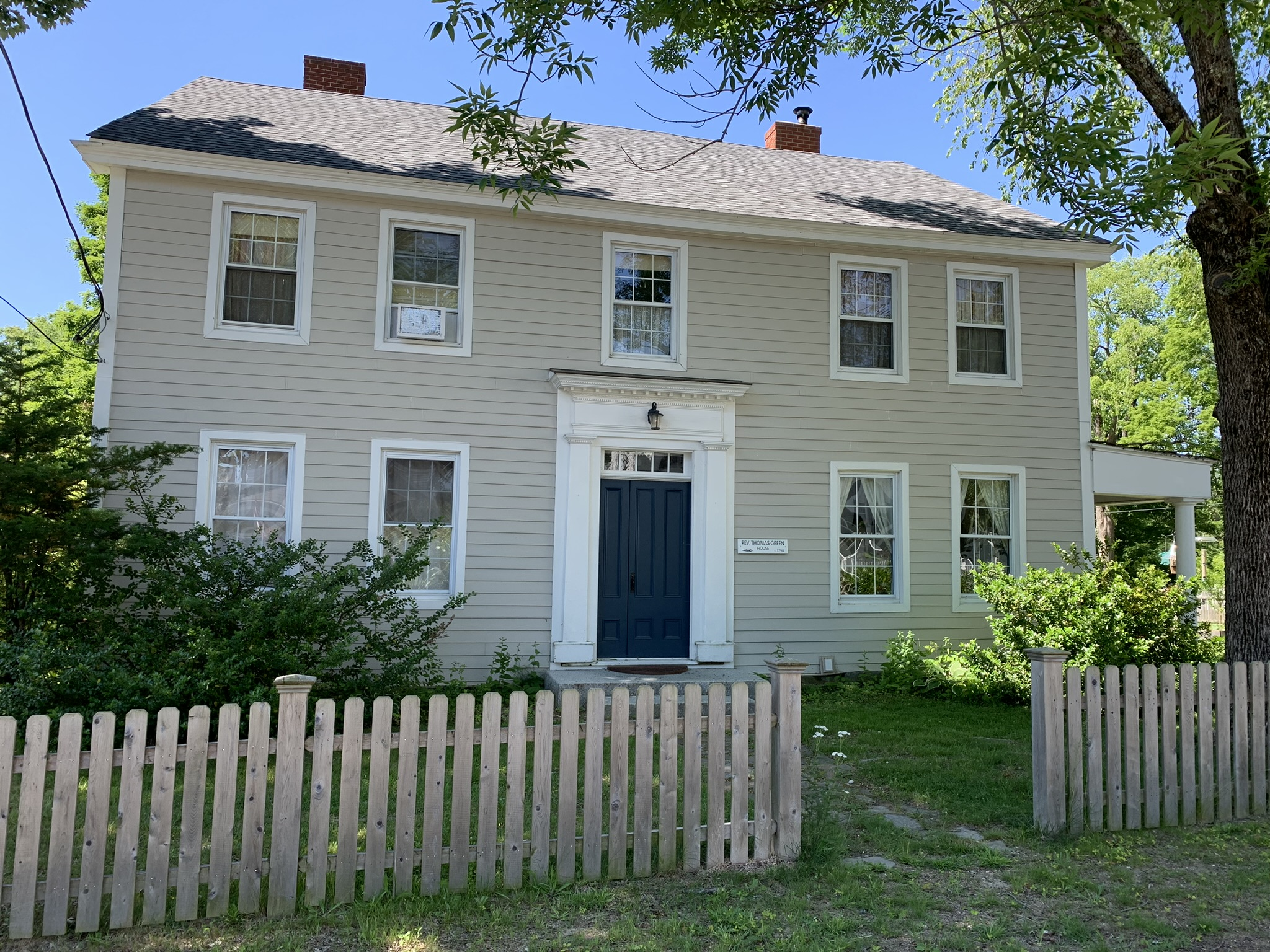
Reverend Thomas Green House, 40 Church Street

Old John Corliss House, 35 Church Street
