= Elm Street (Yarmouth, Maine) =

Prominent street in Yarmouth, Maine

Coordinates: 43.80364°N 70.19377°W

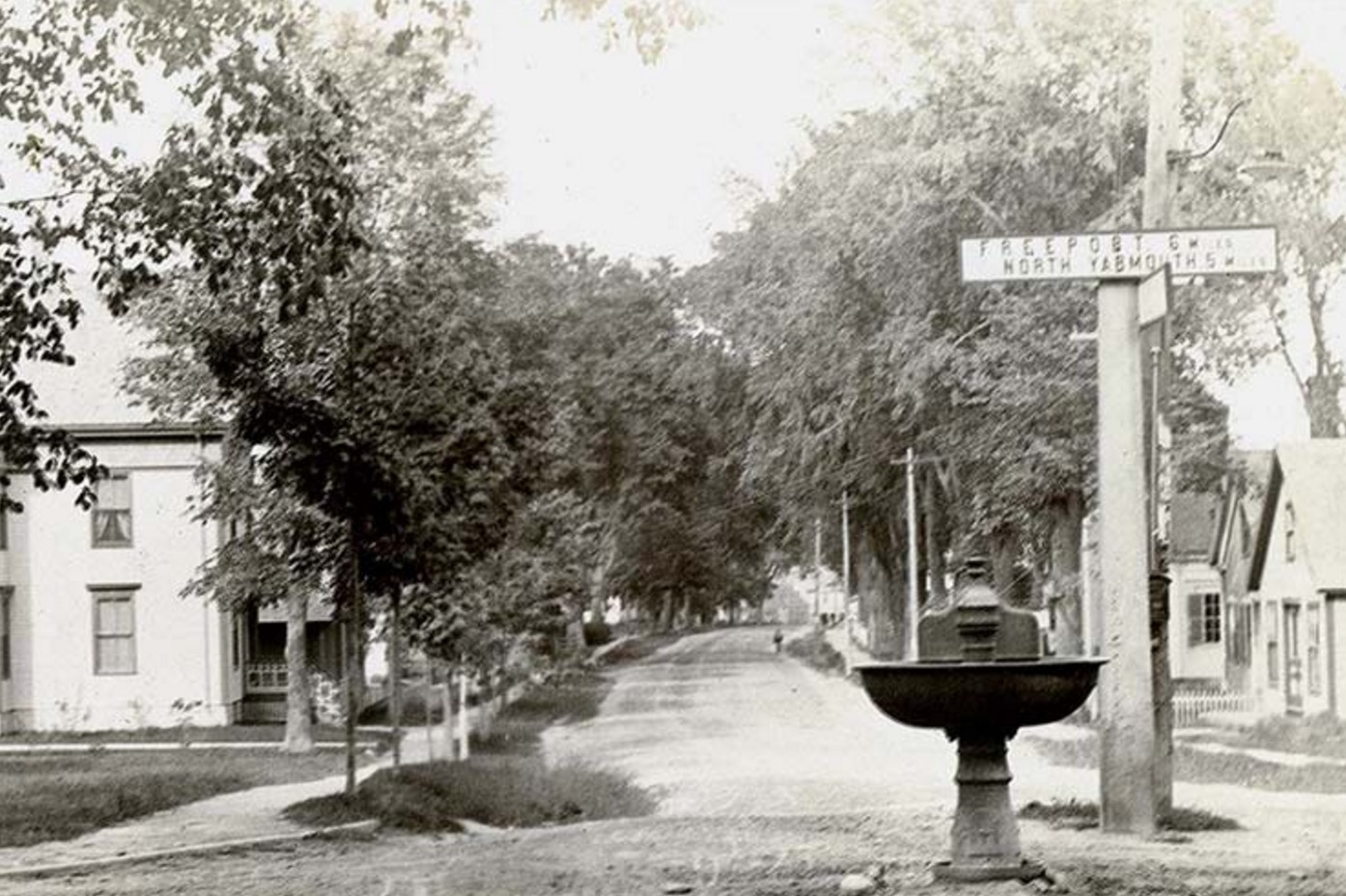
- East Elm Street from the Main Street intersection in the 19th century. The circular horse trough in view now stands at the nearby intersection of Main and Center streets
- Interactive map of Elm Street
- Former names: Mill Street; Portland road Chapel Street
- Length: 2.7 mi (4.3 km)
- Location: Yarmouth, Maine, U.S.
- Northern end: North Road
- Southern end: Portland Street

Elm Street is a prominent street in Yarmouth, Maine, United States. It runs for about 2.7 miles (4.3 km) from North Road in the north to Portland Street in the south. The street's addresses are split between "West Elm Street" and "East Elm Street", the transition occurring at Main Street in the Upper Village. Several of its buildings are homes dating to the late 18th and early 19th centuries.

The street is named for the proliferation of American elms that once stood in the area. In 1834, the town gave "Herbie", formerly the town's most prominent elm, some company by planting rows of elm trees along East Elm Street. From 1957 onward, however, most of them succumbed to Dutch elm disease. As of 2003, only twenty of Yarmouth's original 739 elms had survived.

== West Elm Street ==
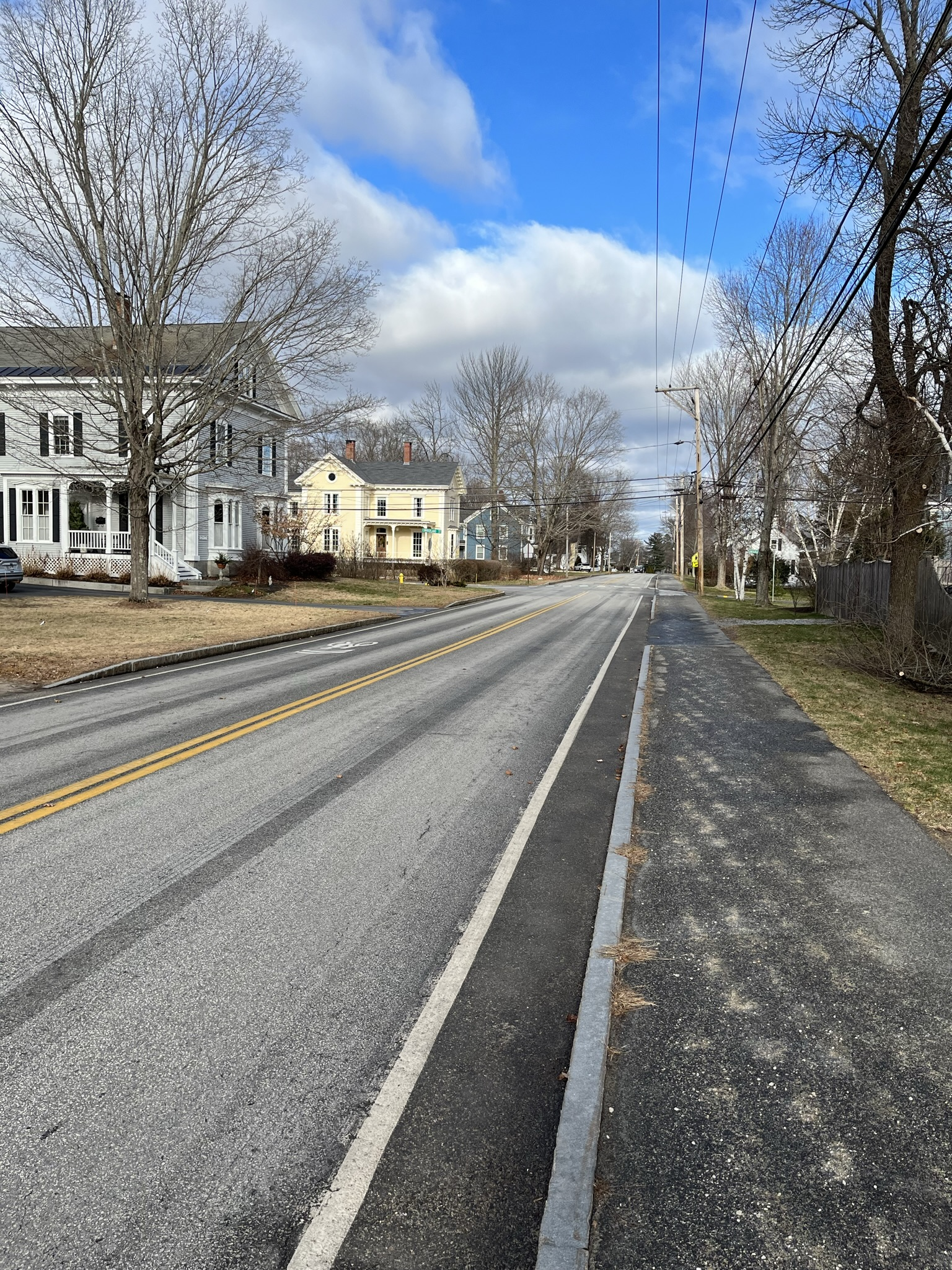
Looking north along West Elm Street to its intersection with Main Street and West Main Street (2022)

West Elm Street was an early route into Portland prior to the Presumpscot River being bridged at Martin's Point in Falmouth Foreside and the Presumpscot Falls Bridge in Falmouth, hence one of its former names was "Portland road". It was also known as Chapel Street for a period. It was a key stagecoach stop, and a large barn was built beside Jeremiah Mitchell's tavern to house horses. The inn's location later became the site of Wilfred W. Dunn's house, then, between 1959 and 1972, Norton's Texaco gas station.

The house of Richmond Cutter still stands at the southern corner of Church and West Elm Streets.

Two doors further south from Cutter's house, a Methodist church was built in 1898 to mark a revival of the religion. The church was disbanded thirty years later and the building became a meeting place for a fraternal group. The building, now painted yellow, has been converted into a residence.

22 West Elm Street dates to around 1870.

Potters David Cleaves and son Robert lived at the Greek Revival number 30.

Mason Reuben Byram lived in the three-story number 36.

Number 43 dates to around 1875.

Jeremiah Loring was the original owner of number 52.

Number 53 dates to the mid-19th century

Reuben Byram built number 58 for his daughter Louisa.

The Greek Revival number 62, whose 1874 barn is accessed from Center Street, dates from the 1840s.

65 West Elm is circa 1850.

At the northwestern corner of the Cumberland Street intersection stands number 73. It was built by Leonard Williams around 1863 and remained in his family for the next ninety years or so. Anti-Suffragist Williams' daughter, Harriet Bird, lived here from her birth in 1864 and 1919.

Captain Alfred Small lived in the 1870s-built number 95.

At the northwestern corner of the intersection with Deering Street stands number 111, designed by John Calvin Stevens and Albert Winslow Cobb for Captain Claudius Lawrence.

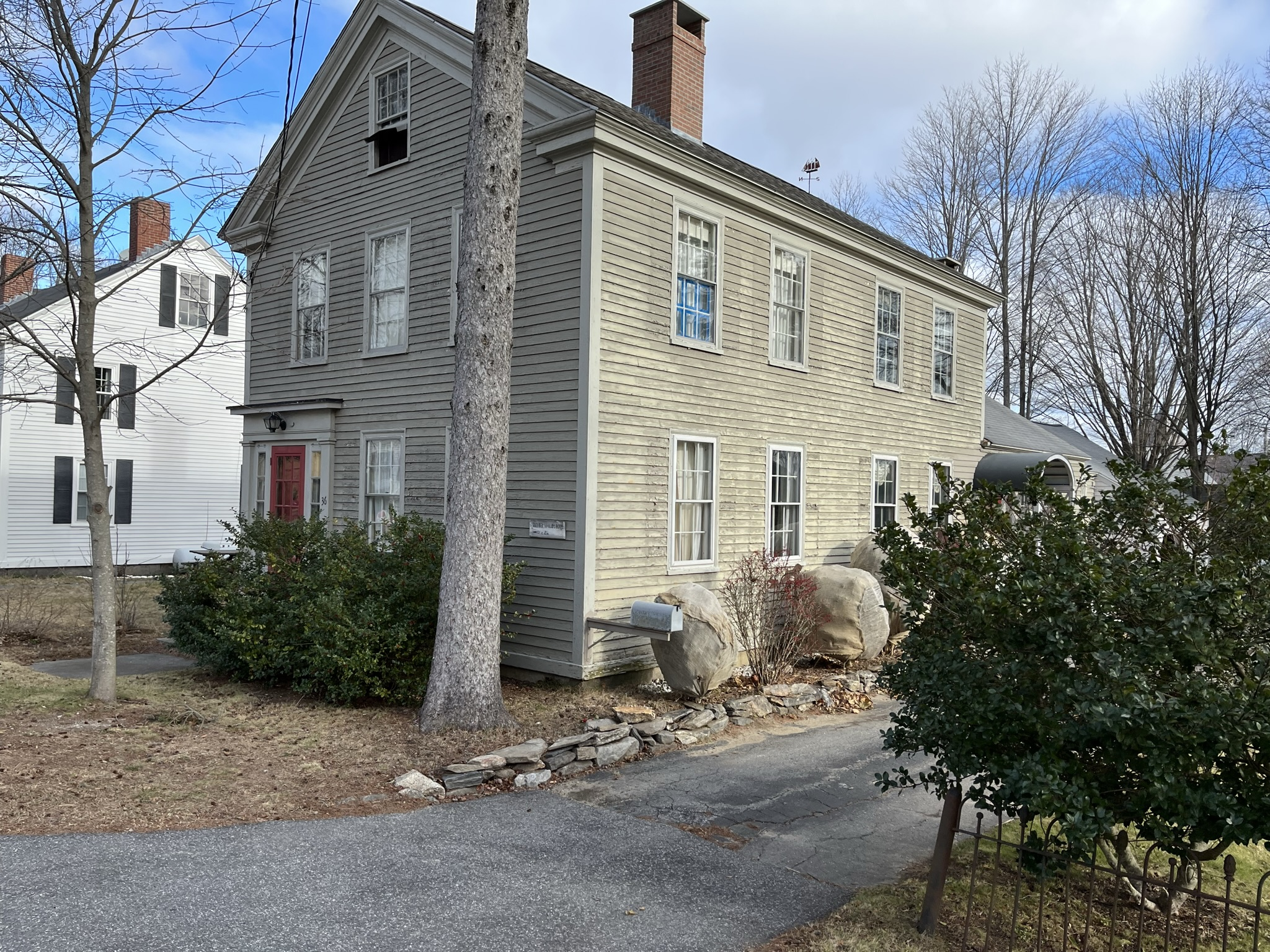
Reuben Byram House, 36 West Elm Street (2022)

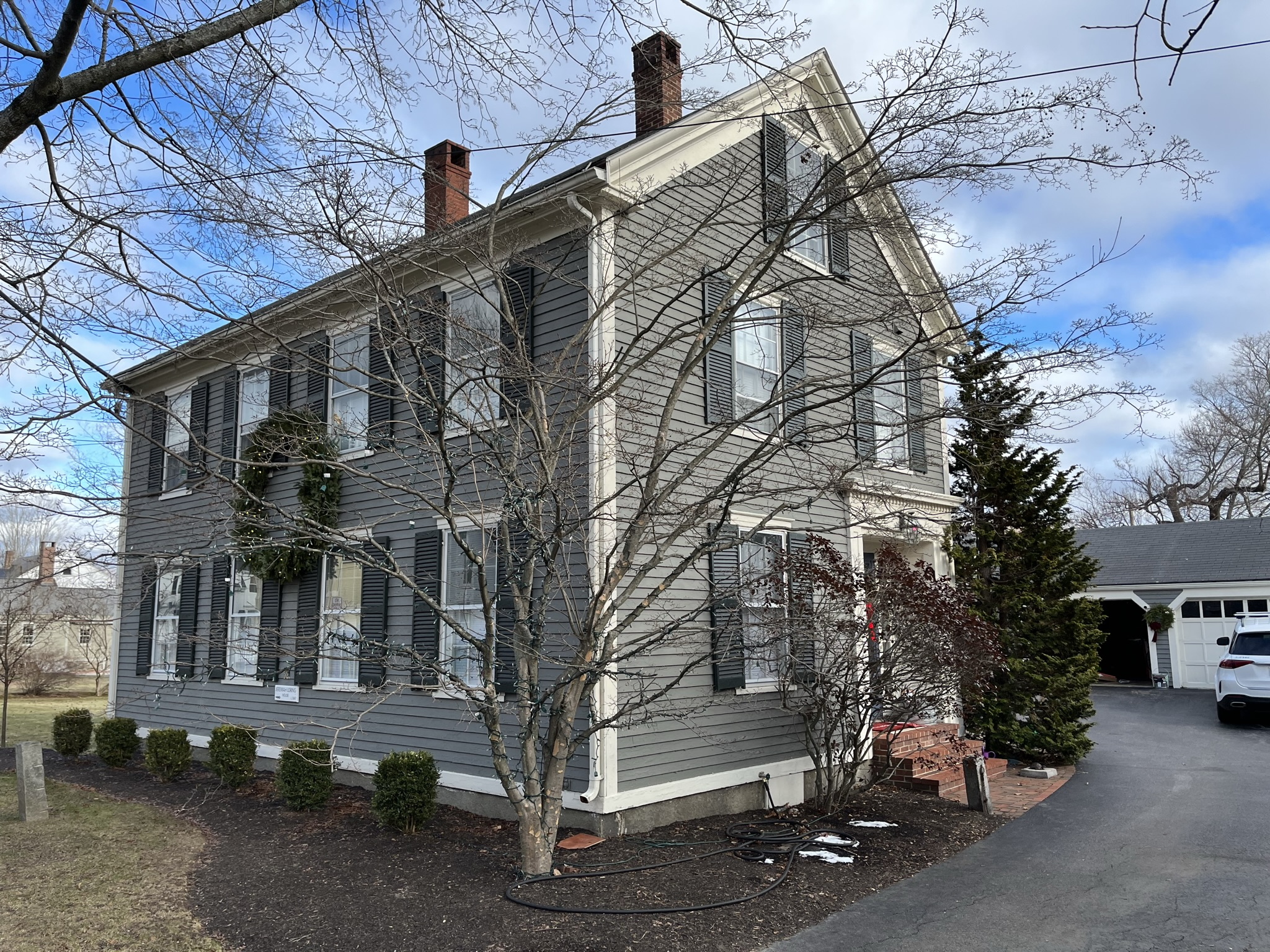
Jeremiah Loring House, 52 West Elm Street (2022)

== East Elm Street ==
Today's 40 East Elm Street was the home of potter Joel Brooks from 1850, but it was built in 1810. Brooks' pottery buildings stood behind the house

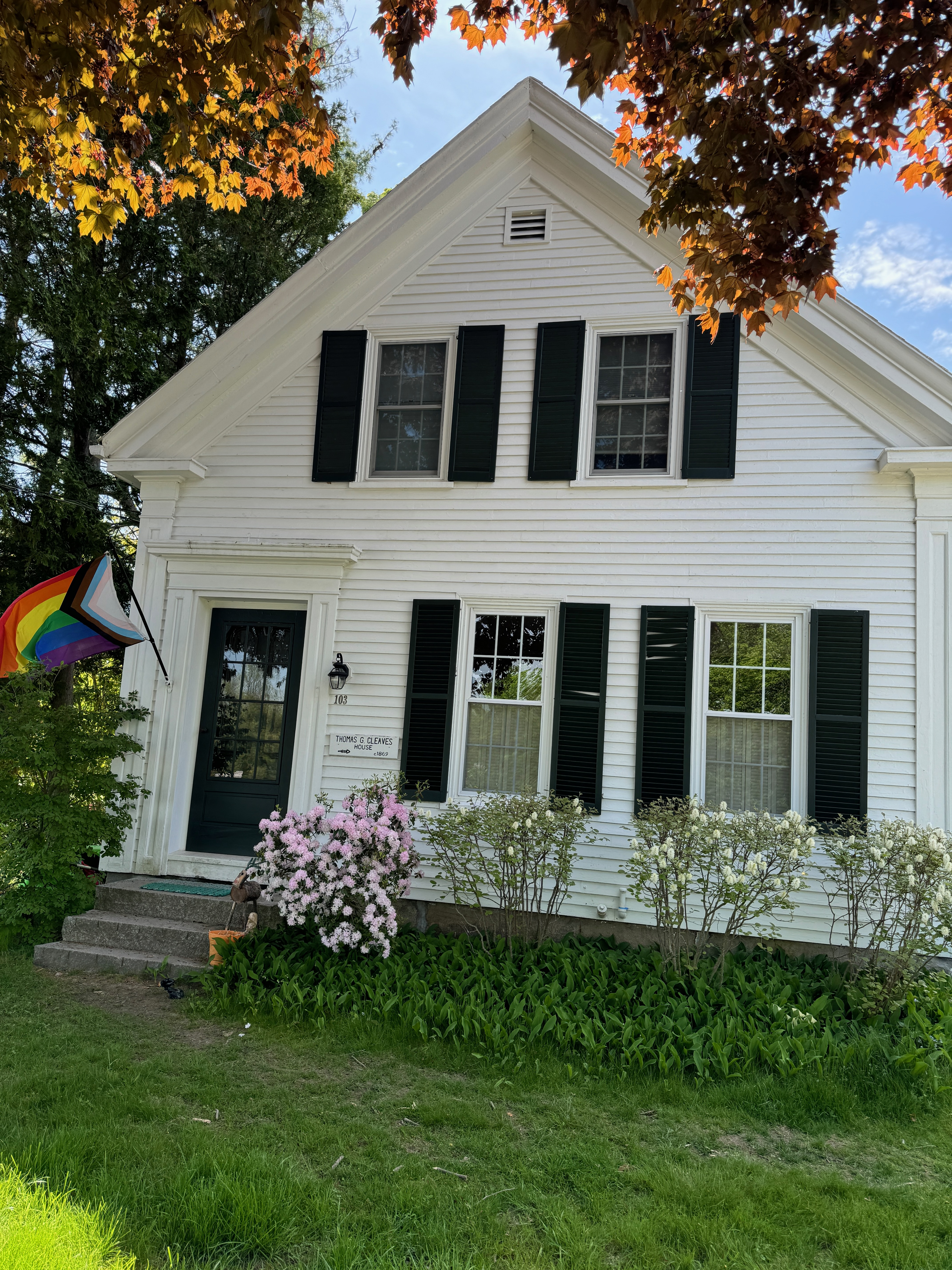
103 East Elm Street

East Elm Street was formerly known as Mill Street and Gooches' Lane, the latter being a family of mill owners who lived and worked there, beside the Fourth Falls. The pottery of the noted Nathaniel Foster was located on Gooches' Lane.

By 1847, Portland Street was in full swing, including the Elm Street offshoot that headed directly into the Upper Village. Main Street was, by now, well established.

James Smith lived in the 1801-built number 15.

Andrew Haven and James J. Humphrey lived at number 27, built in 1835. It is a "well-preserved historic duplex with matching attached barn. Retains extensive original historic fabric and all aspects of integrity. Attached, gable-front barn with original windows, clapboards retains all aspects of integrity."

The 1849 Nathaniel Gooch House stands at 30 East Elm.

Joel Brooks' pottery, which was located at today's 40 East Elm Street, was in business between 1851 and 1888. Brooks succeeded Nathaniel Foster as the Yarmouth's potter.

43, 60 and 75 were found to be well-preserved examples of Queen Anne-style residences.

Number 53, "an early-19th century vernacular house, retains windows, door surround, clapboard siding, and overall form."

Across the street, Abner True lived in the cape at number 54 around 1797.

92 East Elm Street was formerly a mill workers’ boarding house, then a maternity hospital.

Built in 1869, 103 East Elm Street was the home of Thomas G. Cleaves, son of shoemaker Tristram Gilman Cleaves.

== Points of interest ==
Two town parks are located on Elm Street: Latchstring Park (the former site of Mitchell's tavern), on the northern side of West Elm Street at the intersection with West Main Street, and Royal River Park, on the southern side of East Elm Street. The Barker Preserve conservation land, meanwhile, is located between East Elm Street and the Royal River on the northern side of the street.

Yarmouth Junction is located just off East Elm Street on Depot Road. The Amtrak Downeaster crosses East Elm Street several times a day during its journeys between Brunswick and Boston, Massachusetts.
