= Presumpscot Falls Bridge =

Bridge in Falmouth, Maine, U.S.

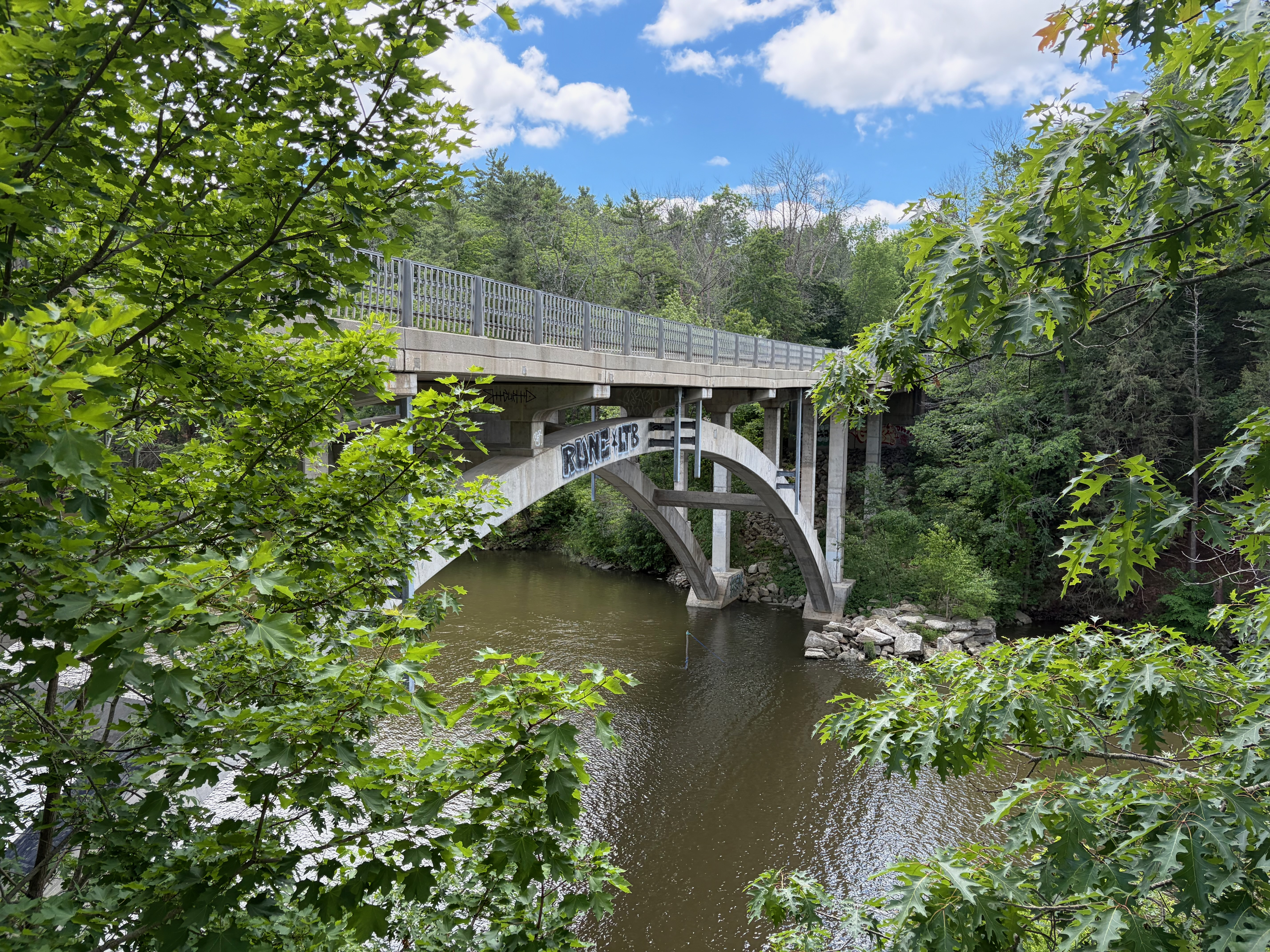
- Coordinates: 43.71690°N 70.26449°W
- Carries: Allen Avenue Extension
- Crosses: Presumpscot River
- Locale: Falmouth, Maine, U.S.

Characteristics
- Design: Open spandrel
- Width: 34 feet (10 m)
- No. of spans: 1

History
- Constructed by: Sanders Construction Company
- Opened: 1913 (113 years ago)

Location
- Interactive map of Presumpscot Falls Bridge

The Presumpscot Falls Bridge, in Falmouth, Maine, United States, spans the Presumpscot River. It carries the traffic of Allen Avenue Extension. An open spandrel design, the bridge was completed in 1913 by Sanders Construction Company. It was, at the time of its opening, the longest single cement span in the state. It is one of Maine's two open spandrel concrete arch bridges, the other being Chisholm Park Bridge in Rumford.

The bridge underwent a large redevelopment in 1994, but the original aspects of the bridge were kept.

As of 2020, the bridge, which is 34 feet (10 m) wide, carries around 7,500 vehicles daily.

Presumpscot Falls Park and Walton Park are located on the northern side of the bridge, on its western and eastern side, respectively.

The bridge is one of four appearing in quick succession as the river proceeds downstream, the other three being that which carries Middle Road (Maine State Route 9), a bridge carrying the Pan Am Railway and the Ryan Quirion Guthrie Bridge, which carries Interstate 295.

== History ==
Grist mills formerly stood beside river here from 1657.
