= Nathaniel Foster (potter) =

American potter

- Born: 1781; Massachusetts, U.S.
- Died: December 27, 1853 (aged 71–72); Yarmouth, Maine, U.S.
- Spouse: Rebecca Swasey (1804–1853; his death)

Nathaniel Foster (1781 – December 27, 1853) was a 19th-century American potter and merchant.

== Life and career ==
Foster was born in Massachusetts in 1781. He moved north to coastal North Yarmouth, Maine (now Yarmouth), where he established a pottery business on Gooches' Lane (today's East Elm Street).

In 1804, he married Rebecca Swasey, with whom he had twelve known children, including daughters Diantha Heald (in 1809) and Mary (1807). Mary died in 1823, aged fifteen or sixteen; Diantha died in 1852, aged 42 or 43. She married John Corliss, another potter, in 1831.

The family lived at 14 Baptist Street (today's Church Street). Foster helped lay out the adjacent Baker Street around 1848.

== Death ==
Foster died on December 27, 1853, aged 71 or 72. He is interred in Yarmouth's Old Baptist Cemetery, alongside his wife, who survived him by 22 years. She died in 1875, aged 90.

Foster's sons, Benjamin and William, who were his assistants, ran the pottery after their father's death. The building housing his pottery was torn down in 1891.

Joel Brooks later succeeded Foster as Yarmouth's potter. He lived on Gooches' Lane, near Foster's pottery.
