= Main Street (Yarmouth, Maine) =

Prominent street in Yarmouth, Maine

Coordinates: 43.80104°N 70.18784°W

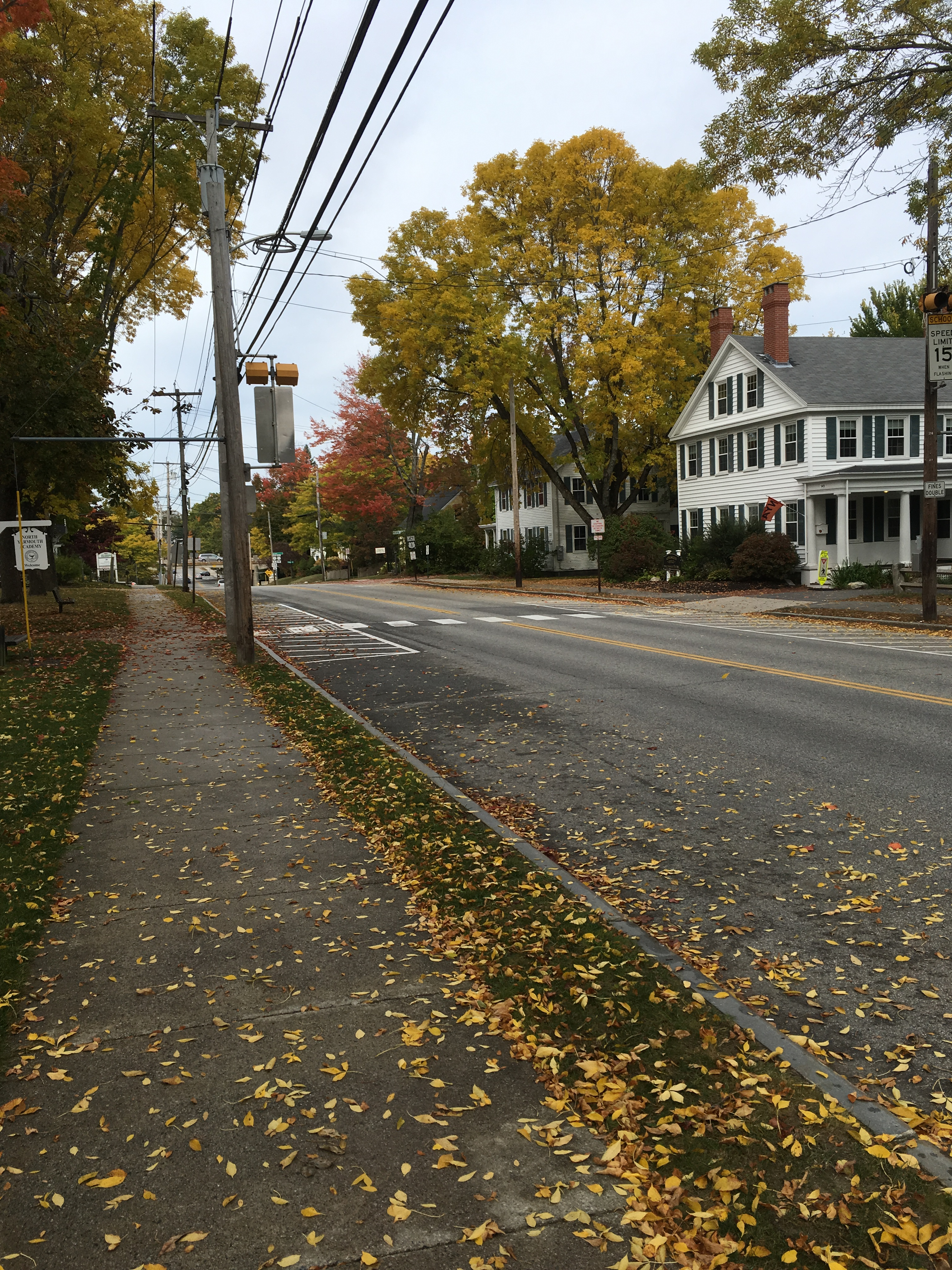
- A 2016 view of Main Street across from its intersection with Bridge Street, looking west toward the North Yarmouth Academy campus and, beyond, Brickyard Hollow
- Interactive map of Main Street
- Part of: SR 115
- Length: 2.2 mi (3.5 km)
- Location: Yarmouth, Maine, U.S.
- Eastern end: Granite Street, Yarmouth
- Western end: Walnut Hill Road, North Yarmouth

Main Street is a historic street in Yarmouth, Maine, United States. It is part of the 18-mile-long (29 km) State Route 115 (SR 115), the eastern terminus of which is in Yarmouth at the intersection of Marina Road and Lafayette Street (SR 88), at Yarmouth Harbor in the town's Lower Falls neighborhood. Main Street's western terminus is a merging with Walnut Hill Road in North Yarmouth, at which point SR 115 continues west. There are three distinct sections of Main Street (from east to west): Lower Falls, Brickyard Hollow and Upper Village.

As it crosses Elm Street, Main Street continues as West Main Street into North Yarmouth. It is East Main Street, meanwhile, from Lower Falls to Granite Street, two miles (3.2 km) to the north. Between Lower Falls and Upper Village, Main Street is about 2.2 miles (3.5 km) long and sits about 90 feet (27 m) above sea level.

The annual Yarmouth Clam Festival attracts around 120,000 people (around fourteen times the town's population) over the course of the three-day weekend and is centered on Main Street.

In 2022, the town began seeking feedback on a streetscape plan for the intersection of Main Street and Railroad Square, as part of the larger Main Street Sidewalk and Streetscape Master Plan and Design Recommendations program.

== Architecture ==
=== Lower Falls ===
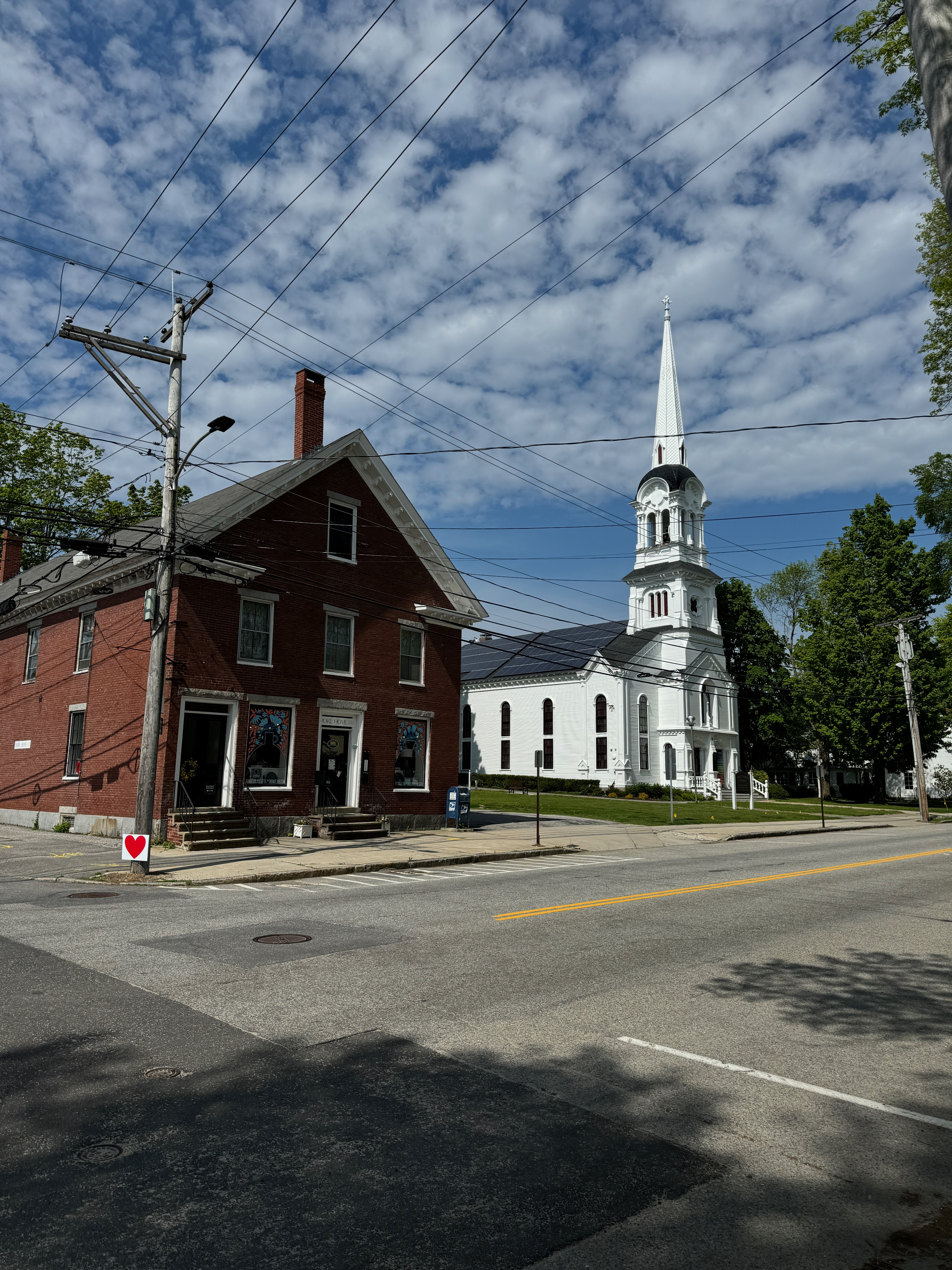
Rufus York's general store in the 1860s and 1870s, this brick building, at 108 Main Street, is now home to Fiore

Lower Falls is the colloquial name for the eastern end of Main Street, and part of East Main Street, centered around Main Street's intersection with Portland Street. It is also known as Falls Village or The Falls.

=== Brickyard Hollow ===
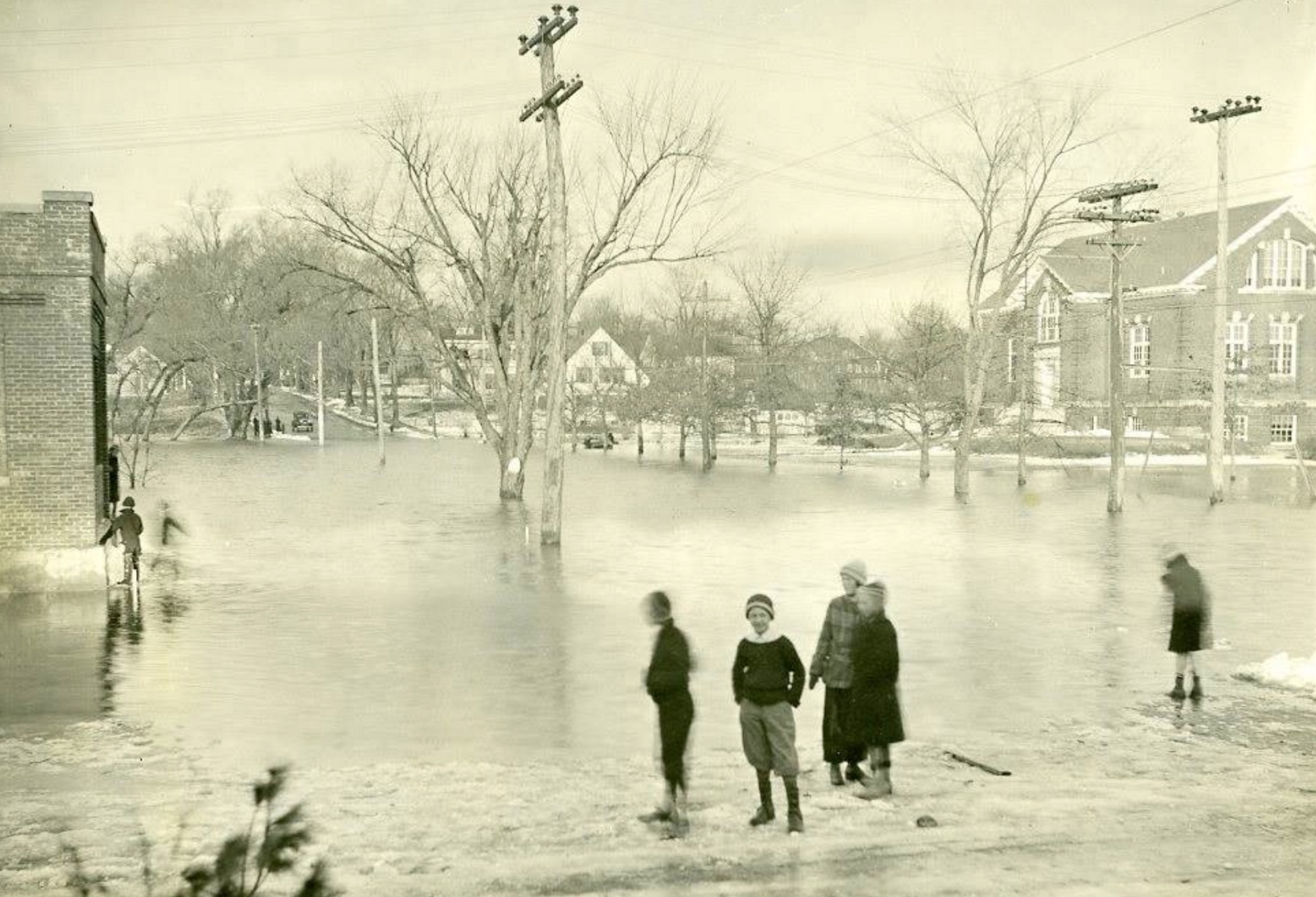
Brickyard Hollow, before it was filled in. Photo taken from where the Route 1 overpass is today, looking northwest to the School Street intersection

The section of town between the Upper Village and Lower Falls is known as Brickyard Hollow, named for the brick-making business that was located across the street from the Masonic Hall (now the restaurant Gather) at 189 Main Street, which was built in the 1870s.

=== Upper Village ===
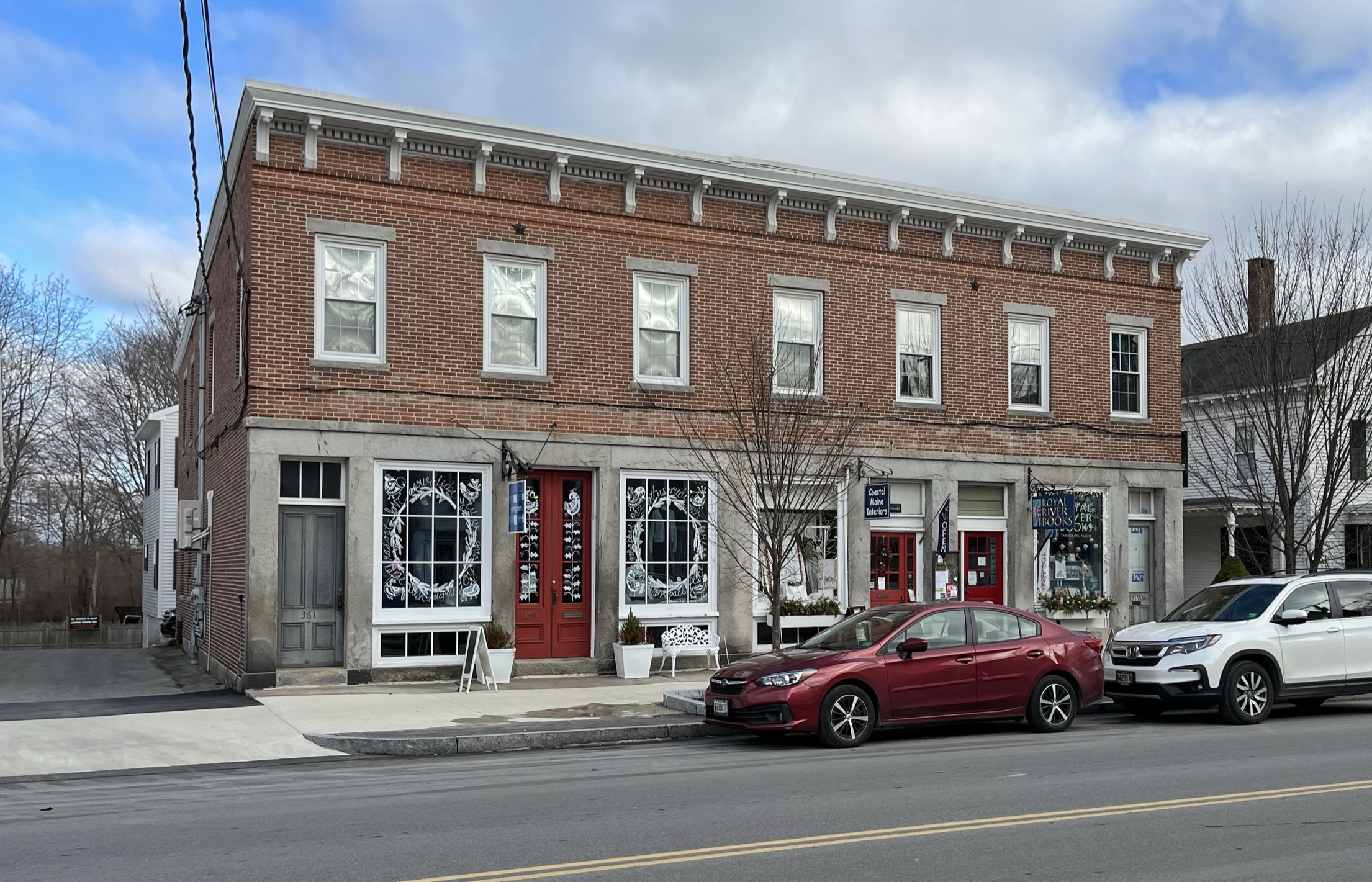
This brick building, built in 1862 by Samuel Fogg and Ansel Loring, used to house (from left to right) Marston's dry goods store and Leone R. Cook's apothecary

The western end of Main Street, centered around its intersection with Elm Street, is known as Upper Village (or the Corner).

=== West Main Street ===
West Main Street (still Route 115) leads into North Yarmouth.

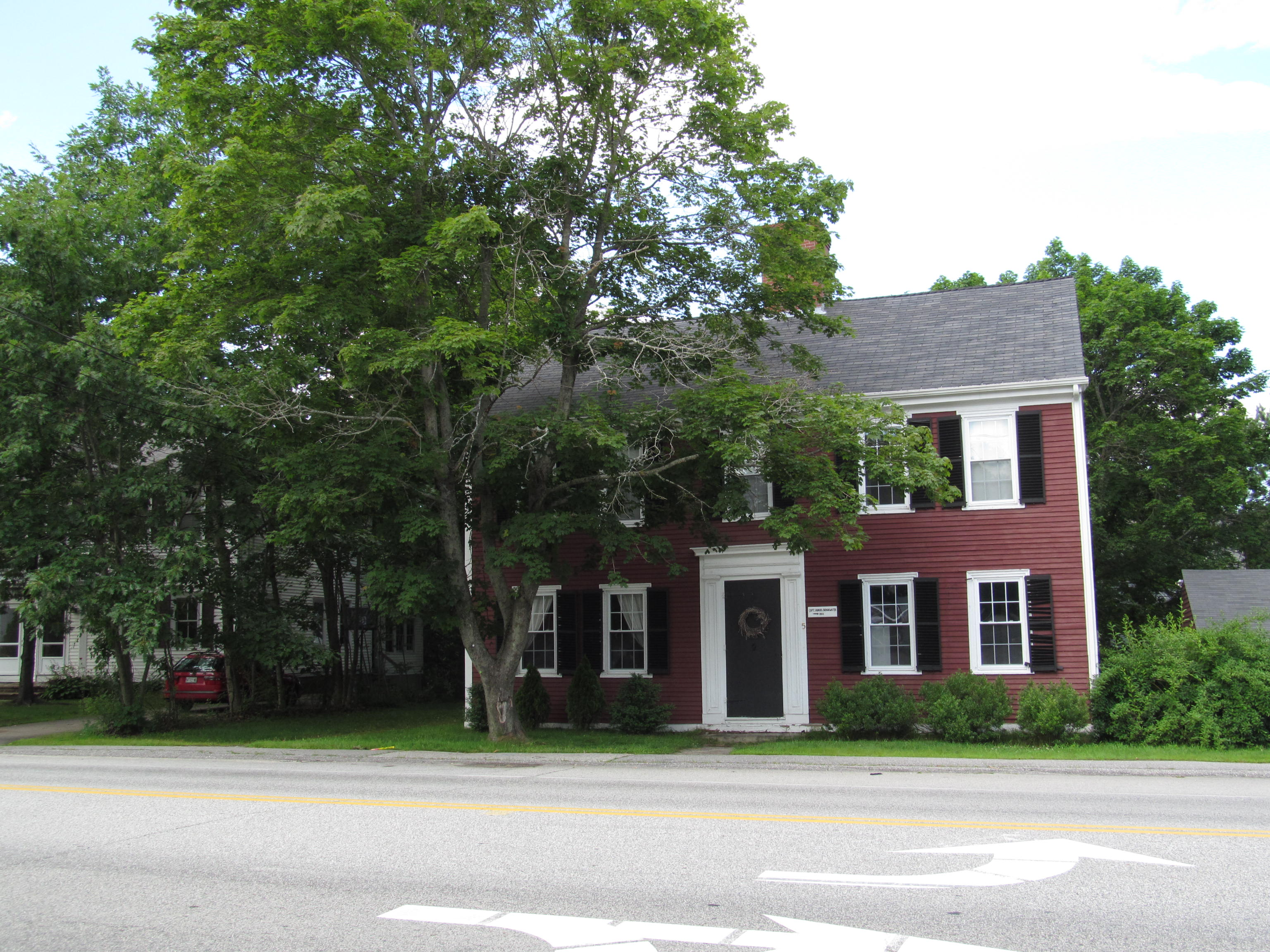
The Samuel Drinkwater House, 5 West Main Street, built in 1803

The original owner of number 5, the first house on the northern side of West Main, was Captain Samuel Drinkwater in 1803. He was captain of the USS Enterprise during the War of 1812. The house later passed to his brother, Captain Joseph Drinkwater.

A hospital, run by Mrs Gilbert, was on the site now occupied by Coastal Manor nursing home at 20 West Main Street. One of the two buildings dates to around 1860; the other around 1835.

A 1973 survey dates number 17, a duplex, to 1807; however, a town assessor says 1860.

27 West Main Street, the Louis P. Pomeroy House, is circa 1890. In 2009, the owner found a shingle signed by Mr. Pomeroy confirming he was the home's builder (additional marking discovered in 2020 on the house front with date May 25, 1889), John Calvin Stevens and Albert Winslow Cobb are confirmed architects via house plans on file at Yarmouth Historical Society. Mr. Pomeroy grew up across the street and eventually built the house. He is also credited with several other projects, including the original Town Hall and schools and Main Street Baptist church.

The cape at number 43 was built for yeoman Matthias Storer around 1802.

The Alexander Mills House, at number 54, is circa 1796.

Cyrus Kingsley lived at number 57 around 1865.

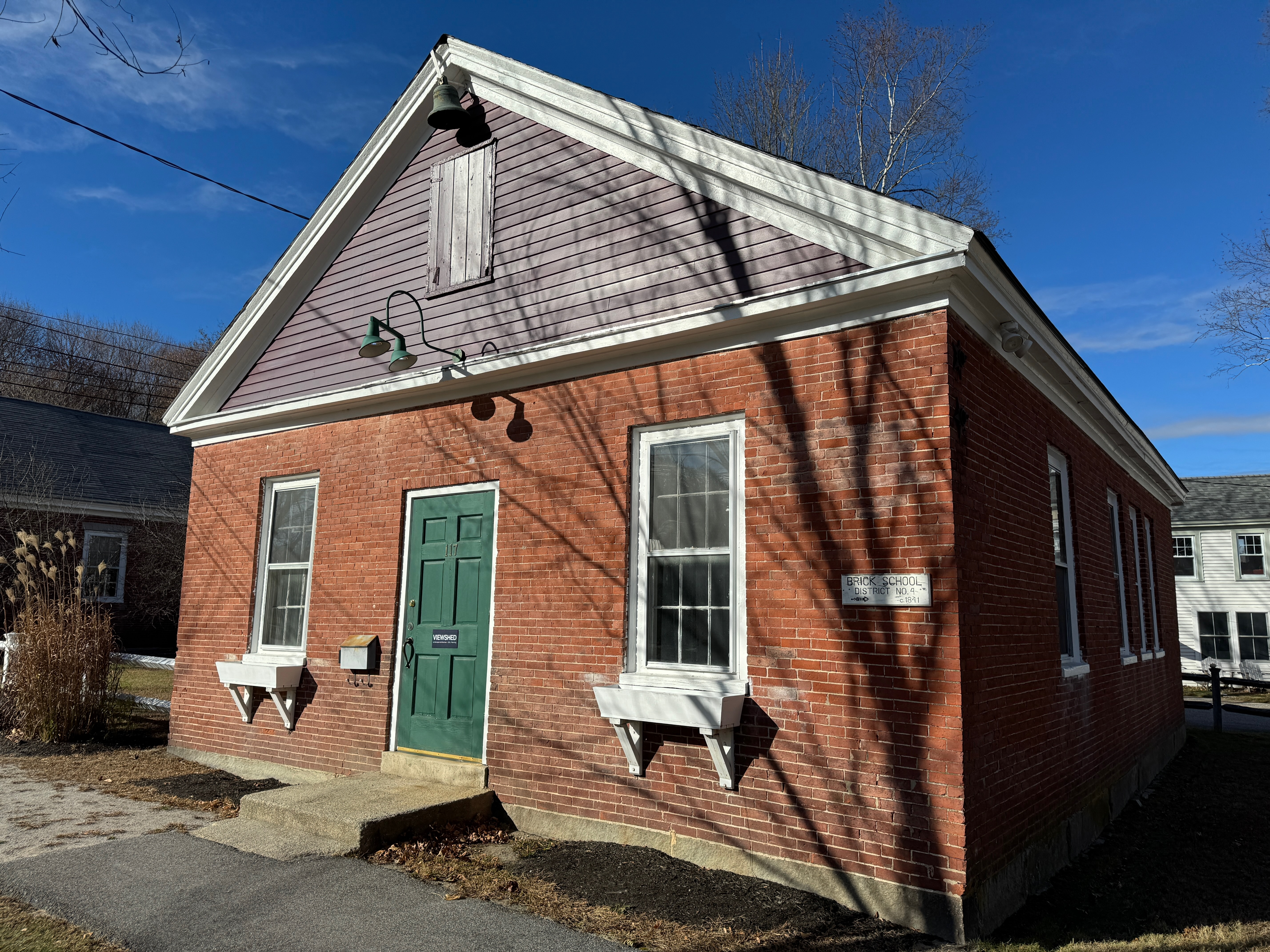
117 West Main Street

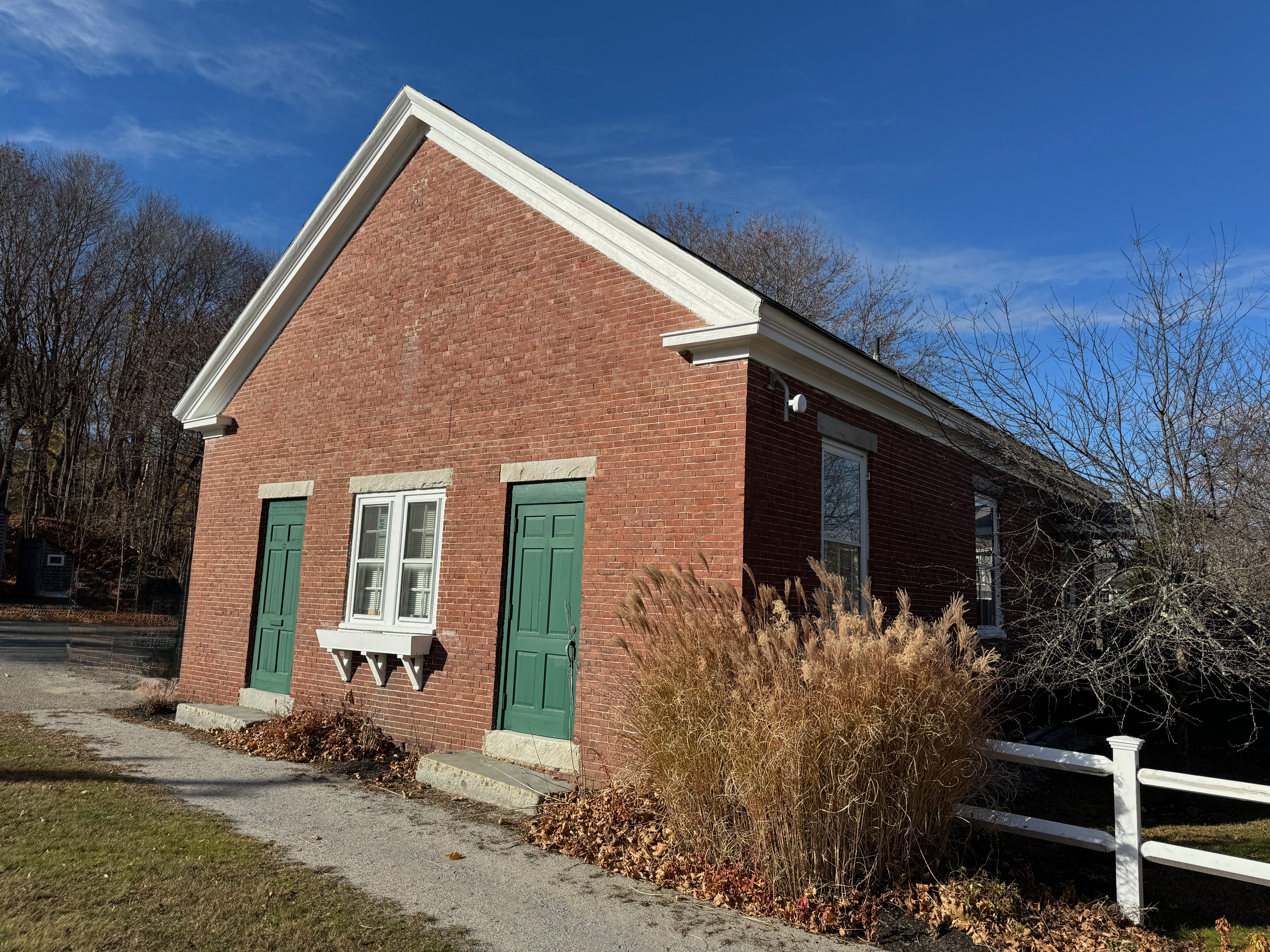
121 West Main Street

A 1973 survey suggests number 60 was built in 1790.

65 West Main Street originates from around 1800.

Deacon Jacob Mitchell lived at number 89. It was later owned by Henry Barbour, who operated a dairy farm.

There are two brick schools at 117 and 121 West Main, just beyond the Sligo Road intersection. The first, the District Number 4 school, was built around 1841 and repaired in the 1890s. In 1847, teacher William Osgood had 74 students; as such, a second school was built beside the original soon after. The second building was likely built around 1856. Both schools closed in 1992, when Harrison Middle School opened.

A large wooden building located at the intersection of West Main Street and Sligo Road, next to the old brick schools, served as the town hall between 1833 and 1910. It was here that the 1849 debates took place that led to Yarmouth's secession from North Yarmouth.

124 West Main Street, which is turned sideways to the road, dates to 1810.

William M. R. Lunt was the original owner of number 139, circa 1856.

Number 154, at the eastern corner of Bates Street, dates to around 1880.

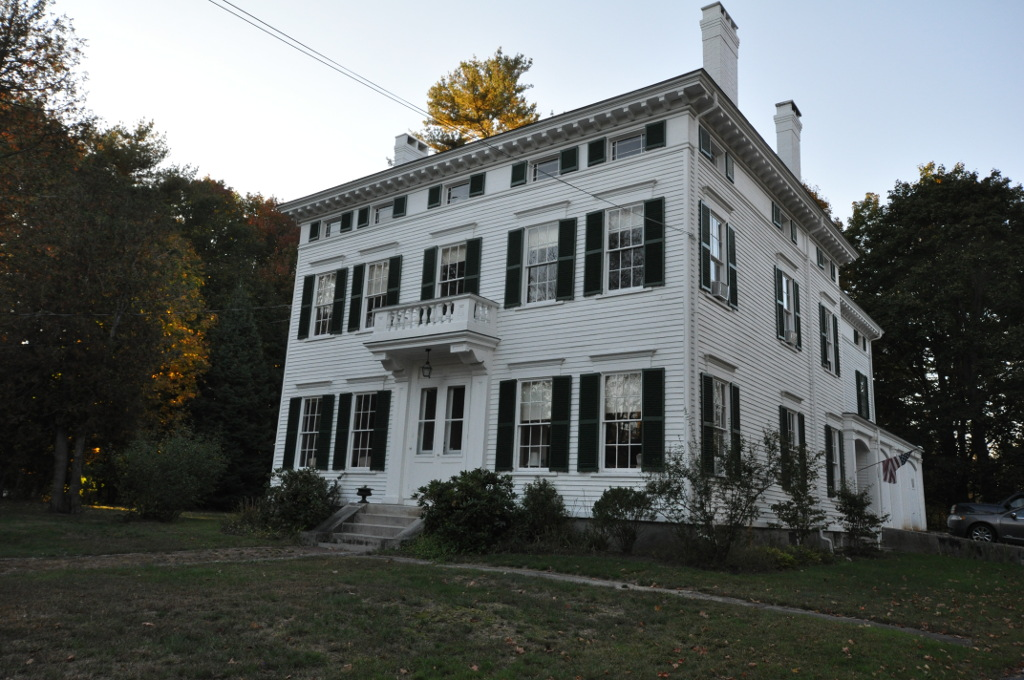
Captain Reuben Merrill House, 233 West Main Street

John Cutter, yeoman and grandson of Ammi, was the original occupant of number 163, circa 1795. The house sits at the top of a small hill.

190 West Main, a cape, dates to the early 19th century.

A 1973 survey indicates number 195 was constructed in the 1870s.

233 West Main Street is an imposing three-storey, fifteen-room Italianate mansion that was built for ship captain Reuben Merrill (1818–1875) in 1858. The home is one of three known surviving works of Portland architect Thomas J. Sparrow. It was built by John Dunham, a local master builder. In 2011, the Merrill family leased the home to Maine Preservation, a historic preservation organization.

At the eastern corner of the intersection with Fieldstone Drive, number 284, stands a circa-1792 cape. Formerly the home of Nathan Safford.
