= Lower Falls (Yarmouth, Maine) =

Neighborhood in Yarmouth, Maine, United States)

Lower Falls Falls Village The Falls
- Neighborhood
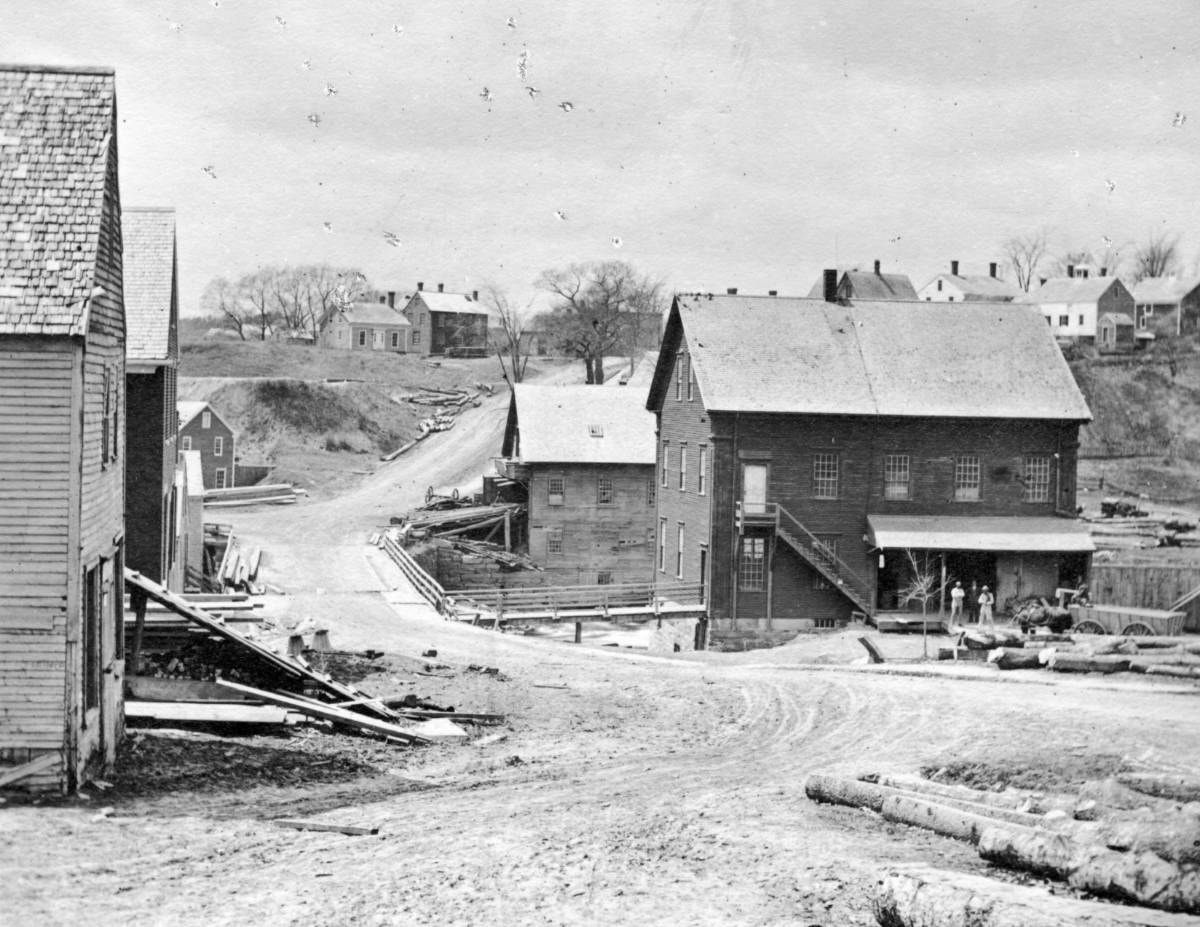
- A late-19th-century view west from near today's Grist Mill Park. Staples Hill is in the background
- Interactive map of Lower Falls
- Country: United States
- State: Maine
- County: Cumberland
- Towns: Yarmouth
- Time zone: UTC-5 (Eastern (EST))
  - Summer (DST): UTC-4 (EDT)

Lower Falls is the colloquial name for the eastern end of Main Street, and part of East Main Street, in Yarmouth, Maine, centered around Main Street's intersection with Portland Street. It is also known as Falls Village or The Falls.

== East Main Street ==
East Main Street, part of Maine State Route 88, crosses the East Main Street Bridge at the First Falls and has been a route to the northeastern part of Yarmouth (and into Freeport) since the founding of the town.

Henry Bailey Hitchcock lived at 30 East Main Street, built in 1870.

35 East Main Street was built in 1848. Its brick basement was once used as a store by Nathan Oakes and Daniel Mitchell. Shipbuilder Jeremiah Baker lived here between 1857 and around 1871.

38 East Main Street was built by shipbuilder Albion Seabury in 1844. Directly opposite, number 43 was originally owned by Johnathan True in 1780, a clothier who owned a store at Lower Falls. It was later associated with Dr. David Jones and David Pratt, one of Yarmouth's earliest shipbuilders.

Number 49, built in 1779, was moved here in 1817 by Major Daniel Mitchell and later expanded by Daniel L. Mitchell. As of 2018, the nine-over-six windows, entry door and surround, trim and siding are all original.

51 East Main Street was built in 1810 and was once the home of William Stockbridge, a prominent merchant, ship owner and town treasurer. After Stockbridge's death in 1850, many of the facilities he owned in the area were sold. These included his home, his wharf, shipyard and a large parcel of riverside land. His former home was operated as the main building of the Royal River Cabins until the 1940s.

Number 56 was built, likely by clockmaker Lebbeus Bailey (1763–1827), in 1792. It was also associated with Albion Seabury. Next door, at 64 East Main, is a home built by Augustus True in 1865.

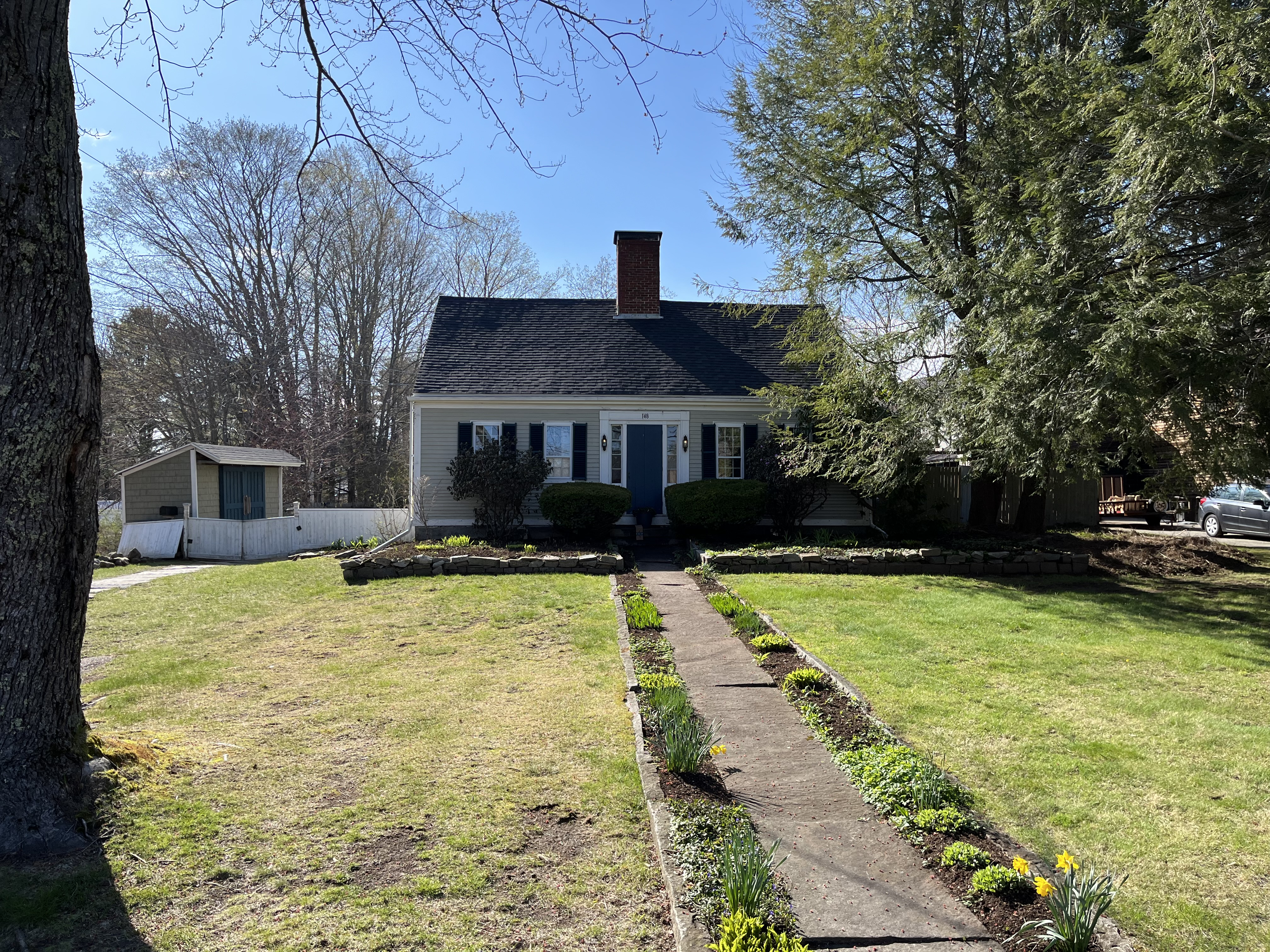
148 East Main Street, built in 1810

Known locally as Stockbridge Hall, number 68, at the corner of East Main and Yankee Drive, was built around 1725.

Close to the East Main and Spring Street split, number 96 was likely built by Samuel Buxton and later occupied by Nathaniel True.

100 East Main Street was built in 1810. Around twenty years later it became Asa Bisbee's blacksmith shop. Next door, number 112, was built by Jacob Jones around 1818.

Just beyond the junction with Willow Street stands number 129, which was built by Madison Northey around 1865.

Samuel Kinney lived at number 148 around 1813. It was built in 1810.

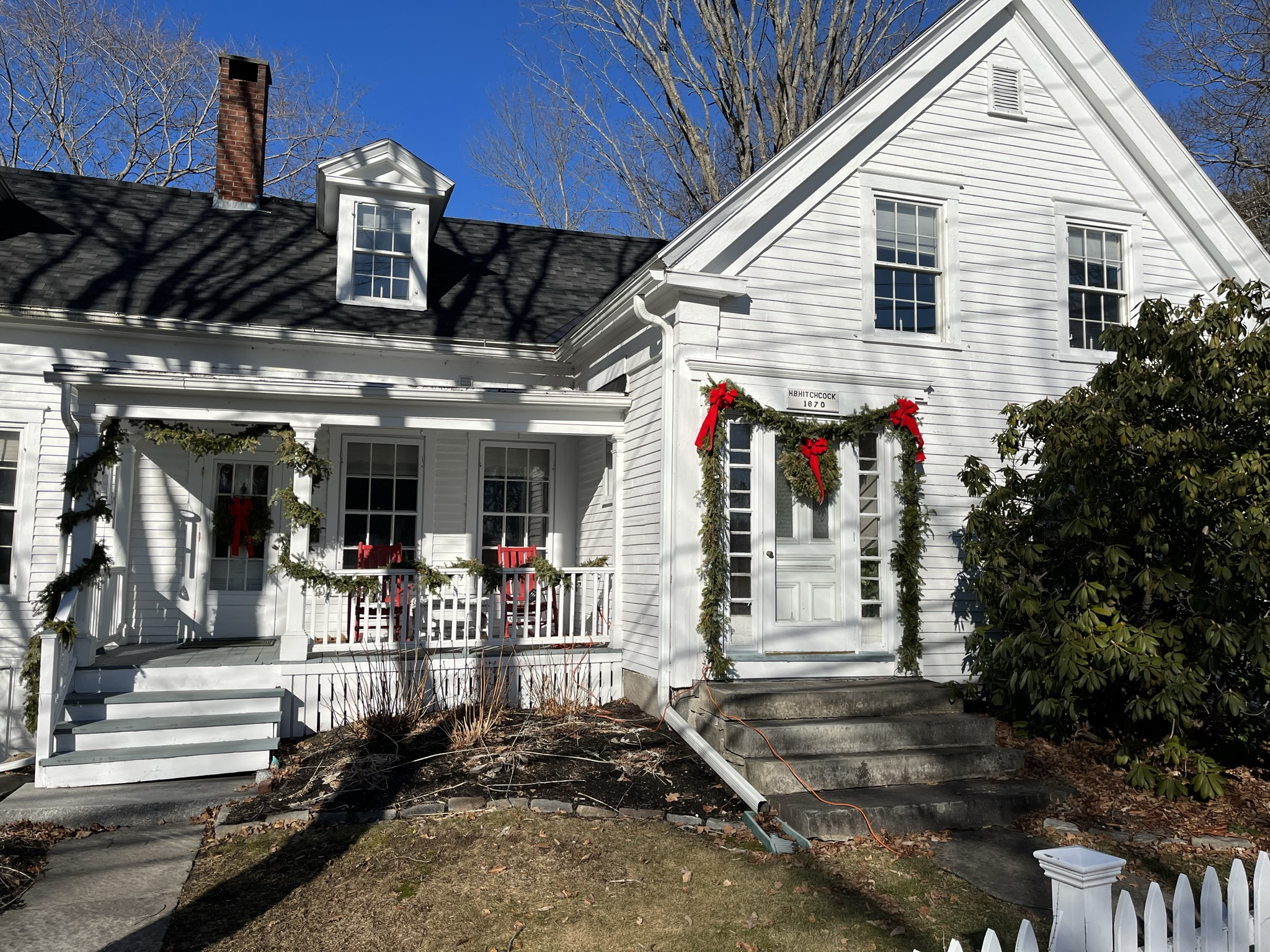
Henry Bailey Hitchcock built today's 30 East Main Street in 1870

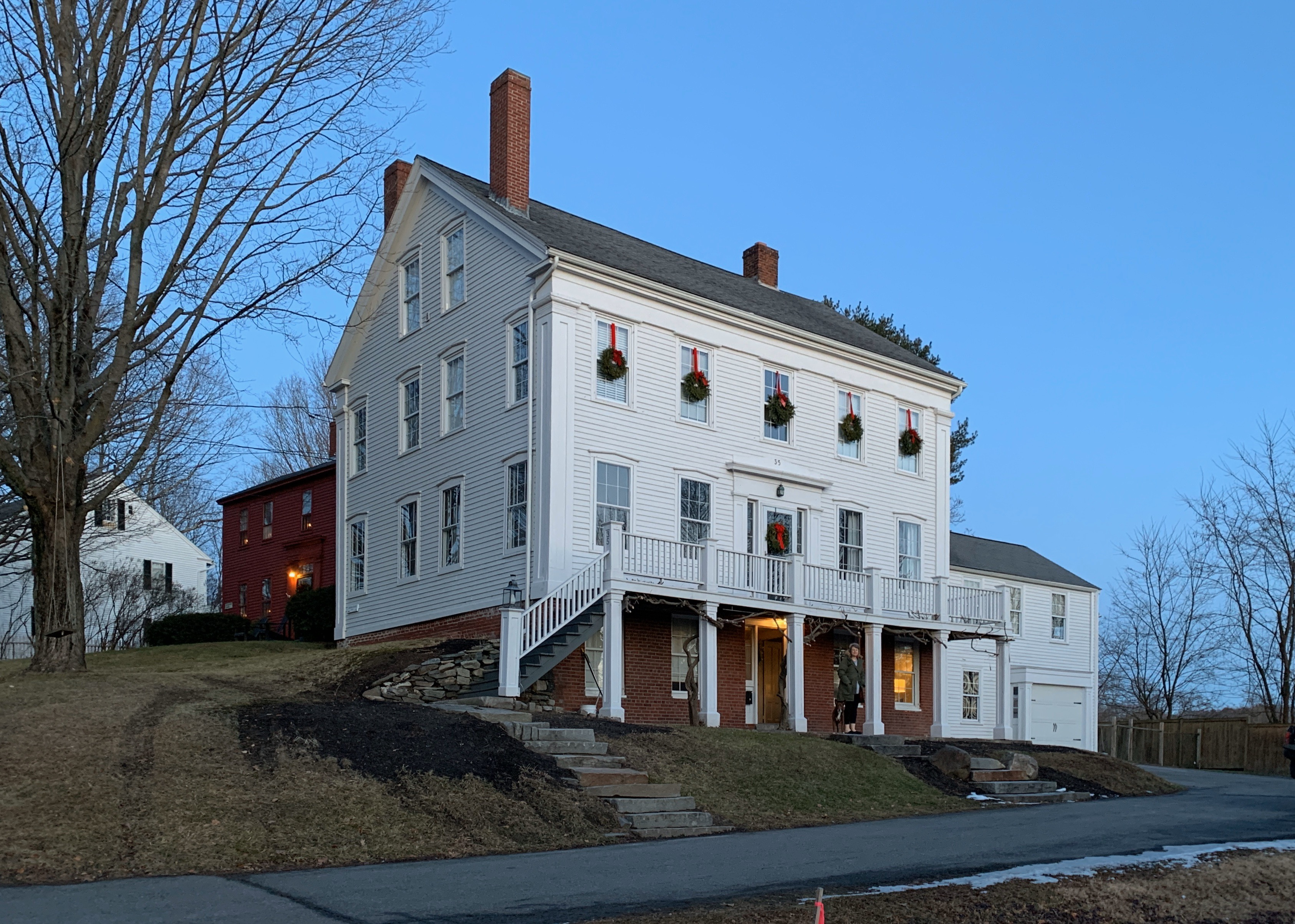
35 East Main Street, built in 1848. Behind it is number 43, which dates from 1780

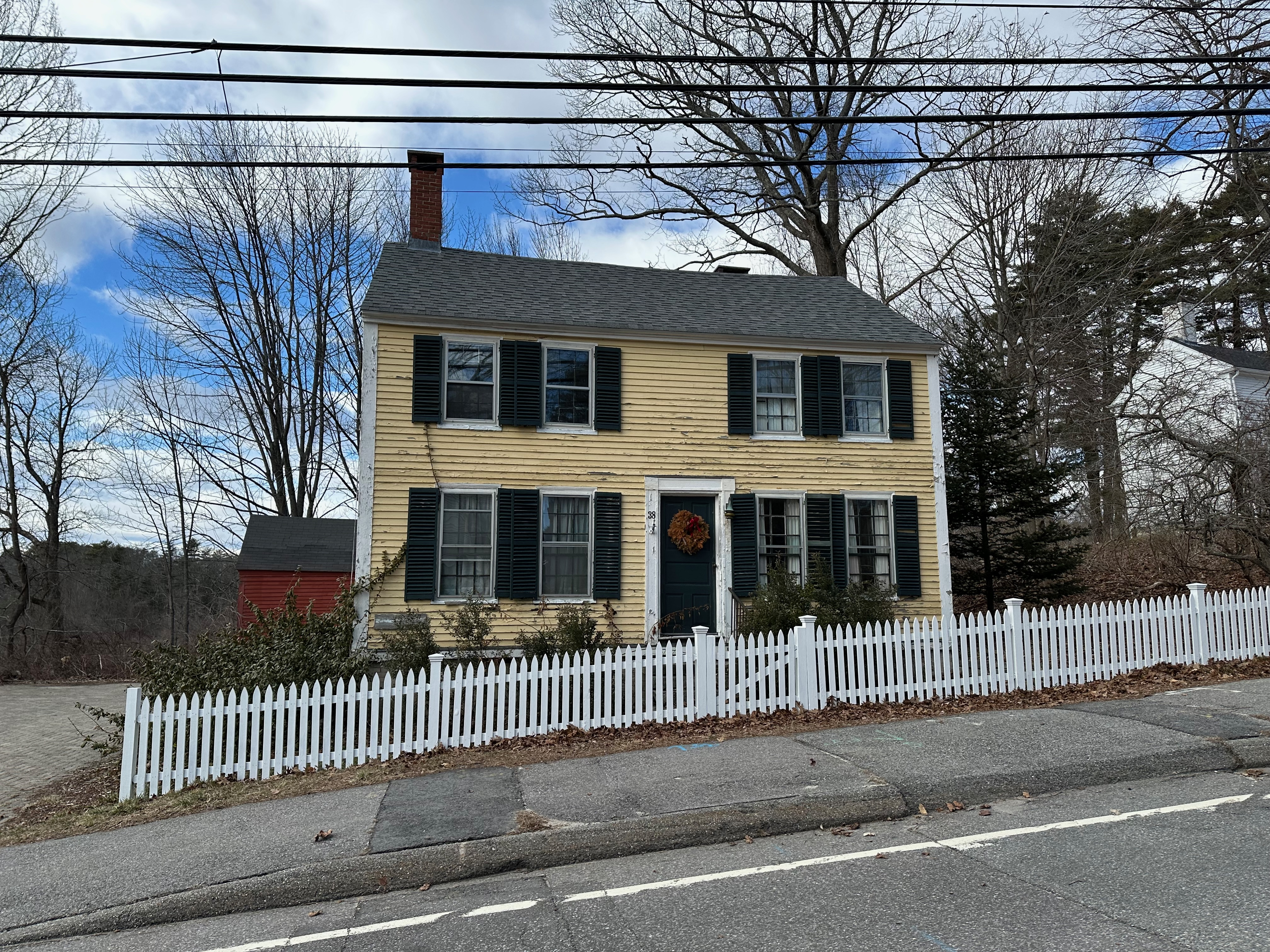
38 East Main Street, originally the home of shipbuilder Albion Seabury

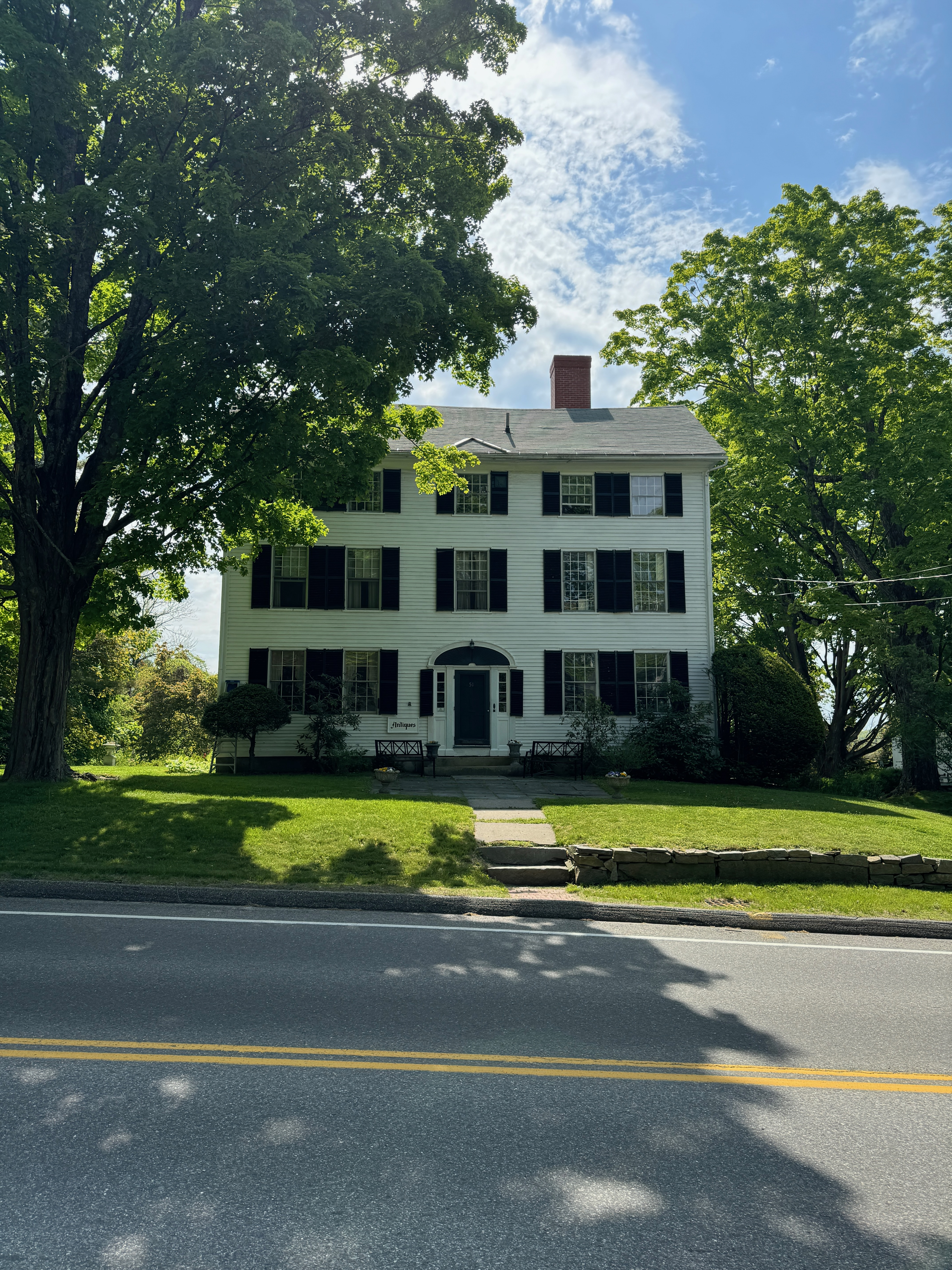
The three-storey 51 East Main Street, built in 1810. General Lafayette once stayed here

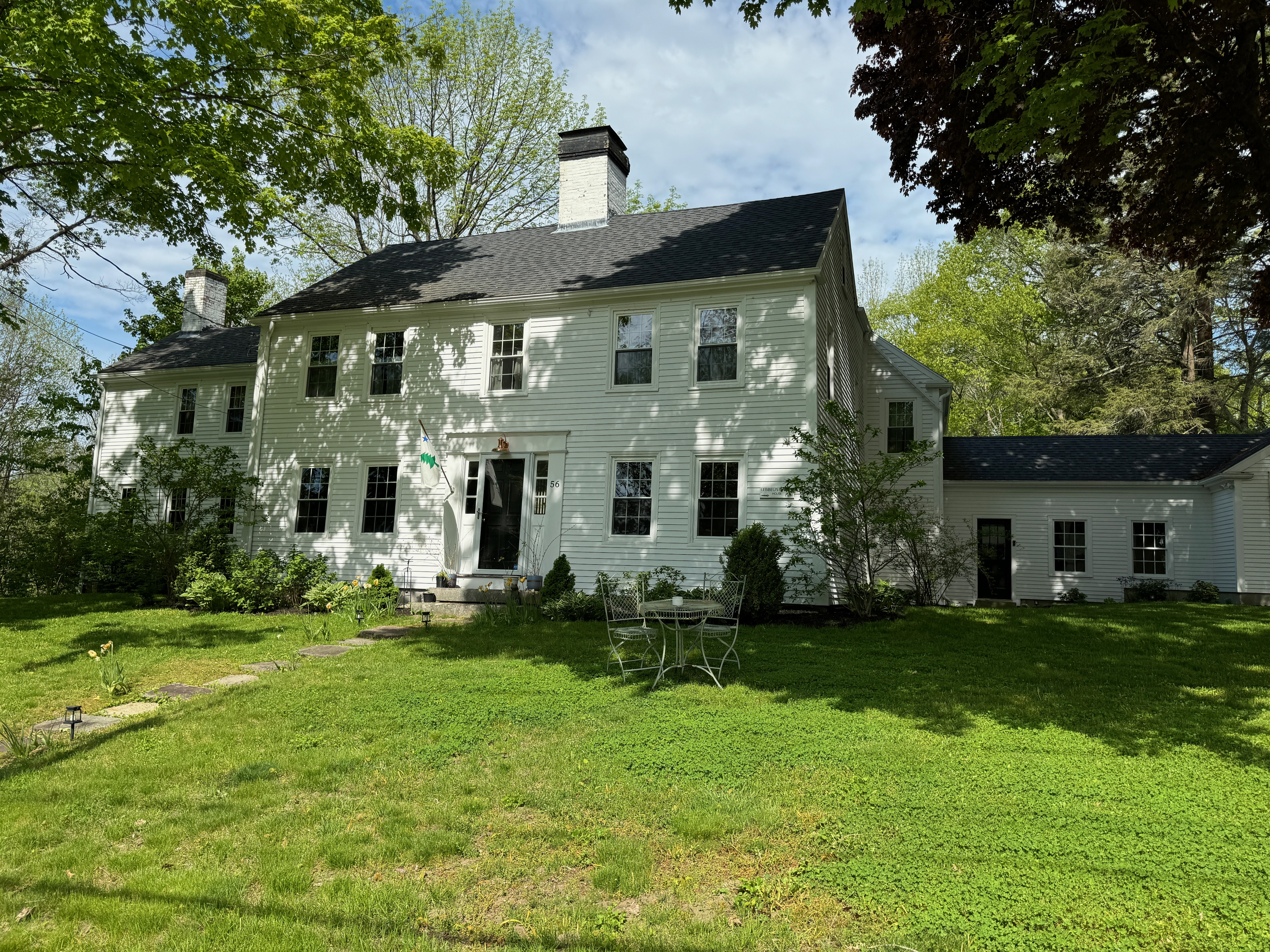
The Lebbeus Bailey House, 56 East Main Street

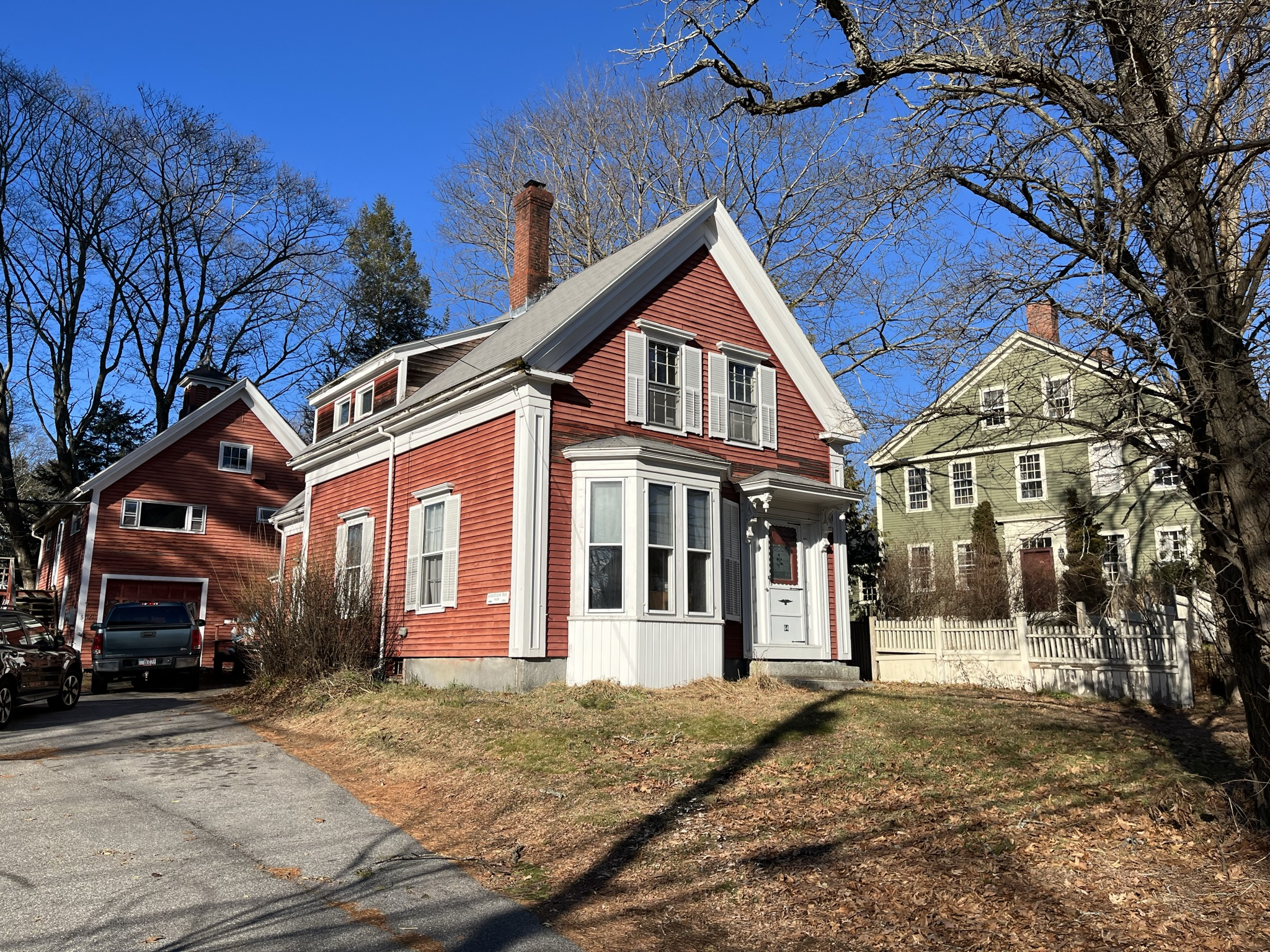
64 East Main Street, the Augustus True House

== Main Street ==
76 Main Street, built in 1792

19th- and 20th-century homes and business that existed on Main Street are listed below, roughly from east to west.

Beside the First Falls on their western side, 1 Main Street is the former of James Craig's sawmill.

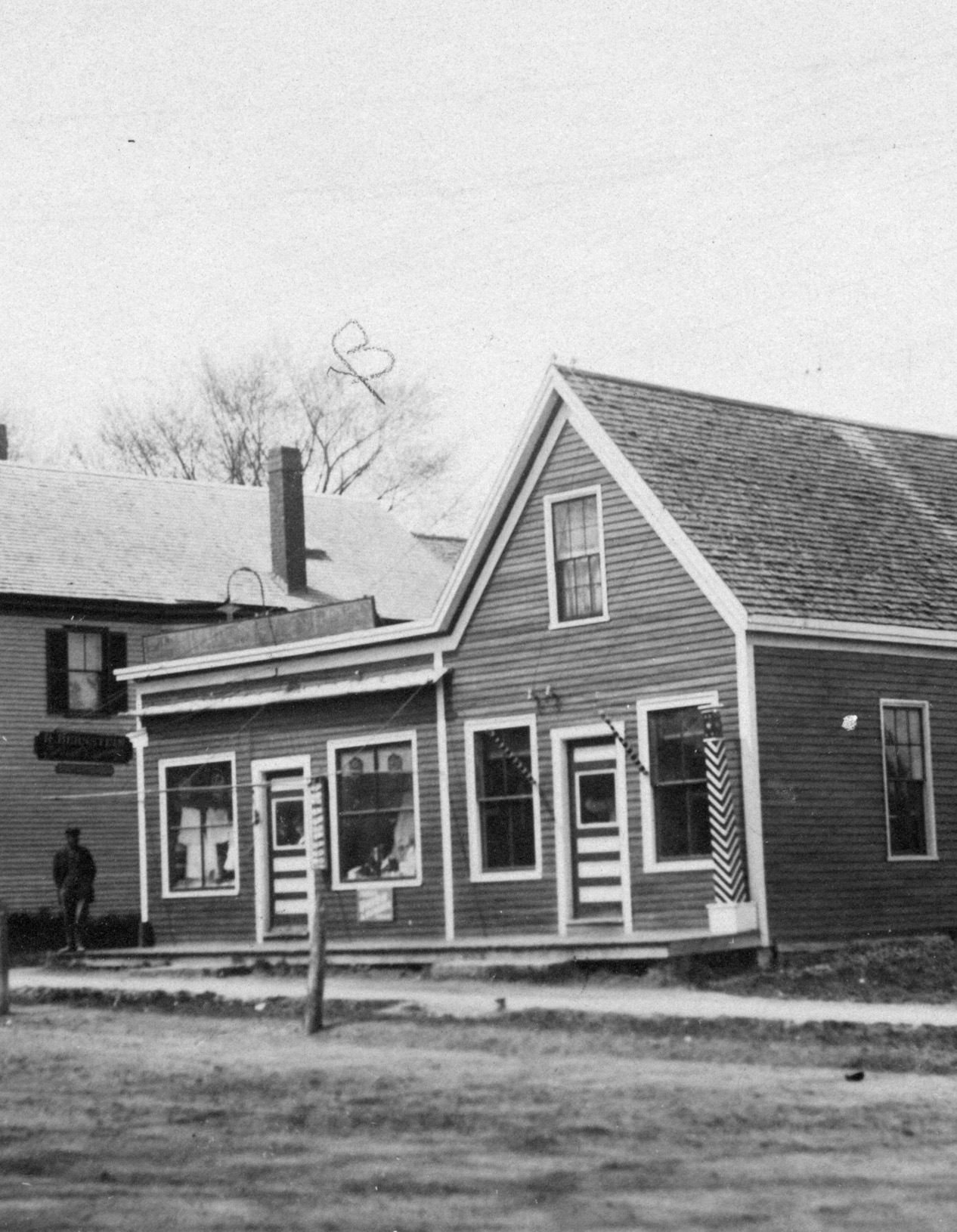
An early barber shop and (in the left side of the same building) what became George Soule's ice cream shop and pool hall. Vining's deli is beside it to the east. This is around where the building at 82 Main Street now stands, just short of Staples Hill, where the Main Street and Marina Road split occurs

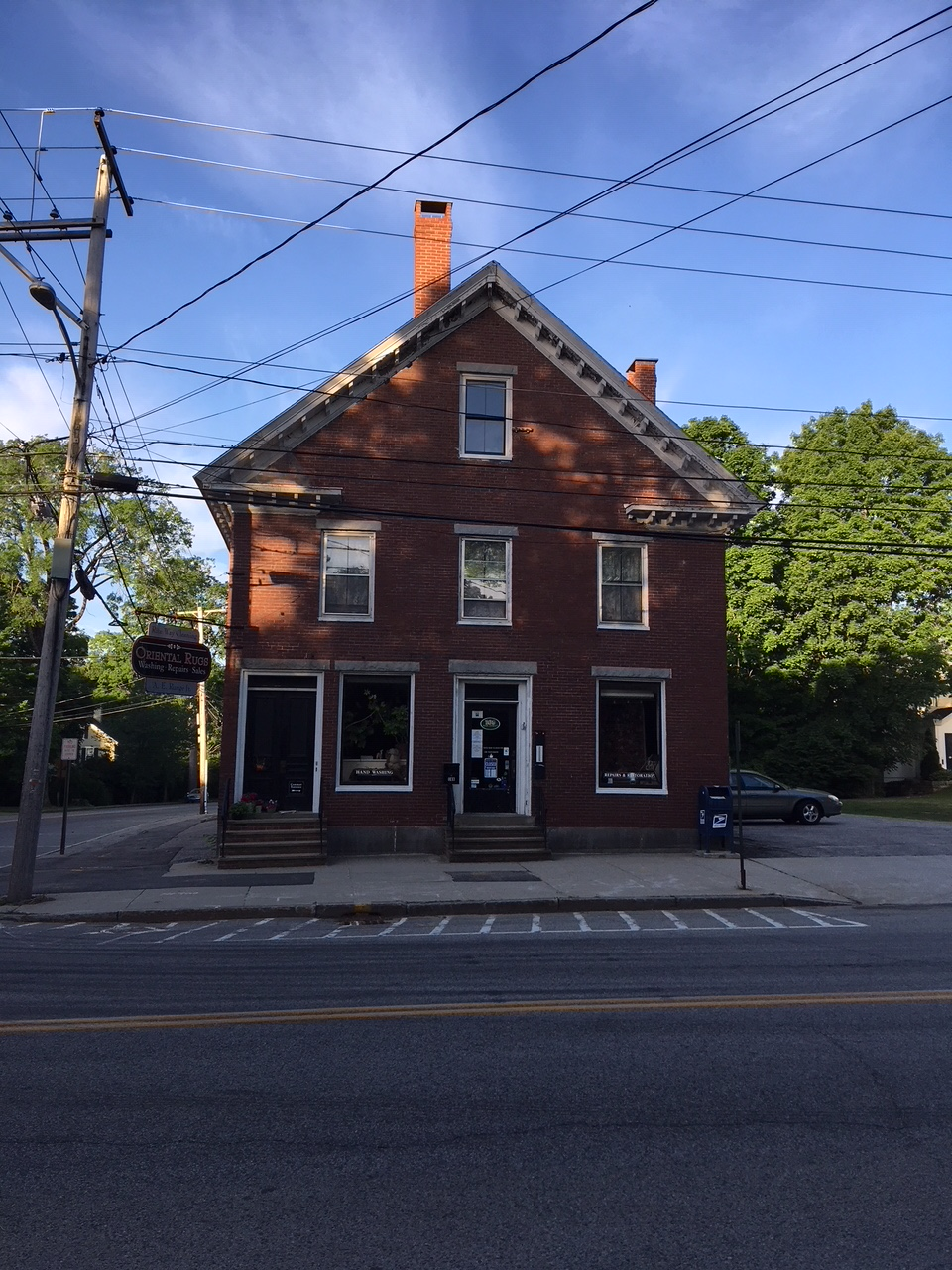
Rufus York's general store in the 1860s and 1870s, this brick building, at 108 Main Street, is now home to FIORE

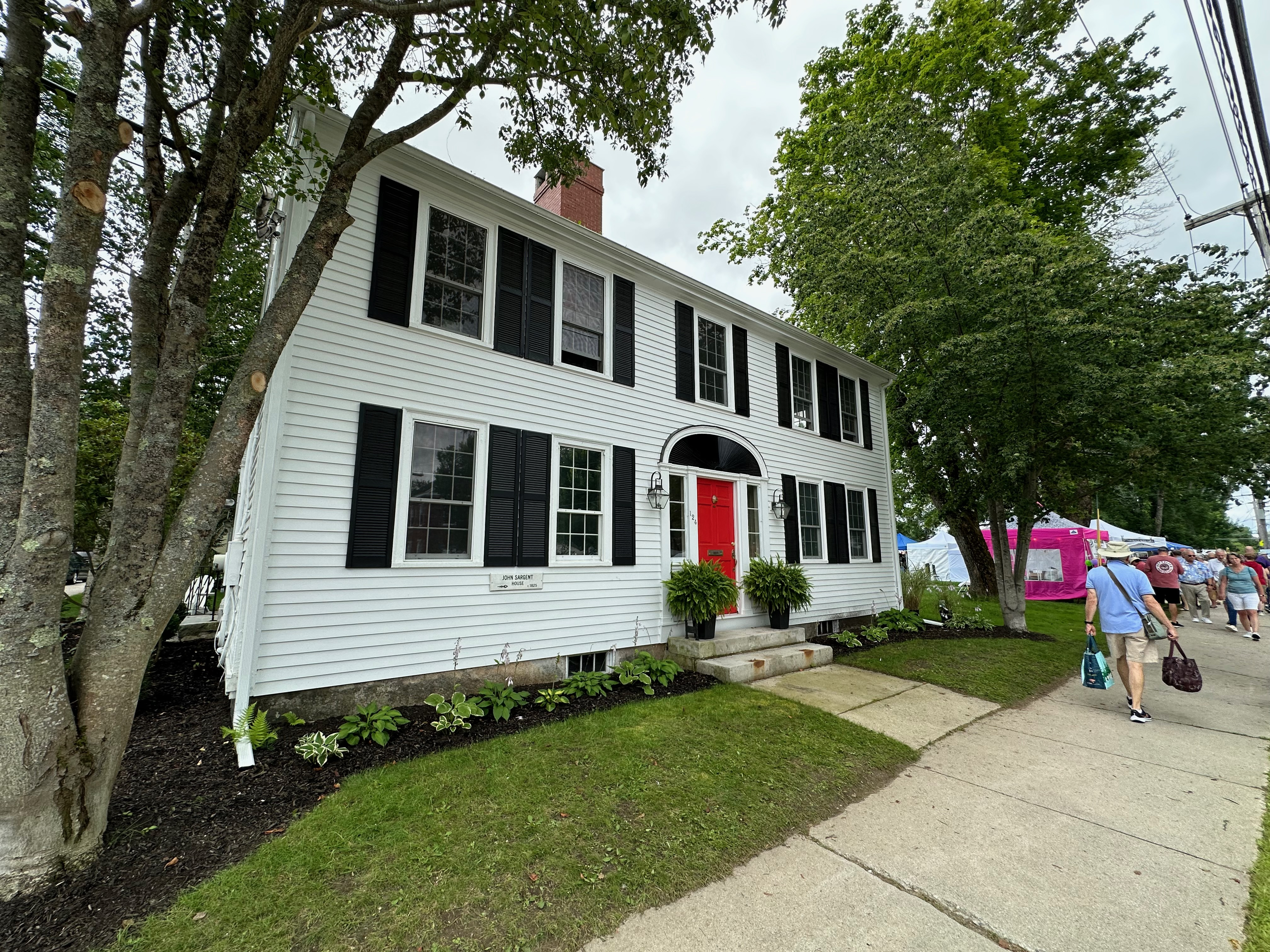
John Sargent House, 124 Main Street

25 Main Street, near the intersection with Grist Mill Lane, dates to around the turn of the 20th century, while just up the hill, 31 Main Street dates to around 1846.

Nicholas Grant built the main building of the since-expanded Greek Revival house at 37 Main Street, on the hill down to the harbor, around 1844.

On the southern side of the street, number 46 dates to around 1880. Next door, number 38 dates to around 1840.

Henry Rowe (1812–1870) was the architect of the pink Gothic Revival house at 49 Main Street, the Alfred Seabury House, which was built in 1845. Rowe also designed The Gothic House in Portland.

50 Main Street, the three-storey old Hose No. 2 at the Main Street and Marina Road split (at the crest of Staples Hill), was built for the fire department around 1889.

Back on the northern side of the street, number 57, the Edward Russell House, was built around 1813. Next door, number 63, was built for Bethiah Staples around 36 years later, in 1849.

76 Main Street, set back from the road, adjacent to Torrey Court, was built in 1792. The home has seven bedrooms, five bathrooms, and sits on 1.6 acres.

73 Main Street, the left elevation of which faces the street, was once the home of Jacob G. Loring.

In the building at 82–84 Main Street was W. N. Richards & Co. (owned by William Richards), established in 1864; in the 1960s, Vining's delicatessen and, beside it to the west, George Soule's ice cream shop (first floor) and pool hall (second floor).

Across the street, the brick building at 85 Main Street currently occupied by Svetlana was erected around 1848.

90 Main Street, built in 1875, was Barbour's hardware store; later Goffs hardware (1969–2015).

Manley E. Bishop's grocery store stood to the east of the present-day Goffs building.

Englishman James Parsons' (1811–1876) grocery store, "a two-story building standing on the lot adjoining that where stood for so many years the little old post office". It was here that "dignified citizens like Doctor James Bates, L.L. Shaw and Barnabas Freeman often assembled for an evening's chat". Parsons came to Yarmouth around 1860 and wed a wealthy local girl. Upon Parsons' death in 1876, his son, Alvarado H. (1848–1915), took over the business.

The post office until around 1905. The first postmaster was Payne Elwell (1744–1820) in 1793. (He lived in the building that is now 162 Main Street, which stands on the former site of the Knights of Pythias Hall, Westcustogo Lodge, No. 33) He was succeeded in 1803 by Samuel P. Russell, David Drinkwater in 1804, John Hale in 1810, Daniel Mitchell in 1816, James C. Hill in 1834, Jacob G. Loring in 1842 and Reuben Cutter in 1845. When the town split occurred, the office name was changed in 1852 to Yarmouth from North Yarmouth. Reuben Cutter resumed the role, and was followed by Otis Briggs Pratt in 1861 and Nicholas Drinkwater in 1866. Lucy V. Groves was appointed in 1868, becoming the first woman named or elected to an official position in the town of Yarmouth. Lucy Q. Cutter succeeded her in 1887, Melville C. Merrill in 1898, Frank Howard Drinkwater in 1911, Frank O. Wellcome in 1914 and Ernest C. Libby in 1936.

Cornelius Shaw's Cash Market (1899). The plural version, Shaws', appeared on the sign, indicating it was a family business.

At today's 91 Main Street is the former Captain Thomas Chase Store, built around 1819. Between 1895 and 1929 it was Leon Doughty's stove and hardware store, L.A. Doughty & Co. It is now Snip 'N Clip Hair Designs, still with the windows that were installed in 1932. Doughty moved across the street, into the building to be later occupied by L. R. Doherty's hardware store, Barbour's and Goffs, when his business expanded.

William H. Freeman's hairdressing salon (located above Doughty's before its move). Freeman lived on Lafayette Street. He had at least two children: William and Jennie.

Cyrus Curtis' Saturday Evening Post publishers.

The millinery shop of Susan Kinghorn (located at the eastern corner of Main and Portland Streets); between 1942 and 1953 [Harold B.] Allen's Variety Store, then Daken's, Romie's, Lindahl's, Donatelli's Pizza, Denucci's Pizza (briefly) and Connor's. Rosemont Market occupied the building for around twenty years, before moving across Portland Street in 2026.

Elder Rufus York's general store, located in the brick building now occupied by Rosemont Market at 108 Main Street, on the western corner of the Portland Street intersection. York ran the store with his wife, Zoa.

In 1874, the Lower Falls near the harbor was crowded with the homes of sea captains, merchants and shipbuilders.

An ornate, circular horse trough resembling a water fountain existed at the intersection of Main and Portland Streets in the early 1900s; it now stands behind the Merrill Memorial Library.

The parsonage for the Universalist church was the brick building at 89 Main Street, now occupied by Plumb-It, et al., to the east of Snip 'N Clip. It was built around 1845 by Bradbury True, whose sons owned the neighboring houses.

95 Main Street, a high-style Italianate, is now owned by the First Universalist Church.

On the other side of the church, at number 109, just to the east of where Old Sloop (later known as Union Hall) once stood, is an 1850-built Italianate house that was formerly the home of Edward J. Stubbs, one of Yarmouth's most prolific and successful shipbuilders.

Lyman Walker (1814–1906) and his son, Lyman Fessenden Walker, owned a general wood and coal business in the lower village.

124 Main Street, which faces the Bridge Street intersection, is the circa-1825 John Sargent House. Next door, at number 128, is a 1925-built house now used as the NYA admissions office.

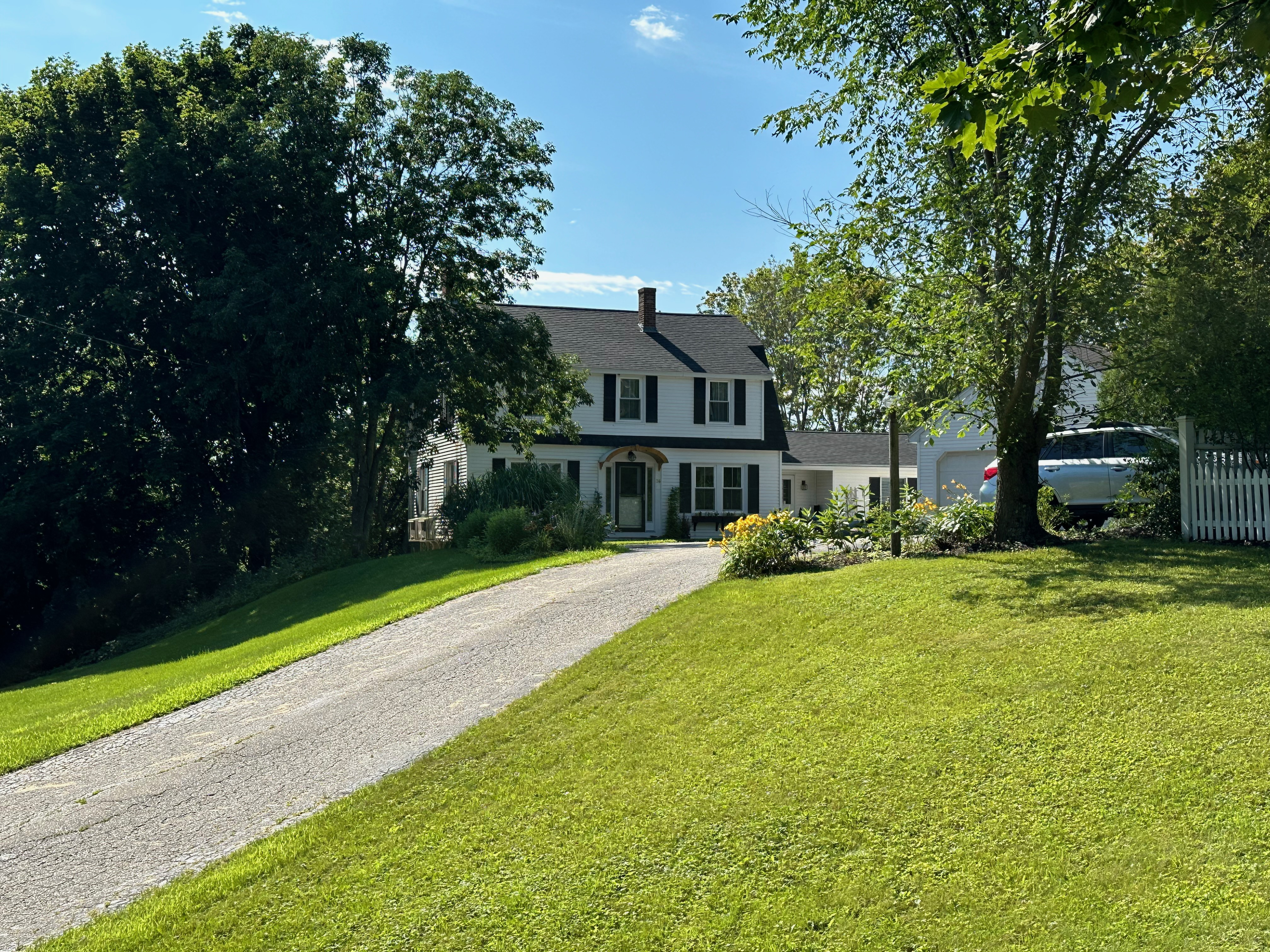
36 Main Street

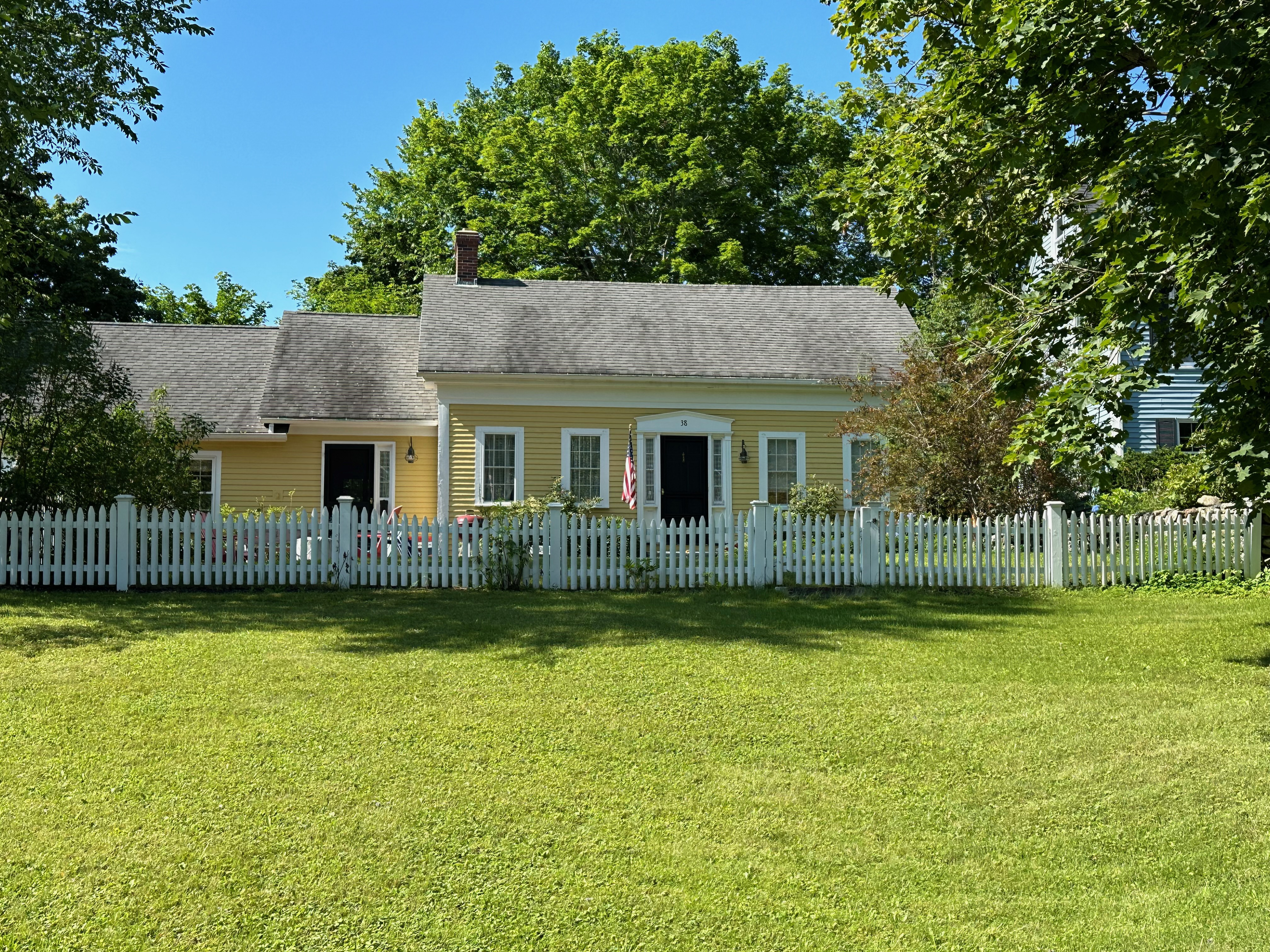
38 Main Street

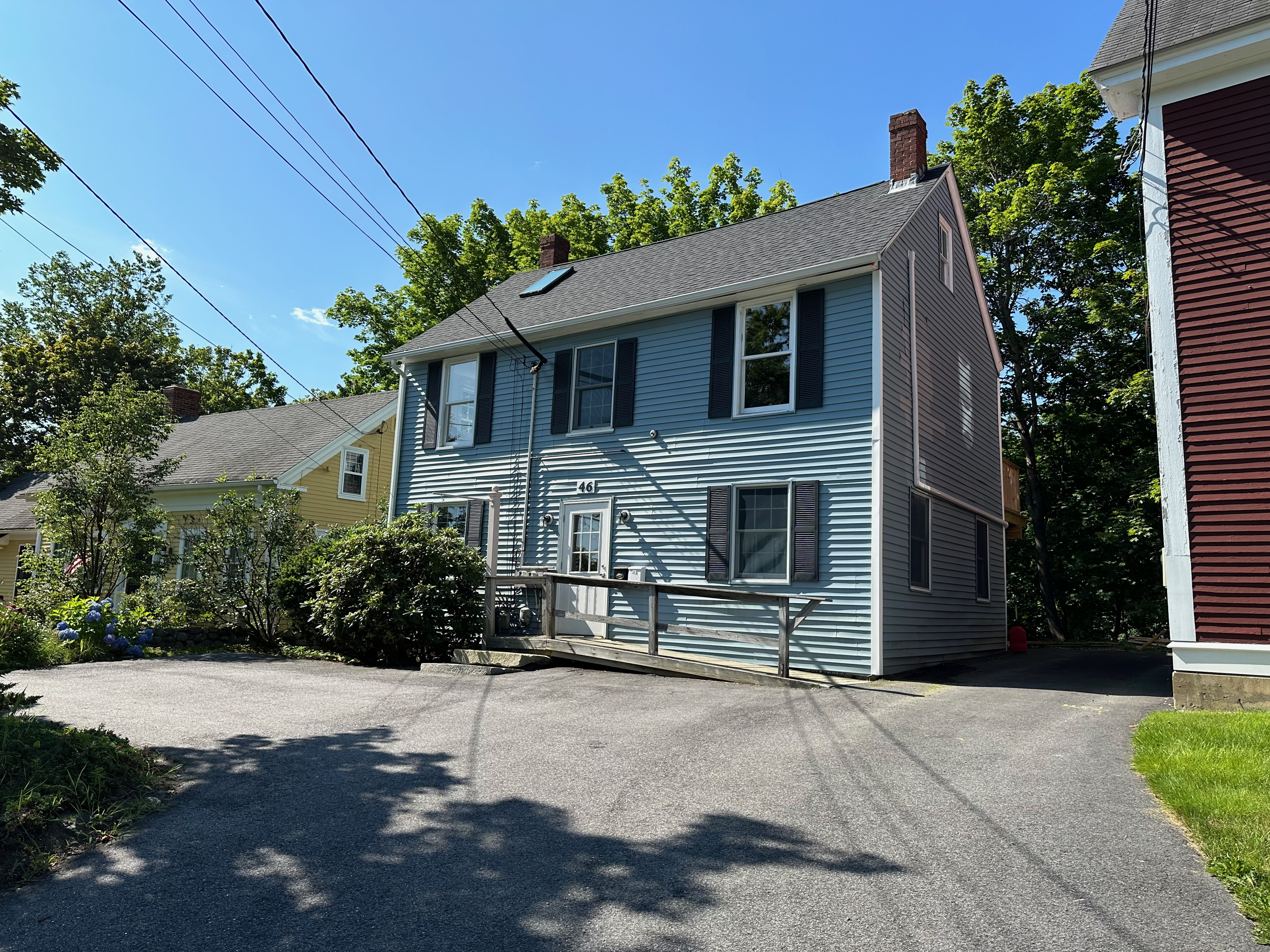
46 Main Street

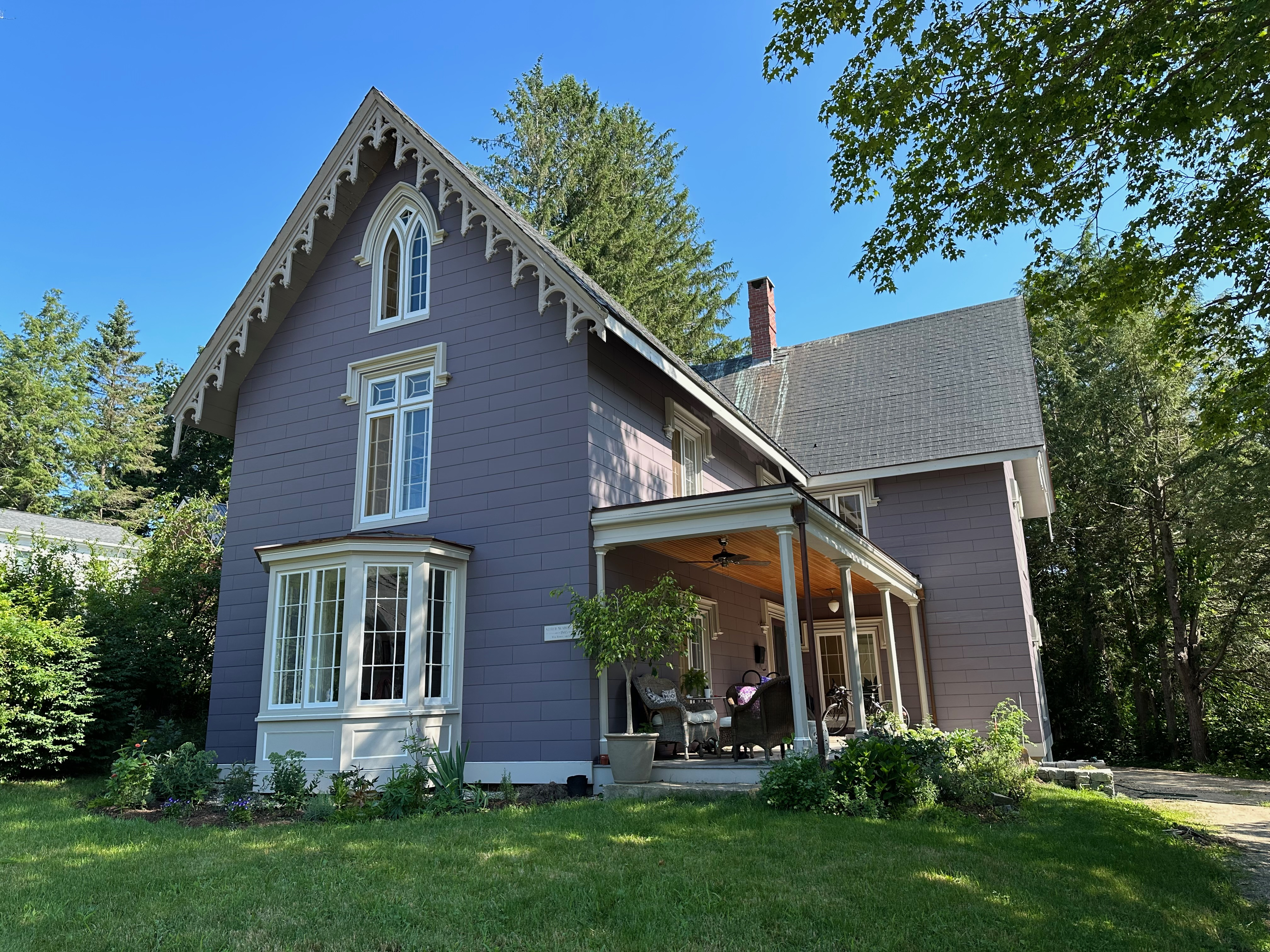
The Alfred Seabury House, at 49 Main Street, built in 1845

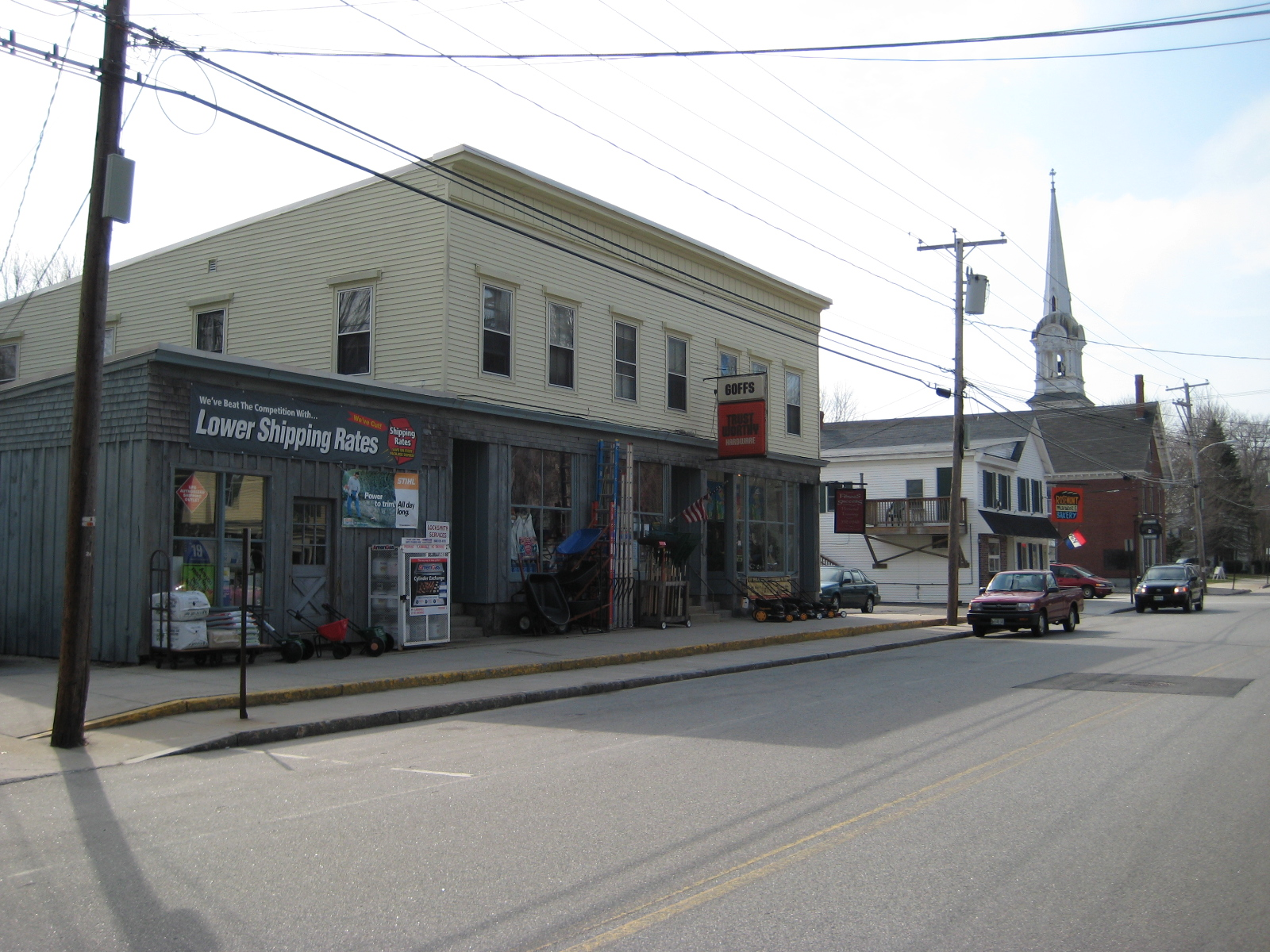
Goffs hardware store, at the eastern end of Main Street, closed in 2015 after 46 years in business

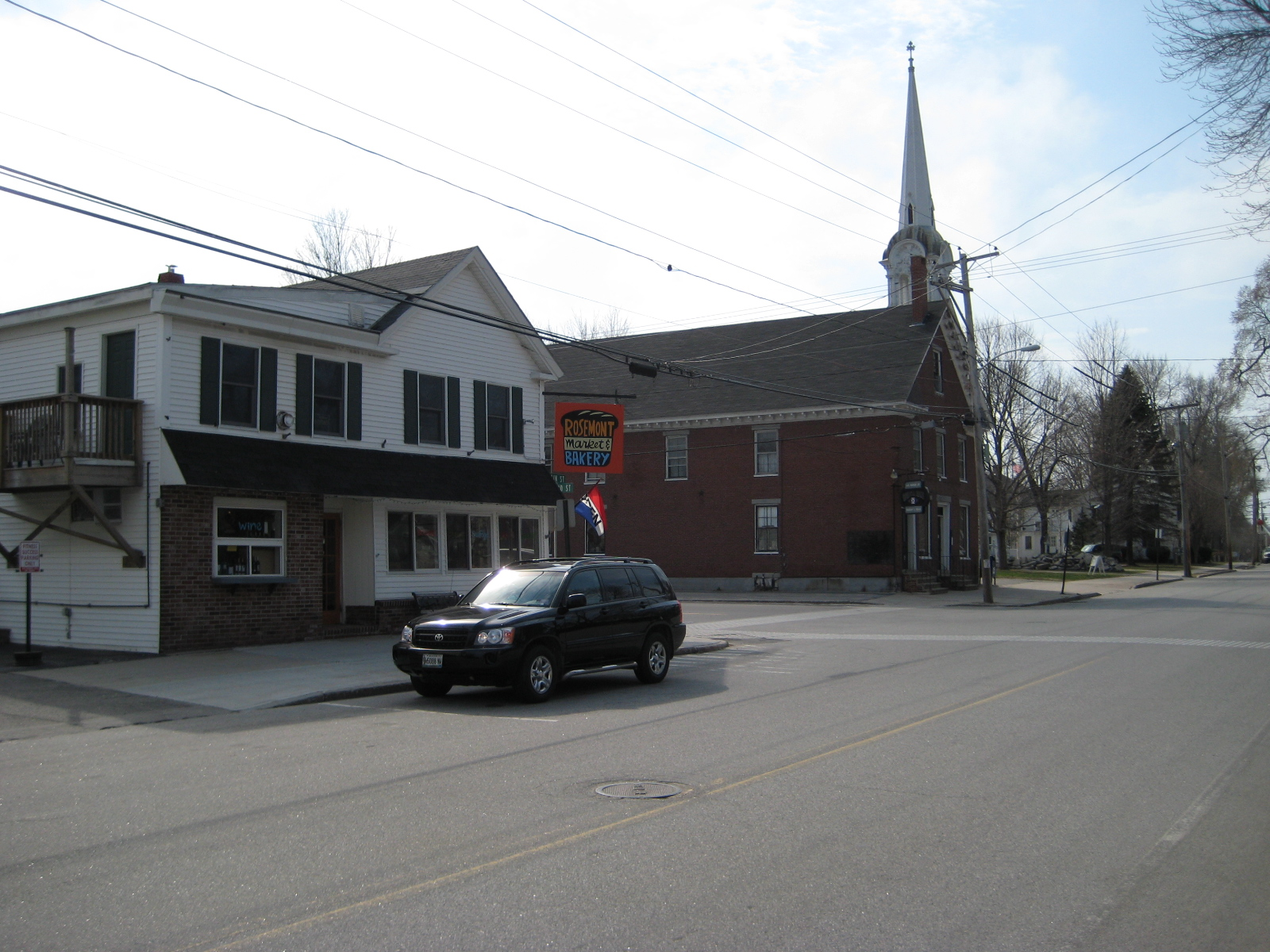
The intersection of Main and Portland Streets, looking west. The site of Susan Kinghorn's millinery is now a Rosemont Market & Bakery. The steeple belongs to the First Parish Congregational Church

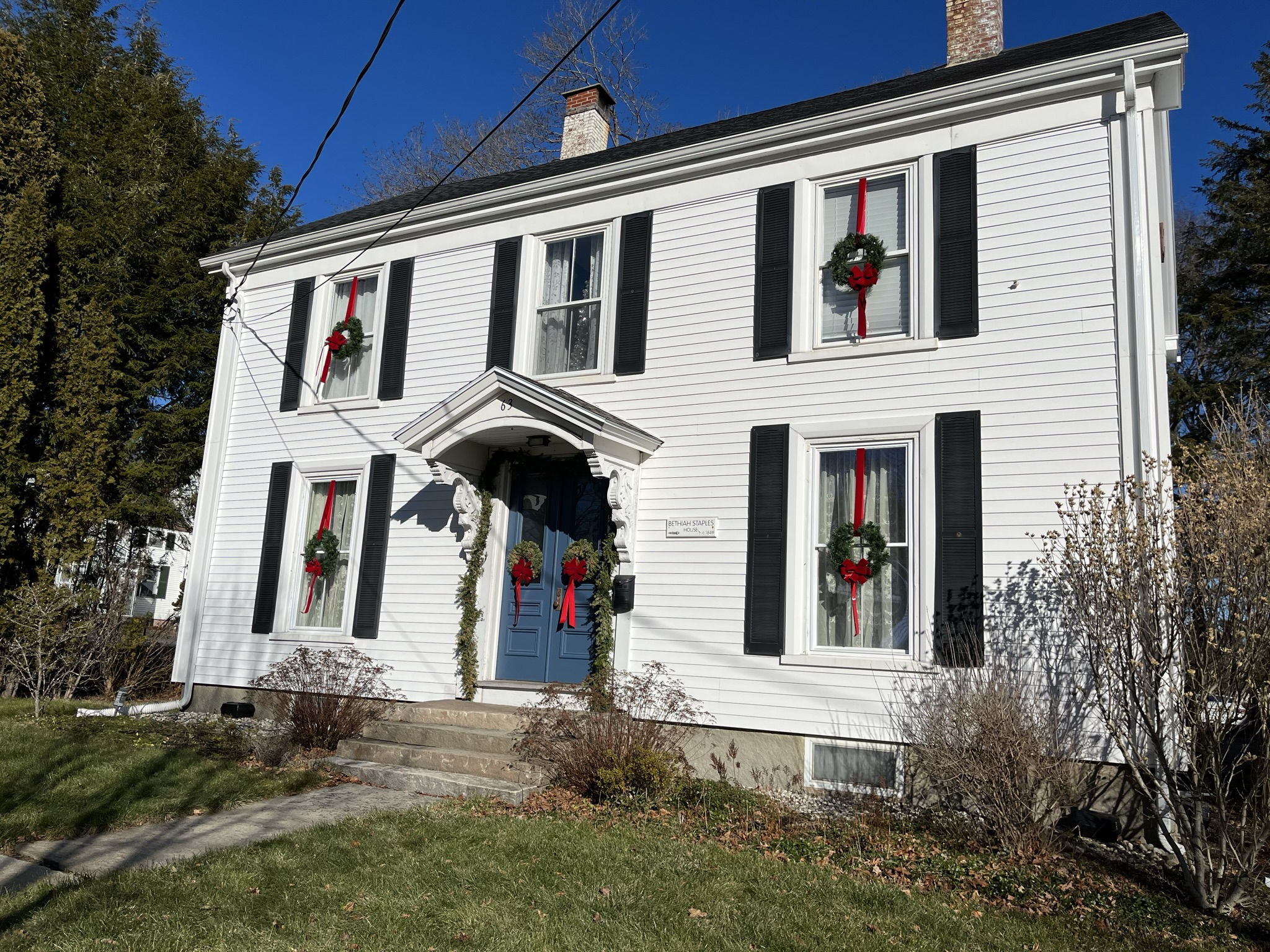
Bethiah Staples House, 63 Main Street

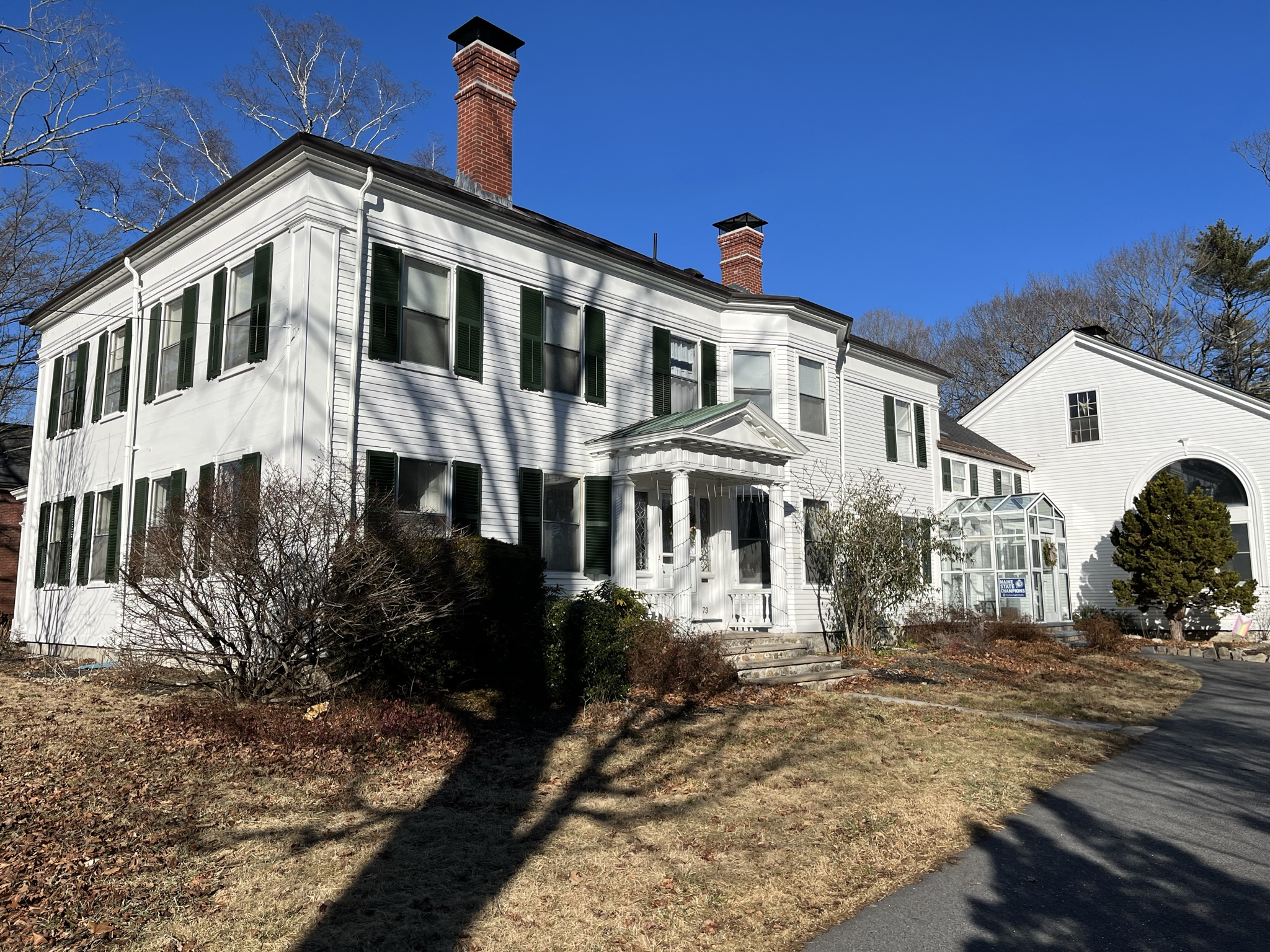
The former Jacob G. Loring home at 73 Main Street

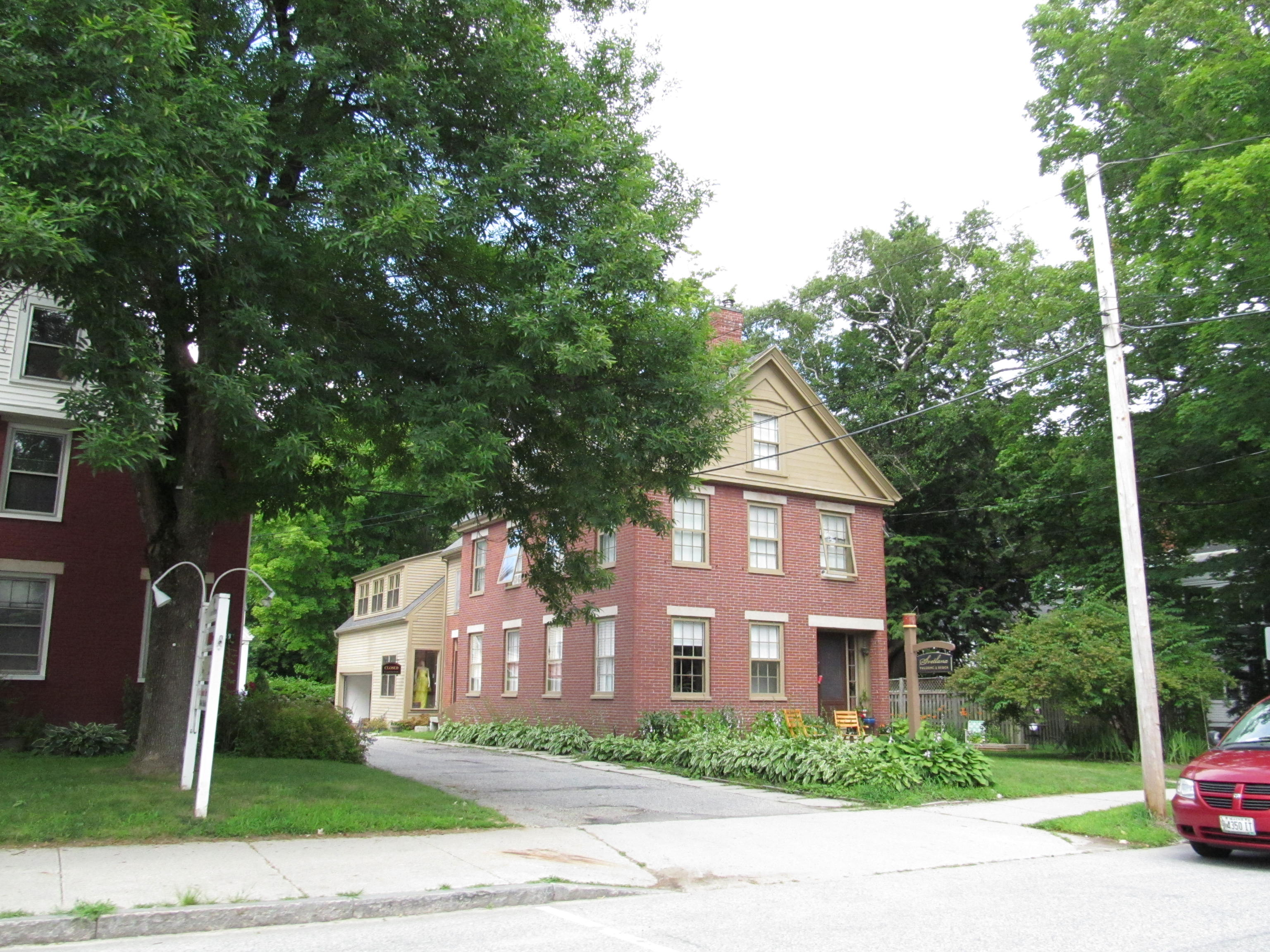
85 Main Street was built around 1848

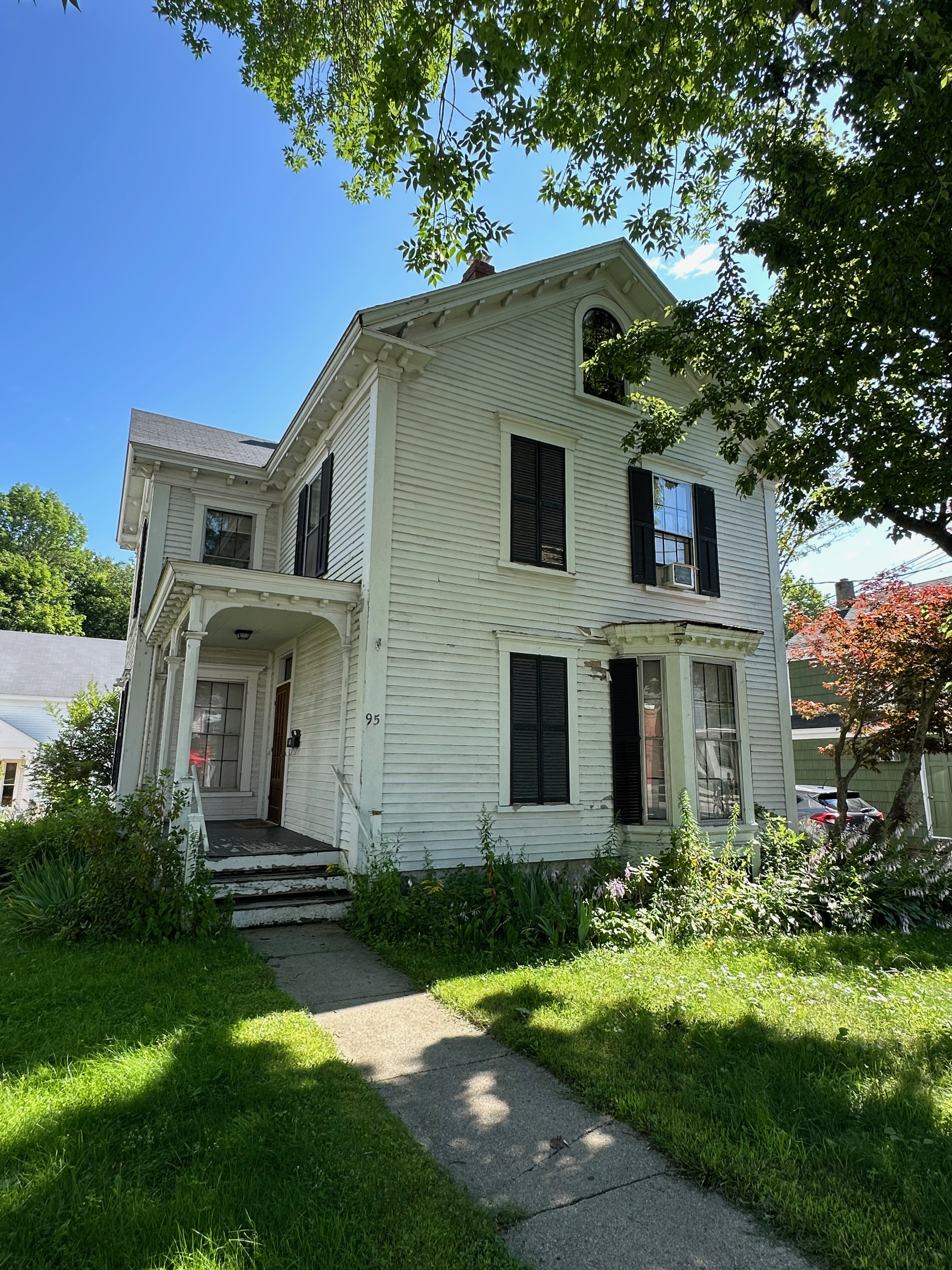
95 Main Street

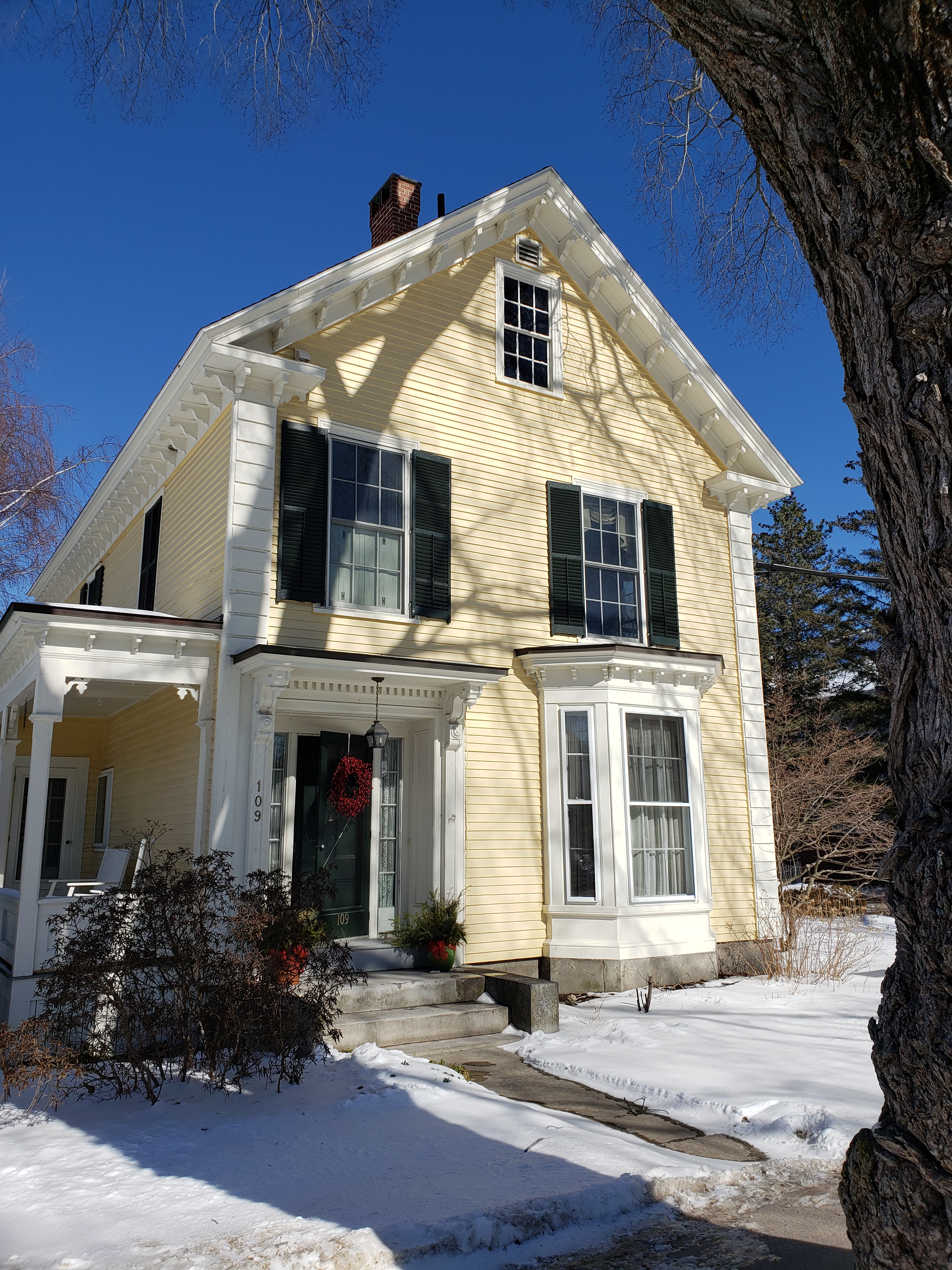
The Edward J. Stubbs House, 109 Main Street, built in 1850

== Marina Road ==
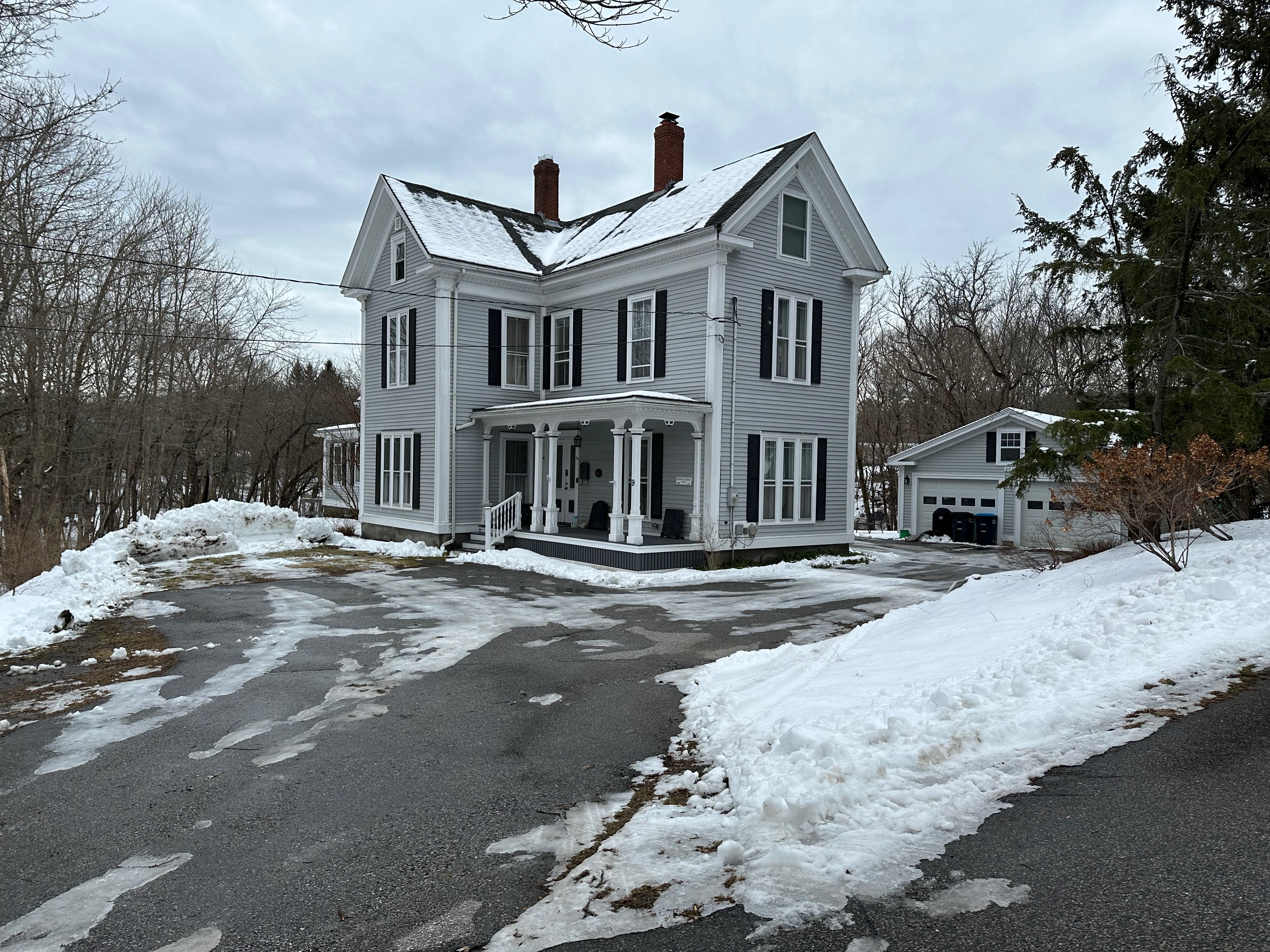
9 Marina Road (built in 1890)

Marina Road is the right-hand turn at the Staples Hill split with Main Street. It was one of the two access roads to the harbor from the village.

Original owner Peter Allen tore down the Hannah Russell House at 3 Marina Road and built the current structure in 1881. Until 2018 it was home to the business Women to Women.

Herman Seabury, a shipyard foreman, was the original owner of 9 Marina Road in 1890. It remained in his family for sixty years.

Number 22 is believed to date from around 1800. Number 36 was built around 1840.

The last building on Marina Road before the Lafayette Street intersection is number 59. Built in 1900 by Harry Dean as a tearoom, it later became a shoe-repair shop, an antique store and an office. It is, as of 2023, a nutritionist business.

== See also ==
- Historical buildings and structures of Yarmouth, Maine
