= 1 Main Street =

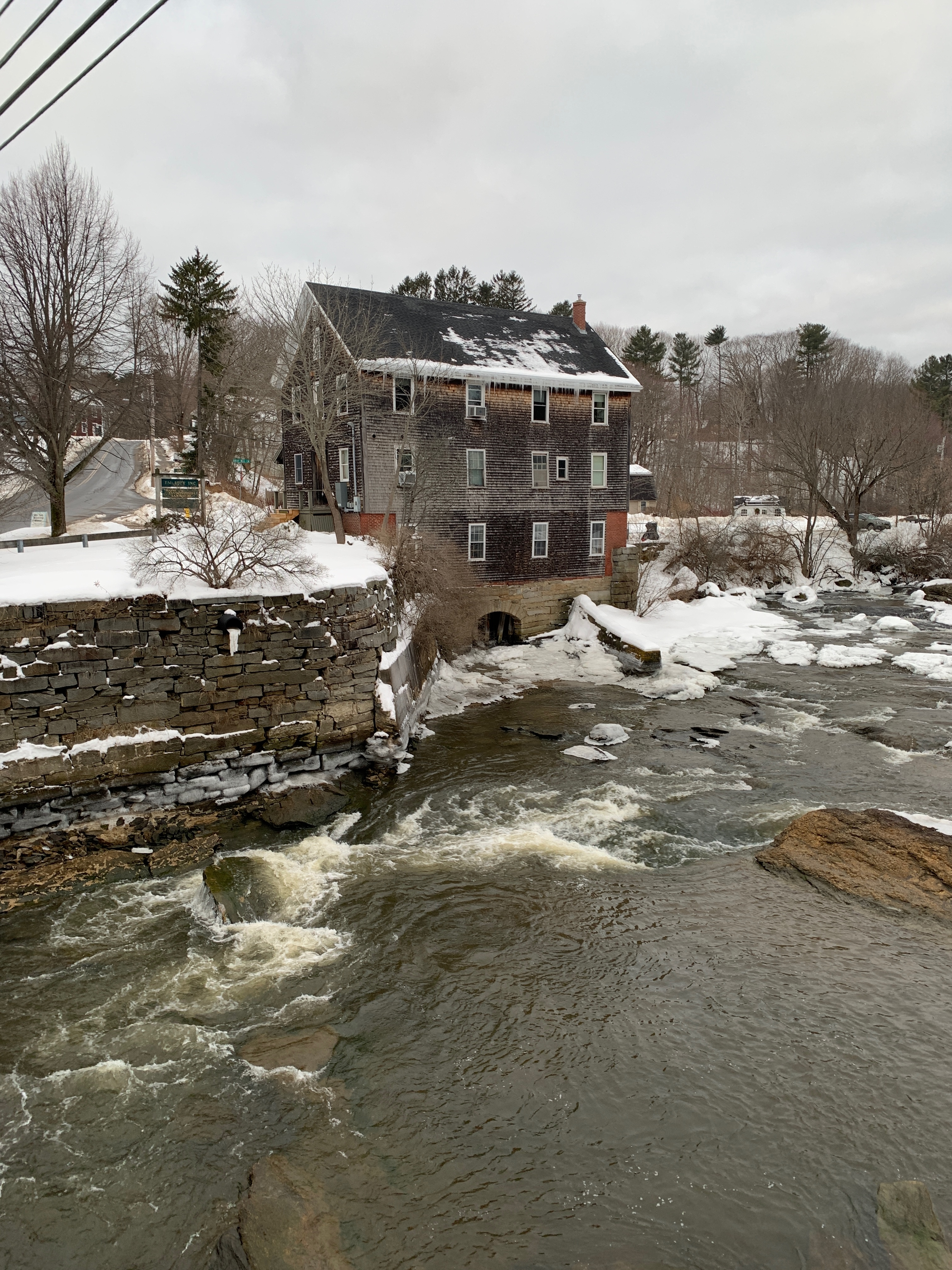
- The building in 2020, looking west from the East Main Street Bridge
- Interactive map of the 1 Main Street area

General information
- Location: Yarmouth, Maine, U.S., 1 Main Street
- Coordinates: 43°47′55″N 70°10′43″W

Technical details
- Floor count: 3

1 Main Street is a historic building in Yarmouth, Maine. It is located in the town's Lower Falls neighborhood, beside the First Falls and near Main Street's intersection with East Main Street. It stands across the Royal River from Grist Mill Park, which was the site of several mills in the 17th century, having been relocated from nearby Pleasant Street.

In the 18th century, this was the site of James Craig's sawmill. In 1911, Yarmouth Manufacturing Company's electric power plant was built at the location. Later businesses on this side included a fishing, hunting and camping equipment store and Industrial Wood Products. In the present-day building are F. M. Beck, C. A. White & Associates and Maine Environmental Laboratory.

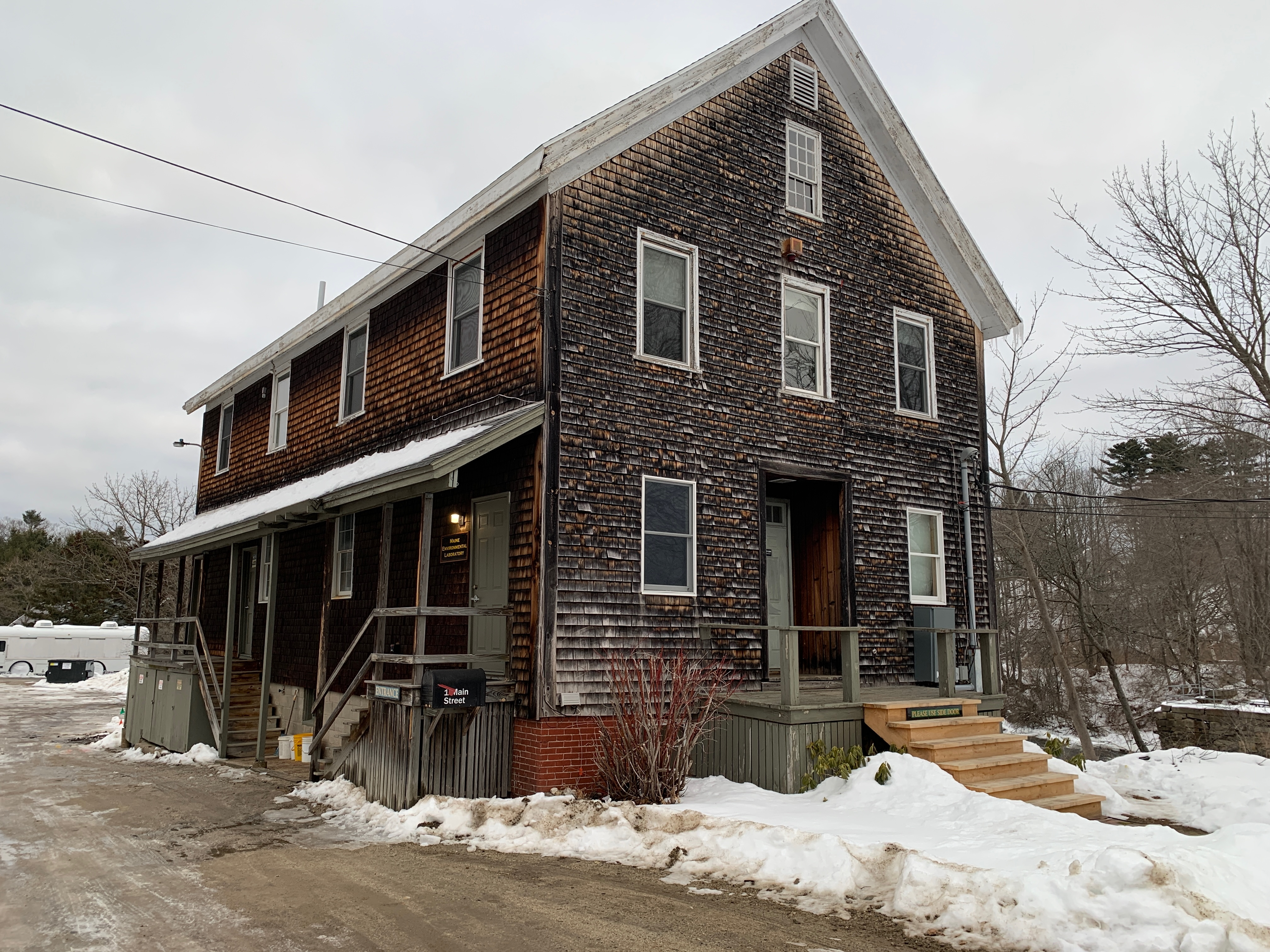
The main entrance to the building, on Main Street

== See also ==
- Historical buildings and structures of Yarmouth, Maine
