= Grist Mill Park =

Public park in Yarmouth, Maine, U.S.

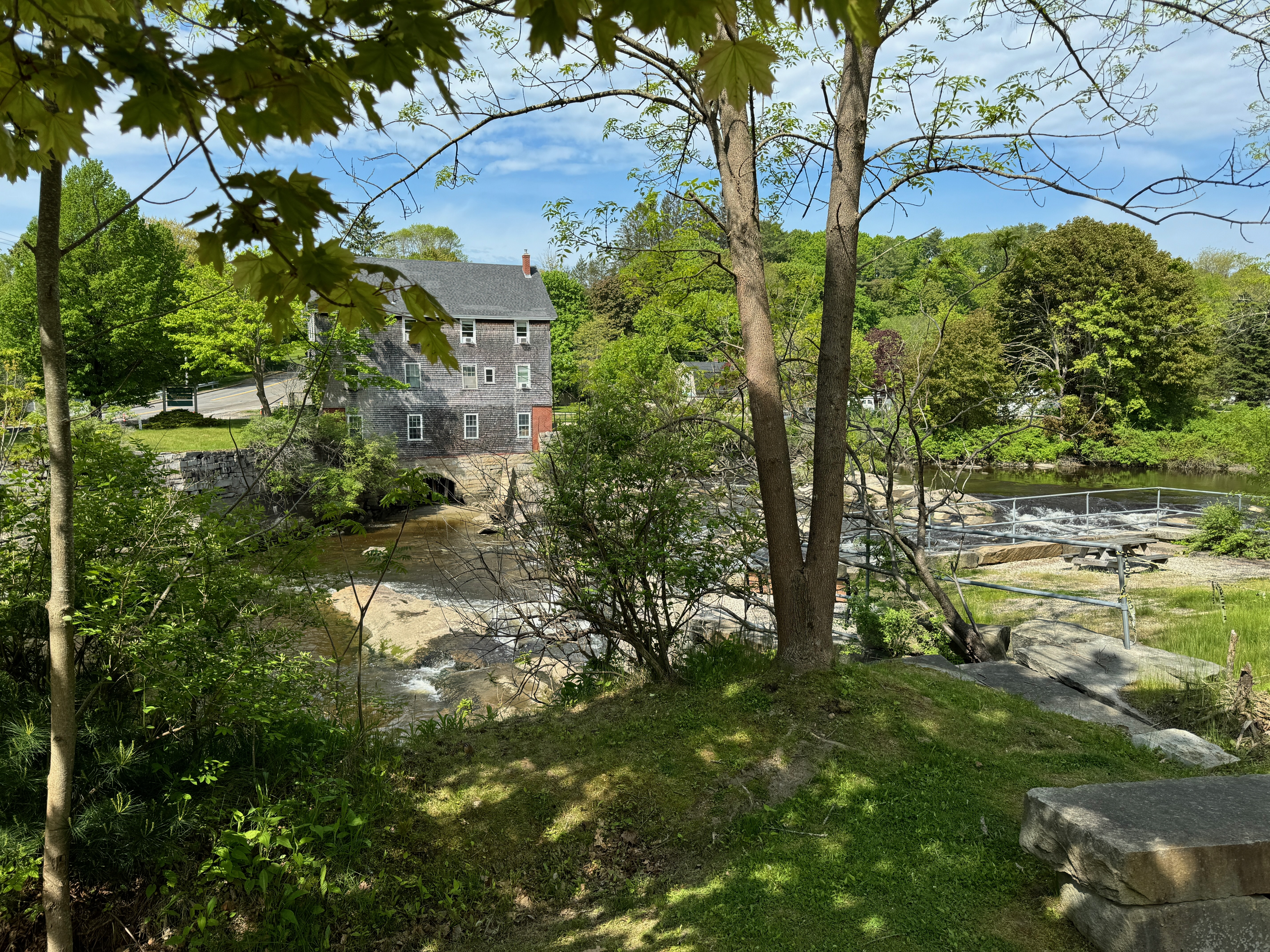
- Looking west from the park across Royal River's First Falls to 1 Main Street
- Interactive map of Grist Mill Park
- Type: Urban park
- Location: Yarmouth, Maine, U.S.
- Coordinates: 43.79885°N 70.17792°W
- Area: 0.5 acres (0.0020 km^{2}; 0.00078 mi^{2})
- Created: 1980s
- Owner: Town of Yarmouth
- Open: Dawn to dusk daily

Grist Mill Park is an urban park in Yarmouth, Maine, United States. Located on East Main Street, in the town's Lower Falls area, and overlooking the Royal River's First Falls from the east, the park partly occupies the former site of a 17th-century sawmill. That mill was built in October 1674 by Englishman Henry Sayward and Colonel Bartholomew Gedney. The foundations of a later mill, Lower Grist Mills, constitutes today's overlook of the river. Lower Grist Mills was built in 1813 and was in business for 36 years, grinding wheat and corn into flour using power generated by the water turbines set in the fast-flowing river below. Between 1870 and 1885, it was the site of Ansel Loring's second mill, named Yarmouth Flour Mill.

The park is around 0.5 acres (0.20 ha).

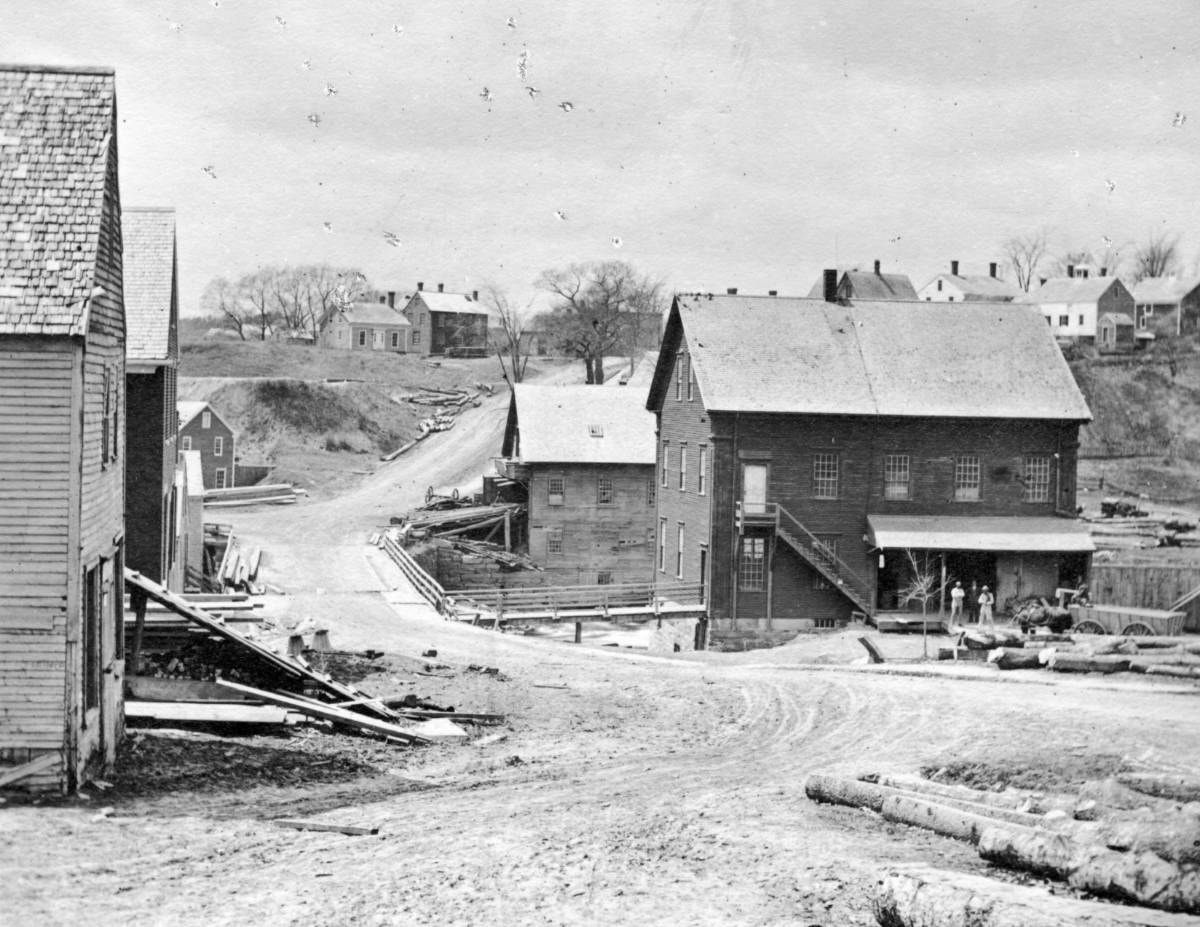
A 19th-century westerly view of one of the former grist mills (right) on the site of today's park

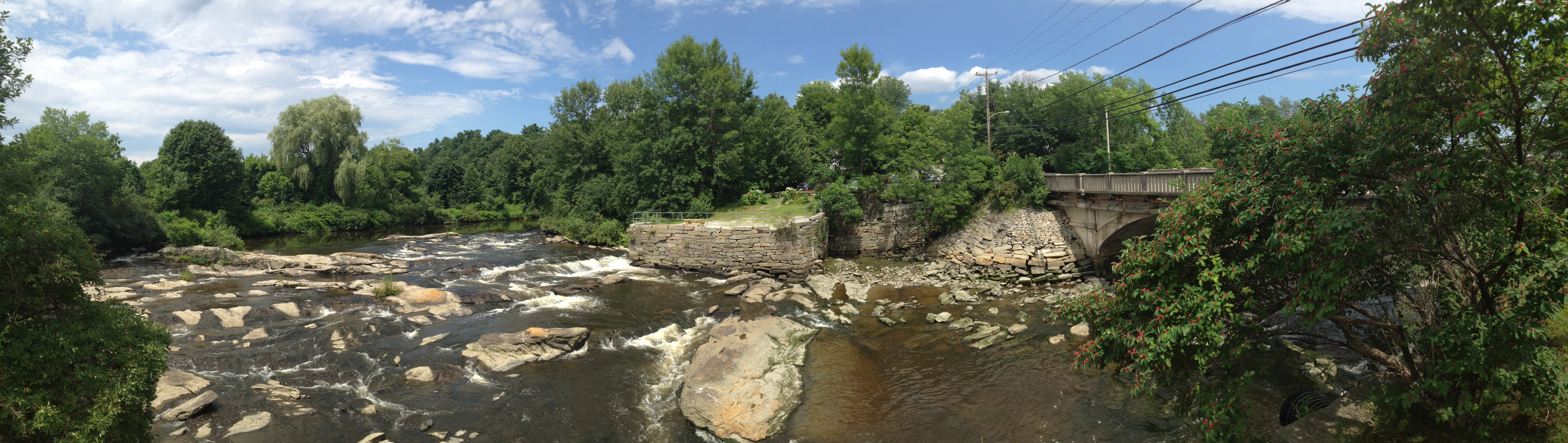
A panorama of the park from the western side of the river
