= 68 East Main Street (Yarmouth, Maine) =

Historic house in Maine, United States

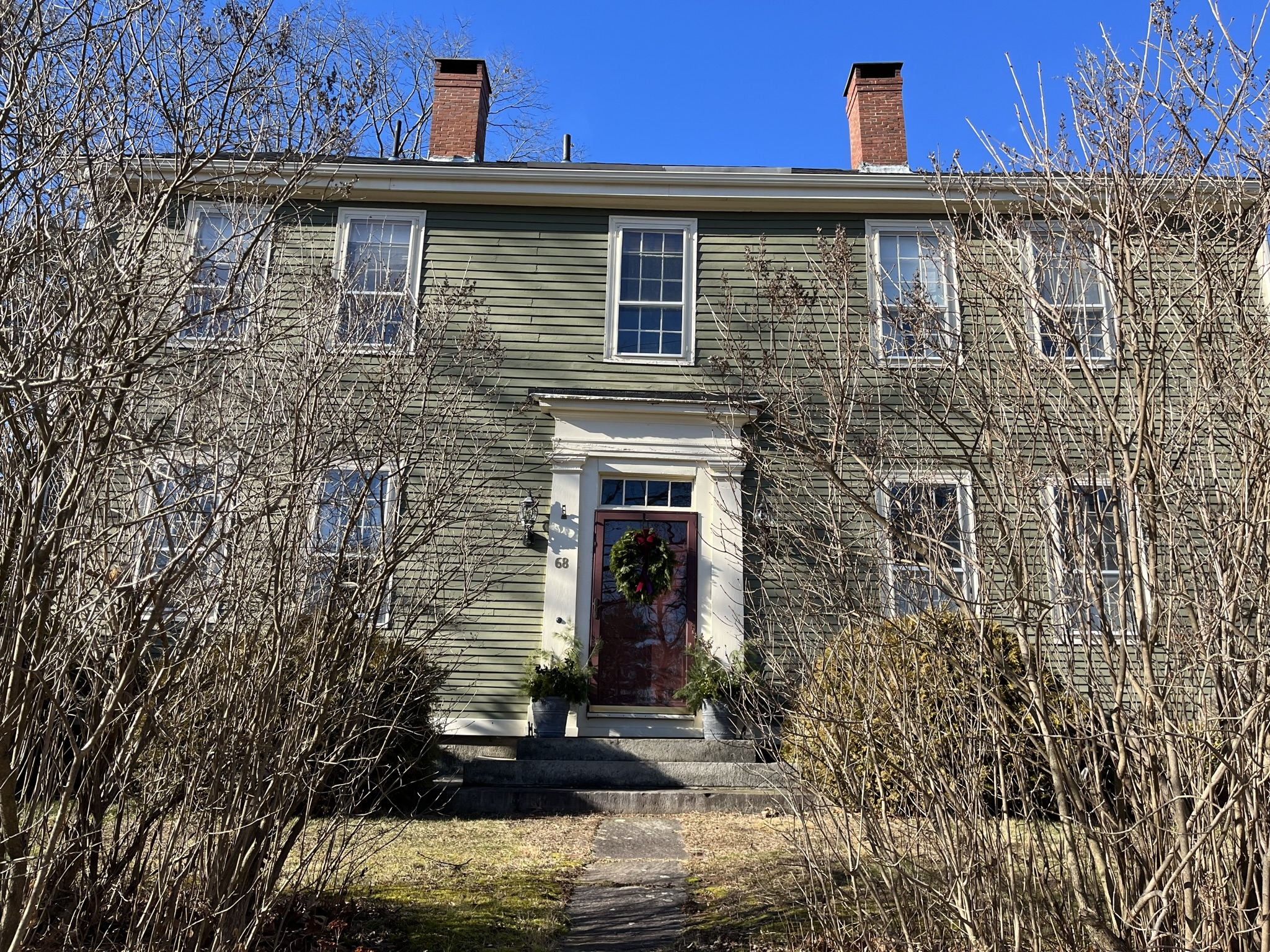
- 2023 view
- Alternative names: Stockbridge Hall

General information
- Location: Yarmouth, Maine, U.S., 68 East Main Street
- Coordinates: 43.800354079°N 70.17648280°W
- Completed: 1785 (241 years ago)

Technical details
- Floor count: 2.5

68 East Main Street is a historic home in Yarmouth, Maine, United States. It was built in 1785, when the town was part of North Yarmouth (then a part of the Province of Massachusetts Bay), around seventy years after the third and earliest permanent settlement of the town.

Standing on East Main Street, at the corner of Yankee Drive, the property became the home of Deacon Calvin Stockbridge, brother of merchant William Stockbridge, who lived across East Main Street. Grist mill and saw mill owner Peter Weare also lived here. The building had doubled in size by 1790.

It has also served as a tavern, a general store and, between 1900 and 1907, a college preparatory and home school for girls, known as Stockbridge Hall, run by Alice and Minerva Dufour.

The home stood across Yankee Drive from "Herbie," which was planted in 1793, eight years after the home was completed, and felled 217 years later in 2010. Between 1997 and 2010, it was the oldest and largest American elm in New England.

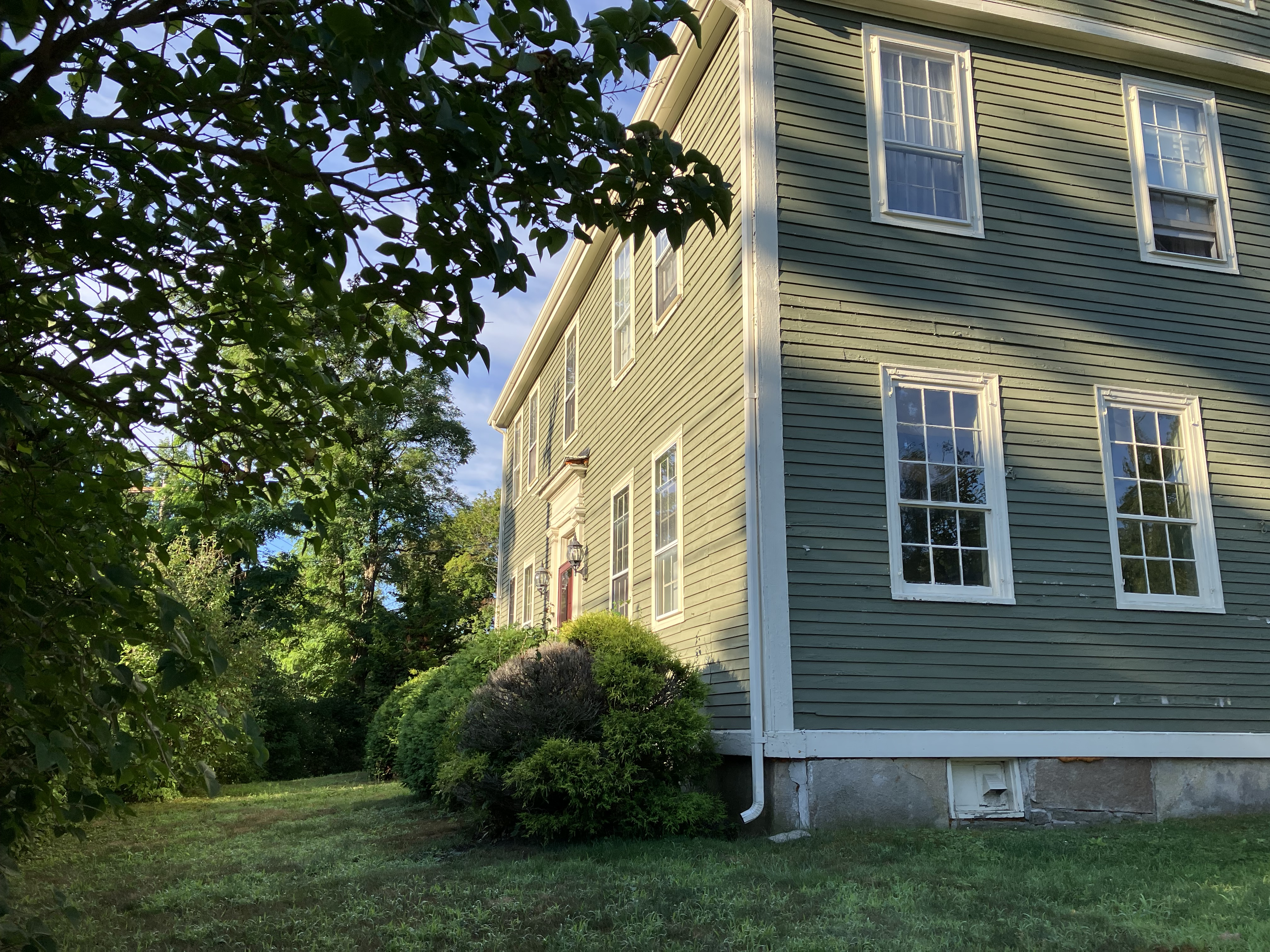
Northeastern corner

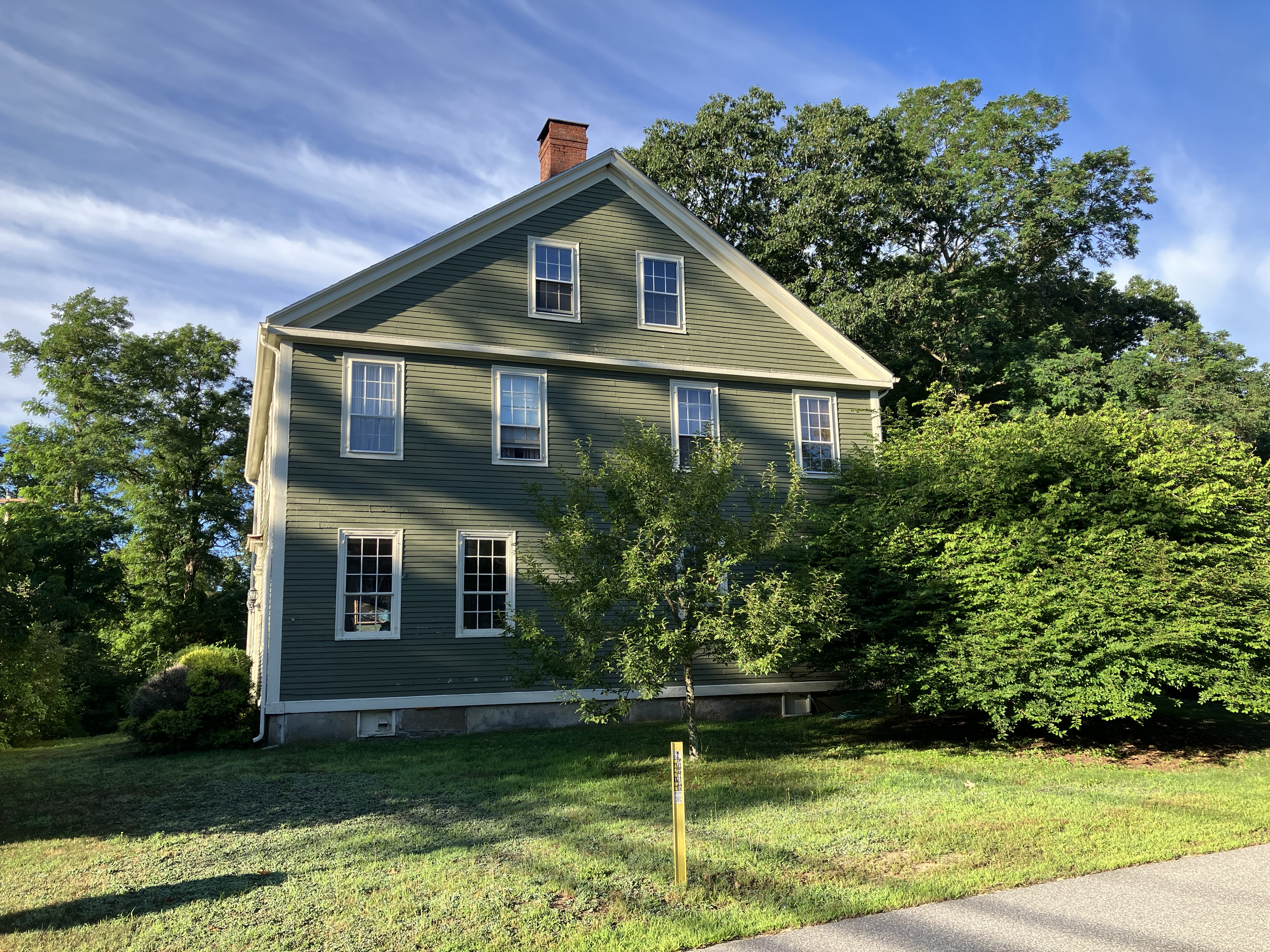
The northern elevation

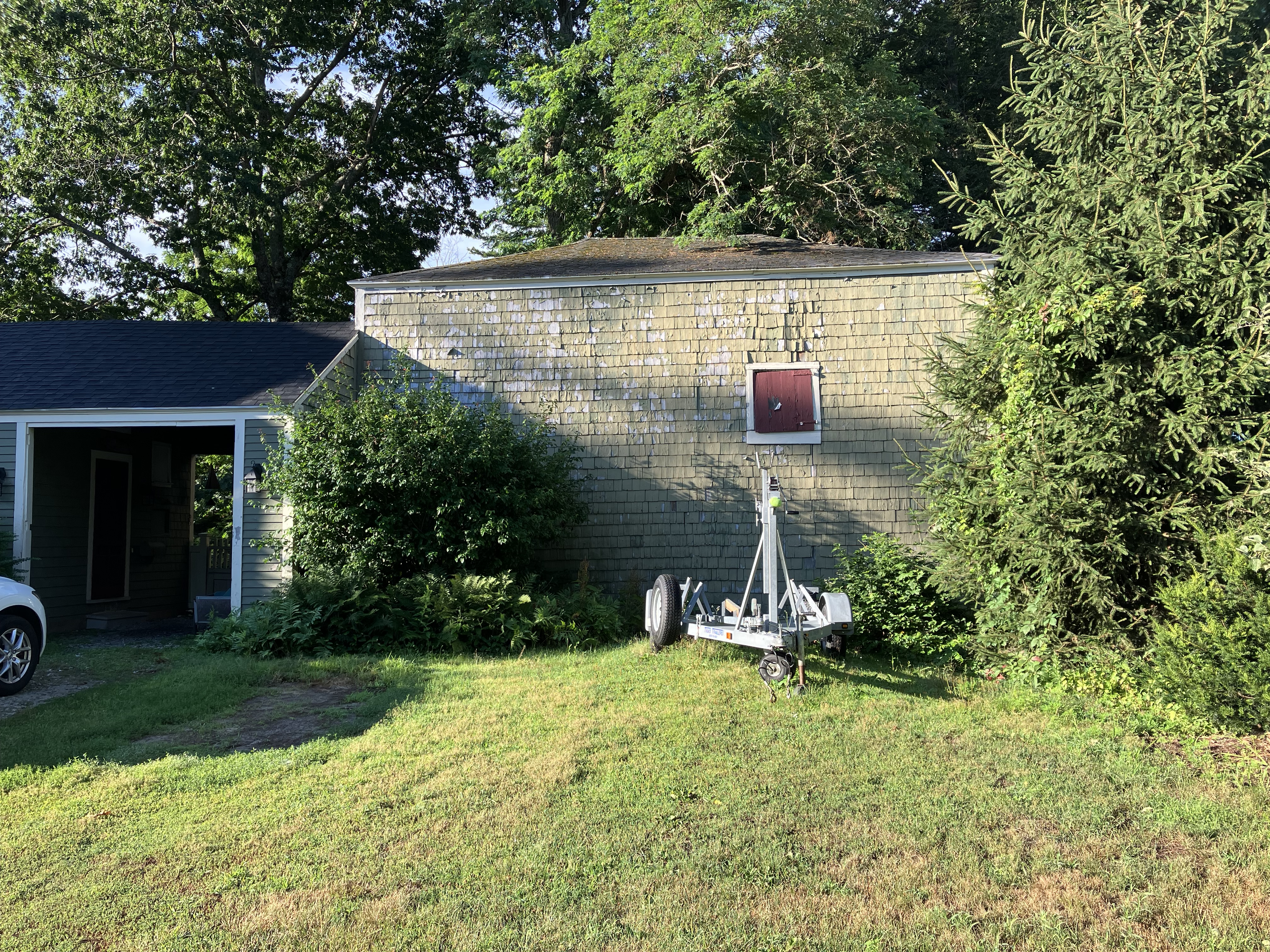
The home's breezeway and barn

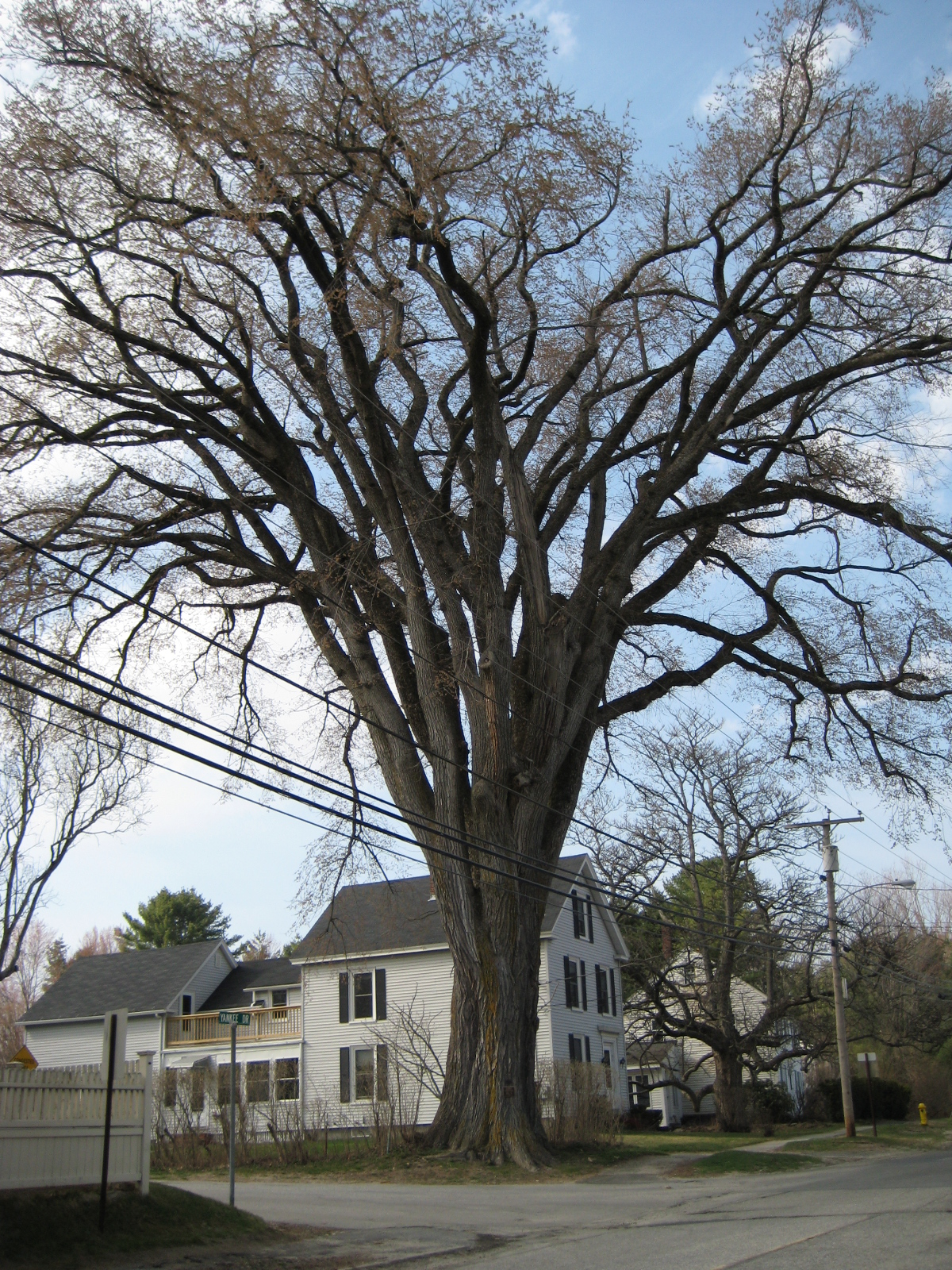
"Herbie", in a photograph taken in front of 68 East Main Street in 2008

== See also ==
- Historical buildings and structures of Yarmouth, Maine
