= William Stockbridge =

American businessman

- Born: William Reed Stockbridge; June 29, 1782; Hanover, Massachusetts, U.S.
- Died: January 3, 1850 (aged 67); Yarmouth, Maine, U.S.
- Resting place: Old Baptist Cemetery, Yarmouth, Maine
- Occupation: Businessman

William Reed Stockbridge (June 29, 1782 – January 3, 1850) was an American merchant, ship owner and town treasurer who was active in coastal North Yarmouth, Massachusetts (now in Maine), in the 19th century.

== Life and career ==
Stockbridge was born on June 29, 1782, in Hanover, Massachusetts, to William Stockbridge (1752–1841) and Ruth Bailey (1754–1839). His brother, Calvin, became a guardian of a young John Brown Russwurm.

William married Olive True, daughter of Nathaniel, in 1805. In 1810, he became the first owner of 51 East Main Street, in the Lower Falls area of North Yarmouth, then in Massachusetts but now in Maine. Stockbridge's maternal uncle Lebbeus Bailey had been clockmaker in North Yarmouth up until his death in 1827.

Three years later, they had a son, William Jr., who became a physician. Other children included Maria, Marcia and Joseph.

In 1821, he purchased, with his brother, a mill at the Royal River's Second Falls. They ran it successfully for twenty years as W. R. & C. Stockbridge, a paper company. In 1836, it was incorporated as Yarmouth Paper Manufacturing Company, but when advancements in machinery and processes arrived, competition became too difficult, and the mill closed.

In 1824, he received a vote to become a congressman for the State of Maine in the House of Representatives.

He was listed, in 1833, as being a member of the Maine Temperance Society, along with a Joseph Stockbridge, and was a stockholder in the Bank of Portland in 1840.

Stockbridge was one of the owners of the schooner Cairo, which was built at Yarmouth's harbor in 1872. Its co-owners included William and Samuel Bucknam, David True and James Mann.

== Death ==
Stockbridge died on January 3, 1850, aged 67. He is buried in Yarmouth's Old Baptist Cemetery. His wife died the following year, aged 63, and is interred beside him.

There is a Stockbridge Drive in Yarmouth, off Melissa Drive, but it is not known whether he is its namesake.
