= 108 Main Street (Yarmouth, Maine) =

Historic house in Maine, United States

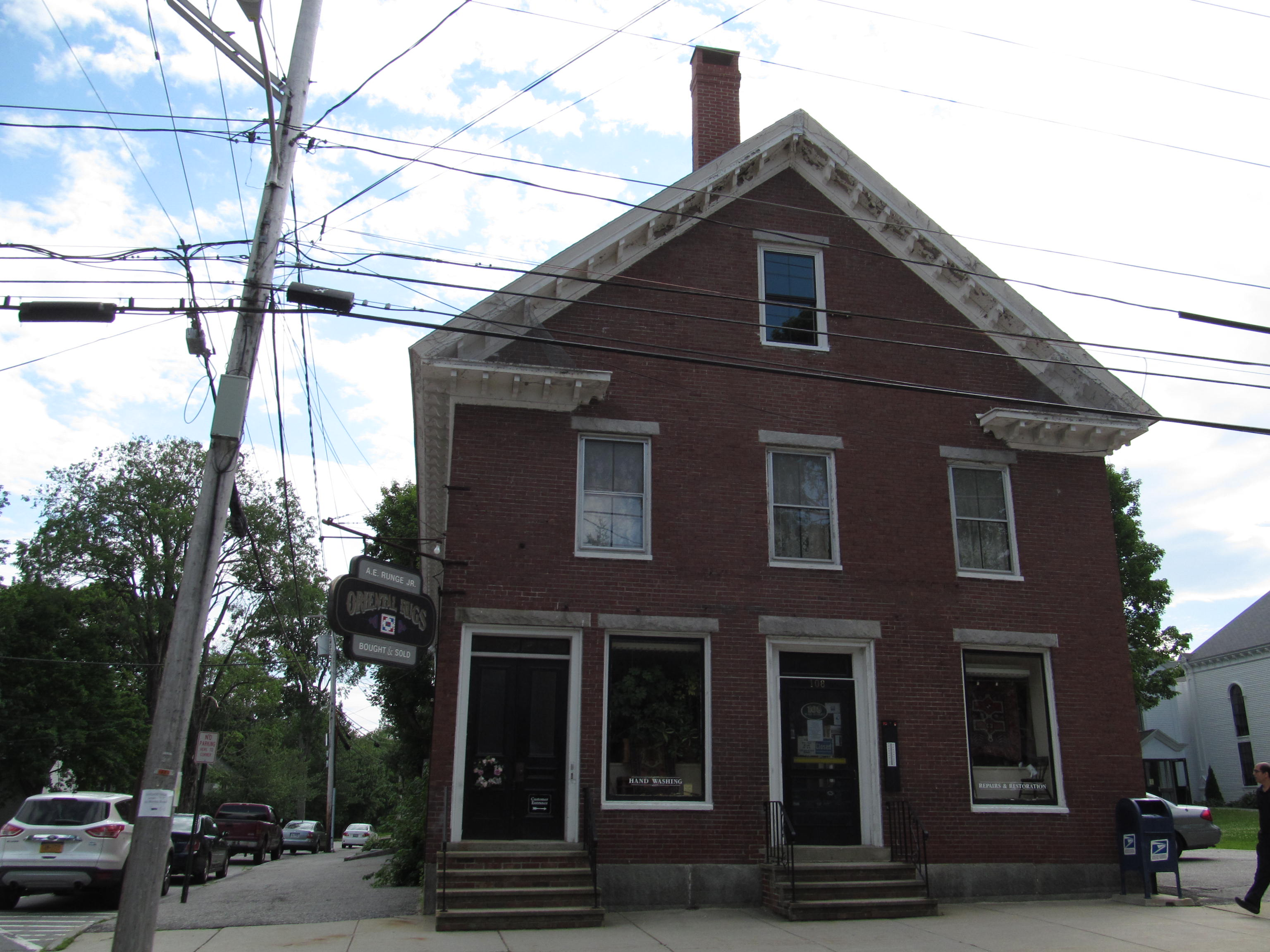
- The building in 2012, viewed from Main Street and looking south down Portland Street
- Interactive map of the 108 Main Street area

General information
- Location: Yarmouth, Maine, U.S., 108 Main Street
- Coordinates: 43.79892121°N 70.18293702°W
- Completed: c. 1860 (166 years ago)

Technical details
- Floor count: 3

108 Main Street is a historic three-storey building in the Lower Falls area of Yarmouth, Maine.

Standing at the western corner of Main Street and Portland Street, the property was built in the 1860s for Rufus York, who ran a general store out of it with his wife, Zoa. It later became the drug stores of B. L. Alden, then Melville C. Merrill, then Frank W. Bucknam (1894–1900) on the first floor and William B. Kenniston on the second floor, then (from January 1904) William Hutchinson Rowe. The building was Roger Vaughan's Rexall Pharmacy between 1945 and 1963. (Vaughan's original sign was restored to the Portland Street corner of the building in 2014 but was taken down the following year.)

The building was the home of Runge's Oriental Rugs between 1990 and 2022, although the business was established in 1880. It is now occupied by Rosemont Market.

== See also ==
- Historical buildings and structures of Yarmouth, Maine
