= 51 East Main Street (Yarmouth, Maine) =

Historic house in Maine, United States

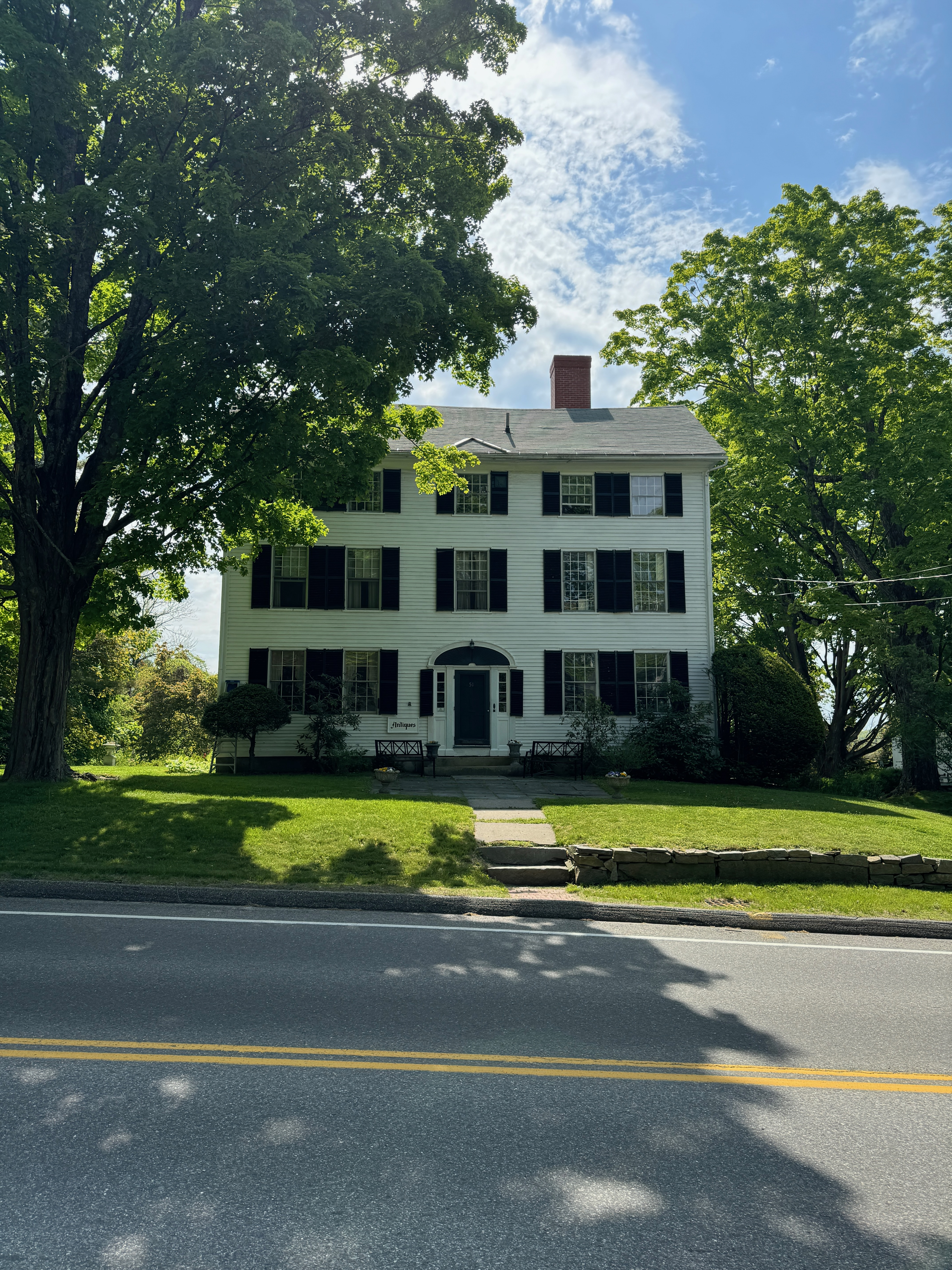
- The building in 2024
- Interactive map of the 51 East Main Street area
- Alternative names: William R. Stockbridge House

General information
- Location: Yarmouth, Maine, U.S., 51 East Main Street
- Coordinates: 43.799623925°N 70.1762309°W
- Completed: 1810 (216 years ago)
- Owner: W. M. Schwind Antiques

Technical details
- Floor count: 3.5

51 East Main Street, also known as the William R. Stockbridge House, is a historic home in Yarmouth, Maine. It was built in 1810, on today's State Route 88, before Yarmouth's secession from North Yarmouth. Its original owner was merchant William Stockbridge.

Gilbert du Motier, Marquis de Lafayette, stayed in the building prior to his death in 1834. The nearby section of Route 88 is named Lafayette Street in his honor.

Stockbridge is believed to be the original 1848 owner of 35 East Main Street, just a few yards down the hill.

After Stockbridge's death in 1850, the home changed hands several times. In the 1920s, Adaline Crockett converted it into the Royal River Inn. Crockett's Royal River Cabins were in operation between 1934 and 1950 on the ocean side of nearby Spring Street, at its split with East Main Street. The enterprise began as an inn in the property, and continued as its office until the 1940s. In 1946, First Lady Eleanor Roosevelt and her entourage stayed in one of the cabins because the Eastland Park Hotel in Portland would not permit her dog, Fala, to stay in the hotel.

The building retains its original Federal-style door surround, fanlight, windows, trim and siding.

The rear of the property now overlooks Interstate 295, after it was built above Yarmouth's harbor in 1961.

In front of the property there stood a milestone providing the distance to Boston. The preceding one, on Pleasant Street, gives a distance of 138 miles (222 km). The milestones are part of the Boston-to-Machias extension of the Charleston-to-Boston "King's Highway".

== See also ==
- Historical buildings and structures of Yarmouth, Maine
