= 35 East Main Street (Yarmouth, Maine) =

Historic house in Maine, United States

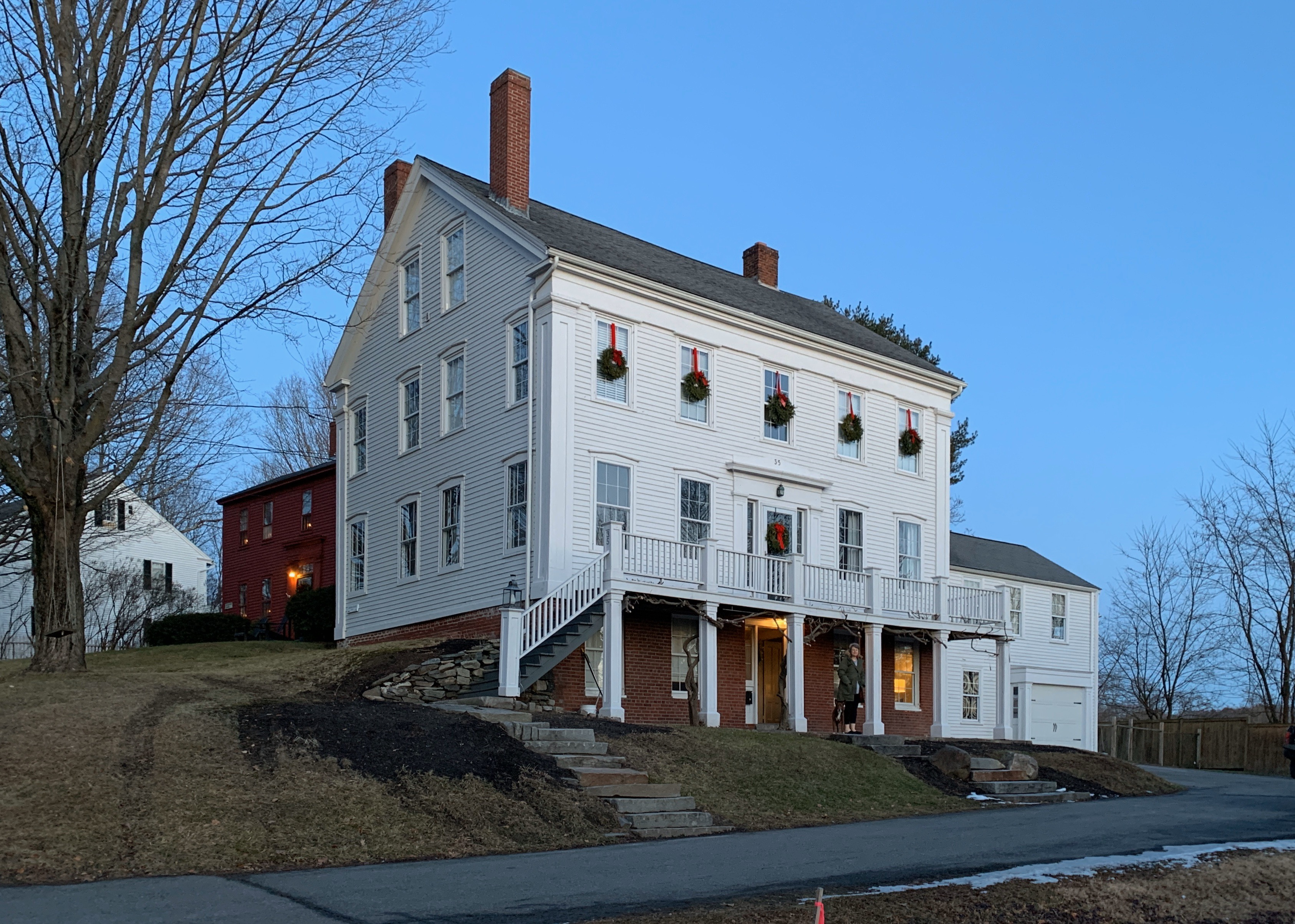
- The building in 2019. Behind it stands the Johnathan True House, which dates to 1780
- Alternative names: Jeremiah Baker House

General information
- Location: Yarmouth, Maine, U.S., 35 East Main Street
- Coordinates: 43.7987104704°N 70.177430950°W
- Completed: 1848 (178 years ago)

Technical details
- Floor count: 4

35 East Main Street, also known as the Jeremiah Baker House, is a historic four-storey home at 35 East Main Street in the Lower Falls area of Yarmouth, Maine. Between 1780 and the turn of the 19th century, Lower Falls saw an increase in its population after early settlers gradually moved inland from the area around the Meetinghouse under the Ledge on Gilman Road. Built in 1848, possibly for William Stockbridge, before Yarmouth's secession from North Yarmouth, the home overlooks Yarmouth Marina, which was a bustling working harbor from the early to late 19th century, and the area of the harbor historically known as Grantville. It stands adjacent to the Johnathan True House.

One of its early owners was Jeremiah Baker, a shipbuilder, who lived here between 1857 and around 1871.

The building's above-ground brick basement was once used a store, named Oakes & Mitchell and run by Nathan Oakes and Daniel Mitchell.

== See also ==
- Historical buildings and structures of Yarmouth, Maine
