= Johnathan True House =

Historic house in Maine, United States

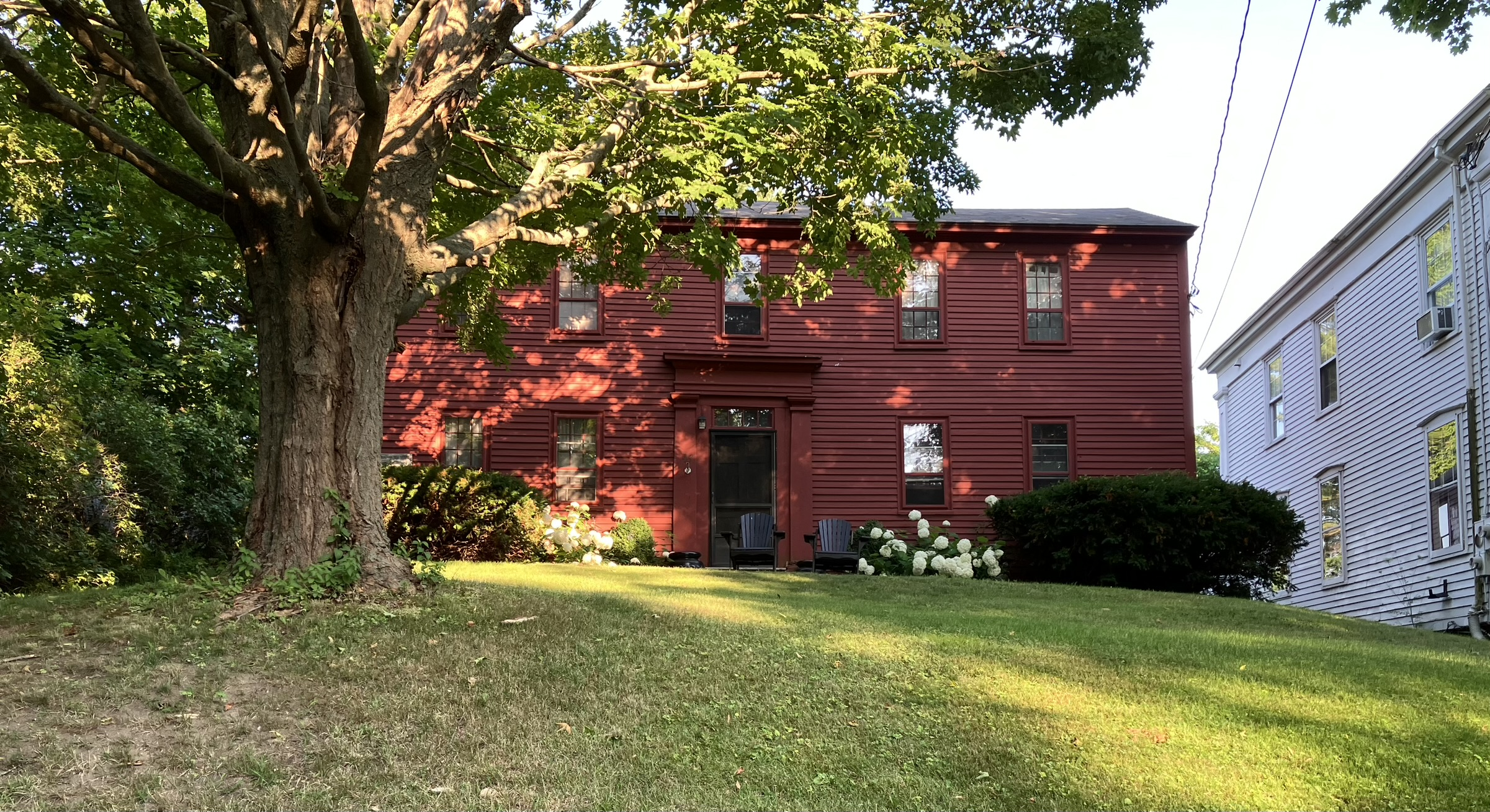
- The building in 2022. 35 East Main Street is at right
- Interactive map of the Johnathan True House area

General information
- Architectural style: Colonial
- Location: Yarmouth, Maine, U.S., 43 East Main Street
- Coordinates: 43.7992246954°N 70.1765893°W
- Completed: 1780 (246 years ago)

Technical details
- Floor count: 2

The Johnathan True House is a historic home at 43 East Main Street in the Lower Falls area of Yarmouth, Maine. Built in 1780, before Yarmouth's secession from North Yarmouth, it is one of the oldest surviving buildings in the town. Between 1780 and the turn of the 19th century, Lower Falls saw an increase in its population after early settlers gradually moved inland from the area around the Meetinghouse under the Ledge on Gilman Road.

The home was originally built for Johnathan True, a clothier who owned a store at Lower Falls. It was later associated with Dr. David Jones and David Pratt, one of the town's earliest shipbuilders.

The rear of the property now overlooks Interstate 295 after it was built above Yarmouth's harbor in 1961.

== See also ==
- Historical buildings and structures of Yarmouth, Maine
