= Eleanor Houston Smith =

Eleanor Houston Smith (née Houston; 1910 – August 29, 1987) was an American conservationist and philanthropist. Her organic beef farm served as an early example of how modern, sustainable agricultural practices could prevent harm to Maine's coast and wildlife, and her donations along Maine's coastline created nature preserves and recreational areas that are still in use today. Her donation of hundreds of geography resources to the University of Southern Maine's Osher Map Library is also a notable contribution to public education about the natural world.

== Personal life ==
Houston was born in Philadelphia in 1910 to Charlotte Harding Shepherd Brown and Samuel Frederic Houston. She was her parents' only child together, but she had one step-brother and two step-sisters from her father's previous marriage to Edith Atlee. She grew up with her parents and siblings in Druim Moir, her paternal grandparents' estate in Philadelphia's Chestnut Hill neighborhood. Houston's paternal grandfather, Henry Houston, was a wealthy real estate developer and railroad executive in Philadelphia who contributed to the development of Chestnut Hill.

Houston married Lawrence M. C. Smith on February 23, 1933, in the neighborhood she grew up in at the Church of St. Martin-in-the-Fields. They remained in Philadelphia, but spent their summers at their second house in Freeport, Maine. Smith and her husband had six children: Sarah (Sallie), Eleanor, Sam, Meredith, Minie, and Lewis. At the time of her death, Smith had 15 grandchildren.

== Conservation ==
In 1947, the Smiths purchased Wolfe's Neck Farm in Freeport, Maine. They began an organic beef farm in the 1950s on the property, leading the implementation of modern organic farming practices. The couple avoided chemical pesticides and prioritized working with Maine's ecosystem rather than against it.

During this time period, Maine's land and water were damaged by water pollution and deforestation, environmental problems that made it difficult for Maine's residents to enjoy the outdoors and threatened the future of the landscape.

The Smiths cared about public access to land and preserving Maine's meadows and shores just as much as they cared about Maine's agricultural future, so they created their farm to demonstrate how less invasive farming practices could preserve the landscape and its beauty.

In addition to pioneering sustainable agriculture practices, Smith demonstrated her passion for the environment through grassroots advocacy. She was part of community efforts to found the American Farmland Trust and The Nature Conservancy's Maine chapter.

== Philanthropy ==
As she grew older, Smith donated the several pieces of land that she and her husband owned to organizations committed to cultivating outdoor spaces for wildlife conservation, public education and recreation.

In Philadelphia, Smith and her cousin, Margaret Houston Meigs, founded the Schuylkill Valley Nature Center with their collective donation of 365 acres of woodlands and fields. Since opening in 1965, the property now known as the Schuylkill Center for Environmental Education has become a natural sanctuary in an otherwise urban landscape. The center promotes environmental education and stewardship through its nature programs for schoolchildren, environmental art showcases and a clinic that cares for injured wildlife, providing a place for city residents to connect with nature.

Back in Freeport, Maine, Smith and her husband donated 145 acres of woods to the Maine Audubon Society. The Maine Audubon Society opened the Mast Landing Audubon Sanctuary on the donated land in 1967. Today, the sanctuary on the Harraseeket River estuary remains a place where the general public can view local wildlife, visit historical sites and explore trails.

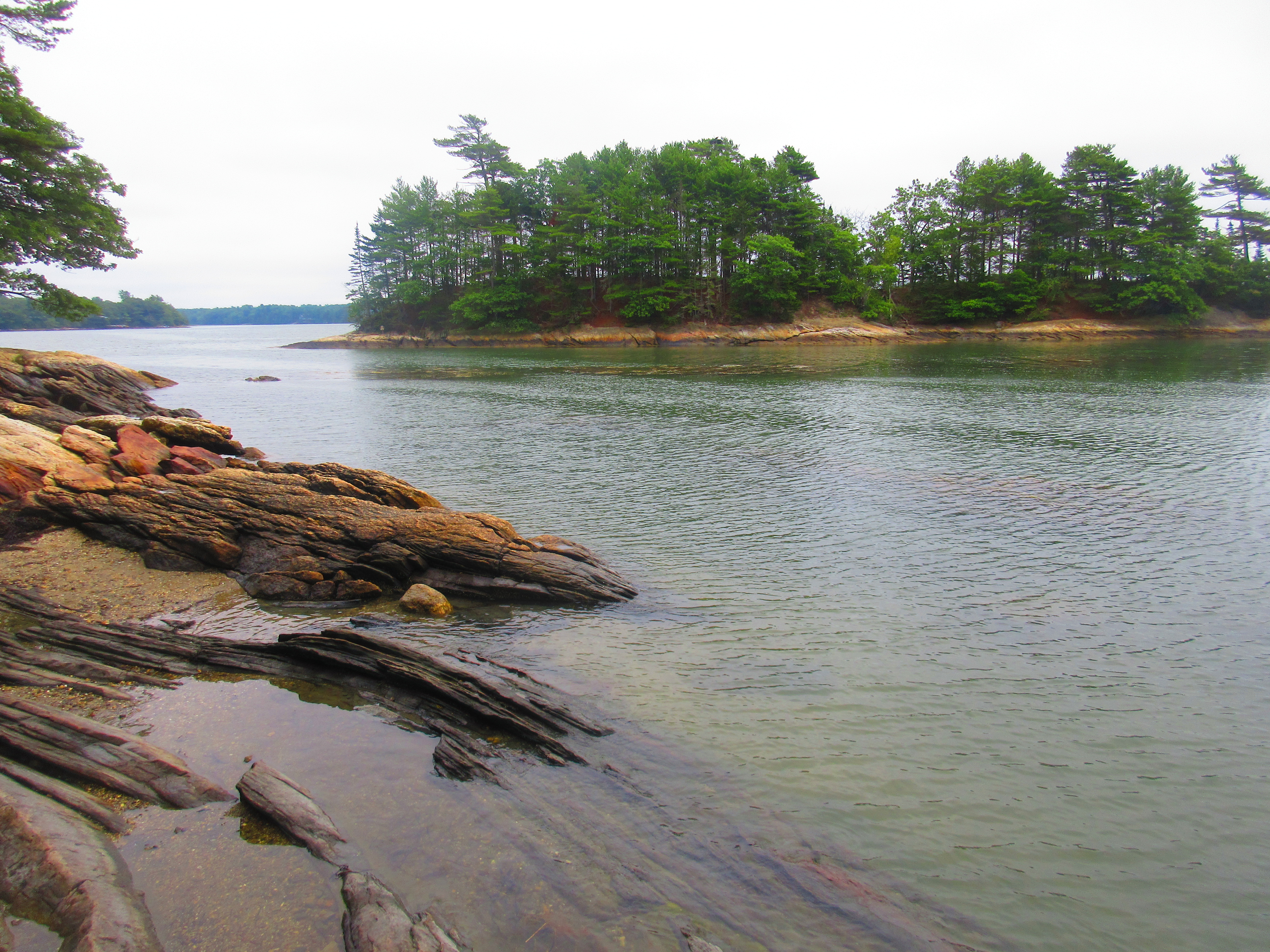
Wolfe's Neck Woods State Park

Two years later, Smith and her husband donated more than 200 acres of marshes, fields and woodlands to the state of Maine that would become Wolfe's Neck Woods State Park.

After her husband's death in 1975, Smith continued to run Wolfe's Neck Farm until 1985, when she donated the farm to the University of Southern Maine. Under the university's ownership, the 626-acre property is now part of the Wolfe's Neck Center of Agriculture and the Environment, where the public can learn about regenerative agriculture and appreciate Maine's natural landscape by exploring the center's demonstration farm, historic buildings and trails.

Smith also donated her vast geography resource collection to the University of Southern Maine. She and her husband enjoyed learning about history and geography, particularly related to Maine's coastline, and that interest led to an accumulation of geography tools. In 1986, she donated their collection of 458 sheet maps, 685 atlases and books and 62 globes to the university. These works are held in the Osher Map Library, where they can be used as educational resources for students.

== Death and legacy ==
Smith died on August 29, 1987, in Portland, Maine, at 77 years old. In 1992, her five living children donated the Smith-Houston-Ogden-Morris Papers to the American Philosophical Society, a collection of documents related to the Smith family and the families associated with them amounting to nearly 350 linear feet. The documents include wills, marriage certificates, genealogies, photographs, financial accounts, letters, illustrations and photographs from the 1650s to the 1980s.
