= Little River (Casco Bay) =

Coordinates: 43.82814°N 70.07672°W

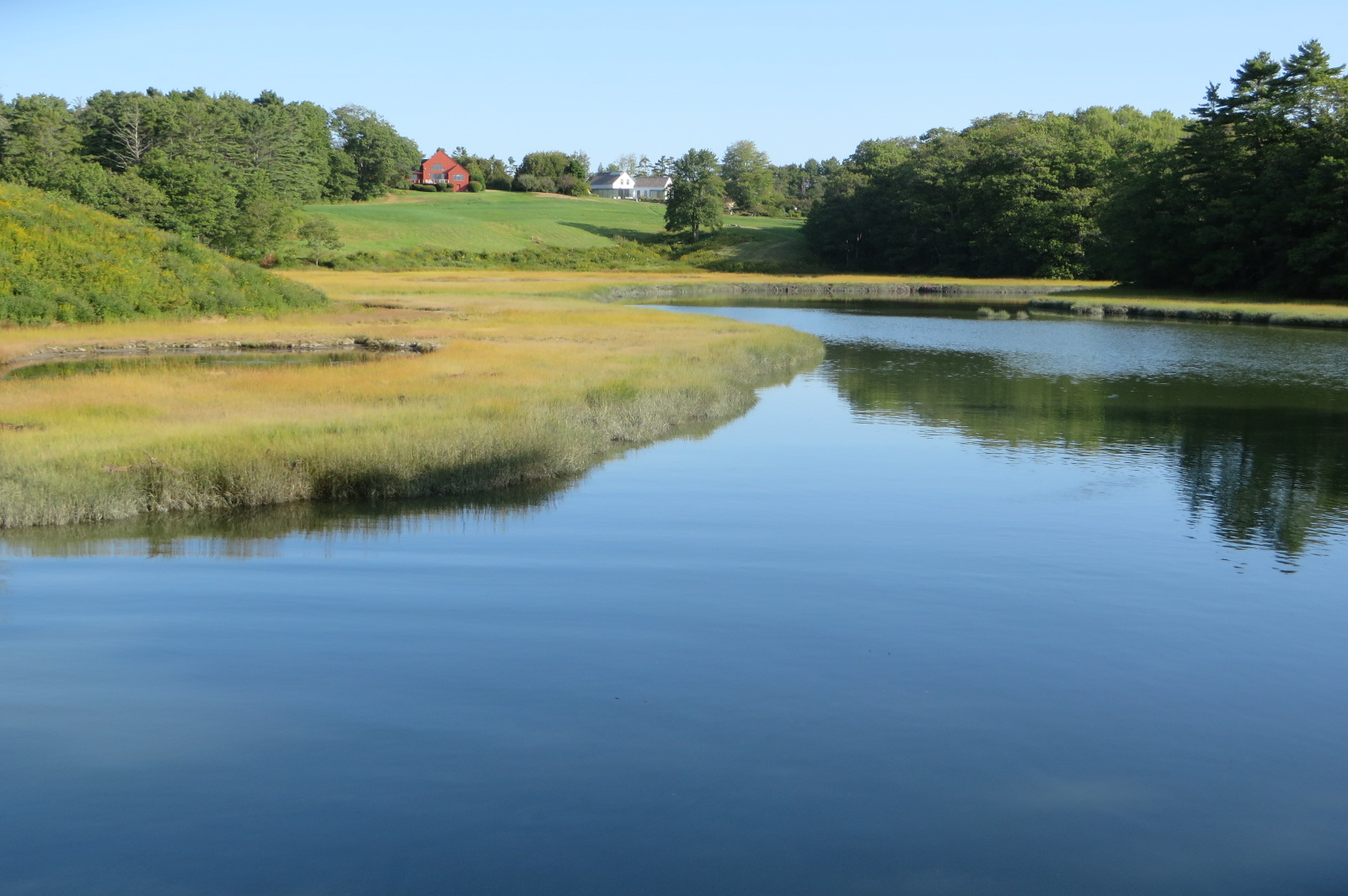
- The Little River at high tide

Location
- Country: United States

Physical characteristics
- Source
  - location: Brunswick, Maine, U.S.
- Mouth
  - location: Casco Bay, Freeport, Maine, U.S.
- Length: 4.1 mi (6.6 km)

Little River is a 4.1-mile-long (6.6 km) tributary of Casco Bay in Maine, United States.

The river's source is around 0.4 miles (0.64 km) west of Highland Road in Brunswick. It flows southwest, passing beneath Newfield Road, Flying Point Road and, at its mouth, Burnett Road in Freeport.

Just northeast of its mouth at Casco Bay, a 60-foot-long (18 m), single-track steel stringer bridge carries Burnett Road over the river. It was built in 2009 and, as of 2016, an average of 300 vehicles cross it daily.

The shores of Little River are believed to have been seasonal fishing settlements historically.

== Mouth ==
Its mouth is located between Wolfe's Neck Center for Agriculture & the Environment and Wolfe's Neck Woods State Park in Freeport.

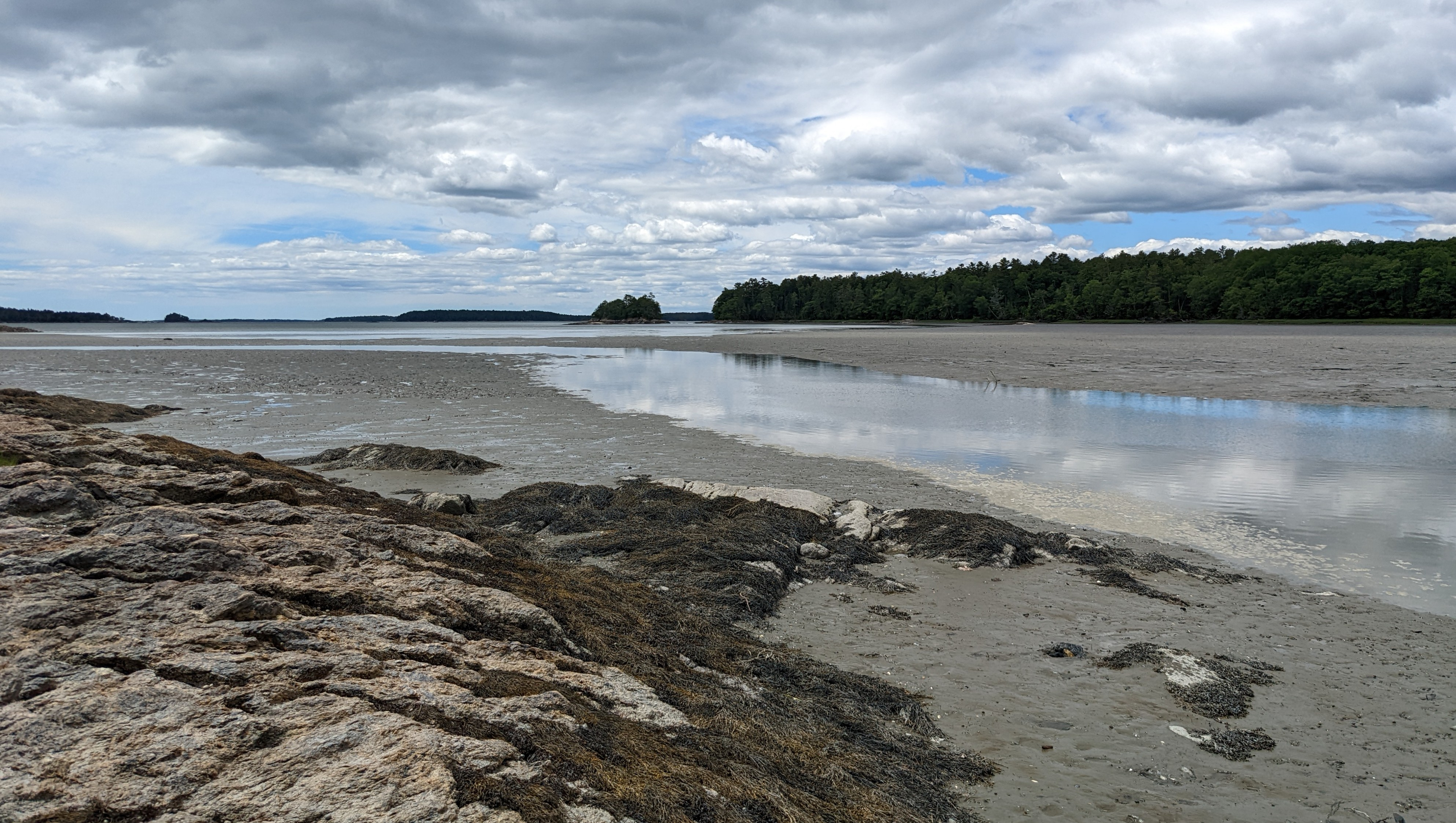
The looking out toward the mouth of the river at Casco Bay

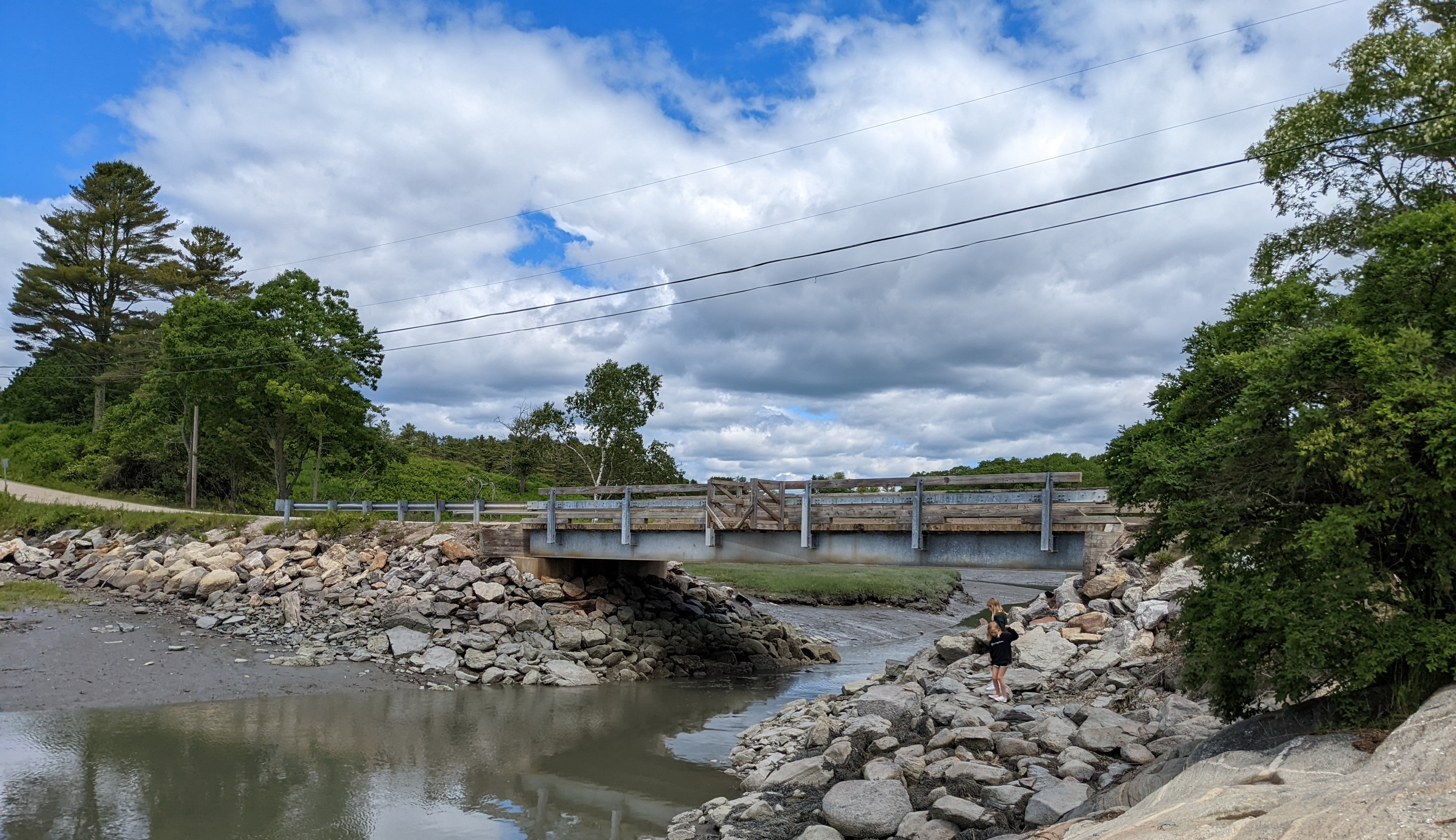
The Burnett Road bridge

== See also ==
- List of rivers of Maine
