= Wolfe's Neck =

Wolfe's Neck may refer to:

- Wolfe's Neck Woods State Park, located in Freeport, Maine, USA
- Wolfe's Neck Farm, located near the above state park
