= John Reinhart =

American poet

John Reinhart (born 1981) is an American writer and editor of speculative poetry and fiddle and guitar musician in the Texas style of fiddling. His poems have appeared in print and online publications internationally. A member of the Science Fiction Poetry Association, he is the current editor of the association's quarterly print journal, Star*Line.

Reinhart describes himself as an arsonist, which stems from his "hope to set fire to the imaginations and aspirations of (his) students," though he also says "he has encouraged his children to play with matches from an early age."

== Education ==
A Denver native, Reinhart graduated from the Denver Waldorf High School before earning his BA from Hampshire College in Amherst, Massachusetts. Before returning to teach at the Waldorf School in Denver, Reinhart received his Master's Degree in education from Antioch University New England. After teaching at DWHS for 11 years, Reinhart moved to Maine, where he currently teaches humanities at Maine Coast Waldorf School.

== Writing career ==
Reinhart "burst on the speculative poetry scene", with his work appearing in a variety of speculative venues in 2014, winning the 2016 Dark Poetry Scholarship from the Horror Writers Association.

He served as a Frequent Contributor at the Songs of Eretz Poetry Review from January 2016 to December 2017. In addition to his writing, Reinhart edited issue 25 of Eye to the Telescope. He also served as the Science Fiction Poetry Association Annual Contest Chair in 2020. He served as the poetry judge for the Topsham, Maine Public Library Joy of the Pen Contest in 2020. Reinhart is the current editor of Star*Line.

Reinhart launched Poetry Across Maine in 2024, which collects poems submitted online about specific locations in Maine "which will serve as a reflection of Maine as it stands in this moment of climate and population flux, a living document of how people in Maine experience and reflect on our state as a place."

Reinhart's poem every, published by Quatrain.Fish was nominated for a Pushcart Prize in 2017. He has won the Poetry Nook weekly contest seven times, in weeks 46, 50, 55, 60, 64, 70, and 74. He has also received honorable mentions for his poetry in the 2019 Topsham Public Library Joy of the Pen Contest, and his nonfiction in the 2020 and 2022 Topsham Public Library Joy of the Pen Contest.

== Musical career ==
Reinhart collaborates with his brother, Patrick to form The Reinhart Brothers, a fiddle and tenor guitar duo that has released Satan Takes a Holiday...with The Reinhart Brothers, and FlimFlams in Your JimJams.

Reinhart studied fiddle under former national fiddle champion, Chris Daring, and is a former Colorado State Young Adult Fiddle Champion and multiple time Colorado State Rhythm Guitar Champion.

== Bibliography ==
- Diamond Psalms. Arson Press, 2023
- Horrific Punctuation. Arson Press, 2021
- Arson. NightBallet Press, 2018
- dig it. Arson Press, 2018
- screaming. Lion Tamer Press, 2017
- broken bottle of time. Alban Lake, 2017
- invert the helix. Pski's Porch, 2017
- Horrific Punctuation. Tiger's Eye Press, 2017
- encircled Prolific Press, 2016

== Discography ==
- Redeemed by Four Strings
- FlimFlams in Your JimJams
