= E. B. Mallett Office Building =

Historic place in Maine, United States

- U.S. National Register of Historic Places
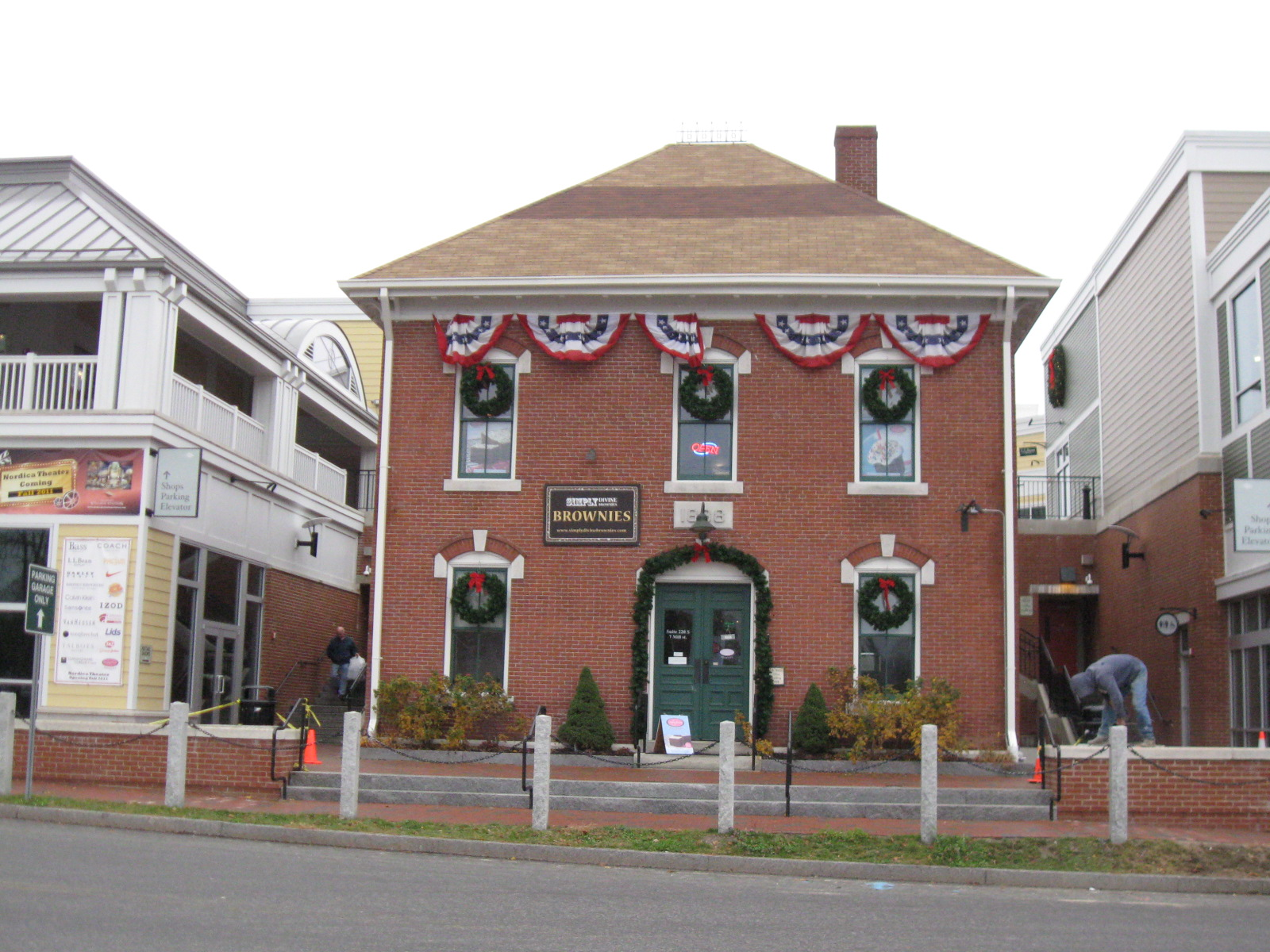

- Location within Maine Location within the United States
- Location: Mill St., Freeport, Maine
- Coordinates: 43°51′22″N 70°6′13″W
- Area: 0.3 acres (0.12 ha)
- Built: 1888
- Architect: Francis H. Fassett
- Architectural style: Italianate
- NRHP reference No.: 82000747
- Added to NRHP: February 19, 1982

The E.B. Mallett Office Building is a historic commercial building on Mill Street in Freeport, Maine. Now part of the Freeport Village Station shopping complex, it is an Italianate brick building constructed in 1888 and designed by Portland architect Francis Fassett for Freeport's leading businessman of the period. It was listed on the National Register of Historic Places in 1982.

== Description and history ==
The Mallett Office Building stands on the east side of Mill Street, at its intersection with Depot Street, now an access road separating the Freeport Village Station shopping complex to the east, and its parking area to the west. The building is surrounded on three sides by modern elements of the complex, which it is now part of. It is a two-story masonry structure, built out of brick with granite trim. It has a high hip roof and a single chimney. The main facade is three bays wide, with a central entrance flanked by sash windows. The windows have granite sills and hoods with granite keystones and ears.

The building was erected in 1888 to a design by Portland architect Francis Fassett, for Freeport businessman Edmund Buxton Mallett Jr. Mallett was a transformative force in Freeport's economy, building shoe factories, a sawmill, grist mill, and coal yard, in addition to the granite quarry and brickyard that produced the materials used in construction of this building. These businesses were instrumental in shifting Freeport's economy from one based on coastal maritime pursuits.

== See also ==
- National Register of Historic Places listings in Cumberland County, Maine
