= Trackless train =

Passenger transportation vehicle

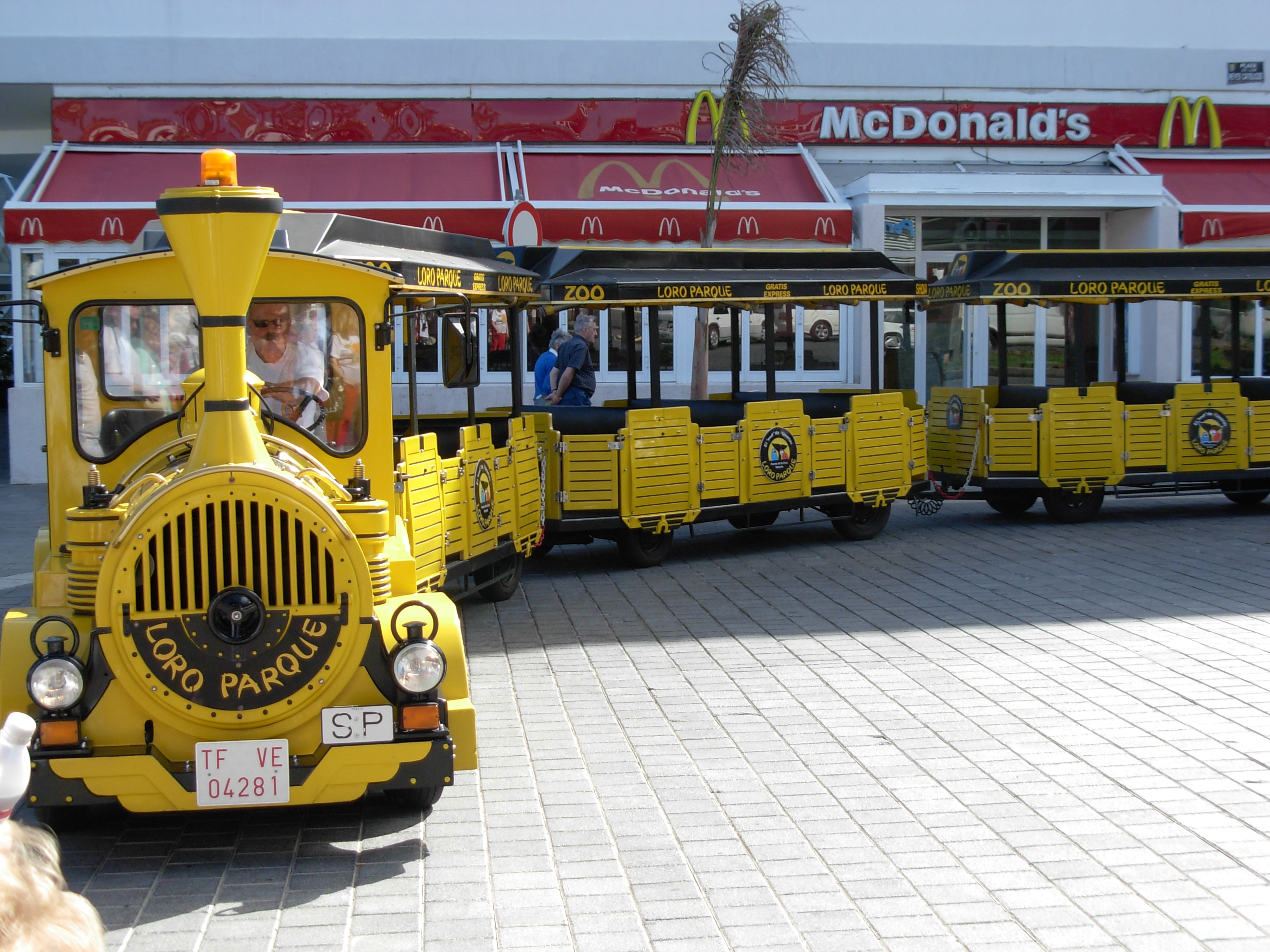
A trackless train for tourists in Tenerife

A trackless train — or tram (U.S. English), road train, land train, or parking lot train is a road-going articulated vehicle used for the transport of passengers, comprising a driving vehicle pulling one or more carriages connected by drawbar couplings, in the manner of a road-going railway train. Similar vehicles may be used for transport of freight or baggage for short distances, such as at a factory or airport. Often depending on use, land train may or may not be skeuomorphically styled to look like traditional, often steam trains.

== Terminology ==
Trackless train or land train are descriptive terms for the rubber tired road-going vehicles to distinguish them from rail mounted trains. Parking lot tram is a common name in the US, reflecting its use in parking lot transport.

The lack of a widely accepted generic name for trackless trains often leads to them being called trams, people movers or road trains. Due to cultural terminology differences, trackless train, tram and parking lot tram usages occur in North America, while land train and road train are used in Europe.

== Technology ==
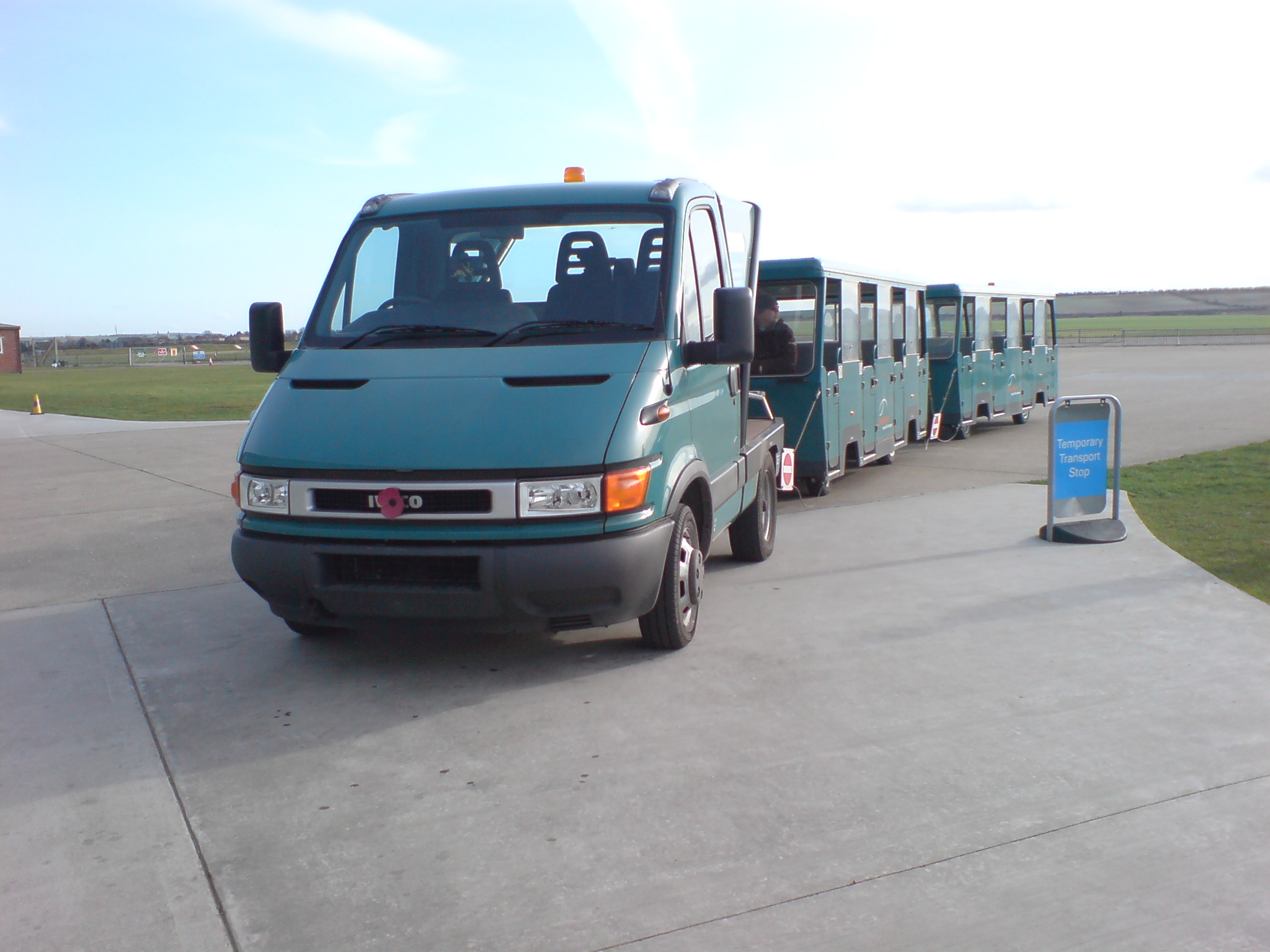
Van-hauled trackless train at the Imperial War Museum Duxford, England

A trackless train usually consists of a tractor unit pulling a number of articulated trailers or carriages in the manner of a locomotive-hauled railway train. The tractor unit can be powered by an internal combustion engine or an electric motor. Trackless trains using human power are generally driven not only by the tractor but also by the carriages.

Carriages may seat between 6 and 40 persons, and can be roofed or not, featuring open or closed sides and various levels of interior comfort such as padded seats. If open, depending on climate they may feature plastic or fiberglass corrugated panels overhead, to divert rain and provide some measure of shade. Alternative designs may use a cloth awning overhead for similar purposes.

Carriages usually contain latchable doors or chains to act as safety measures to prevent exit while in motion. Carriages and tractor false bodies may be constructed in fiberglass or aluminum, and may feature levelling suspension.

As in a regular road vehicle, the tractor unit is steered through the front wheels by a steering wheel or handle bar operated by a human driver, and powered by its rear single or double axle. The following carriages are then steered through the drawbar couplings between the carriages. Simple trains with few carriages or short in overall length may feature single- or double-axle carriages with just front-axle steering only. Larger or longer trains feature four-wheel steering by way of mechanical linkages. Four-wheel steering ensures that longer trains need less side clearance while turning, as the carriages are able to maintain the same path, describing a constant radius of arc. This adds to the impression of the vehicle being on rails. The drawbar connections of more complex trains may feature a shock absorber to mitigate the effect of acceleration or braking.

Thuner Trampelwurm: path of the complete road train turning left 90°

The longest trackless trains appear to be human-powered ones. In 2007 a train of 93 tricycles was assembled and ridden for the purpose of setting a world record. The train was formed by removing the single front wheels of the tricycles used as carriages and attaching their forks to the tricycle in front. This system developed for Hase tricycles and others also allows the ad-hoc formation of shorter trains for practical use. The longest permanently set up human-powered trackless train is probably the Thuner Trampelwurm consisting of a tricycle as tractor with 10 driven trailers as carriages, in operation as a tourist attraction in the city of Thun since 1994. The chosen geometry of the trailer linkages result in good tracking at the cost of a low maximum speed, about 10 km/h (6.2 mph) without shimmy.

== Public uses ==
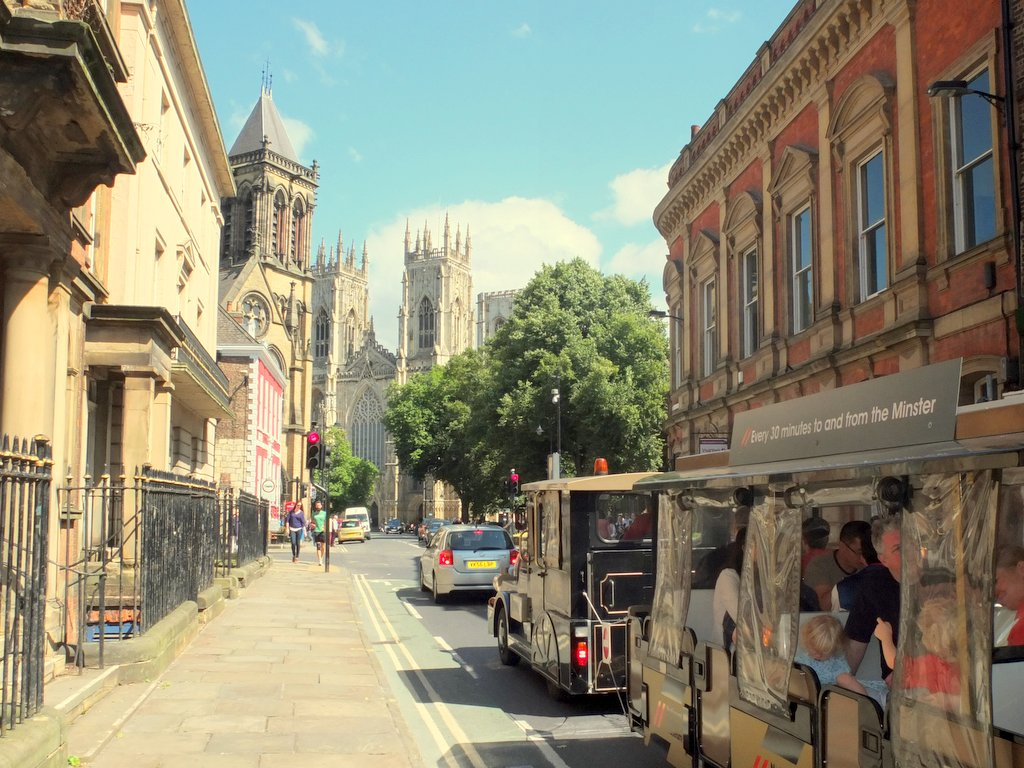
A trackless train service for tourists in the city of York, England

Trackless trains are often used for the transport of tourists instead of other public transport modes. These may be seasonal services, linking attractions such as museums and zoos or other tourist destinations with central areas. Often, the train ride itself is a tourist attraction, offering sightseeing along scenic routes as well as a transport service. In the Swiss town of Gruyères, a trackless train is the only vehicle allowed in the pedestrianized streets. A similar train is also used to move students between the train station and the faculties in the Outer Alcalá de Henares University Campus.

Trackless trains are also used in shopping malls to entertain children while their parents are shopping. Trackless trains used for this purpose are commonly smaller and have less power.

A larger and faster form of trackless tram is the rubber-tyred tram used as a public transport alternative to conventional light rail, tram and bus.

In some countries in Europe a Volkswagen minibus usually carries 3 carriages, these trackless trains can often carry only 38 passengers.

== Private/Theme park uses ==
Trackless trains are also often operated for the exclusive use of customers of resorts or amusement parks, both as internal transport systems entirely within their premises either from parking areas and between attractions, or as rides in themselves. A particularly heavy user of trackless trains has been the Walt Disney Parks and Resorts where they are used to move guests between the outlying parking lots and the park entrances. 16 trams reside at Disneyland Resort, and 28 trams reside at Walt Disney World Resort. Universal, and other movie studio theme parks also use trackless trains on their studio backlot tours. Purdue University has the Boilermaker Special as its mascot.

== Appearance ==
While some trackless trains are functional or modern in appearance, many are often constructed with false bodywork and are painted to look like nineteenth century steam locomotives. Others may feature decorative or fun paint schemes to appeal to children. Certain models of trackless train may look the same as narrow-gauge rail guided amusement park trains, due to the common manufacture of both vehicles. Some fifth wheel coupled trailer buses may also be similarly decorated.

== Airport baggage trains ==
Mechanized baggage trains−trams, used at airport terminals, have steering mechanisms similar to those on longer trackless trains, although the tractor units are commonly designed to be frequently detached from the baggage carts, to be used for other purposes. Individual baggage carts are also quickly detachable for parking in loading−unloading areas. Airport baggage trains are often also much longer than the passenger type.

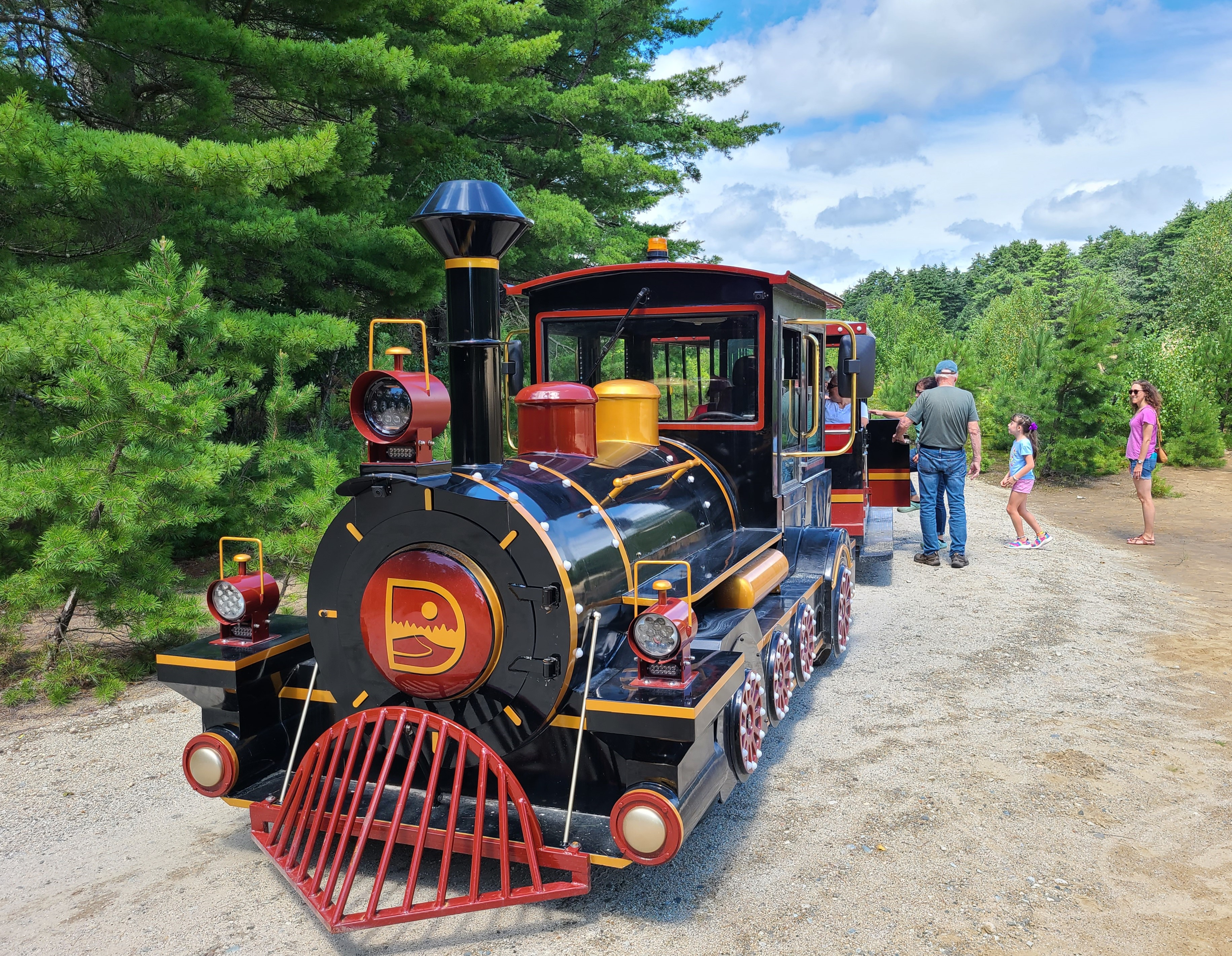
Trackless Train at the Desert of Maine

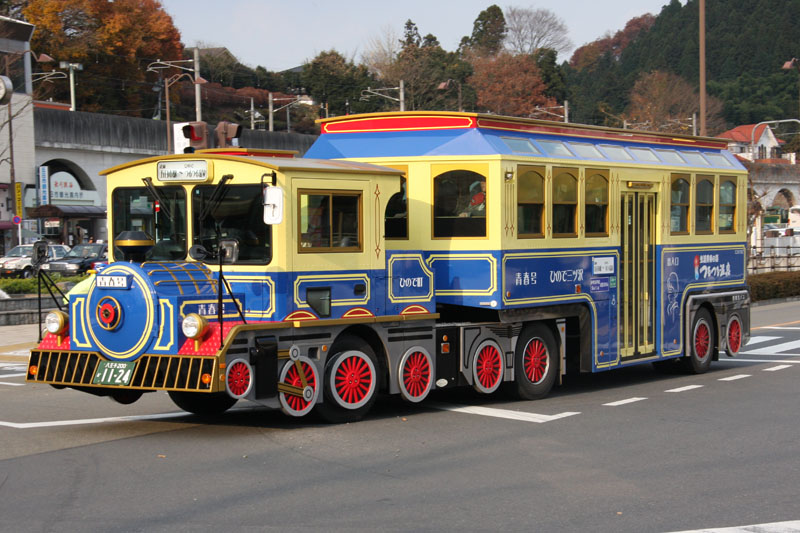
A Hino Ranger semi-trailer bus in Japan

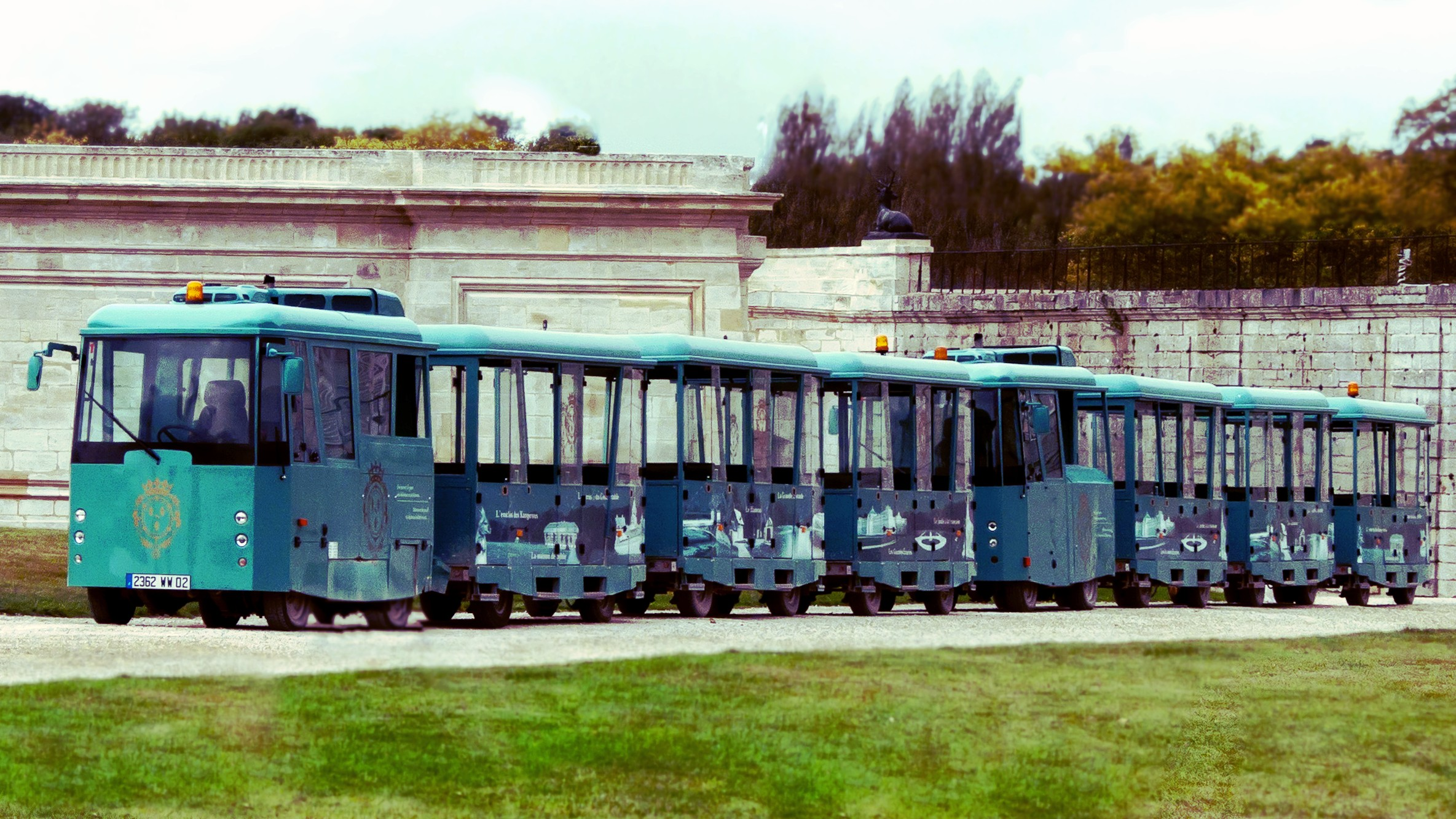
Two visitor 'trains' at the castle of Chantilly, France

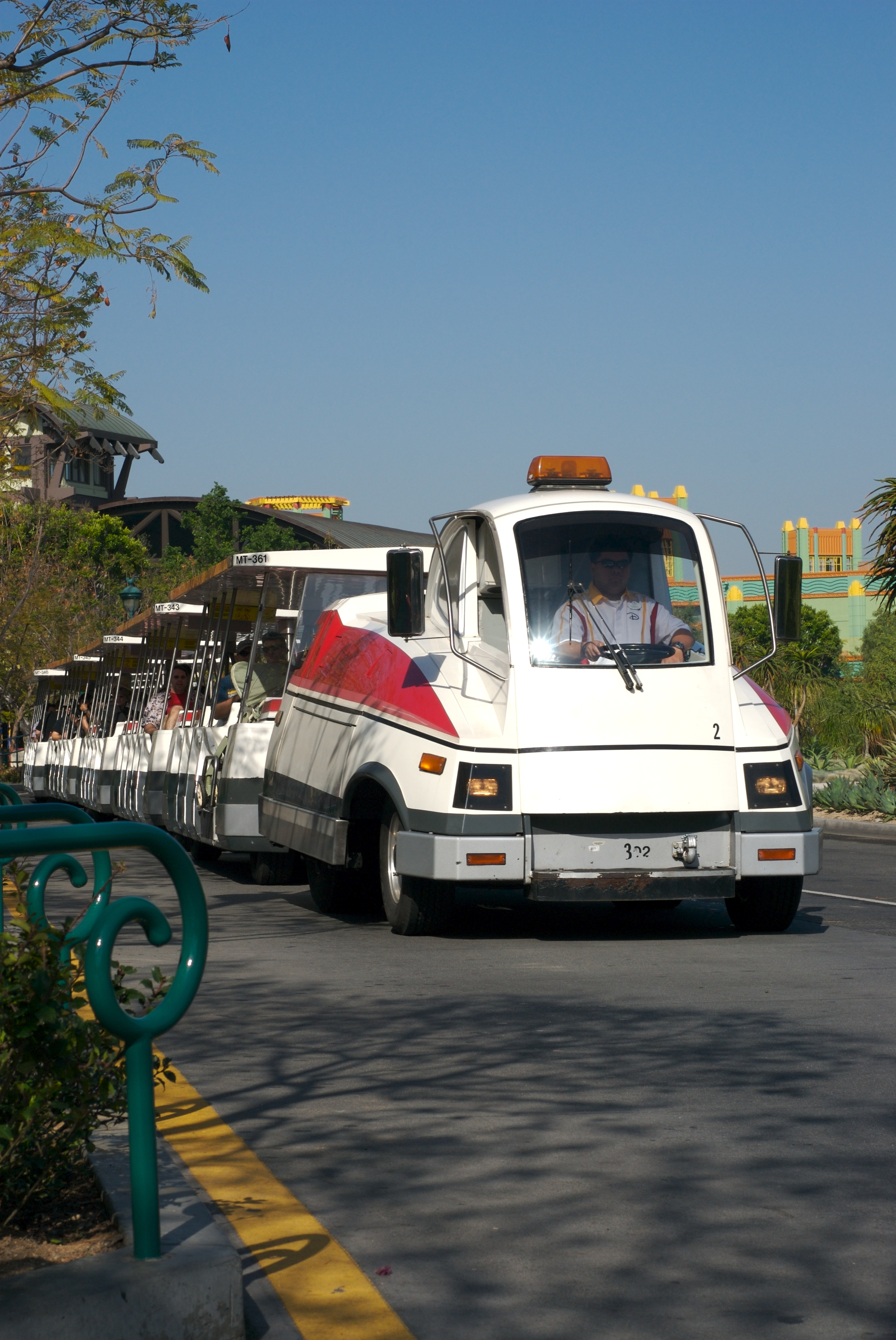
Parking lot tram at Disneyland, California

== See also ==
- Autonomous Rail Rapid Transit
- Guided bus
- Rubber-tyred trams
- Overland train
- Tourist trolley
