= Freeport Village Station =

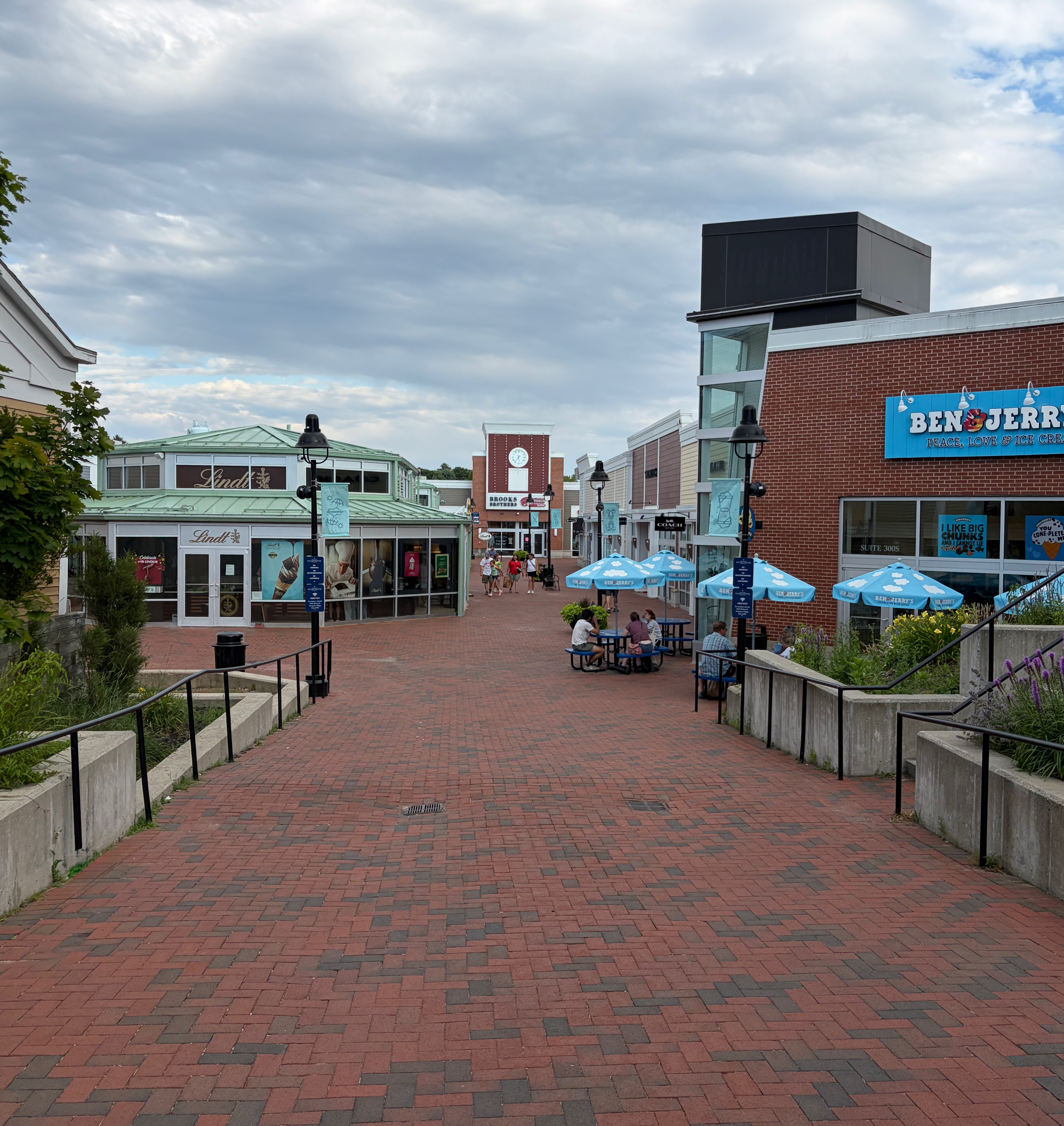
- Pictured in 2026
- Location: Freeport, Maine, U.S.
- Coordinates: 43.856431°N 70.102618°W
- Opened: 2009 (17 years ago)
- Floor area: 122,121 square feet (11,345.4 m^{2})
- Floors: 2 (including one level of parking)
- Parking: 500
- Website: www.freeportvillagestation.com

Freeport Village Station is a 3.5-acre (1.4 ha) outdoor shopping mall in Freeport, Maine, United States. Established in 2009, it is bounded by Main Street (U.S. Route 1) to the west, Bow Street to the north, Depot Street to the south and Depot Street and Mill Street to the east. An L.L. Bean outlet, located directly across from the company's flagship campus, is one of its stores. The E. B. Mallett Office Building, constructed in 1888, stands at the southern edge of the complex, on Depot Street at its intersection with Mill Street. Nordica, the complex's movie theater, closed in 2020 but was leased to a new owner, Patriot Cinemas, in early 2026. Patriot Cinemas operated Nickelodeon Cinema in Portland.

The complex includes a 500-car parking garage on its lower level.

In 2024, Freeport Village Station was auctioned off for $20 million as part of a foreclosure, due to its developers, Berenson, being in breach of contract. It came under the management of The Wilder Company a few months later.

== Transportation ==
Freeport's Amtrak station is situated a few feet south of Village Station, across Depot Street.
