= Mann Cemetery =

Cemetery in Cumberland County, Maine, US

- The blue markers denote what are believed to be burials
- Interactive map of Mann Cemetery

Details
- Established: c. 1750 (closed to burials in 1922)
- Location: Off Lower Flying Point Road; Freeport, Maine
- Country: United States
- Coordinates: 43°50′00″N 70°02′59″W
- Type: Private
- Owned by: Mann Cemetery Association
- Size: 0.5 acres (0.20 ha)
- No. of graves: est. 160
- Find a Grave: Mann Cemetery

Mann Cemetery is an historic cemetery located in Freeport, Maine, United States. It was established around 1750 and was closed to burials in 1922.

There are around 160 burials, most in unmarked graves. Dozens of blue plastic markers denote what are believed to be burials. The Mann family plot is surrounded by barbed wire, outside of which members of at least ten other families are buried.

A dispute arose in 2016 with L.L.Bean, who purchased property, on the adjacent Marietta Lane, for their paddling center from a Mann family relative thirteen years earlier. The construction meant the "centuries-old" tote road that was used to access the cemetery had to be dug up to install drainage. While Mann Cemetery Association, which was established in 2011, had a secondary access road, it was through a private gated road that was only opened to the public in late 2018. Residents and descendants of those interred in the cemetery demanded that L.L. Bean rebuild the track to re-establish public access to the cemetery.

== Gallery ==
This formerly private access road was opened to the public in 2018. It is approximately 0.6 miles to the cemetery from Lower Flying Point Road

The known-burial locations

The entrance on Lower Flying Point Road
