= Jameson Tavern =

Historic tavern in Maine, United States

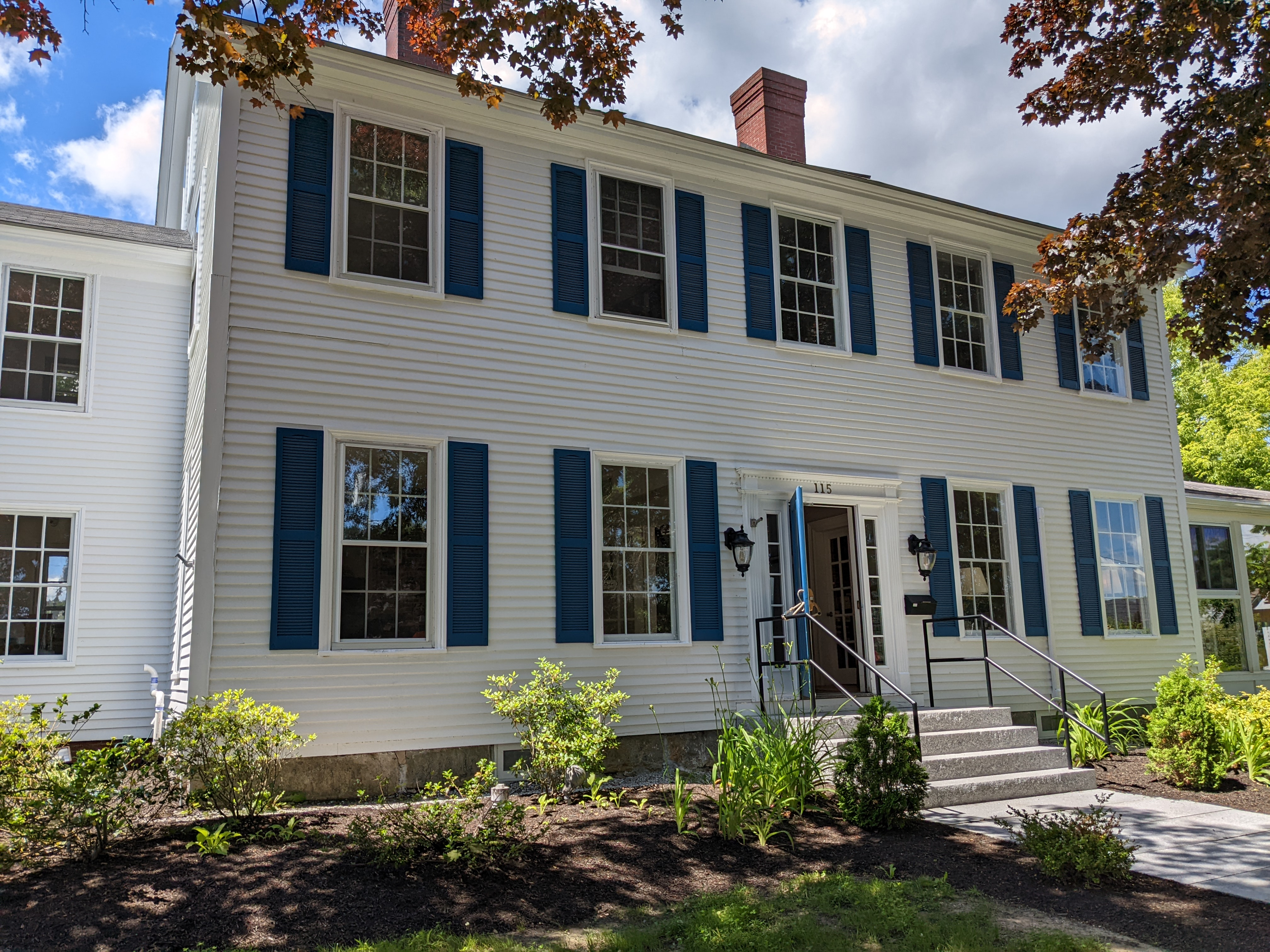
- The facade of the main building in 2022
- Former names: Codman's Tavern

General information
- Architectural style: Colonial
- Location: Freeport, Maine, U.S., 115 Main Street
- Coordinates: 43.85825°N 70.10271°W
- Current tenants: King's Head Pub, Double Barrel Spirits, Grande Burrito
- Completed: 1779 (247 years ago)

Technical details
- Floor count: 2
- Floor area: Approx. 8,000 sq ft

Jameson Tavern is a historic building on Main Street in Freeport, Maine, United States. It was completed in 1779 as a home for physician Dr. John Anglier Hyde, a decade before the town was incorporated and when it was part of North Yarmouth, then in Massachusetts. It stands across Justin's Way from L.L.Bean's flagship store.

It became an important meeting place during the discussions regarding the District of Maine's separation from Massachusetts in the early 19th century. It is believed that representatives of the Joint Commission of Massachusetts and Maine met on the second floor of the building ("in its northeastern corner") in 1820 to sign the final papers giving Maine its independence, thus giving it the claim that it is the "birthplace of Maine." The Daughters of the American Revolution installed a plaque on the property in 1914 which describes these events. The Freeport Historical Society, however, says that it has found no record that the commissioners ever met in town.

Poets Henry Wadsworth Longfellow and John Greenleaf Whittier are said to have visited the tavern, as well as President Franklin Pierce.

The property was built by Dr. John Anglier Hyde. Shortly after the home's completion, it was sold to Captain Samuel Jameson (1766–1814) who ran it as a tavern between 1801 and 1828, when his widow sold it.

The tavern became Codman's Tavern in 1828. Richard Codman was the proprietor for 28 years, at which point it was purchased by John Cushing, a local shipbuilder.

It later became known as Jameson Tavern once again. The tavern closed in 2013, but later reopened. It was put on the market in 2019. In November 2024, owner Tom Hincks announced its closure.

== Later occupants ==
As of October 2026, Grande Burrito, a Mexican restaurant, occupies the front portion of the building, including the Jameson Tavern's former formal dining room. In 2025, King's Head, a sister pub of that in Portland, opened in the former tavern space.

== Gallery ==
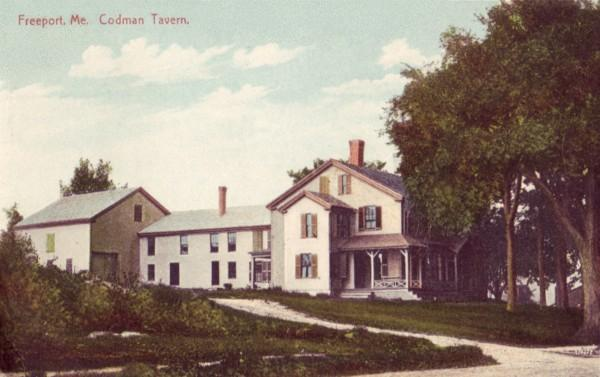
The main building, its rear wing, and barn in 1915

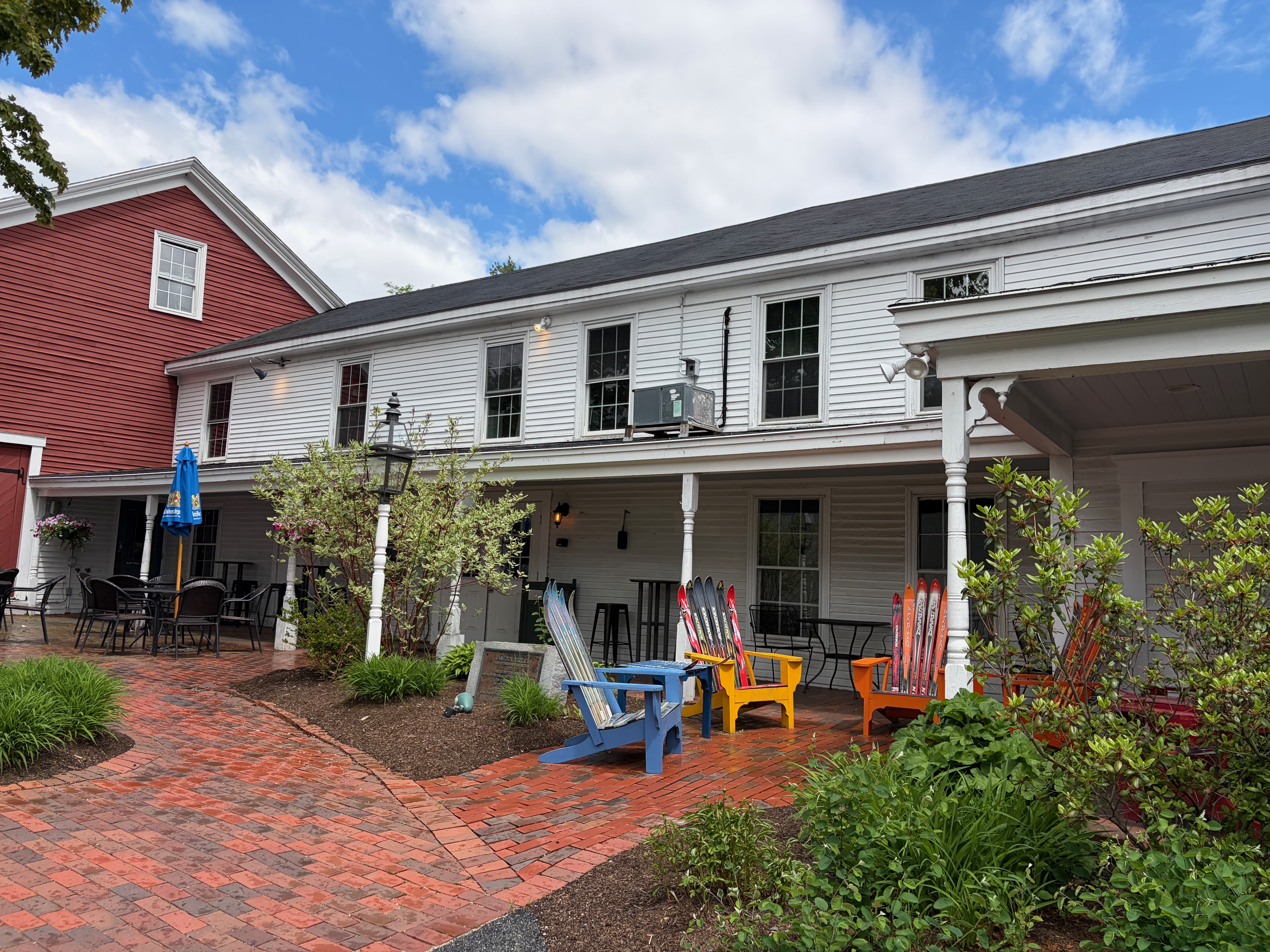
And in 2026

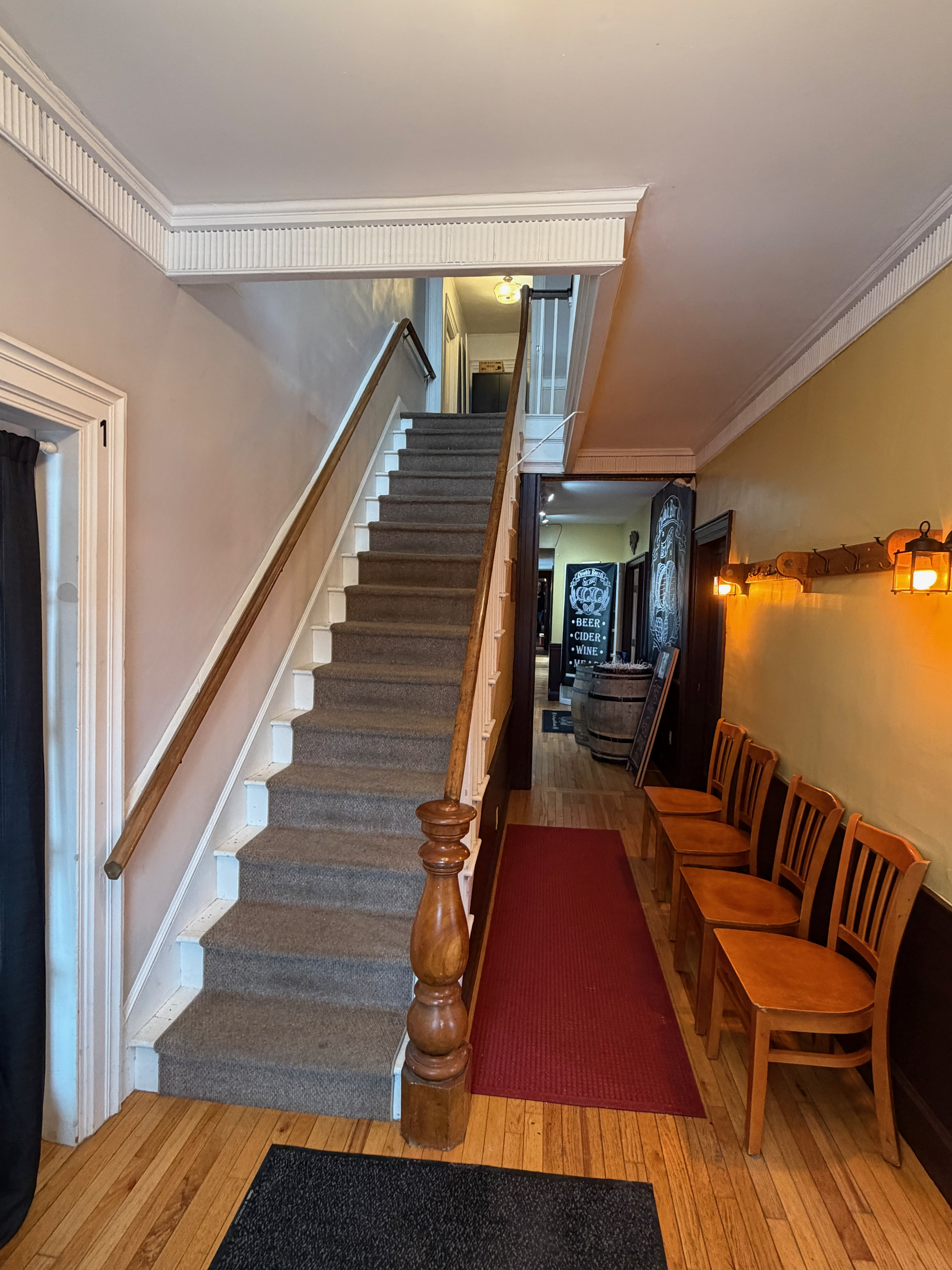
Hallway inside main entrance

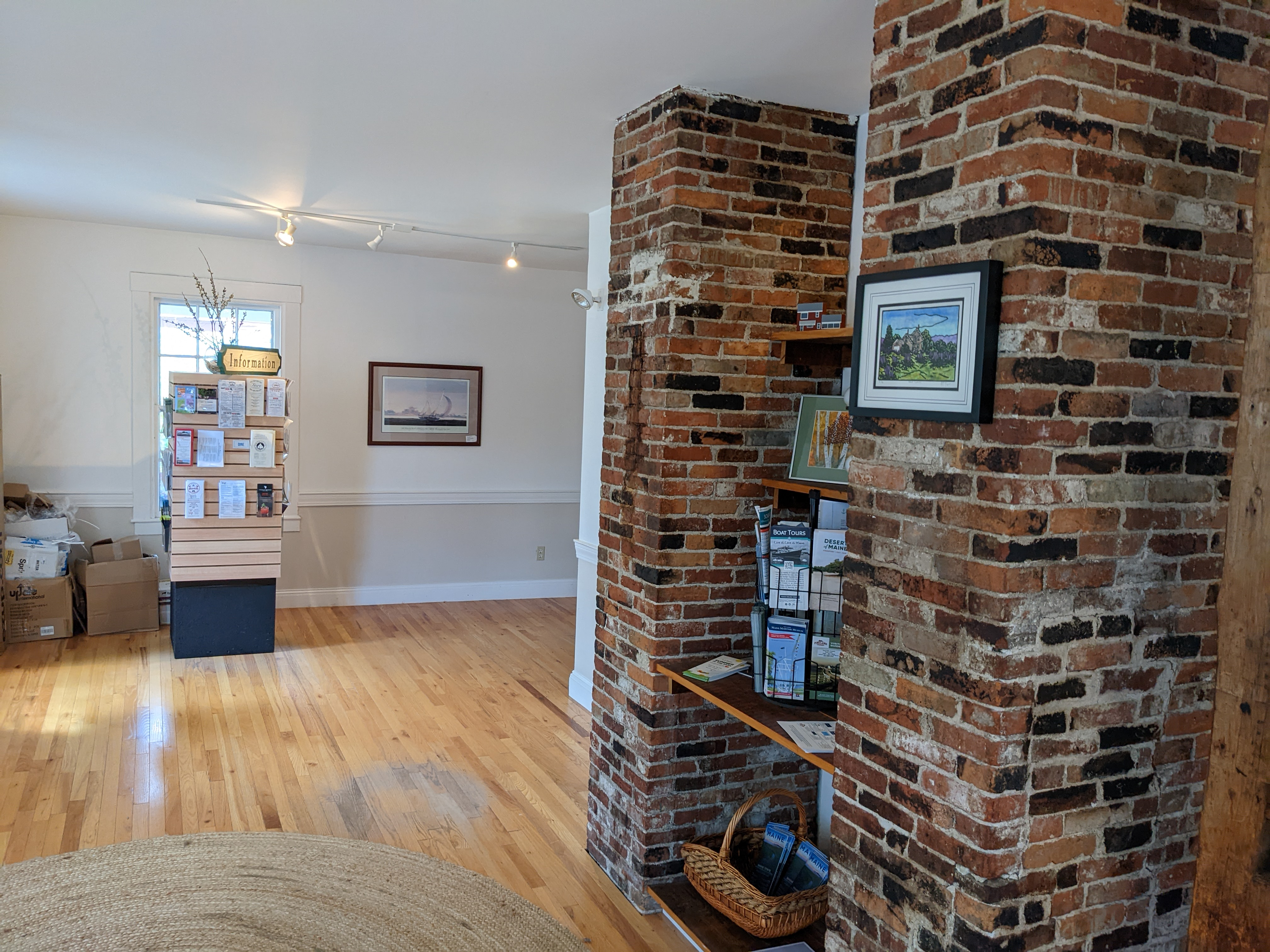
The southern end of the main building's first floor
