= Edward C. Plummer =

American author and historian

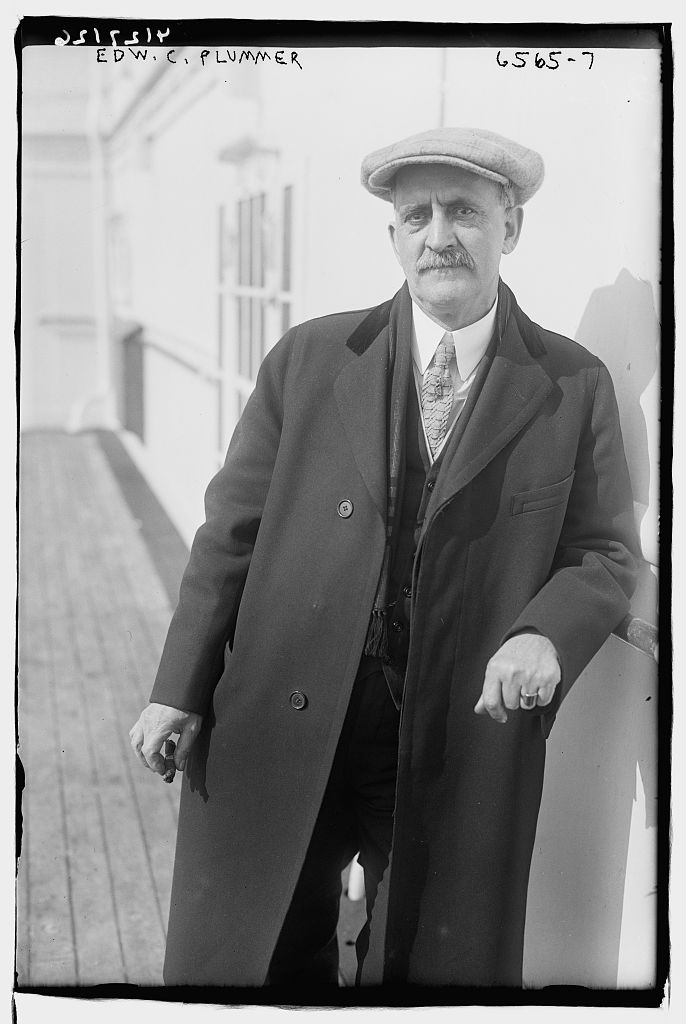
- Plummer in 1926
- Born: November 23, 1863; Freeport, Maine, U.S.
- Died: March 20, 1932 (aged 68); Washington, D.C., U.S.
- Resting place: Arlington National Cemetery, Arlington, Virginia, U.S.
- Education: Bowdoin College
- Occupations: Author, historian
- Notable work: Reminiscences of a Yarmouth Schoolboy (1926); The Edward Clarence Plummer History of Bath, Maine (1936)
- Board member of: Bath Board of Trade

Edward Clarence Plummer (November 23, 1863 – March 20, 1932) was an American author and historian from Freeport, Maine. He wrote several books on the history of Maine towns and cities, including Yarmouth and Bath.

== Early life and career ==
Plummer was born in 1863 in Freeport, Maine, to Solomon Hayford Plummer and Ruth Bucknell (Harding). He attended North Yarmouth Academy, and also lived in Bath, where he worked in the city's shipyards to fund his college years.

He graduated from Bowdoin College in 1887, after which he worked as a newspaperman for Bath's Daily Times.

In 1898, the year preceding the death of his father, Plummer started to practice admiralty law. He joined the U.S. Navy, for which he was employed as an assistant paymaster.

In 1921, he became a member of the U.S. Shipping Board, and was its vice-president from 1923.

Plummer published his first book, Reminiscences of a Yarmouth Schoolboy, in 1926. He went on to publish several more before his death in 1932. Two books were published posthumously: Ancient Augusta: a Novel from History (1932) and The Edward Clarence Plummer History of Bath, Maine (1936), the latter written by Henry Wilson Owen.

== Death ==
Plummer died in 1932, aged 68, while in Washington, D.C. His funeral took place at the United States Capitol, and he was interred in Arlington National Cemetery.

== Personal life ==
Plummer married Bangor native Lillian Gertrude Fiske in 1888. She survived Plummer by eight years, and was interred beside him upon her death.

== Selected bibliography ==
A selection of books authored by Plummer:

- Reminiscences of a Yarmouth Schoolboy (1926)
- Shipping Sense: a Compilation of Certain Addresses (1926)
- True Tales of the Sea, 1864–1898 (1930)
- Ancient Augusta: a Novel from History (1932) (posthumously)
- The Edward Clarence Plummer History of Bath, Maine (1936) (posthumously)
