= Pine Tree Academy =

Location
- 67 Pownal Road; Freeport, Maine 04032-5711; United States; 43°51′47″N 70°06′54″W

Information
- Type: Christian, Day, Boarding
- Motto: "Ye are the light of the world." Matthew 5:14
- Religious affiliation: Seventh-day Adventist
- Established: 1961 (modern); 1921 (historical)
- Principal: Brendan Krueger
- Faculty: 12
- Grades: K-12
- Enrollment: 136 total
- Average class size: 11 students
- Student to teacher ratio: 11:1
- Campus: Suburban, 81 acre
- Colors: Blue and white
- Athletics: 3 sports
- Team name: The Breakers
- Website: www.pinetreeacademy.org

Pine Tree Academy (also known as Pine Tree or PTA) is a Seventh-day Adventist, co-educational University preparatory school for boarding and day students in grades K–12. It is a part of the Seventh-day Adventist education system, the world's second largest Christian school system. The school is located in Freeport, Maine, north of Portland.

Pine Tree Academy was founded in 1921 on a farm near Auburn, Maine. The school closed in 1933 because of The Depression. In 1961, the academy reopened as Pine Tree Memorial School in Freeport. In 1973, the school began offering all four years of the high school grades. Today, the academy is the oldest academy in the Northern New England Conference of Seventh-day Adventists.

== See also ==
- List of Seventh-day Adventist secondary schools
- Seventh-day Adventist education
