= Freeport =

Freeport, a variant of free port, may refer to:

== Arts, entertainment, and media ==
- Freeport, name of several space stations in the video game Freelancer (2003)
- Freeport, a fictional town in the video game SiN (1998)
- Freeport: The City of Adventure, a role playing game setting by Green Ronin Publishing

== Places ==
=== United States ===
- Freeport, California
- Freeport, Florida
- Freeport, Illinois
- Freeport, Indiana
- Freeport, Iowa
- Freeport, Kansas
- Freeport, Maine
  - Freeport (CDP), Maine
- Freeport, Michigan
- Freeport, Minnesota
- Freeport, New York
- Freeport, Ohio
- Freeport, Pennsylvania
- Freeport, Texas
- Freeport, West Virginia

=== Elsewhere ===
- Freeport, Bahamas
- Freeport, Nova Scotia, Canada
- Freeport Tortuga, Haiti
- Freeport, Trinidad and Tobago

== Railway stations ==
- Braintree Freeport railway station, a railway station in Braintree, Essex, England, United Kingdom
- Freeport (LIRR station), a Long Island Rail Road Station in Freeport, New York, United States
- Freeport station (Illinois), a proposed railway station in Freeport, Illinois, United States
- Freeport station (Maine), an Amtrak station in Freeport, Maine, United States

== Other uses ==
- Free port, a special economic zone
- Freeport Doctrine, articulated by Stephen A. Douglas at the 1858 Lincoln–Douglas debate in Freeport, Illinois
- Freeport-McMoRan, a mining company operating in the Americas, Indonesia, and Spain
