= American Farmland Trust =

US nonprofit organization

American Farmland Trust (AFT) is a national non-profit organization based in Washington, D.C dedicated to protecting farmland, the promotion of environmentally sound farming practices, and the support of farmers and ranchers across the United States. Founded in 1980 by a coalition of farmers and conservationists, AFT was one of the nation's first agricultural land trusts and remains the only one with a national scope. Its work spans policy advocacy, land conservation, and technical assistance, with regional offices supporting local efforts.

AFT is governed by a board of directors and supported by a team of farmers, scientists, policy experts, and researchers. In partnership with the USDA's Natural Resources Conservation Service, it operates the Farmland Information Center, a centralized resource for data and best practices on farmland protection and stewardship.

== History ==
American Farmland Trust (AFT) was founded in 1980 by farmers and conservationists including Margaret (Peggy) Rockefeller, Patrick Noonan and William K. Reilly. Norm Berg, former Chief of the Soil Conservation Service (now the Natural Resources Conservation Service), was an AFT senior advisor for 25 years. Otto C. Doering III, a member of the Intergovernmental Panel on Climate Change, won the 2007 Nobel Peace Prize

Jim Moseley, former USDA Deputy Secretary, serve on AFT's board of directors.

AFT was one of the first agricultural land trusts in the nation and is the only one with a national scope. In 1985, AFT protected Wolfe's Neck Farm with an agricultural conservation easement.

In 2000, AFT launched Smart Growth America, a national coalition aimed at reforming development practices to support sustainable land use and preserve working farmland. Initially created under AFT's umbrella, the initiative has brought together stakeholders from environmental groups to urban planners.

AFT helped create state and local land trusts throughout the country including the Colorado Cattlemen's Agricultural Land Trust in 1995 and the Texas Agricultural Land Trust in 2006.

In 2012, with the Electric Power Research Institute and an expert advisory committee, AFT launched the first and largest water quality credit trading program in the United States to improve water quality in the Ohio River basin. The program received the U.S. Water Prize in 2015.

AFT leads Farm to Institution New York State (FINYS) which connects New York farms to publicly funded institutions in the state.

AFT promotes farming practices that improve soil health as a way to bring about multiple environmental benefits including carbon sequestration. In 2017, AFT became the first United States Climate Alliance Impact Partner in an effort to implement policies and programs that "sequester carbon and reduce greenhouse gases on agricultural lands while improving farm resiliency and productivity."

In 2020, AFT launched the Farmer Relief Fund, which provided grants of up to $1,000 to small and mid-size direct-market producers with demonstrated need due to the impact of the COVID-19 pandemic. In the same year, AFT became a national sponsor of the Leopold Conservation Award Program, which recognizes the outstanding achievements of more than 100 voluntary conservationists annually.

== Federal policy ==
AFT has helped shape U.S. farm bills since the 1980s. AFT published the policy document Soil Conservation in America: What Do We Have to Lose? in 1984 and was a member of the conservation coalition that played a significant role in the development of the Food Security Act of 1985 which established the Conservation Reserve Program (CRP). AFT's work as a proponent of the expansion of government-funded agriculture programs led to the passing of the 2002 Farm Bill and the authorization of the Farm and Ranch Lands Protection Program (succeeded by the Agriculture Conservation Easement Program, or ACEP) and the Environmental Quality Incentives Program. AFT advocated to increase funding for the ACEP by supporting the passing of the Agriculture Improvement Act of 2018 which would increase the program's funding by $2 billion over the span of 10 years.
