= Maine Coast Waldorf School =

Location
- 57 Desert Road; Freeport, Maine 04032; United States
- Coordinates: 43°51′09″N 70°08′36″W

Information
- Type: Independent
- Founded: 1984
- Administrator: David Eichler
- Grades: Preschool–12
- Average class size: 18
- Education system: Waldorf
- Newspaper: Tuesday News
- Website: https://www.mainecoastwaldorf.org/

Maine Coast Waldorf School is a Waldorf school for students from early childhood through grade 12. It was founded in 1984 as Merriconeag Waldorf School and changed its name to Maine Coast Waldorf School in 2015. As a Waldorf school, Maine Coast's curricula are based on the educational philosophy of Rudolf Steiner.

Initially offering education for students up to grade 8, Maine Coast Waldorf School began offering high school education in 2007, graduating its first high school class in 2010. The high school received national accreditation in 2012. Maine Coast Waldorf School is a member of and accredited by New England Association of Schools and Colleges (NEASC), the Association of Waldorf Schools of North America (AWSNA), and the Waldorf Early Childhood Association of North America (WECAN).

== High School ==
The high school was temporarily housed on the Pineland campus until the planned high school building was completed in 2017. The building was designed by Portland, Maine architecture firm BRIBURN. It is the first Passive House Certified high school in the North America and the first high school globally certified through PHIUS. The building is also certified as compliant with the Maine Advanced Buildings administered by Efficiency Maine. Additionally, roof mounted Photovoltaics are sized such that building may operate as a Zero-energy building – that is, creating as much energy as it consumes.
