= Desert of Maine =

Tourist attraction in Freeport, Maine, United States

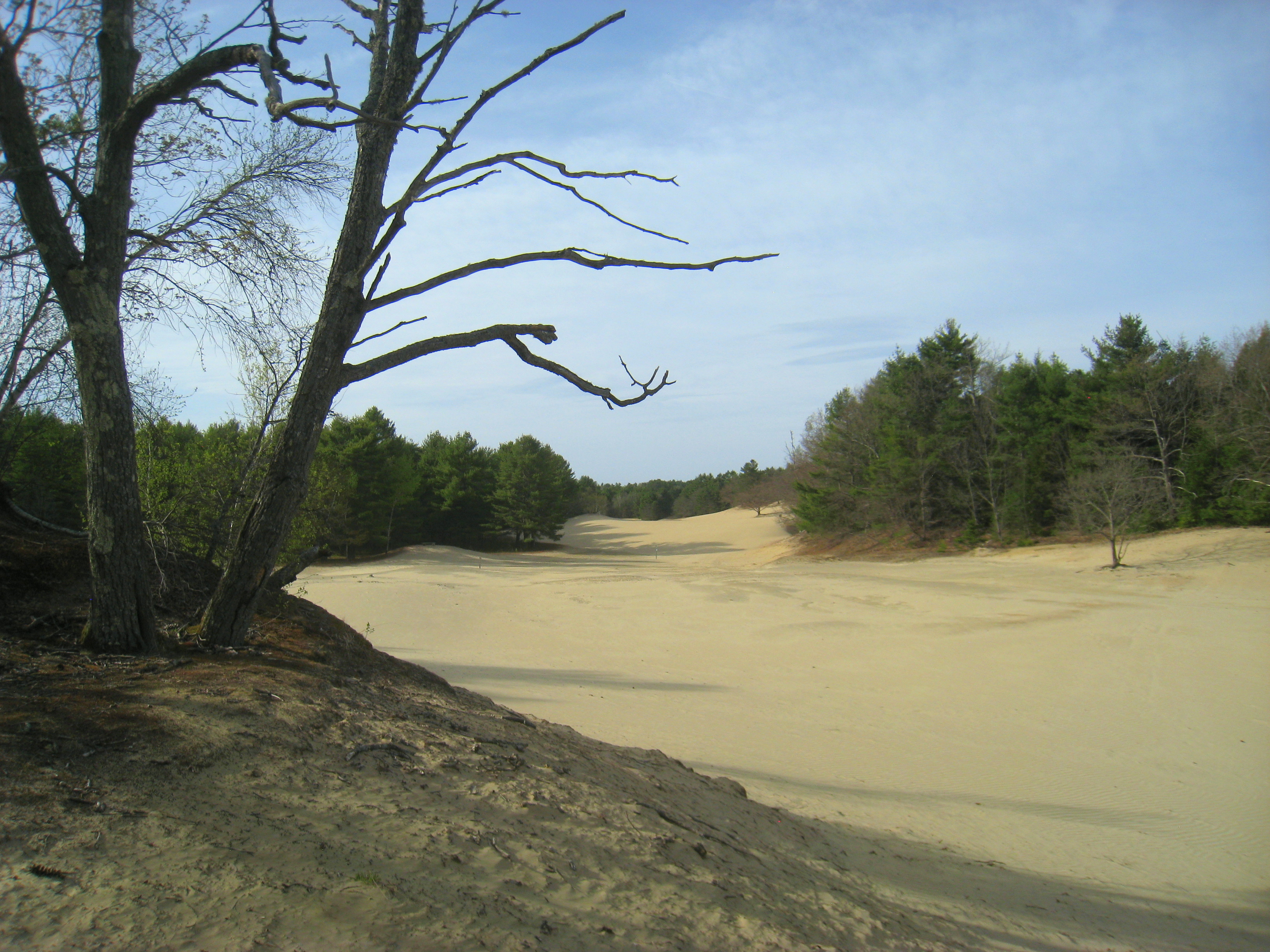

Freeport, Maine, United States
- Coordinates: 43°51′27″N 70°09′22″W
- Opening date: 1925

The Desert of Maine is a natural curiosity and privately owned tourist attraction whose main feature is a 20-acre (8.1 ha) expanse of barren glacial sand in the town of Freeport, Maine, United States. The area was de‑vegetated by poor farming practices in the 19th century. Despite the name, it is not an actual desert due to the location's high annual precipitation.

== History ==
The land that encompasses the Desert of Maine became a farm in 1821 when it was purchased by the Tuttle family. Like other Maine farmers of the era who were struggling to compete in an expanding agricultural market, the Tuttles' methods of farming gradually depleted the soil of essential nutrients. Subsequent overgrazing by large numbers of sheep produced widespread erosion of the topsoil, exposing a deposit of aeolian sand that was lying underneath. Eventually the entire farm became barren, and the Tuttles abandoned the land in 1890. For years, it was known as "the sand farm" and was a popular local feature. In 1925, Henry Goldrup purchased the land for US$300 (equivalent to about $5,500 in 2025) and developed it into a tourist attraction; he named it the "Desert of Maine".

== Geology ==
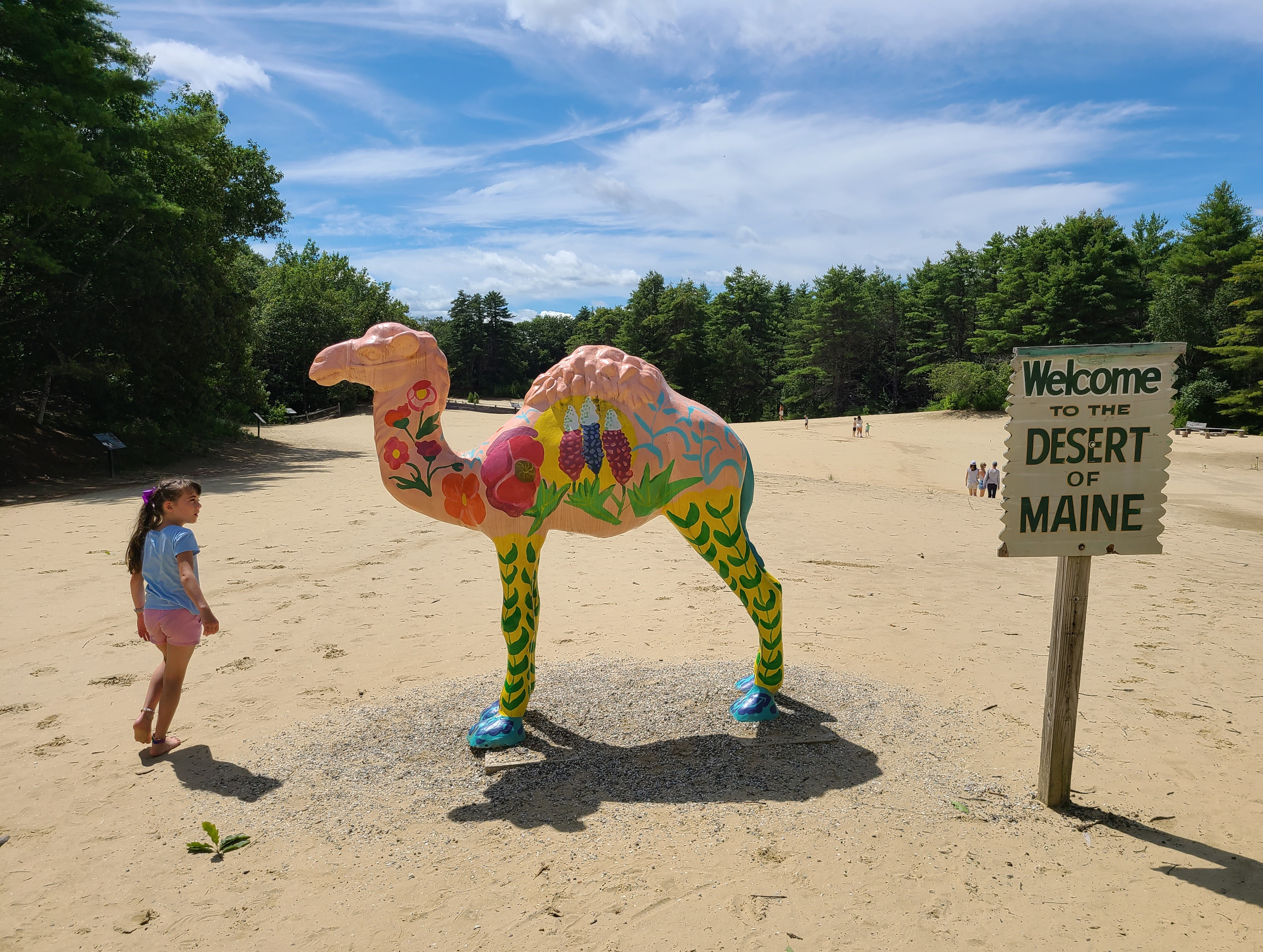
Desert of Maine's camel statue

Toward the end of the last ice age, New England was completely covered by the Laurentide Ice Sheet, which was up to 3,000 meters (almost 2 miles) thick in the region at its maximum extent. The immense weight of the ice sheet at its maximum pushed the land of coastal Maine down below sea level, as much as 175–245 meters below current elevations.

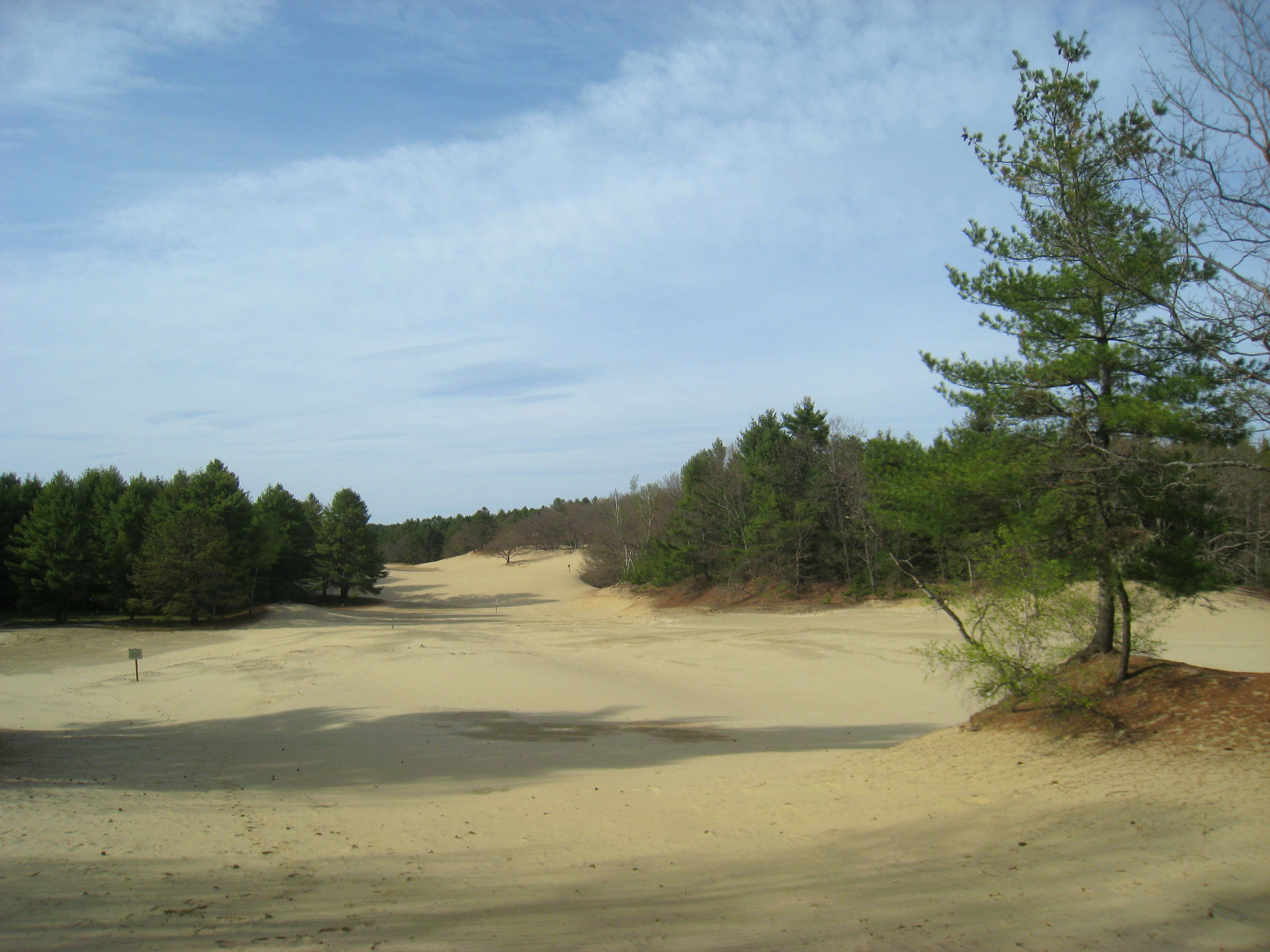
The Desert of Maine in 2010

As the glaciers in Maine started to melt, approximately 15,000 years ago, the land began to rebound. By about 13,500 years ago, the glaciers' retreat reached the Freeport area, where the land that would comprise the future Desert of Maine began to emerge from below the sea.

At some point after the Desert area emerged, it became a sink for wind-blown sand, probably around 12,500 years ago. Pioneer plants would have begun to stabilize the open sand deposits fairly quickly, perhaps within just a few hundred years. From those initial plants grew a forest, stabilizing the sand deposit until the Tuttles' farming practices uncovered it and allowed the wind to once again move the sand.

The Desert of Maine is not technically classified as a desert, as it receives an abundance of precipitation annually. The average annual snowfall is 72.1 inches, and the average annual precipitation is 50 inches, both far above the United States' averages, which are 28 inches and 38 inches respectively. To be considered a desert, the area must not receive more than 10 inches of precipitation a year.

== Tourism ==
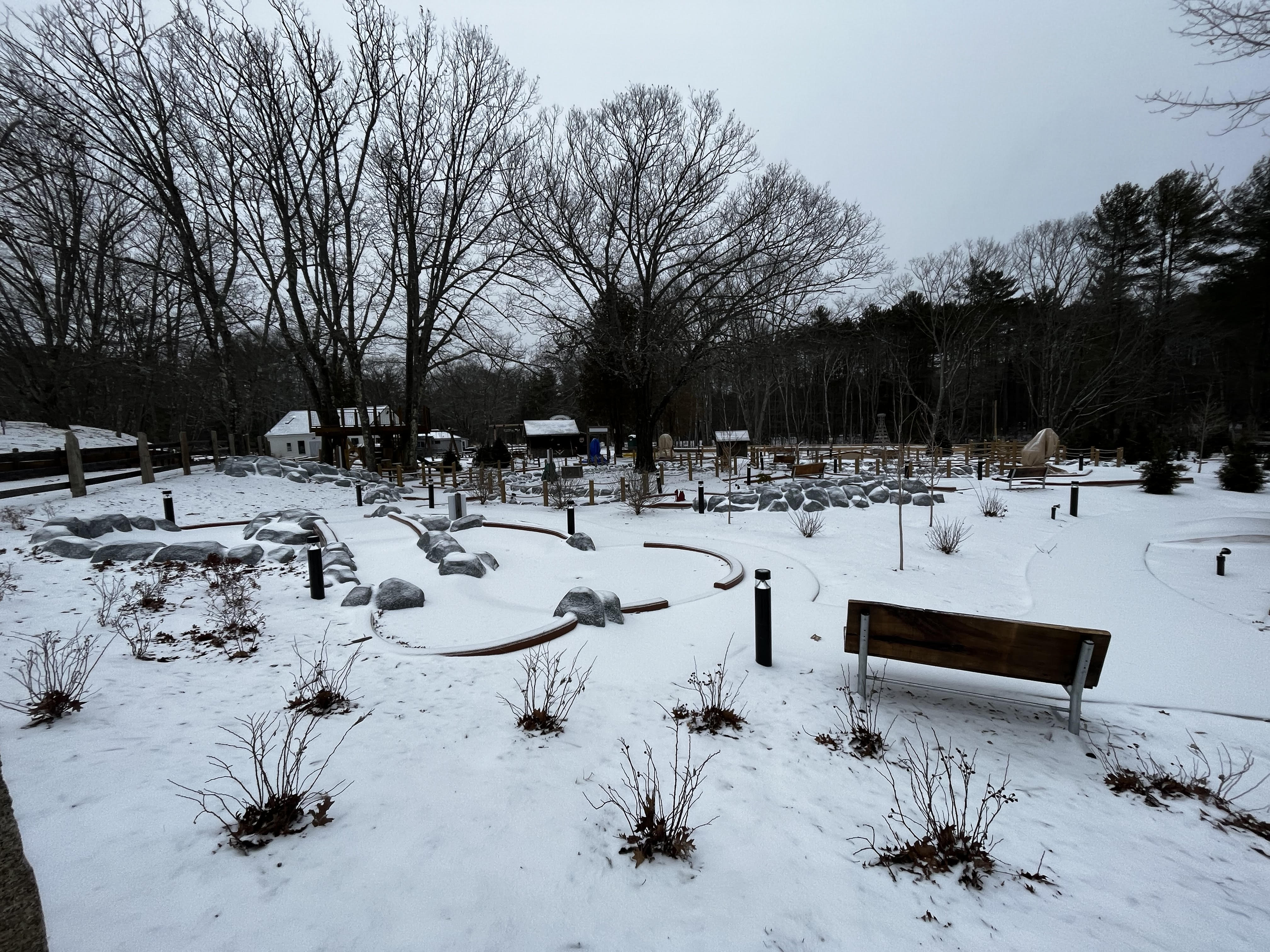
Minigolf course in January 2023

The Desert of Maine has been privately owned and maintained as a tourist attraction since 1925, with the most recent change in ownership in 2018 followed by a redevelopment campaign launched in 2020. This included excavating a house, built in 1938, that had become buried in sand during the park's closure in World War II. The town of Freeport has supported the development of the site, authorizing a special zoning district to enable the construction of new facilities and to keep the site intact and maintained. As of 2022, the site hosts a campground, rental cabins, a performing arts venue, and a miniature golf course. It also includes attractions that draw on the desert and its history, such as interpretive trails across the sand, historical buildings, and an original Ford Model T to commemorate the year of the site's opening as a tourist destination.

== See also ==
- Słowiński National Park
- Błędów Desert
- Carcross Desert
