= Wolfe's Neck Farm =

Sustainable farm in Maine, U.S.

- Location within Maine
- Town/City: Freeport
- State: Maine
- Country: United States
- Coordinates: 43.830781°N 70.071258°W
- Established: 1959; 67 years ago
- Owner: Wolfe's Neck Farm Foundation (since 1997)
- Area: 626 acres (2,530,000 m^{2})
- Status: Open to the public

Wolfe's Neck Center for Agriculture & the Environment (formerly Wolfe's Neck Farm) is a sustainable coastal farm in Freeport, Maine, United States. Located at 184 Burnett Road, the farm was established in 1959 by Philadelphia natives Eleanor Houston Smith (1910–1987) and Lawrence Smith (1902–1975).

The farm was given to the University of Southern Maine by Eleanor Smith in 1985. Twelve years later, Wolfe's Neck Farm Foundation took over the management of the property.

In addition to the farm, the property, which is situated on four miles (6.4 km) of Casco Bay coastline, also contains the main office building (located in the 1820s-built Little River House; renovated in 2017), a barn, a campground (Wolfe's Neck Oceanfront Camping at Recompence Shore Campground), a farm store and cafe, community gardens, hiking trails, the 1890-constructed Mallet Barn (at the end of Wolfe's Neck Road), the Banter House (restored in 2014; at the junction of Burnett and Wolfe's Neck Roads) and the Pote House and Barn (restored in 2017; on Wolfe's Neck Road). The Wishcamper Livestock Education Barn was built in 2017 where a barn, torn down in 2008, previously stood. An organic dairy barn, built at a cost of $1 million, opened in May 2019.

Wolfe's Neck Farm was renamed Wolfe's Neck Center for Agriculture & the Environment in October 2017.

In 2019, Wolfe's Neck Center received a donation of $25,000 from Kennebec Savings Bank "to support enhancements to its facilities."

In 2025, the USDA canceled a $35 million agriculture grant which the farm was in line to receive as part of the Partnerships for Climate-Smart Commodities program. The program was initiated during the Joe Biden presidential administration, but the farm's overhead costs exceeded the guidelines set by Biden's successor, Donald Trump.

== Gallery ==
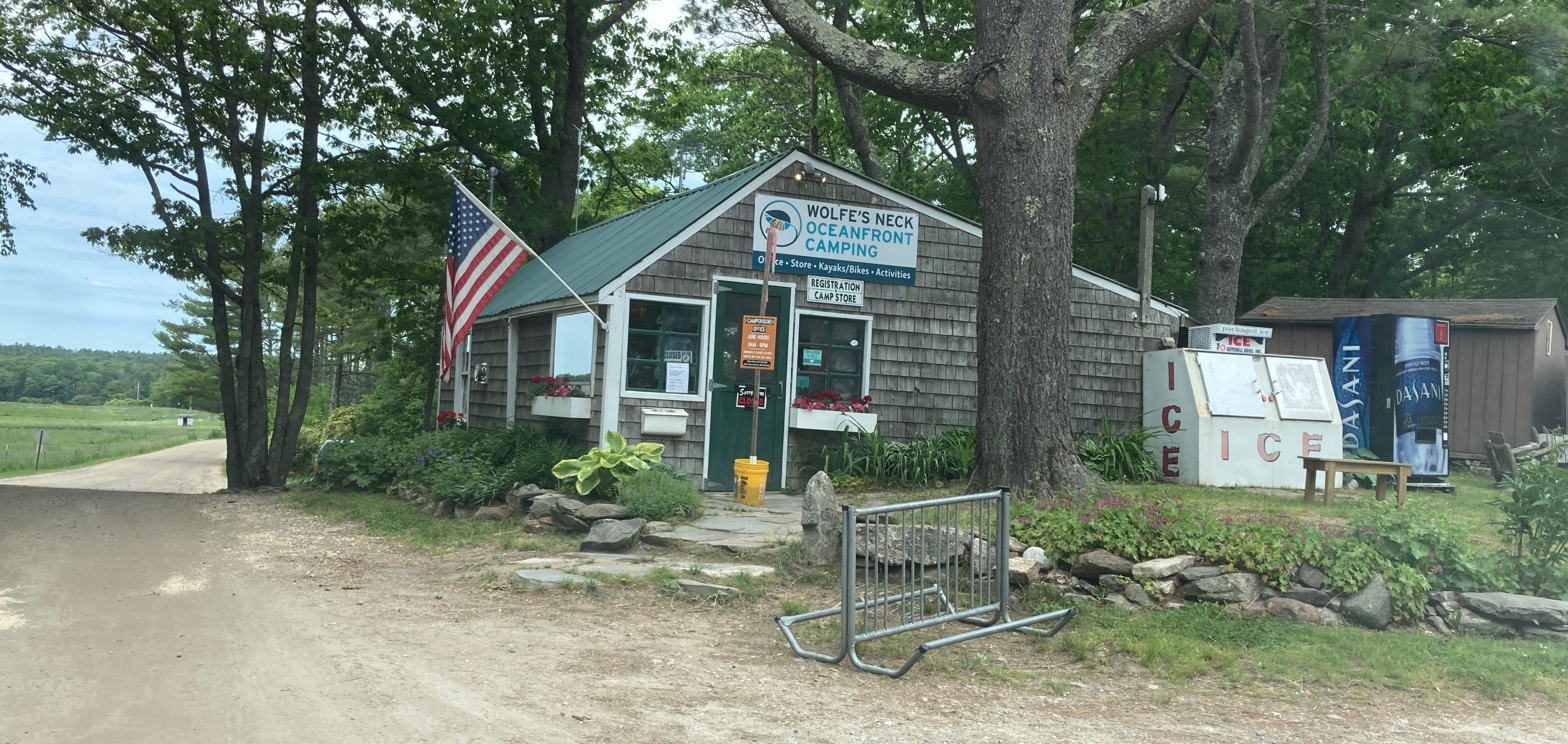
The camp store on Burnett Road
