= Wolfe's Neck Woods State Park =

State park in Cumberland County, Maine

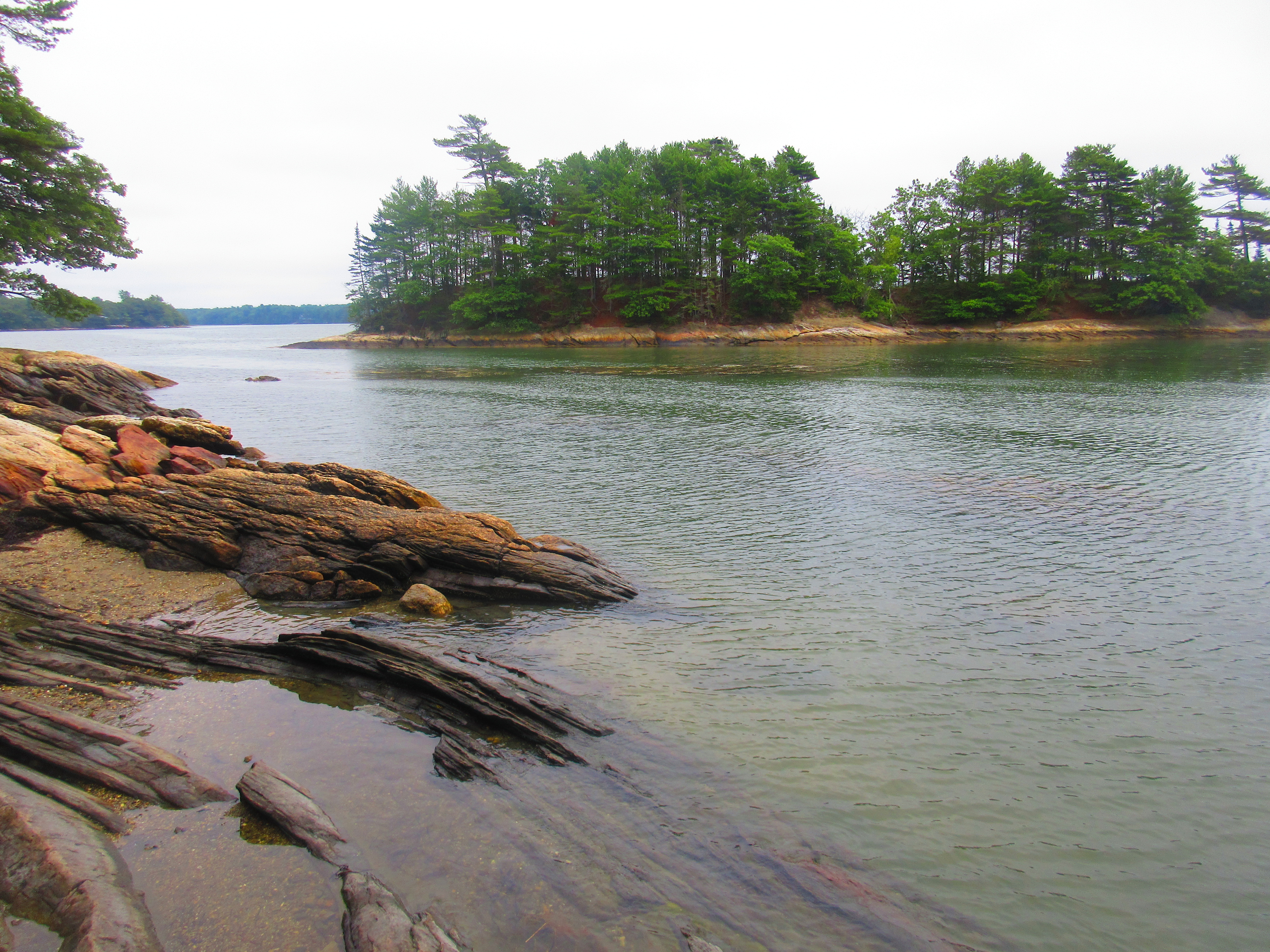
- Looking northeast to Googins Island from the park

- Location within Maine
- Interactive map of Wolfe's Neck Woods State Park
- Location: Freeport, Maine, United States
- Coordinates: 43°49′33″N 70°05′08″W
- Area: 244 acres (99 ha)
- Elevation: 98 ft (30 m)
- Established: 1969
- Administrator: Maine Department of Agriculture, Conservation and Forestry
- Website: Official website
- Maine State Parks

Wolfe's Neck Woods State Park is a public recreation area located on Casco Bay on the southeastern side of Freeport, Maine. The state park occupies 244 acres (99 ha) on a narrow peninsula, Wolfe's Neck, that runs between Casco Bay and the Harraseeket River. It includes white pine and hemlock forests, salt marsh estuary, and rocky shore. The park is managed by the Maine Department of Agriculture, Conservation and Forestry.

== History ==
Wolfe's Neck takes its name from Henry and Rachel Woolfe, the area's first permanent European settlers who took up residence in 1733. During the 20th century, the land was the site of an organic beef-raising operation owned by Lawrence M.C. Smith and Eleanor Houston Smith. The state park was created when the Smiths donated a portion of their holdings to the state in 1969. The park opened to the public in 1972.

== Activities and amenities ==
The park offers hiking, birdwatching, picnicking, cross-country skiing, and snowshoeing. Park trails traverse both forested lands and rocky shoreline, offering views of the river and bay. Osprey can be observed nesting on Googins Island, which lies just off shore.
