= Freeport, Maine =

Town in Maine, United States

- Town
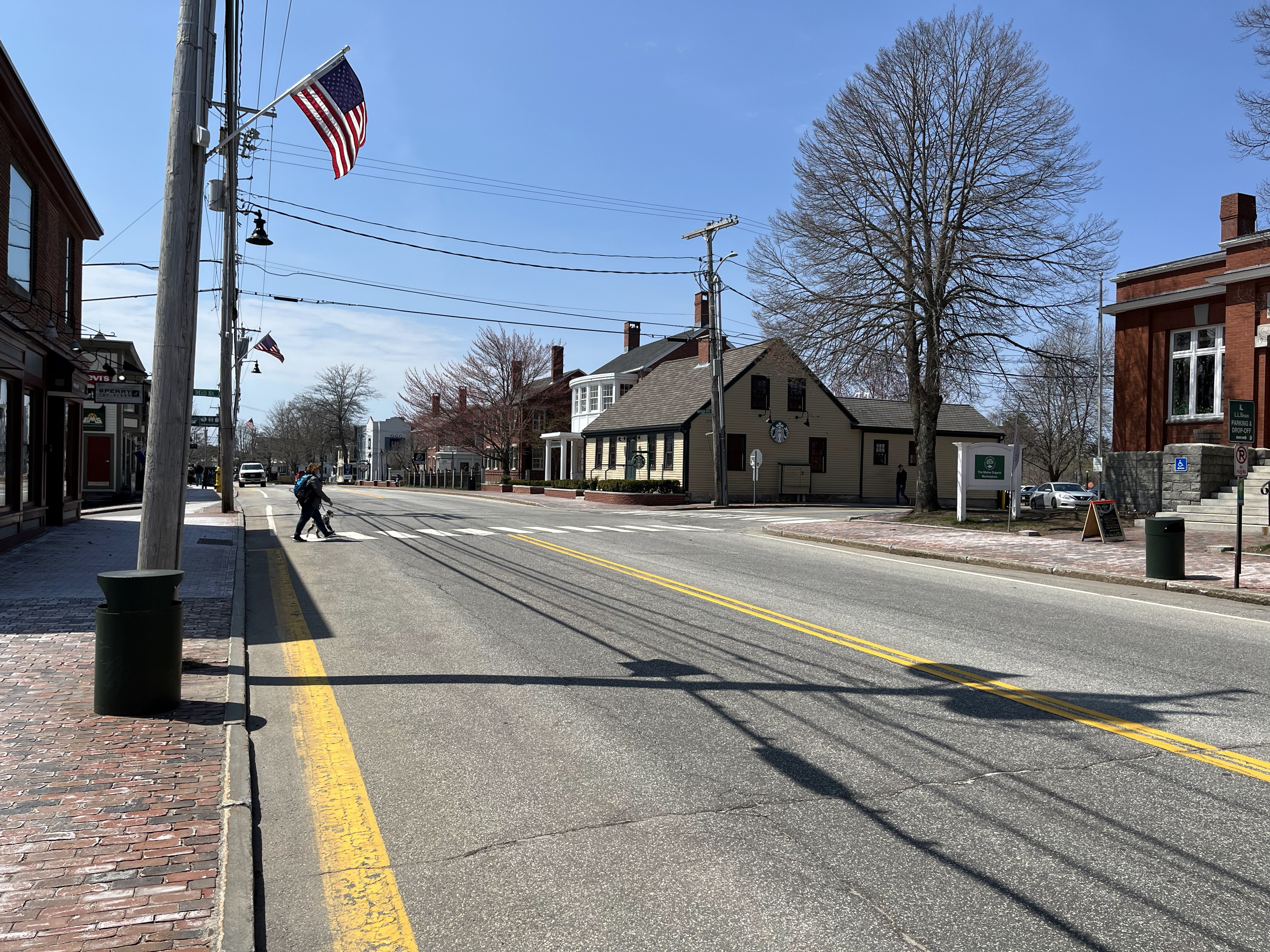
- Freeport's Main Street (U.S. Route 1), looking south

- Seal

- Location in Cumberland County and the state of Maine
- Coordinates: 43°52′08″N 70°07′22″W
- Country: United States
- State: Maine
- County: Cumberland
- Incorporated: February 14, 1789
- Communities: Freeport; Bustins Island; Cushing Briggs; Mast Landing; Pleasant Hill; Porter Landing; South Freeport; Wardtown

Area
  - Total: 46.47 sq mi (120.36 km^{2})
  - Land: 34.70 sq mi (89.87 km^{2})
  - Water: 11.77 sq mi (30.48 km^{2})
- Elevation: 39 ft (12 m)

Population (2020)
  - Total: 8,737
  - Density: 252/sq mi (97.2/km^{2})
- Time zone: UTC−5 (Eastern (EST))
  - Summer (DST): UTC−4 (EDT)
- ZIP Codes: 04032–04034
- Area code: 207
- FIPS code: 23-26525
- GNIS feature ID: 582481
- Website: www.freeportmaine.com

Freeport is a town in Cumberland County, Maine, United States. Freeport is included in the Lewiston-Auburn, Maine metropolitan New England City and Town Area. The population was 8,737 at the 2020 census. Once home to a prominent shipbuilding industry, timber operations, and farming, it is now known for its numerous outlet stores; Freeport is home to L.L. Bean, Wolfe's Neck Woods State Park, and the Desert of Maine.

Freeport is part of the Portland-South Portland-Biddeford metropolitan area. The Harraseeket Historic District is in Freeport.

== History ==
The town was once a part of North Yarmouth called Harraseeket, after the Harraseeket River. First settled about 1700, it was set off and incorporated on February 14, 1789, as Freeport. It is probably named "from the openness of its harbor" (free from ice). Freeport developed as four villages—Mast Landing, Porter's Landing, South Freeport and Freeport Corner—all of which are now part of the Harraseeket Historic District, listed on the National Register of Historic Places.

At the head of tide on the Harraseeket River is Mast Landing, from which timber was shipped, particularly for use as masts. The estuary was dammed to provide water power for a gristmill, sawmill and fulling mill, with modest manufacturing and woodworking. Porter's Landing was involved in shipbuilding, important in Freeport following the Revolutionary War. The industry reached its peak in the decade between 1850 and 1860, but declined with the Civil War. South Freeport, the largest of the waterfront villages, once had four shipyards. Other businesses included fishing, canning and farming. In 1903, the Casco Castle was built here by Amos Gerald to encourage travel by trolley cars. The hotel burned in 1914, but its tower still stands.

Freeport Corner was an inland village for farming and trade, but the 1849 entrance of the railroad helped it develop into the town's commercial center, which it remains. In the 19th century, fabric was sent from New York and Boston to be made into clothing by local piece workers. Businessman E. B. Mallet established here a sawmill, brickyard, granite quarry and large shoe factory.

In 1912, Leon Leonwood Bean opened a store in the basement of his brother's apparel shop at Freeport Corner, selling the "Bean Boot" (or Maine Hunting Shoe). This store, L. L. Bean, became so popular that in 1951 it started remaining open 24 hours a day. Its retail and mail order catalog facilities expanded into Freeport's principal business, and a worldwide company with annual sales of over a billion dollars. The L.L. Bean flagship store is the anchor to outlet shopping in the town of Freeport. The town sees about 3.5 million visitors annually, spending $308 million in 2015 alone. L.L. Bean, for its part, has invested heavily in activities for both visitors and residents, including their Outdoor Discovery Schools, and their Summer Concert Series, which has attracted artists such as Edwin McCain, Great Big Sea, Buckwheat Zydeco, and Rockapella.

In 1982, McDonald's made plans to tear down the Gore House, an 1850s Greek Revival house to build one of its stores. Outcry from residents caused the town to adopt new ordinances concerning what businesses could and could not do with their buildings, and McDonald's built the restaurant inside the house and opened it in 1984, maintaining the exterior appearance. This was one of the first times that McDonald's had been forced to change its restaurant design to fit local requirements.

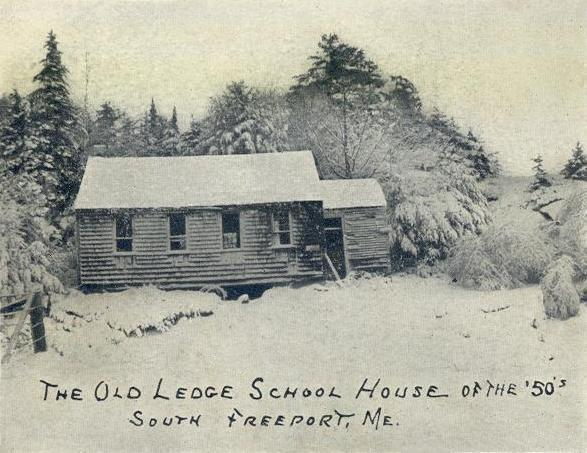
Old Ledge Schoolhouse c. 1905

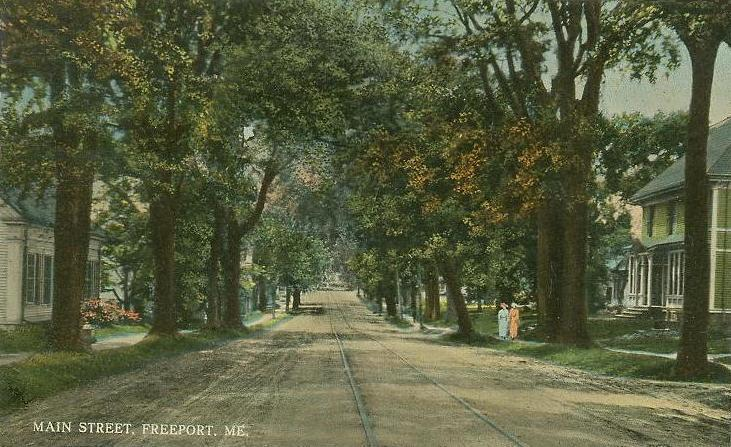
Main Street c. 1910

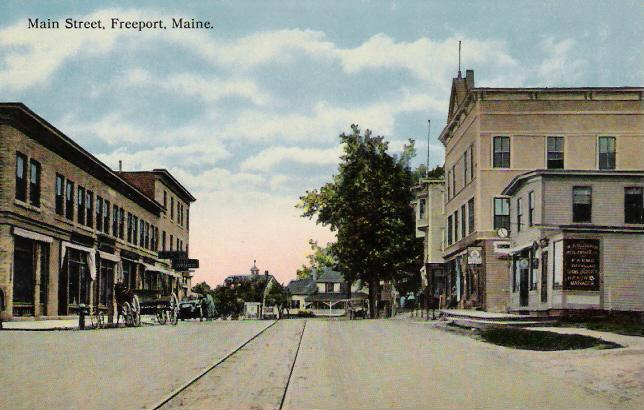
Main Street c. 1912

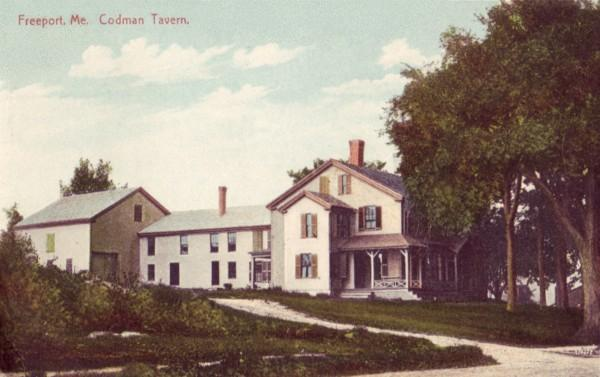
Jameson Tavern c. 1915

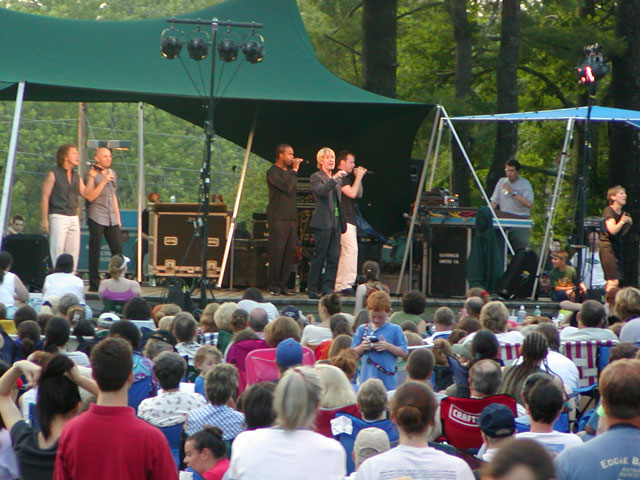
Rockapella performs at the L.L. Bean Summer Concert Series, July 2003

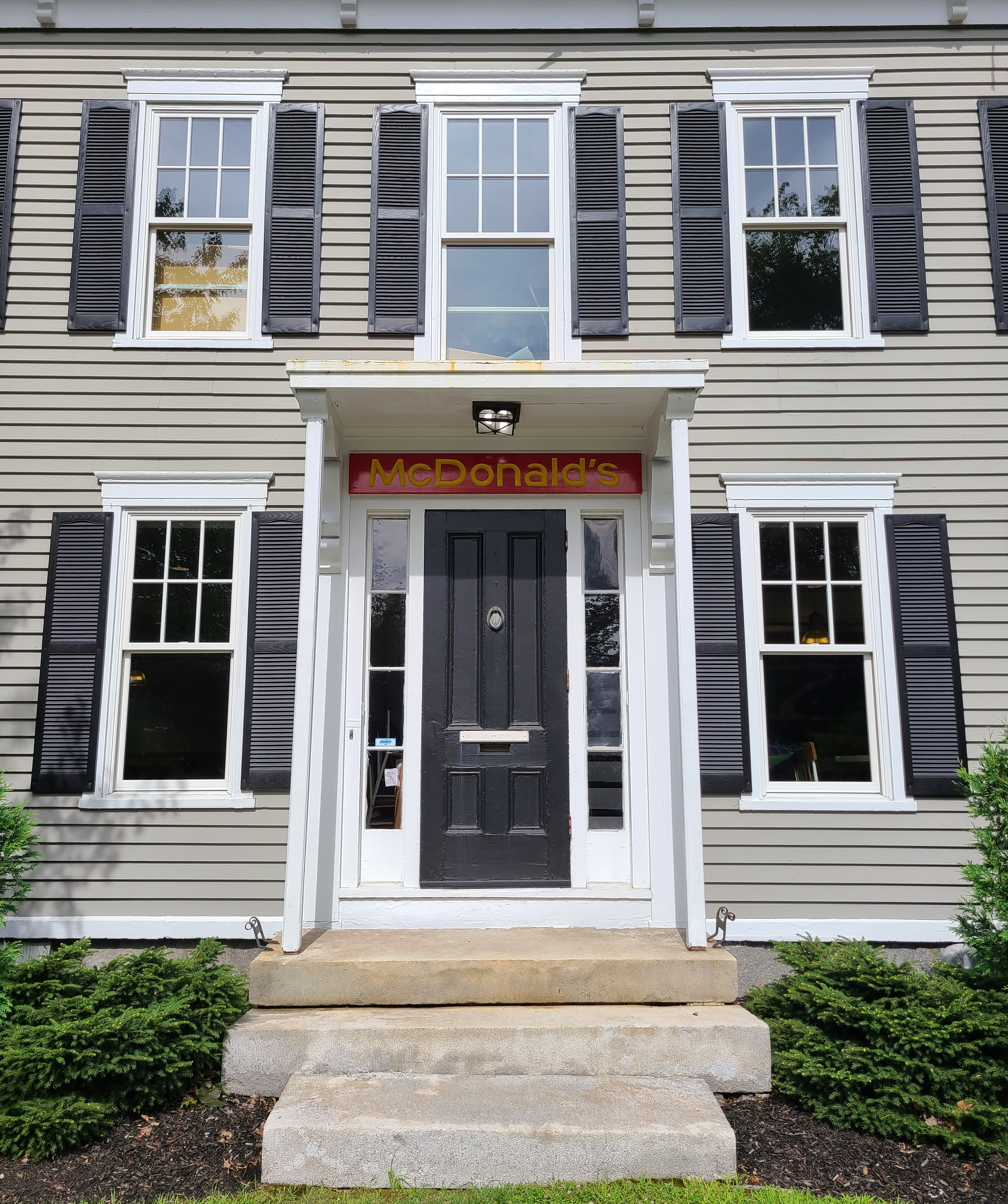
Facade of McDonald's located in Freeport where the restaurant was forced to maintain the pre-existing exterior of the house.

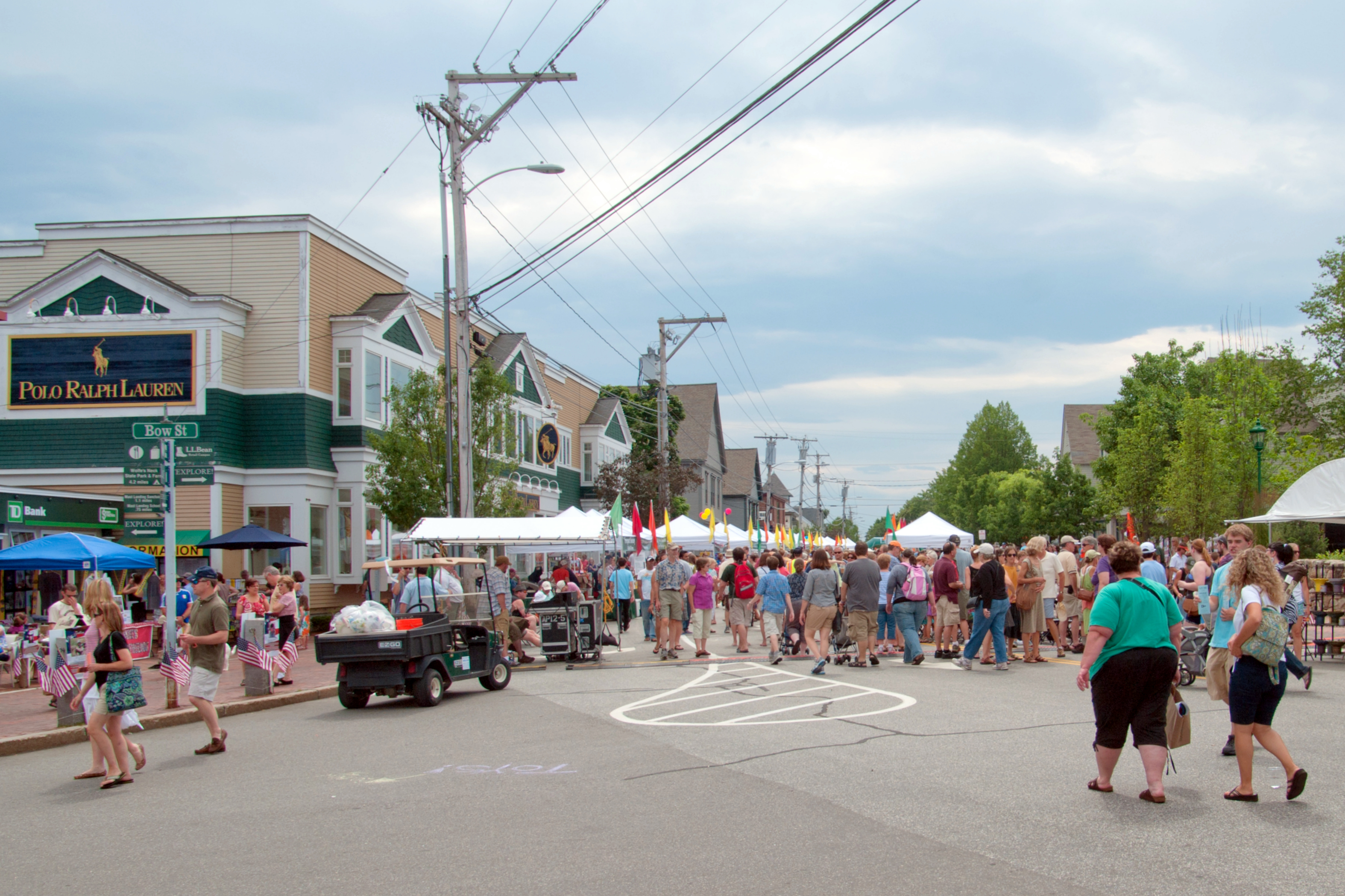
Main Street, 2012

== Geography ==
According to the United States Census Bureau, the town has a total area of 46.47 square miles (120.36 km^{2}), of which 34.70 square miles (89.87 km^{2}) is land and 11.77 square miles (30.48 km^{2}) is water. Situated at the northeastern extremity of Casco Bay, Freeport is drained by the Harraseeket River.

Freeport borders Brunswick and Durham to the north, Pownal to the west, and Yarmouth to the southwest. Freeport also shares small borders with Cumberland and Harpswell in Casco Bay. Cumberland and Harpswell are not connected to Freeport by roads, but since Freeport's town border ranges out into Casco Bay, the other towns' borders meet Freeport's.

=== Climate ===
This climatic region is typified by large seasonal temperature differences, with warm, often humid summers and cold (sometimes severely cold) winters. According to the Köppen climate classification system, Freeport has a warm-summer humid continental climate, abbreviated "Dfb" on climate maps.

== Transportation ==
Both U.S. 1 and Interstate-295 run directly through Freeport, the latter with three exits northbound (20, 22 and 24) and two exits southbound (22 and 20).

Amtrak's Downeaster train service stops at Freeport station with service to the Portland Transportation Center and Boston's North Station.

Greater Portland Metro's BREEZ provides bus service between Brunswick and Portland, with four stops in Freeport.

== Demographics ==
Historical population
Census	Pop.	Note	%±
1790	1,320		—
1800	2,237		69.5%
1810	2,184		−2.4%
1820	2,184		0.0%
1830	2,623		20.1%
1840	2,662		1.5%
1850	2,629		−1.2%
1860	2,792		6.2%
1870	2,457		−12.0%
1880	2,279		−7.2%
1890	2,482		8.9%
1900	2,339		−5.8%
1910	2,460		5.2%
1920	2,488		1.1%
1930	2,184		−12.2%
1940	2,764		26.6%
1950	3,280		18.7%
1960	4,055		23.6%
1970	4,781		17.9%
1980	5,863		22.6%
1990	6,905		17.8%
2000	7,800		13.0%
2010	7,879		1.0%
2020	8,737		10.9%
U.S. Decennial Census

=== 2010 census ===
As of the census of 2010, there were 7,879 people, 3,209 households, and 2,173 families residing in the town. The population density was 227.1 inhabitants per square mile (87.7/km^{2}). There were 3,690 housing units at an average density of 106.3 per square mile (41.0/km^{2}). The racial makeup of the town was 95.2% White, 0.6% African American, 0.4% Native American, 2.3% Asian, 0.2% from other races, and 1.4% from two or more races. Hispanic or Latino of any race were 1.1% of the population.

There were 3,209 households, of which 32.6% had children under the age of 18 living with them, 55.8% were married couples living together, 8.2% had a female householder with no husband present, 3.7% had a male householder with no wife present, and 32.3% were non-families. Of all households, 25.1% were made up of individuals, and 10% had someone living alone who was 65 years of age or older. The average household size was 2.40 and the average family size was 2.89.

The median age in the town was 45 years. 22.8% of residents were under the age of 18; 5.3% were between the ages of 18 and 24; 22% were from 25 to 44; 34.7% were from 45 to 64; and 15.3% were 65 years of age or older. The gender makeup of the town was 47.4% male and 52.6% female.

=== 2000 census ===
As of the census of 2000, there were 7,800 people, 3,065 households, and 2,151 families residing in the town. The population density was 224.8 inhabitants per square mile (86.8/km^{2}). There were 3,276 housing units at an average density of 94.4 per square mile (36.4/km^{2}). The racial makeup of the town was 97.22% White, 0.42% Black or African American, 0.31% Native American, 1.04% Asian, 0.04% Pacific Islander, 0.33% from other races, and 0.64% from two or more races. Hispanic or Latino of any race were 0.74% of the population.

There were 3,065 households, out of which 34.7% had children under the age of 18 living with them, 57.5% were married couples living together, 9.5% had a female householder with no husband present, and 29.8% were non-families. Of all households, 22.4% were made up of individuals, and 7.4% had someone living alone who was 65 years of age or older. The average household size was 2.49 and the average family size was 2.93.

In the town, the population was spread out, with 25.2% under the age of 18, 5.0% from 18 to 24, 29.4% from 25 to 44, 27.6% from 45 to 64, and 12.7% who were 65 years of age or older. The median age was 40 years. For every 100 females, there were 94.5 males. For every 100 females age 18 and over, there were 89.9 males.

The median income for a household in the town was $52,023, and the median income for a family was $58,134. Males had a median income of $41,703 versus $27,490 for females. The per capita income for the town was $27,724. About 4.0% of families and 5.9% of the population were below the poverty line, including 7.0% of those under age 18 and 10.4% of those age 65 or over.

== Education ==
Freeport is part of Regional school unit #5.

Public schools

- Morse Street School, grades K–2
- Mast Landing School, grades 3–5
- Freeport Middle School, grades 6–8
- Freeport High School, grades 9–12

Private schools

- École Française du Maine, grades K–7 (French immersion)
- Maine Coast Waldorf School
- Pine Tree Academy (Seventh-day Adventist Church)

== Sites of interest ==
- Desert of Maine
- Mann Cemetery
- Wolfe's Neck Woods State Park
- Wolfe’s Neck Center for Agriculture & the Environment
- Freeport Village Station

== Notable people ==
- Cyrus Augustus Bartol, pastor and writer
- Melissa Coleman, author, columnist, and writer
- Aaron Lufkin Dennison, watchmaker
- Beth Edmonds, president of the state senate
- Francis Ellis, stand-up comedian, actor, and podcaster
- Sara Gideon, Speaker of the Maine House of Representatives
- John Gould, humorist, columnist
- Donald B. MacMillan, admiral, Arctic explorer
- Christopher McCormick, businessman
- Edward C. Plummer, historian
- Joan Benoit Samuelson, Olympic marathon gold medalist (1984)
- Stephen Gill Spottswood - Bishop and Chairman of the NAACP
- Rufus Soule, shipbuilder and state politician
