= G. W. & W. D. Hewitt =

American architectural firm

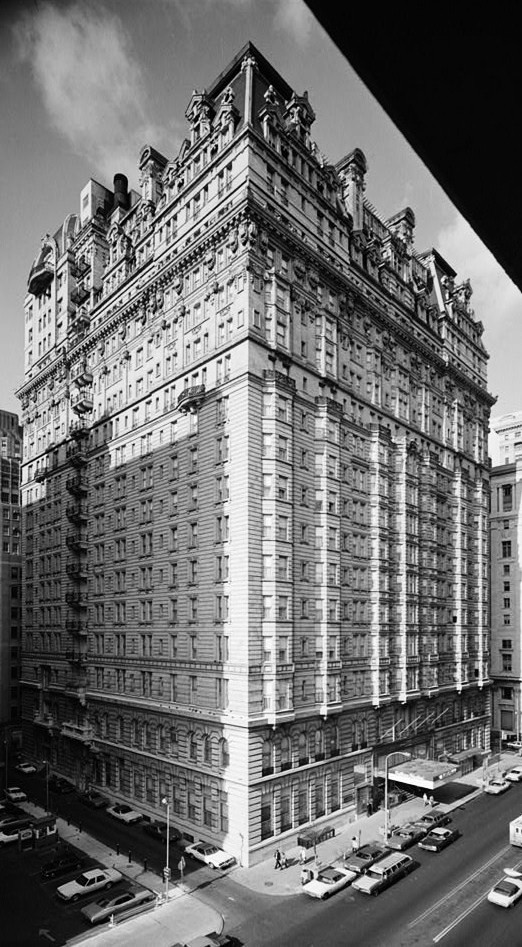
The Bellevue-Stratford Hotel at 220 South Broad Street in Philadelphia (1902-04), photographed in 1976

G. W. & W. D. Hewitt was a prominent architectural firm in the eastern United States at the end of the 19th and beginning of the 20th centuries. It was founded in Philadelphia in 1878, by brothers George Wattson Hewitt (1841–1916) and William Dempster Hewitt (1847–1924), both members of the American Institute of Architects. The firm specialized in churches, hotels and palatial residences, especially crenelated mansions, such as Maybrook (1881), Druim Moir (1885–86) and Boldt Castle (1900–04).

The last, which was built for George Boldt, owner of The Bellevue-Stratford Hotel at 220 South Broad Street in Center City Philadelphia (1902–04), is G.W. & W.D. Hewitt's best known building.

== History ==
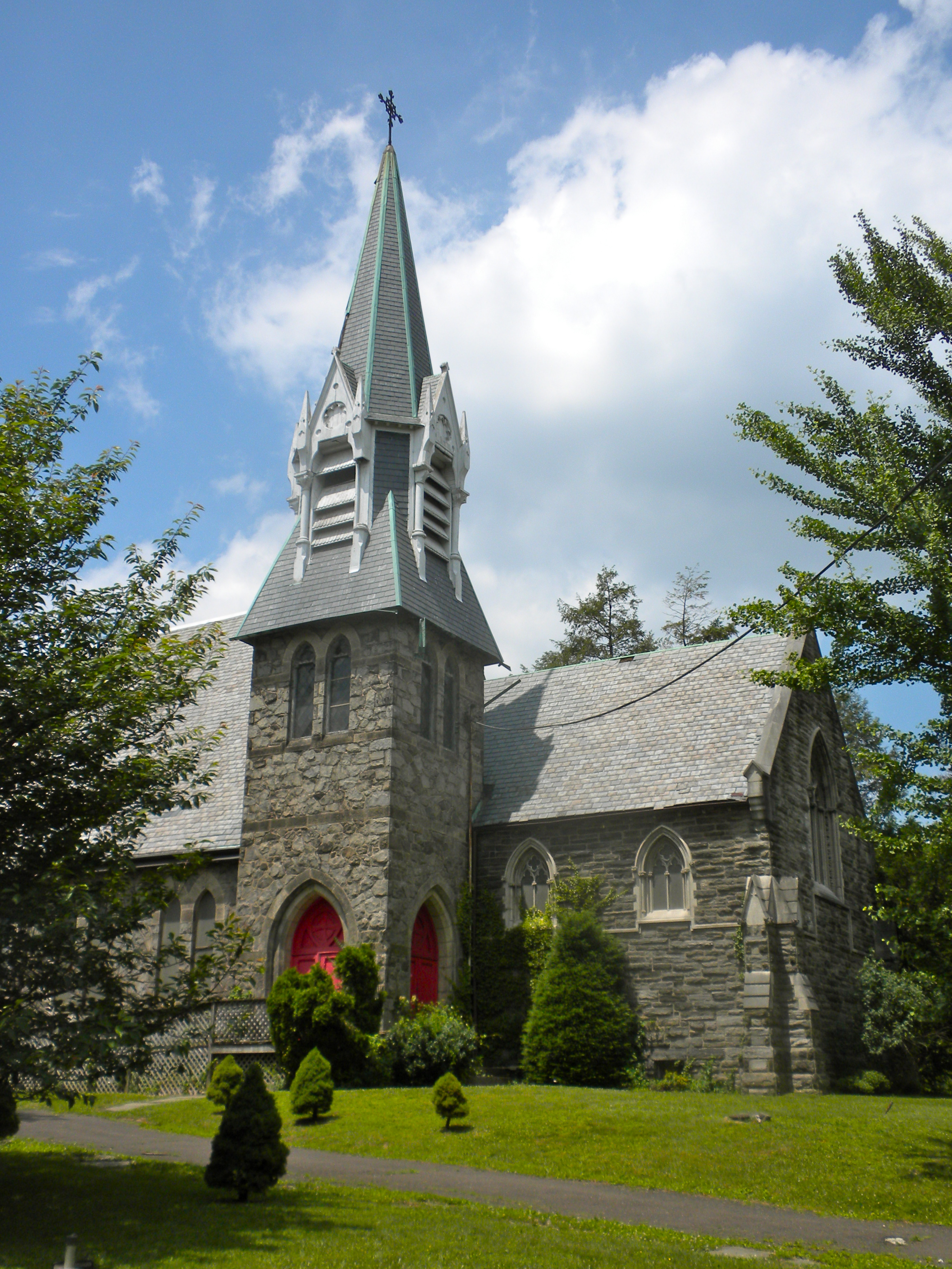
St. Peter's Episcopal Church of Germantown in the Germantown section of Philadelphia, 1873

Hewitt worked in the office of John Notman, and became an expert on English ecclesiastical architecture. In 1867, he formed a partnership with John Fraser and Frank Furness, which lasted until 1871. The younger men formed their own firm, Furness & Hewitt, whose most notable building was the Pennsylvania Academy of the Fine Arts (1871–76). Louis Sullivan worked briefly as a draftsman for Furness & Hewitt (June – November 1873), and left descriptions of the Hewitt brothers (speaking of himself in third person as "Louis"):

George Hewitt [was] a slender, moustached person, pale and reserved, who seldom relaxed from pose. It was he who did the Victorian Gothic in its pantalettes, when a church building or something of the sort was on the board. With precision, as though he held his elements by pincers, he worked out the decorous sublimities of inanity, as per the English current magazines and other English sources. He was a clean draftsman, and believed implicitly that all that was good was English. Louis regarded him with admiration as a draftsman, and with mild contempt as a man who kept his nose in books.

But Hewitt had a younger brother named John [sic], and John was foreman of the shop. He was a husky, smooth-faced fellow under thirty. Every feature in his clean cut, rather elongated face, bespoke intelligence and kindness, in fact a big heart. He had taken a fancy to Louis from the start. He was the 'practical man' and Louis ran to him for advice whenever he found himself in a tight place. John was patience itself and made everything clear with dainty sketches and explanatory notes. These drawings were beautiful and Louis frankly told him so. He begged John to teach him 'touch' and how to make such sketches, and especially how to 'indicate' so crisply. This John did. In fact, it was not long before he made of Louis a draftsman of the Upper crust, and Louis's heart went out to lovable John in sheer gratitude.

Writing a half century after the fact, Sullivan misremembered William Hewitt's name (there was no John Hewitt). Furness & Hewitt continued until 1875, and George opened his own firm, making his brother William a partner in 1878.

In the early 1880s, Henry H. Houston, a director of the Pennsylvania Railroad, began developing 3,000 acres (12 km^{2}) in the western Chestnut Hill section of Philadelphia. The Hewitt brothers did the planning for the upper-class suburb and designed the principal buildings, including a resort hotel, the Wissahickon Inn (1883–84) (now Springside Chestnut Hill Academy); the first clubhouse for the Philadelphia Cricket Club (1883–84, burned 1909); Houston's own mansion, Druim Moir (1886); and St. Martin-in-the-Fields Episcopal Church (1888). More than 100 Chestnut Hill houses were designed by the Hewitts.

Horace Trumbauer did his apprenticeship with the firm. Phineas Paist worked for the firm, and became a partner in it. Following George's 1907 retirement, the firm continued as Hewitt, Stevens & Paist.

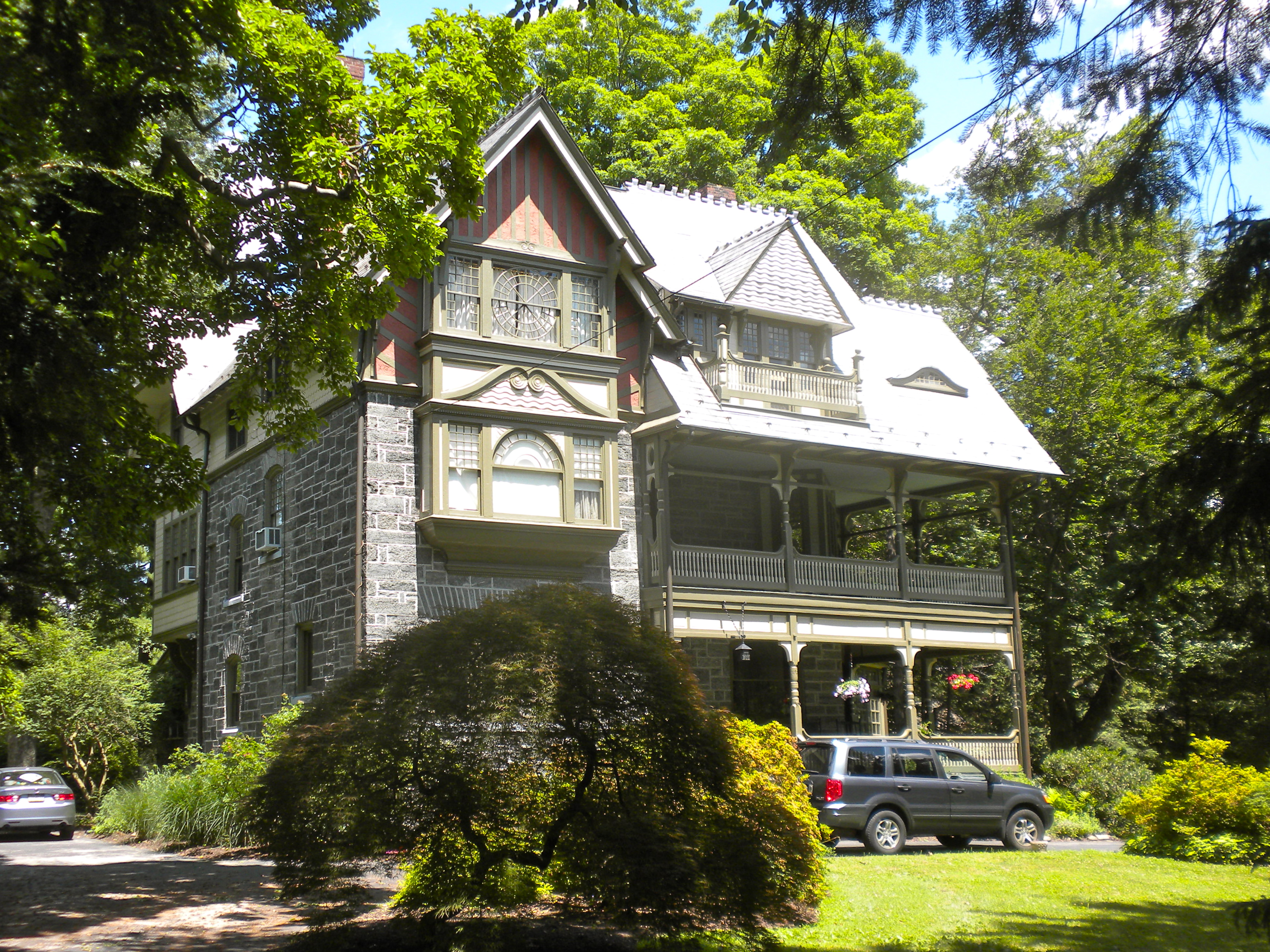
Houston-Sauveur House in Chestnut Hill in Philadelphia, PA (1885). Prior to its 1887 sale to Sauveur, this probably served as a sample house for Henry H. Houston's suburban development

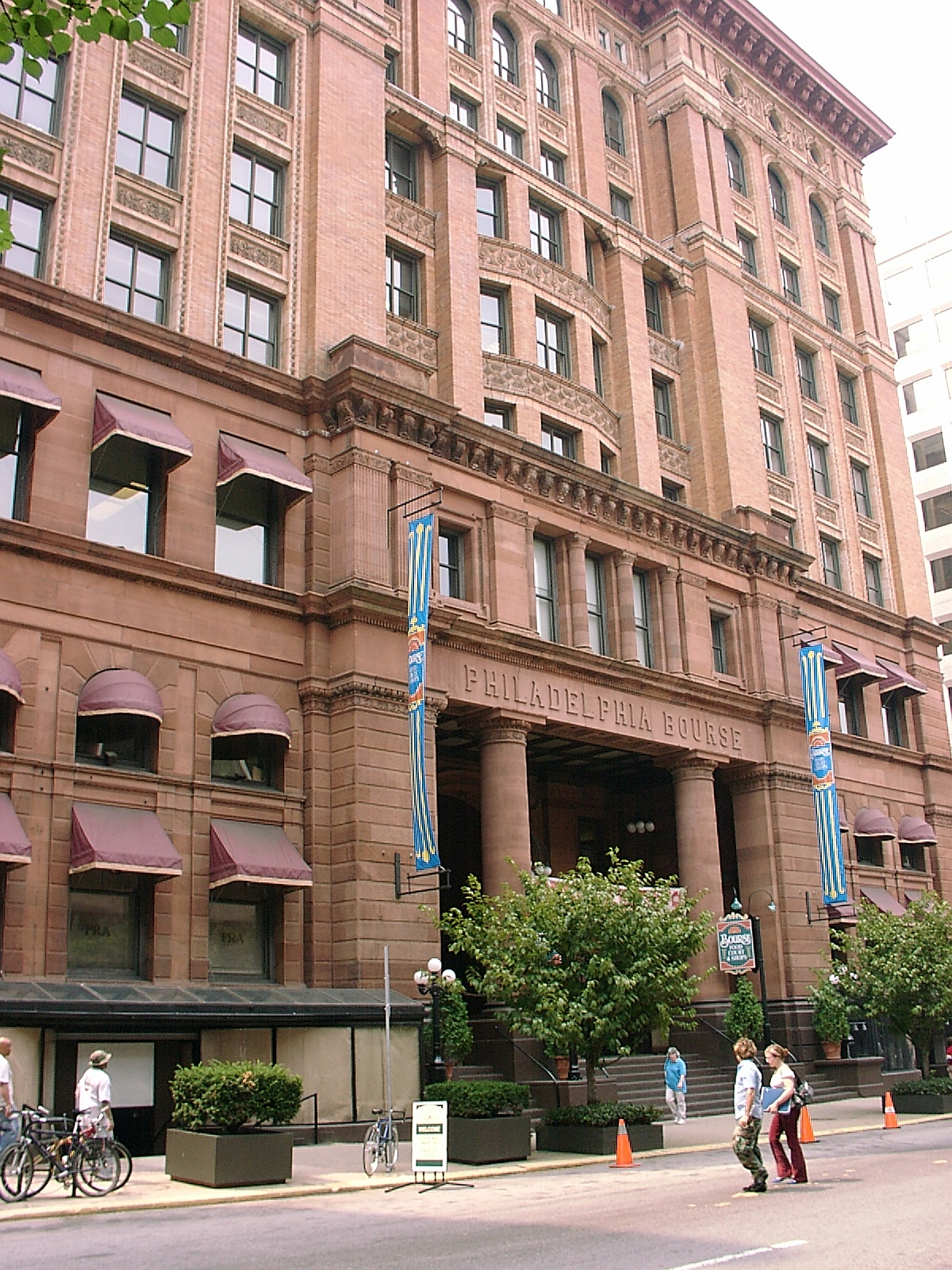
The Philadelphia Bourse Building (1893-95) housed a commodities exchange until the 1960s, and is now used for retail and offices

== Selected buildings ==
=== Churches ===
- St. Peter's Episcopal Church of Germantown, 6000 Wayne Avenue, Philadelphia (1873)
- Providence Presbyterian Church at Bustleton, 2087 Old York Rd., Burlington, New Jersey (1878)
- Church of Saint John the Evangelist, 1720 Old Black Horse Pk., Runnemede, New Jersey (1880–81)
- Church of St. Martin-in-the-Fields, 8000 St. Martin's Ln., Chestnut Hill, Philadelphia (1888)
- St. Andrew's Church, 50 York St., Lambertville, New Jersey (1891)

=== Residences ===
- "Maybrook" (Henry C. Gibson mansion), Wynnewood, Pennsylvania (1881)
- Drexel Development Historic District, West Philadelphia (1883). Speculative rowhouses built for Anthony Joseph Drexel, on the block bounded by Pine, 39th, Baltimore, and 40th Streets.
- Edwin T. Coxe mansion, 280 W. Walnut Ln., Germantown, Philadelphia (1885)
- Houston-Sauveur house (Louis C. Sauveur house), 8205 Seminole Ave., Chestnut Hill, Philadelphia (1885)
- "Druim Moir" (Henry H. Houston mansion), Willow Grove Ave. & Cherokee St., Chestnut Hill, Philadelphia, (1885–86)
- "Brinkwood" (Samuel F. Houston mansion), Chestnut Hill, Philadelphia (1885–86)
- William Thompson Harris mansion, Highland & Bryn Mawr Aves., Cynwyd, Pennsylvania (1886)
- Spruce Hill speculative row, 4206-18 Spruce St., Philadelphia (1886)
- William C. Sharpless house, 5446 Wayne Ave., Germantown, Philadelphia (1886)
- Henry Lister Townsend house, 6015 Wayne Ave., Germantown, Philadelphia (1887).
- "Briar Crest" (William Henry Maule mansion), Villanova, Pennsylvania (pre-1897)
- Boldt Castle, Heart Island, Alexandria Bay, New York (1900–04)
- Music room addition to Horace Brock house, 1920 Spruce St., Philadelphia (1902–03), (now Helen Corning Warden Theater, Academy of Vocal Arts)

=== Hotels, businesses and institutional buildings ===
- Wissahickon Inn (now Springside Chestnut Hill Academy), 500 W. Willow Grove Ave., Chestnut Hill, Philadelphia (1883–84)
- Philadelphia Cricket Club, 415 W. Willow Grove Ave., Chestnut Hill, Philadelphia (1883–84, burned 1909)
- Cornwall & Lebanon Railroad Station (C & L Depot), Lebanon, Pennsylvania (1885)
- Hahnemann Hospital, 15th & Race Sts., Philadelphia, PA (pre-1888, demolished)
- Kensington Branch, Philadelphia YWCA, Philadelphia (1891)
- Olympic Hotel, Blackwell Point, Tacoma, Washington (1891–93), (now Stadium High School)
- Receiving Ward, Episcopal Hospital, Front St. & Lehigh Ave., Philadelphia (1892–94, demolished)
- Wistar Institute, 3601 Spruce St., Philadelphia (1892–94)
- Philadelphia Bourse, 13 S. 5th St. (facing Independence Mall), Philadelphia (1893–95)
- Gibson Building, 1307-11 Market St., Philadelphia (1897, demolished)
- "The Castle" (Tau chapter of Psi Upsilon fraternity), University of Pennsylvania, 250 S. 36th St., Philadelphia (1897–99)
- Hahnemann Medical College, Broad & Race Sts., Philadelphia (pre-1899, demolished)
- Pitcairn Building, 1027-31 Arch St., Philadelphia (1901)
- The Bellevue-Stratford Hotel, Broad & Walnut Sts., Philadelphia (1902–04)

== Gallery ==
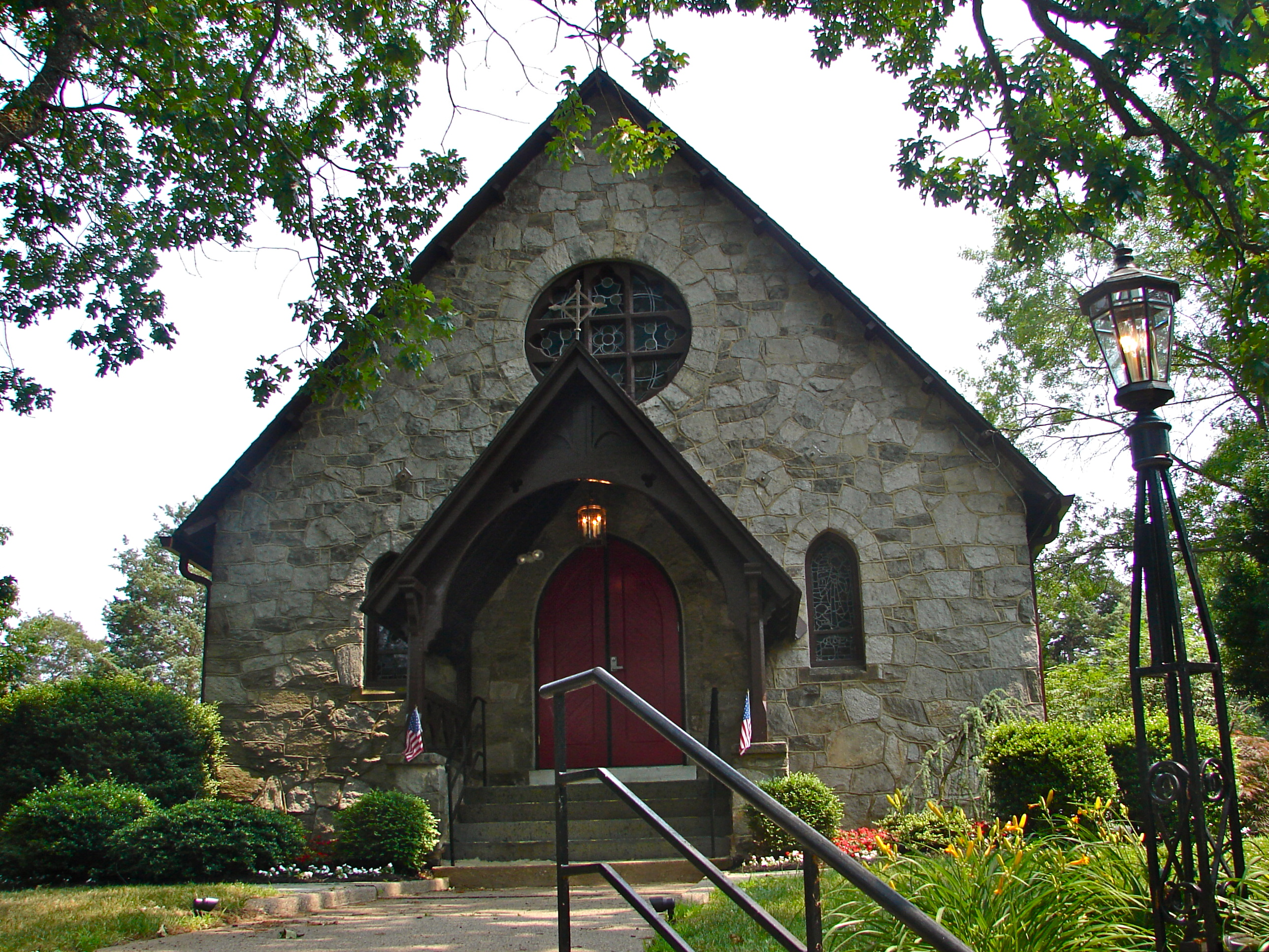
Church of Saint John the Evangelist, Runnemede, New Jersey (1881).

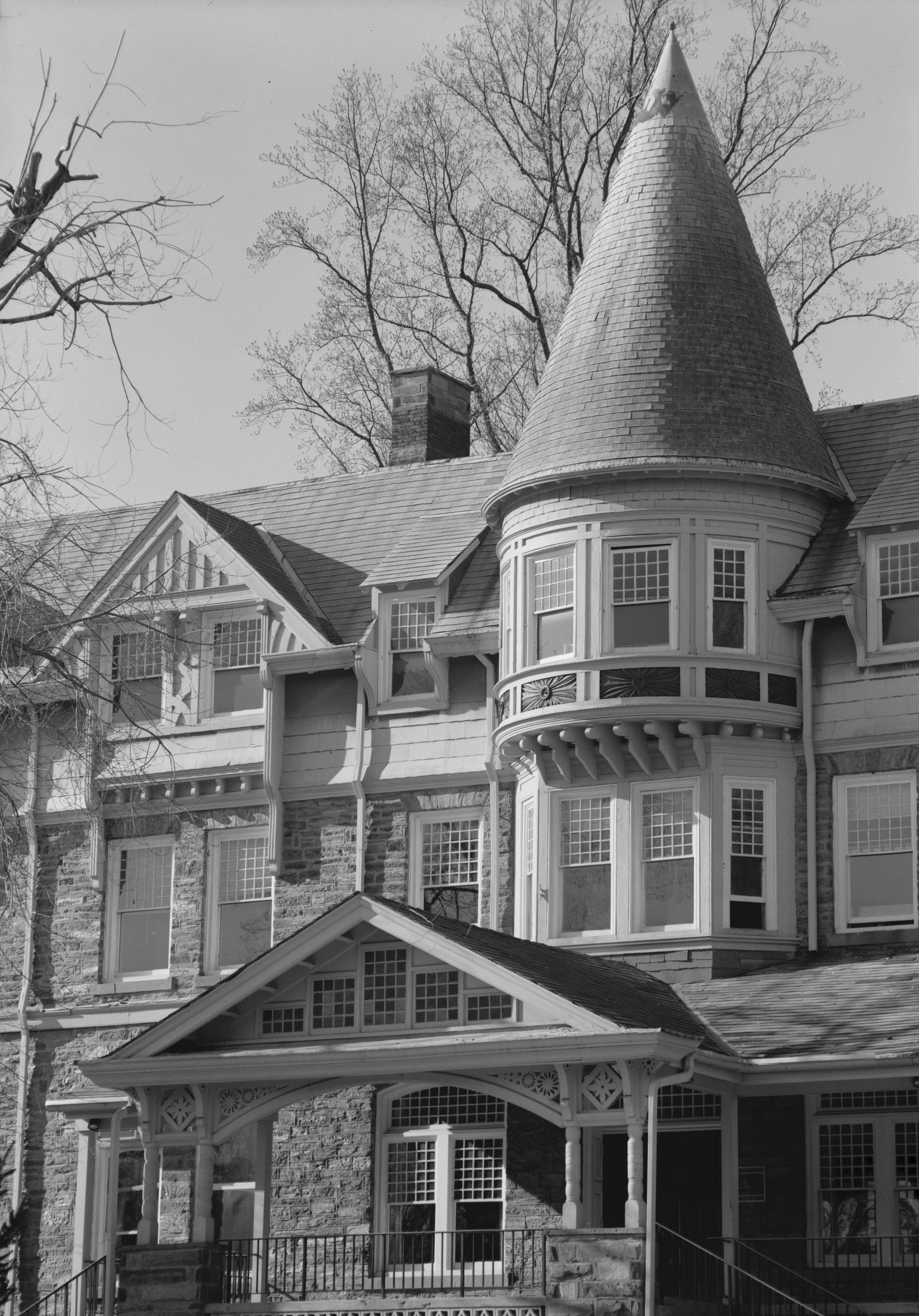
Wissahickon Inn, Chestnut Hill, Philadelphia, Pennsylvania (1883–84). Now Springside Chestnut Hill Academy.

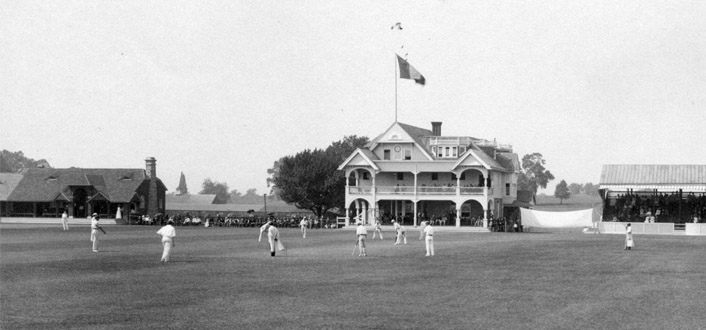
Philadelphia Cricket Club (first building), Chestnut Hill, Philadelphia, Pennsylvania (1883–84, burned 1909).

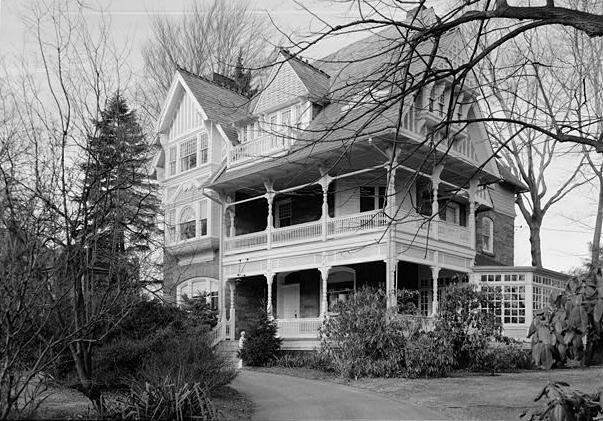
Houston-Sauveur House (1885), Chestnut Hill, Philadelphia, Pennsylvania. The Hewitts designed more than 100 houses in Chestnut Hill.

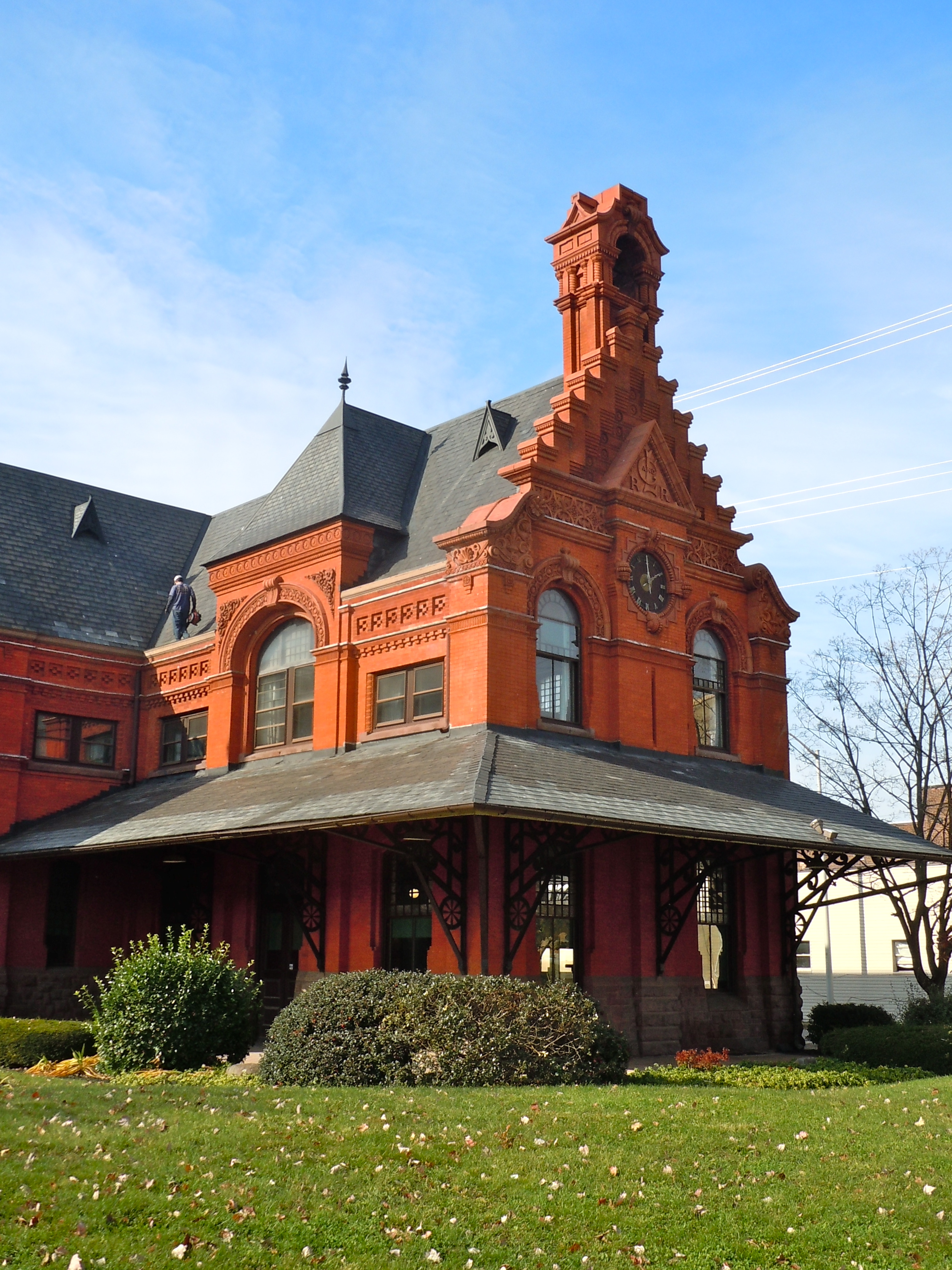
Cornwall & Lebanon Railroad Station, Lebanon, Pennsylvania (1885)

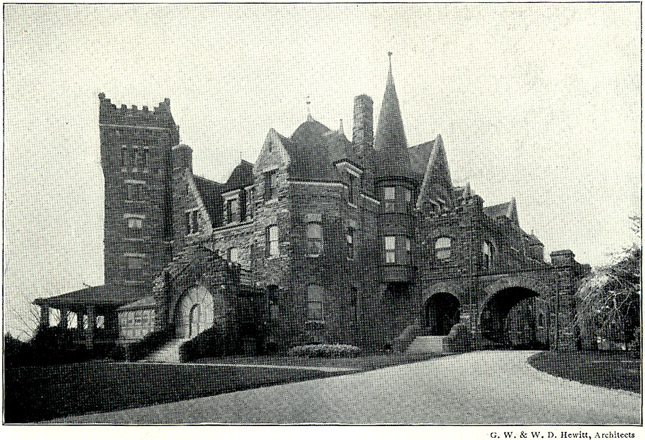
"Druim Moir" (Henry H. Houston Mansion), Chestnut Hill, Philadelphia, (1885–86)

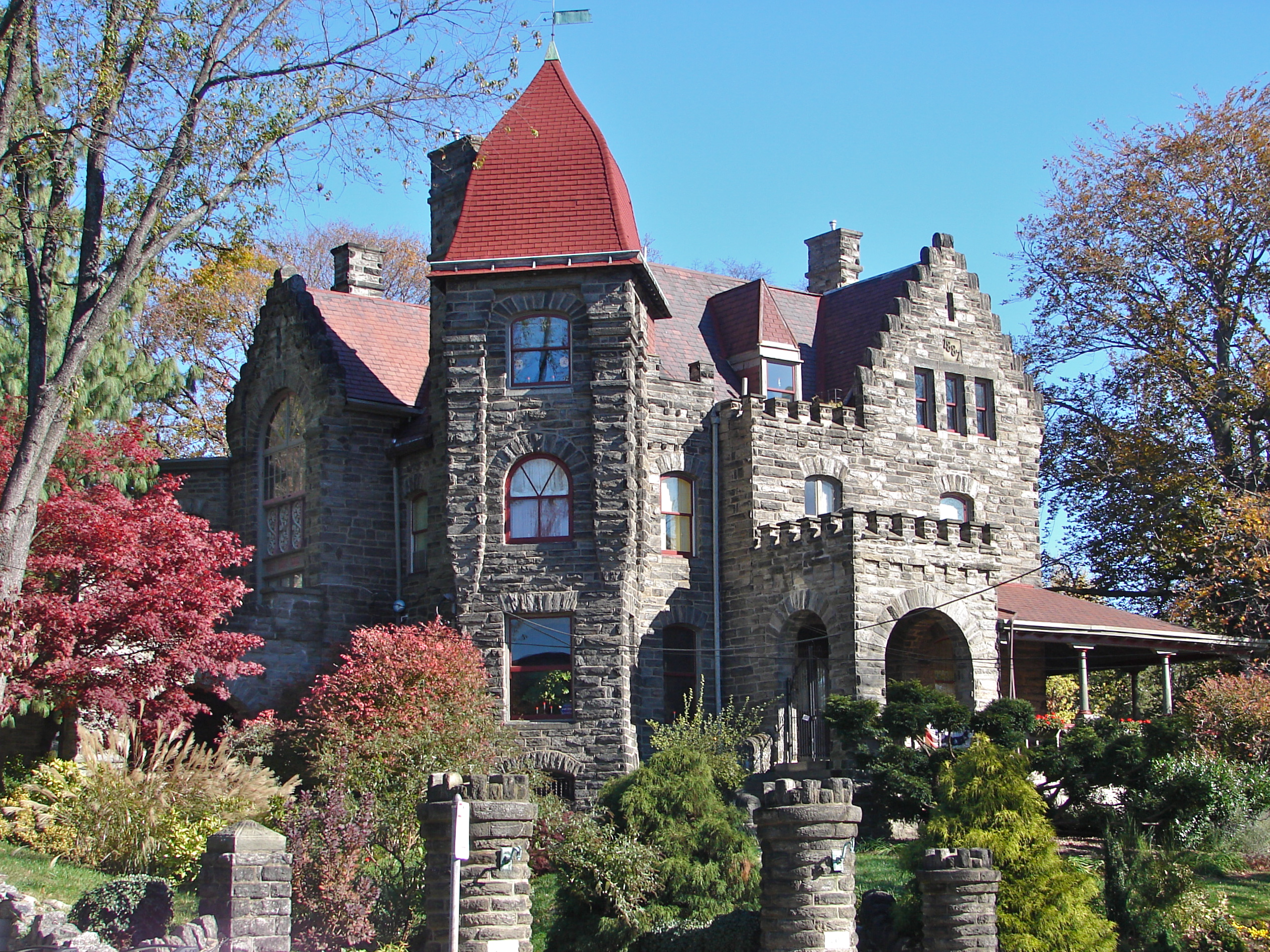
Henry Lister Townsend house, Germantown, Philadelphia, Pennsylvania (1887)

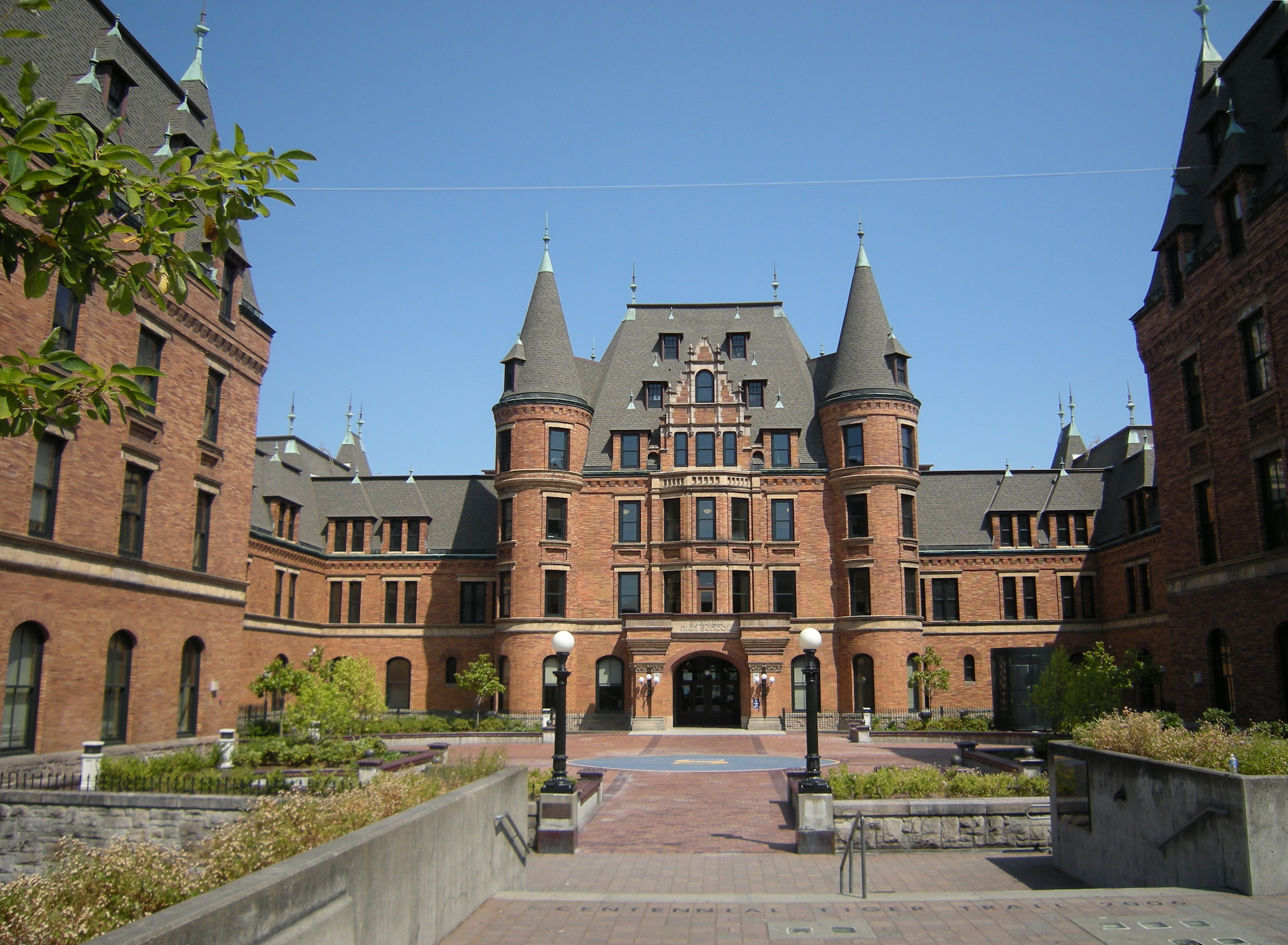
Olympic Hotel, Blackwell Point, Tacoma, Washington (1891–93). Now Stadium High School

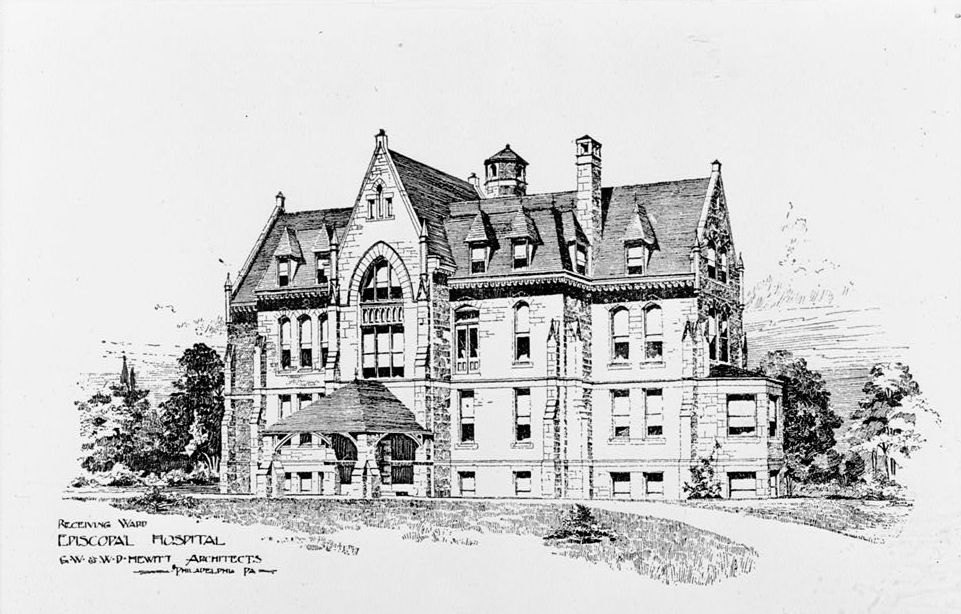
Receiving Ward, Episcopal Hospital, Philadelphia, Pennsylvania (1892–94, demolished)

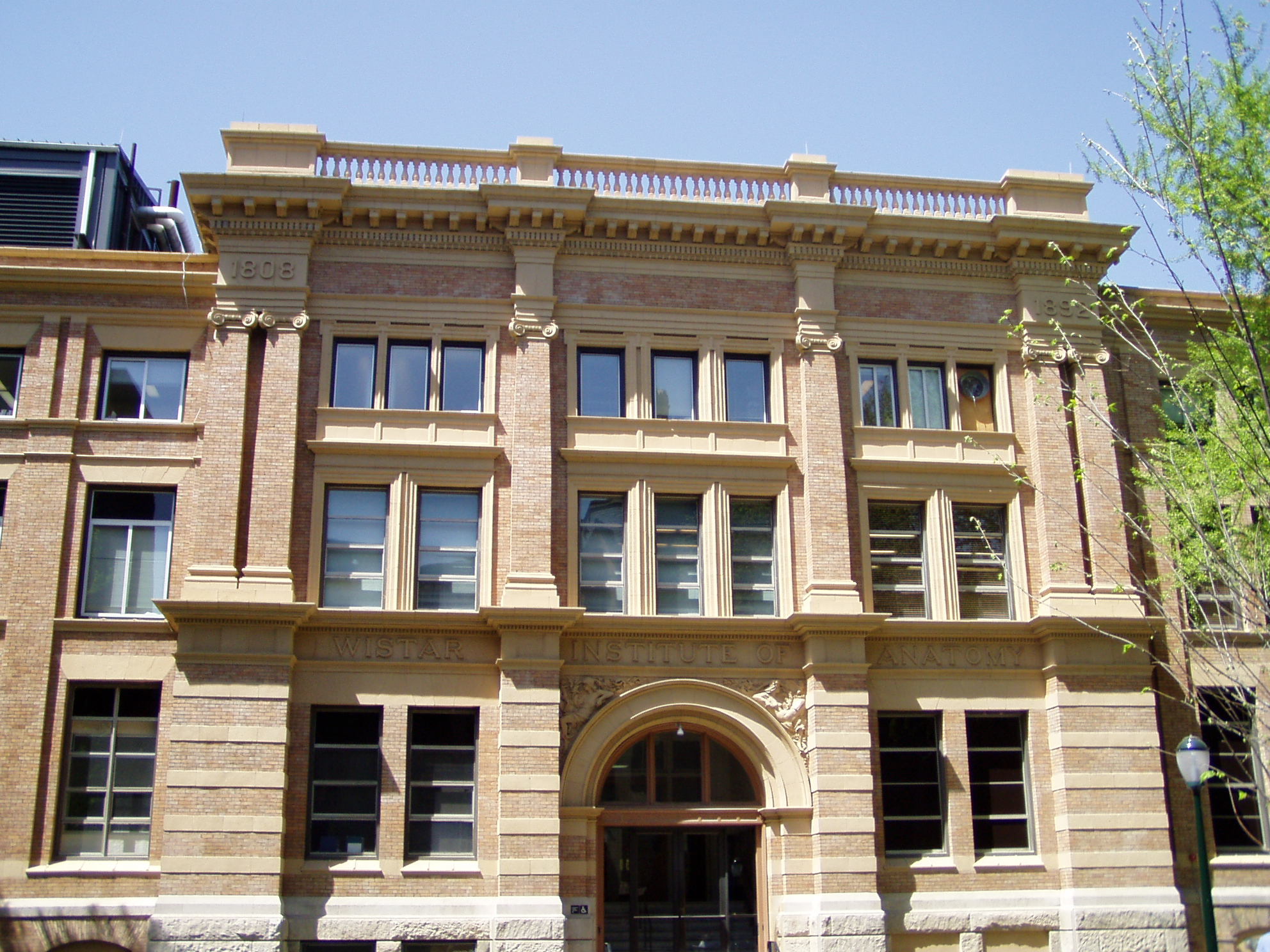
Wistar Institute, Philadelphia, Pennsylvania (1892–94)

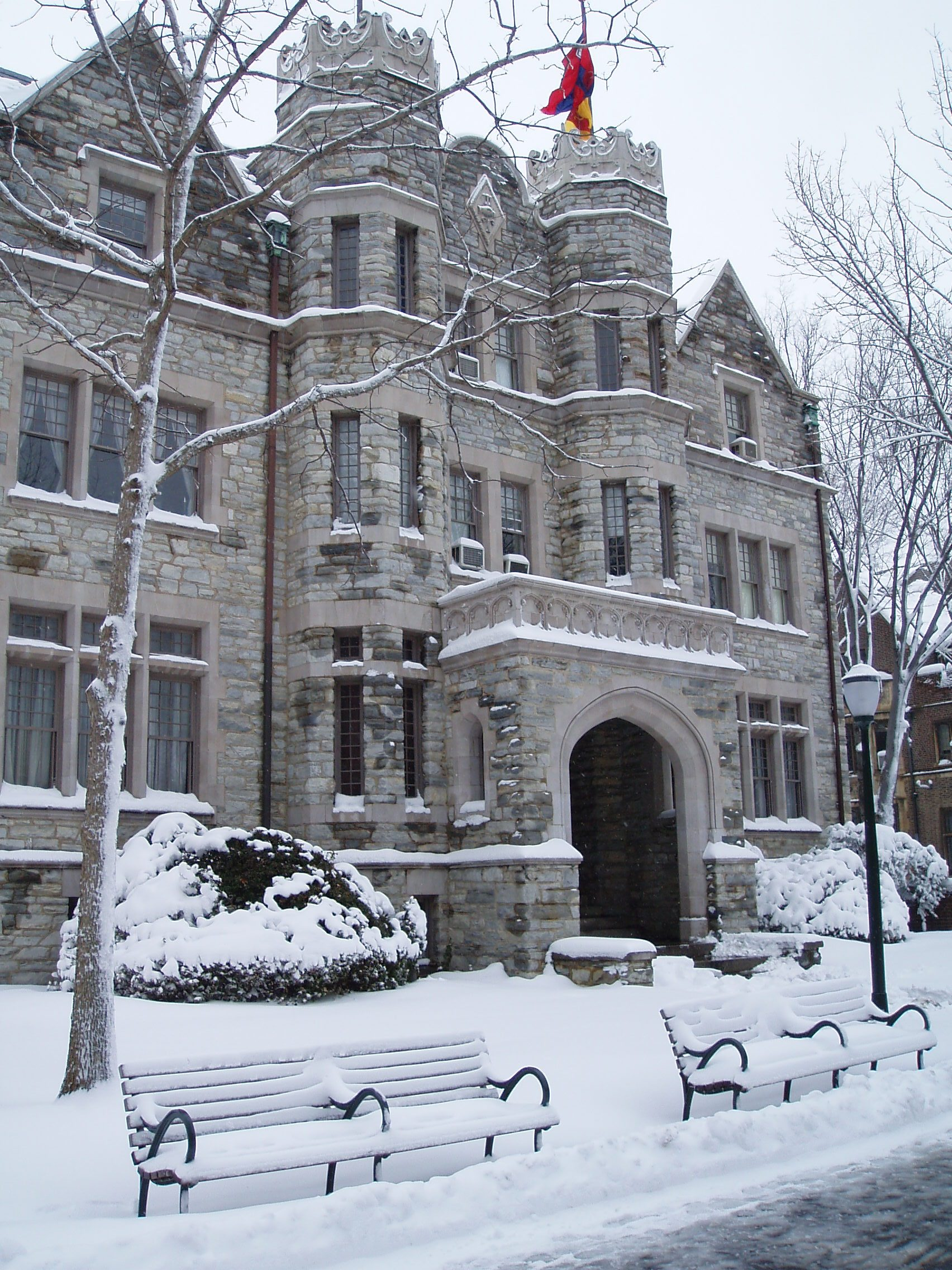
"The Castle" (Psi Upsilon fraternity), University of Pennsylvania, Philadelphia, Pennsylvania (1897–99)

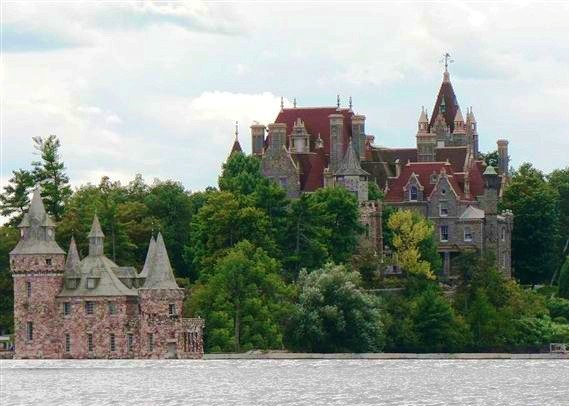
Boldt Castle, Heart Island, Alexandria Bay, New York (1900–04)

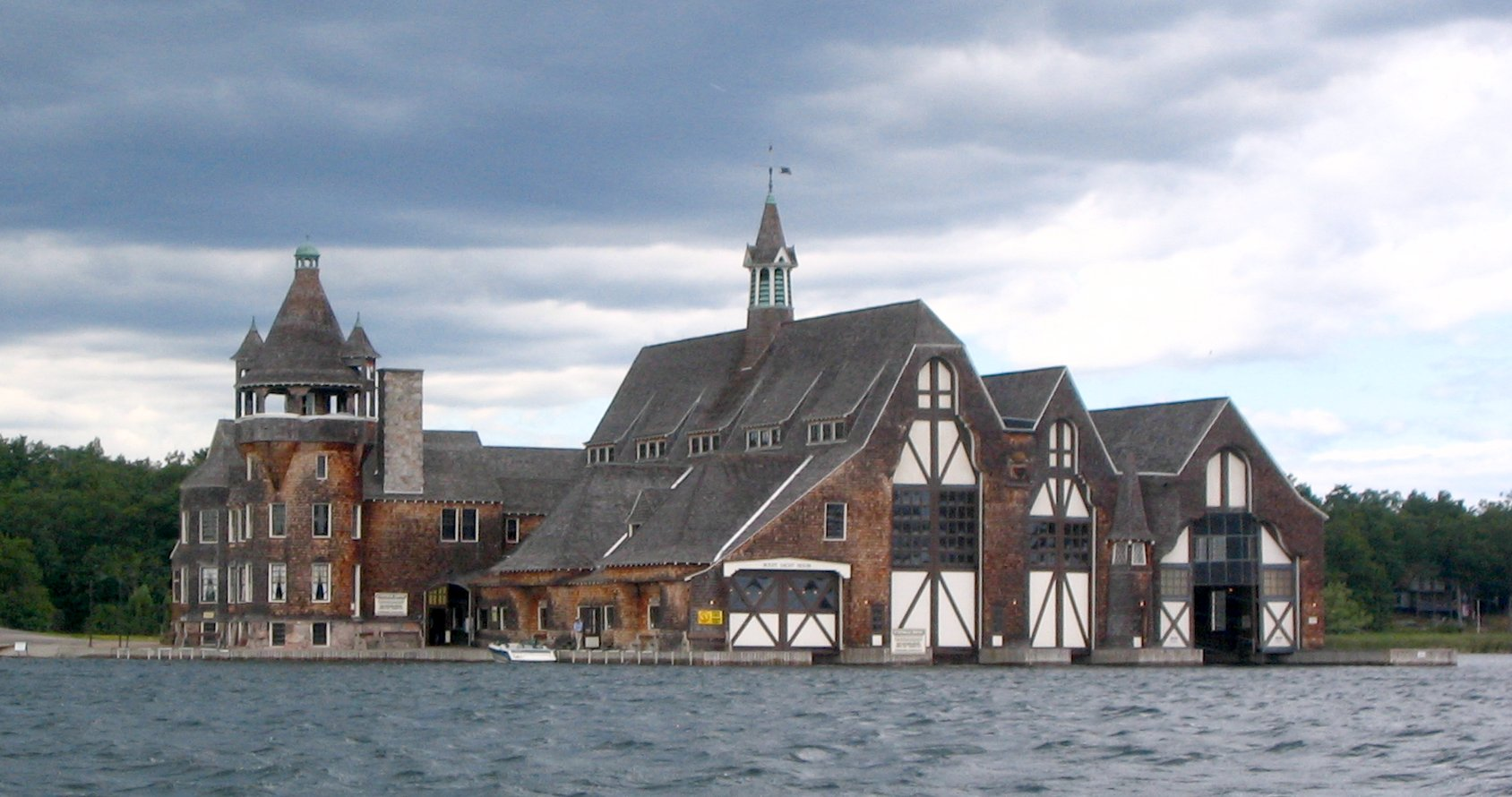
George C. Boldt Yacht House, Heart Island, Alexandria Bay, New York (1903)

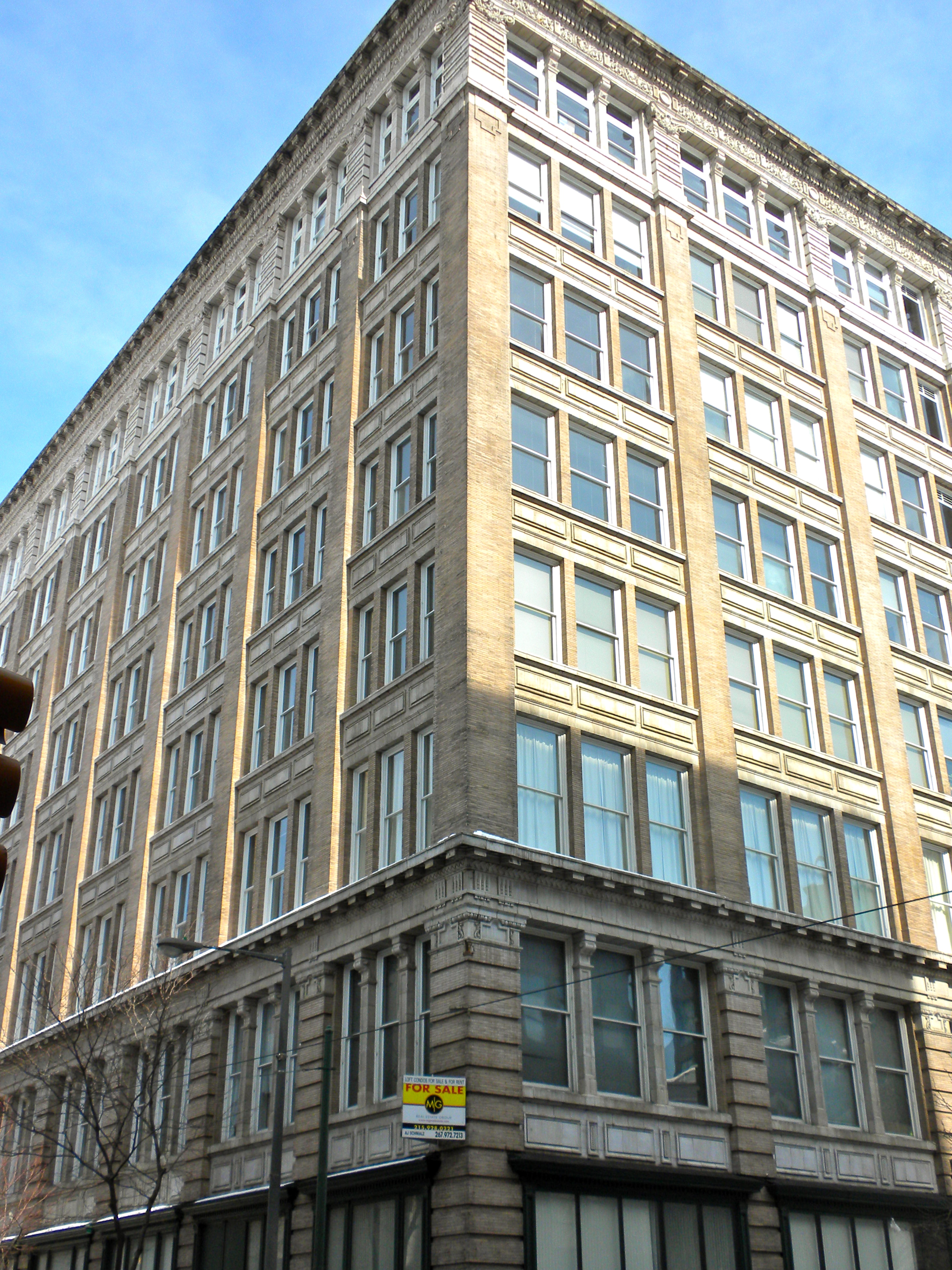
Pitcairn Building, 1027-31 Arch St., Philadelphia, Pennsylvania (1901)

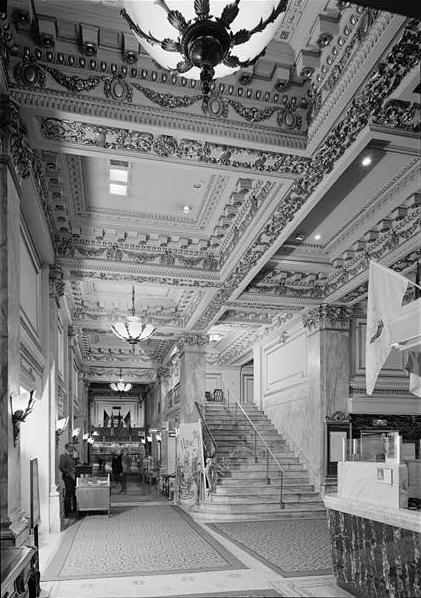
Lobby of The Bellevue-Stratford Hotel, Philadelphia, Pennsylvania (1902–04)
