= Maybrook Mansion =

Late 19th Century mansion in Pennsylvania

Coordinates: 40.0058°N 75.2724°W

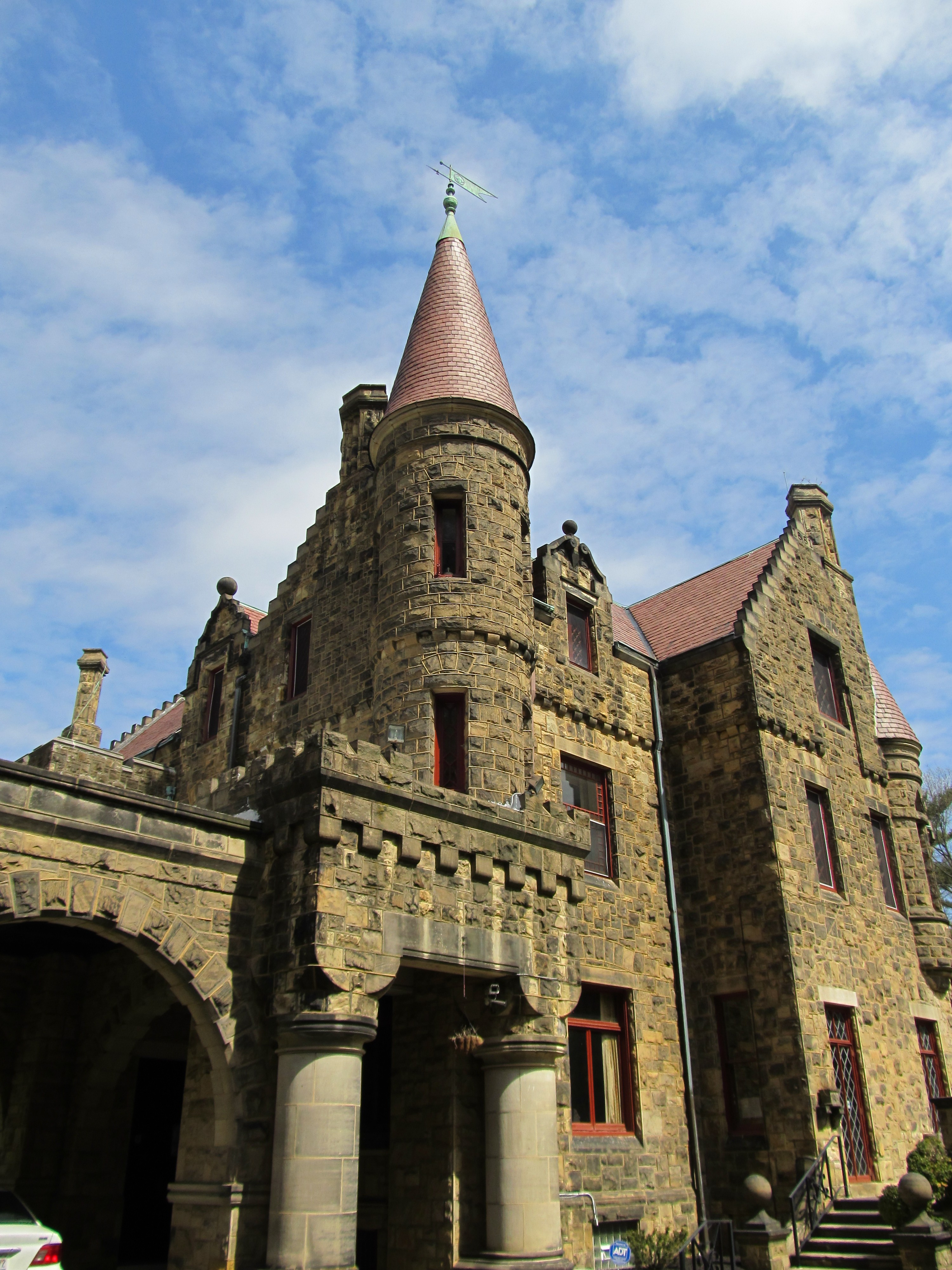
The tower at Maybrook mansion, Wynnewood, Pennsylvania

Maybrook is a mansion and property located in Wynnewood, Lower Merion Township, Pennsylvania in the Main Line suburban region just outside of Philadelphia. The mansion was built in 1881 as a summer home by liquor baron and real estate developer Henry C. Gibson and his wife, Mary B. Klett and six-year-old daughter Mary Klett "May" Gibson. Gibson named the property for his little daughter and the brook that runs through it.

== History ==
Maybrook was built on a 67-acre site most of which was formerly the estate of Welsh Quaker Robert Owen Jones. Gibson's interest in horticulture lead to the planting of oaks, maples, pines, and other evergreens on the former farmland. Rhododendron plants were also planted alongside the lawns and the stream that runs through the entire property.

Designed by renowned Philadelphia architects George Watson Hewitt and William D. Hewitt, the house was purportedly meant to look like a Medieval Norman castle in Scotland. Gibson imported English stonemasons to construct the 35-room mansion that has a gross area of 20,000 square feet with a 72-foot tower. It was finished in 1881 but had later additions added by Henry Gibson's daughter who inherited the property after his death including a library and a ballroom.

The exterior architecture was traditional “Main Line Gothic” in style, but the interior of the mansion was considered very modern for its time, with several hot air furnaces and hot running water. Gibson was an art collector and board member of the Pennsylvania Academy of the Fine Arts for two decades and his mansion was accordingly adorned with fine art, antiques, rugs, and furniture collected from his travels all over the world.

== Mary Klett Gibson ==
Henry Gibson died in 1891 after spending only ten summers in his so-called castle. Upon his death, the mansion was bequeathed to his 22-year-old daughter Mary Klett “May” Gibson. May never married but she did enjoy a lavish social life. In 1901 she hired George Watson and William D. Hewitt to design a ballroom 60 feet long and 50 feet high, fit for 400 people. The two story ballroom had ornately carved stone pillars, arched windows, and vaulted cathedral ceilings. A cloistered court was attached to the ballroom featuring stained glass windows by Violet Oakley, the first woman artist to receive a large commission for her work at the ornate capital building in Harrisburg. May also added a large library, a greenhouse, and a carriage house containing an artist studio for herself.

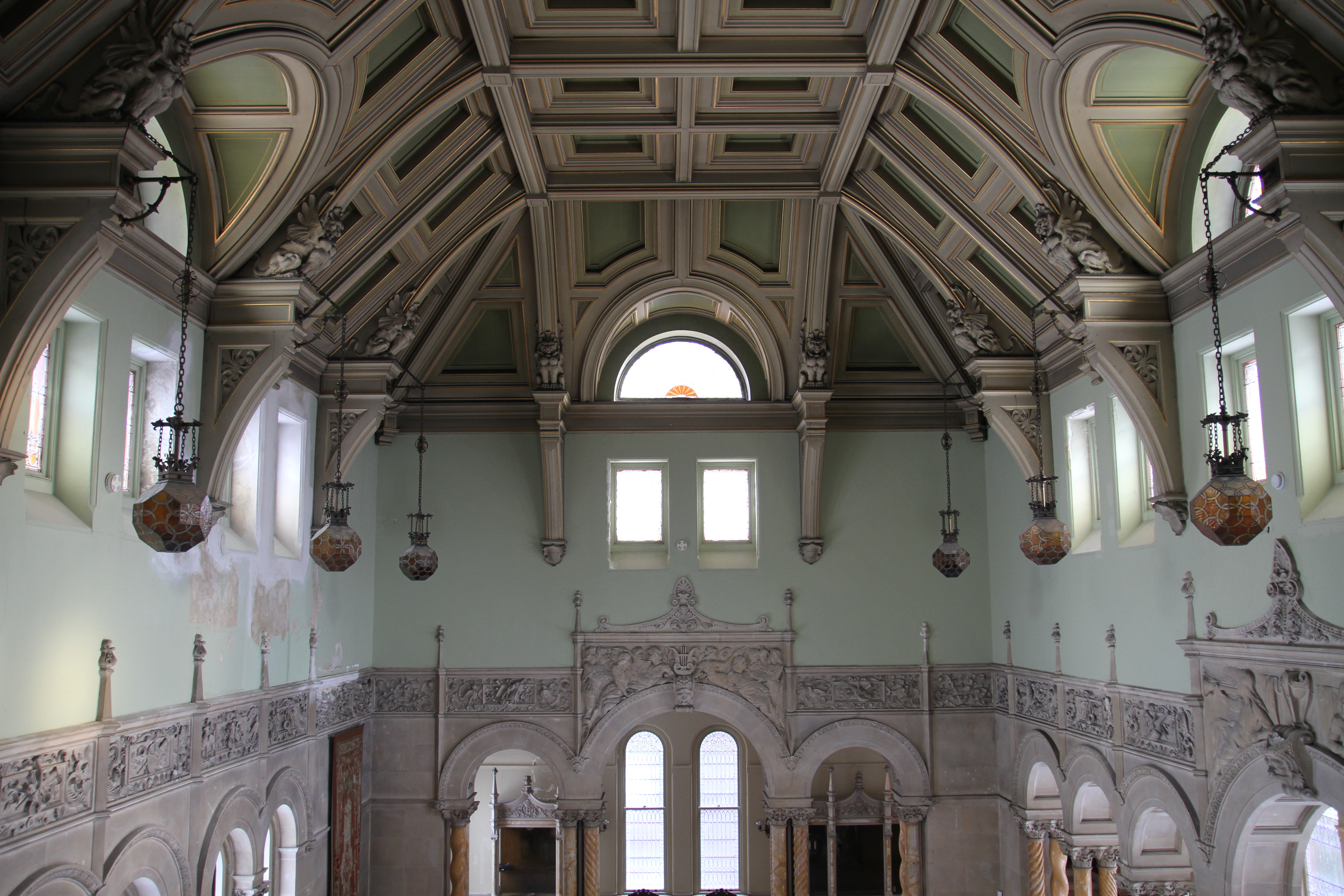
Vaulted ceilings inside Maybrook's 50 foot high ballroom in Wynnewood, Pennsylvania

May often invited the neighboring community to swim in Maybrook's pond in the summer and skate on it in the winter and had a slope built for sledding parties. She frequently opened her home to hold benefit parties for the long list of charities she supported and even hosted galas for her servants. During World War I May turned her estate into a training center for women volunteers called “Farmerettes” who assisted Pennsylvania farmers whose sons had gone off to war. During this time about 60 women volunteers lived at Maybrook learning to care for livestock. During World War II she helped displaced children including many from the London Blitz by allowing them to stay in her home for the duration of the war.

== John W. Merriam ==
In 1950 May Gibson sold almost 10 acres in the southeast corner of the property to John W. Merriam, a real estate developer and arts patron who built the 220 unit Thomas Wynne Apartments there. In 1956 May sold the remainder of the property to Merriam and he moved into the mansion with his wife Ruth. Ruth Merriam died in 1988 and in 1992 John married Elizabeth (Betty) Lockyer who had been his secretary for forty years prior to their marriage. John Merriam died in 1994 leaving his entire estate valued at $95 million to his wife Elizabeth. Merriam was a longtime patron of the arts and after his death his wife Elizabeth carried out his wishes and donated a large portion of his estate to four Philadelphia area arts and educational institutions.

In 2000, four months before she died, Betty Elizabeth Lockyer Merriam transferred the Maybrook property to her son Robert Lockyer (from a previous marriage that ended in divorce) who was head of Merloc Partners. The Maybrook mansion itself is set to become a community and cultural center for Lower Merion Township.
