= Drexel Development Historic District =

Historic district in Pennsylvania, United States

- U.S. National Register of Historic Places
- U.S. Historic district
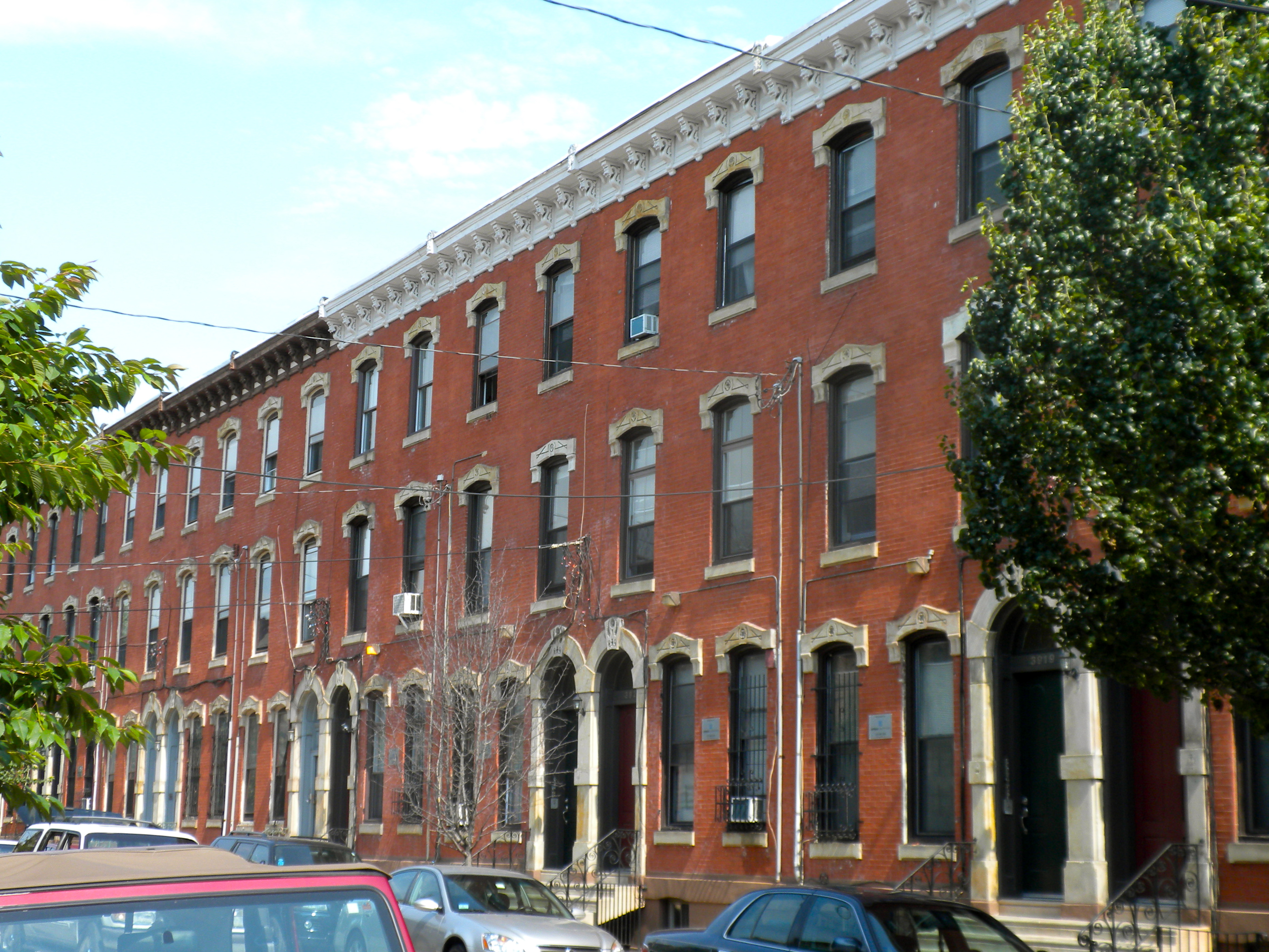
- Drexel Development Historic District, May 2010

- Location within Philadelphia Location within Pennsylvania Location within the United States
- Location: Roughly bounded by Pine, Delancy, 39th and 40th Sts., Philadelphia, Pennsylvania
- Coordinates: 39°57′3″N 75°12′9″W
- Area: 1 acre (0.40 ha)
- Built: 1870
- Architect: Samuel Sloan; G.W. & W.D. Hewitt
- Architectural style: Second Empire, Italianate, High Victorian
- NRHP reference No.: 82001546
- Added to NRHP: November 14, 1982

Drexel Development Historic District is a national historic district located in the University City neighborhood of Philadelphia, Pennsylvania. It encompasses 96 contributing rowhouses dated to the mid- to late-19th century. A number of the rowhouses were designed by architect Samuel Sloan. The architectural firm G. W. & W. D. Hewitt designed rowhouses for developer Anthony Joseph Drexel on the block bounded by Pine, new 39th, Baltimore, and 40th Streets. They are representative of a number of popular architectural styles including Second Empire, Italianate, and High Victorian.

It was added to the National Register of Historic Places in 1982.
