= St. Peter's Episcopal Church of Germantown =

Historic church in Pennsylvania, United States

- U.S. National Register of Historic Places
- U.S. Historic district – Contributing property
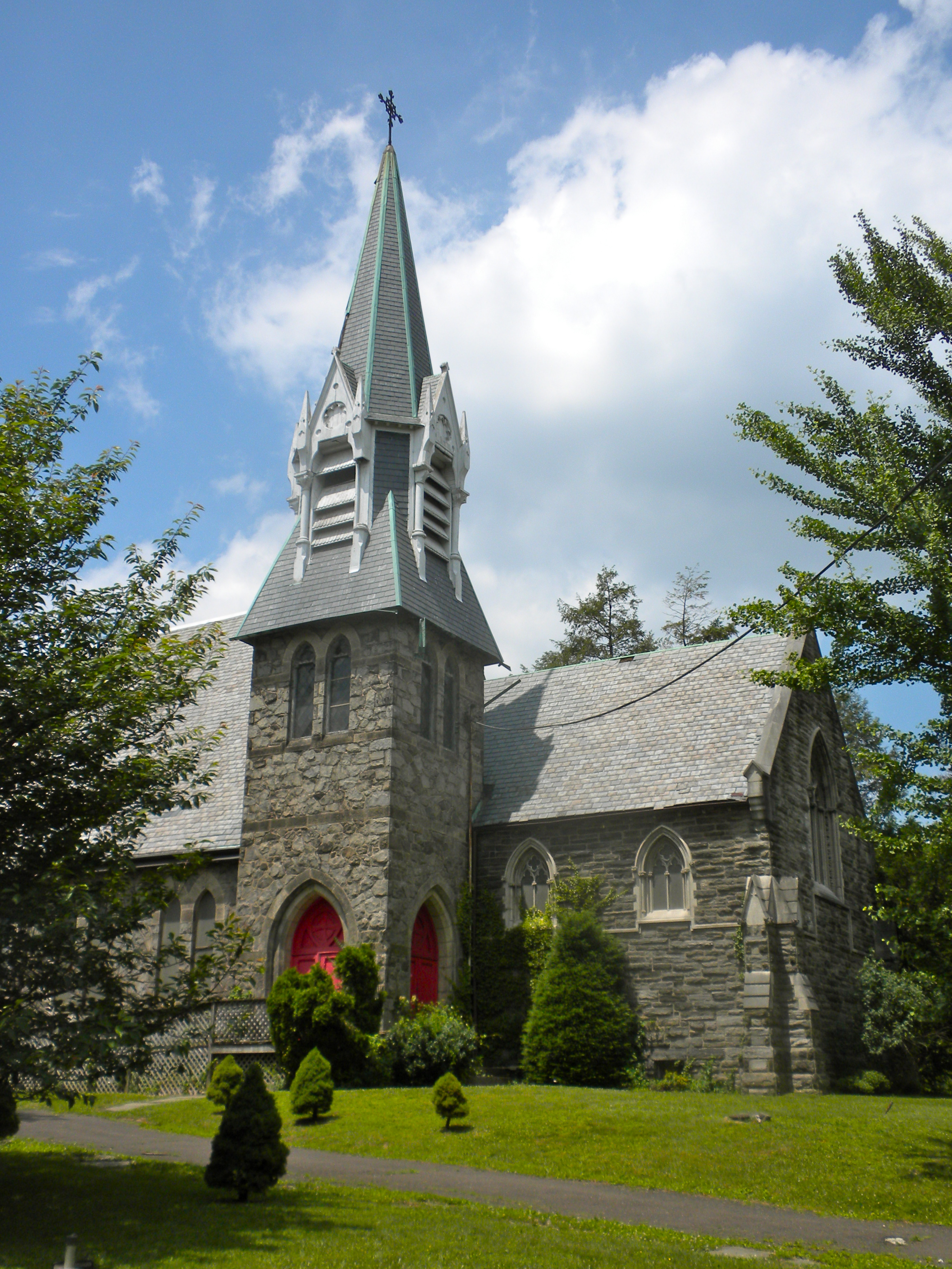

- Location within Philadelphia Location within Pennsylvania Location within the United States
- Location: 6000 Wayne Ave., Philadelphia, Pennsylvania
- Coordinates: 40°2′2″N 75°11′2″W
- Area: less than one acre
- Built: 1873
- Architect: Furness & Hewitt
- Architectural style: Gothic
- NRHP reference No.: 85001960
- Added to NRHP: September 05, 1985

St. Peter's Episcopal Church of Germantown is a historic church at 6000 Wayne Avenue in the Germantown section of Philadelphia, Pennsylvania. It was built in 1873 to the designs of Furness & Hewitt. George W. Hewitt likely was mainly responsible for the design, but the influence of Frank Furness is readily seen in the exuberant proportions of the steeple.

The church was built as part of the suburban development of the area by Henry H. Houston and Houston served as Church Warden for many years.

The church was added to the National Register of Historic Places in 1985. It is a contributing property of the Tulpehocken Station Historic District.

It is currently (2022) the campus of the Waldorf School of Philadelphia.
