= Pitcairn Building =

- U.S. National Register of Historic Places
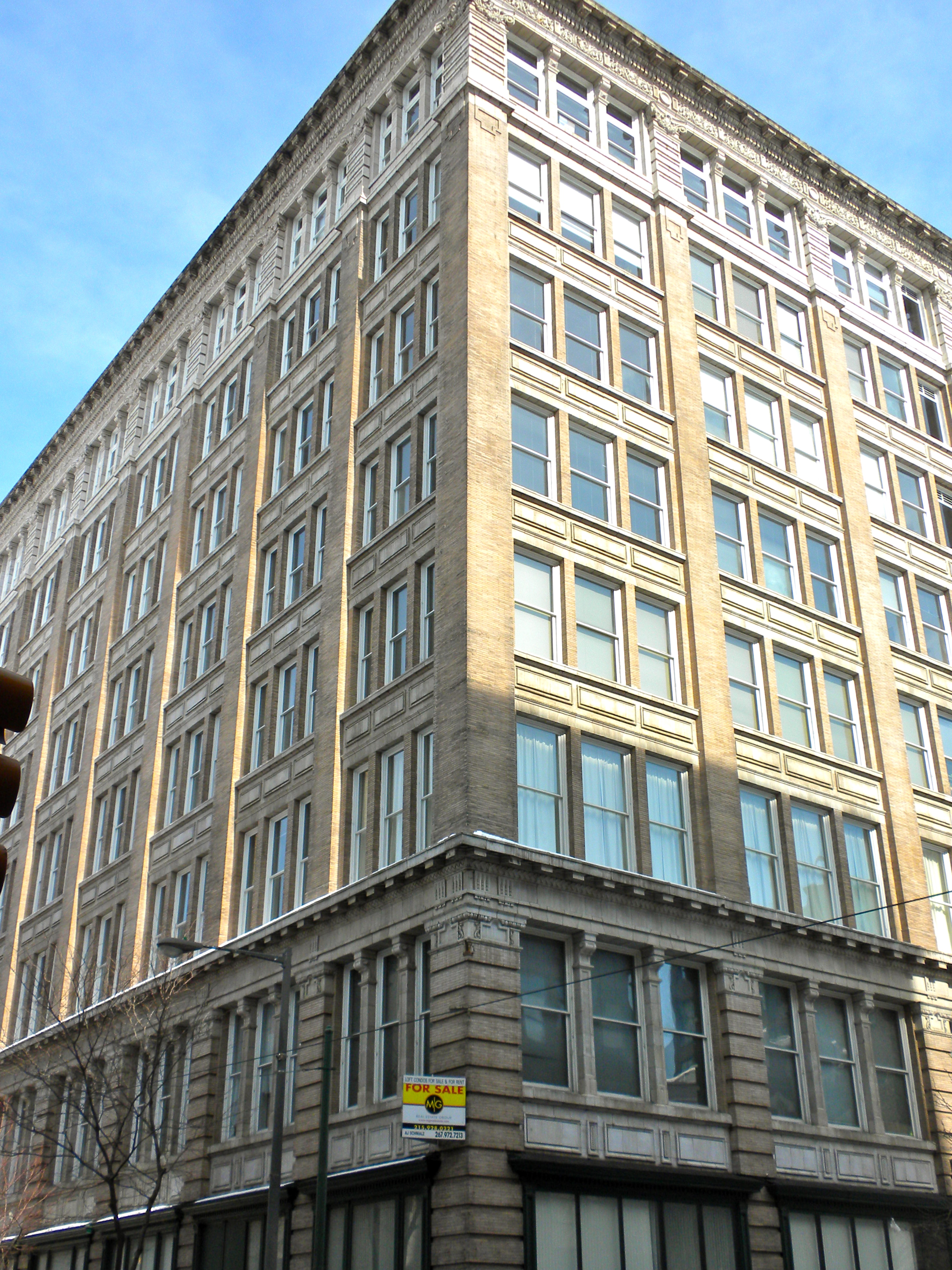
- (February 2010)

- Location within Philadelphia Location within Pennsylvania Location within the United States
- Location: 1027 Arch St. Philadelphia, Pennsylvania
- Coordinates: 39°57′13″N 75°9′28″W
- Built: 1901
- Architect: G. W. & W. D. Hewitt
- Architectural style: English Baroque
- NRHP reference No.: 87002209
- Added to NRHP: January 7, 1988

The Pitcairn Building, also known as the Pittsburgh Plate Glass Company Building, is an historic warehouse and light manufacturing loft building that is located at 1027 Arch Street at the corner of North 11th Street in the Chinatown neighborhood of Philadelphia, Pennsylvania, United States.

It was added to the National Register of Historic Places in 1988.

== History and architectural features ==
This historic structure was designed by noted Philadelphia architects G. W. & W. D. Hewitt and built in 1901. It is an eight-story, steel-frame building that was clad in brick and granite with terra cotta details. The building, which measures approximately 74 feet wide and 172 feet deep, was originally built as a regional distribution center for the Pittsburgh Plate Glass Company. It later housed a clothing manufacturer, H. Daroff and Sons, who originated the "Botany 500" brand.

== See also ==
- National Register of Historic Places listings in Center City, Philadelphia
