= Philadelphia Bourse =

Commodities exchange in Philadelphia, Pennsylvania, US

Philadelphia Bourse Building
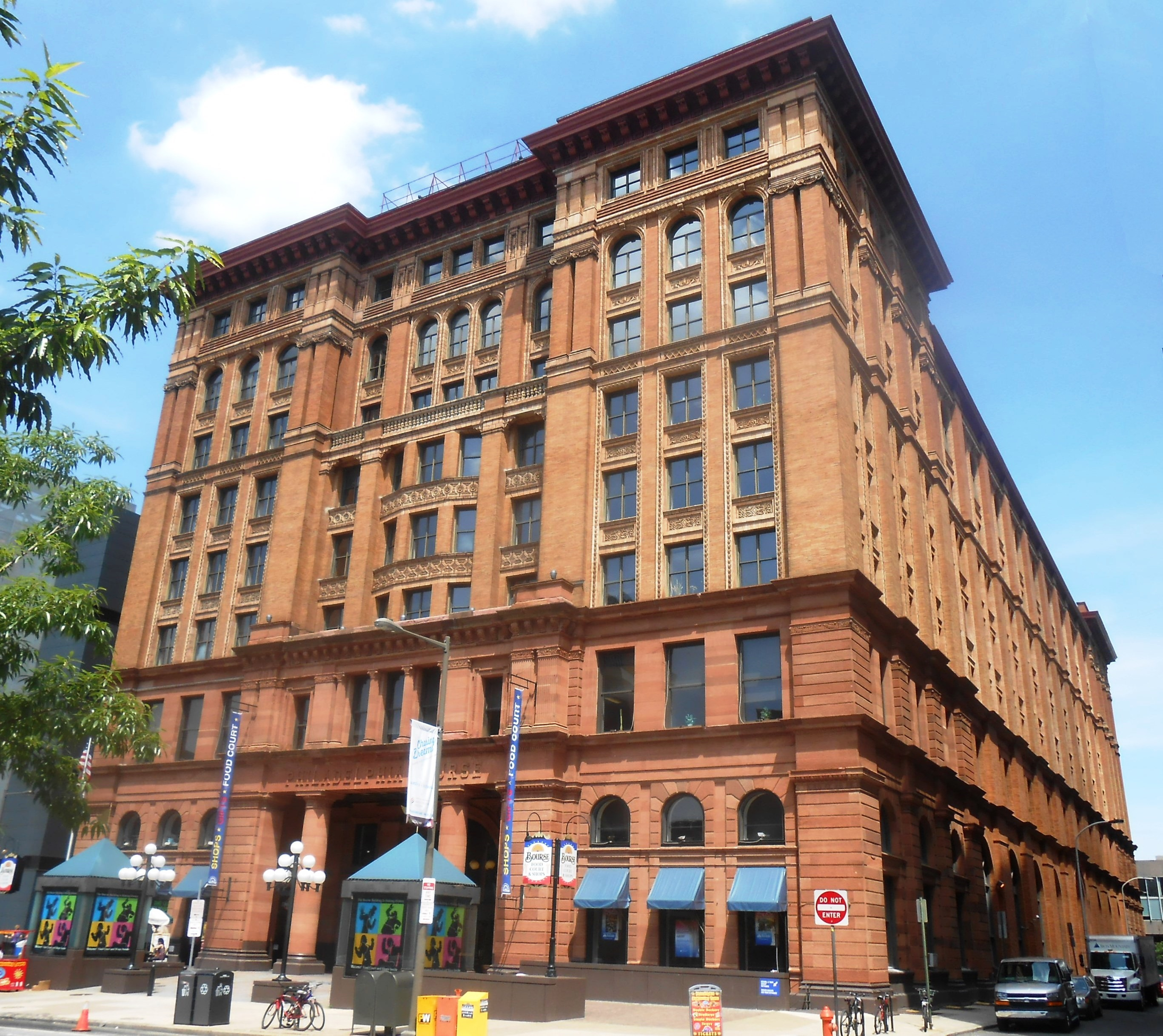
- (2014)

- Location within Philadelphia

General information
- Location: 13 South 5th Street; Philadelphia, Pennsylvania
- Coordinates: 39°56′59″N 75°8′54″W
- Construction started: 1893
- Completed: 1895
- Owner: Keystone Property Group and Lubert‑Adler Real Estate Funds

Height
- Roof: 125 feet (38 m)

Technical details
- Floor count: 9
- Floor area: 280,000 square feet (26,000 m^{2})

Design and construction
- Architect: G. W. & W. D. Hewitt
- Developer: Keystone Property Group and Lubert‑Adler Real Estate Funds

The Philadelphia Bourse was a commodities exchange founded in 1891 by George E. Bartol, a grain and commodities exporter, who modeled it after the Bourse in Hamburg, Germany. The steel-framed building—one of the first to be constructed—was built from 1893 to 1895 and was designed by G. W. & W. D. Hewitt in the Beaux‑Arts style. Carlisle redstone, Pompeian buff brick and terra cotta were all used in the facade. The building was sold in 1979 to Kaiserman Company and underwent extensive renovations, bringing the internal usable surface to approximately 286,000 square feet (26,000 m²). In 2016, MRP Realty took ownership and invested US$40 million in renovations. In mid‑2024, MRP Realty sold the Bourse to a joint venture of Keystone Property Group and Lubert‑Adler Real Estate Funds, which plans a mixed‑use redevelopment of the landmark. The building now houses office space anchored by Digitas, a subsidiary of Publicis Groupe.

== History ==
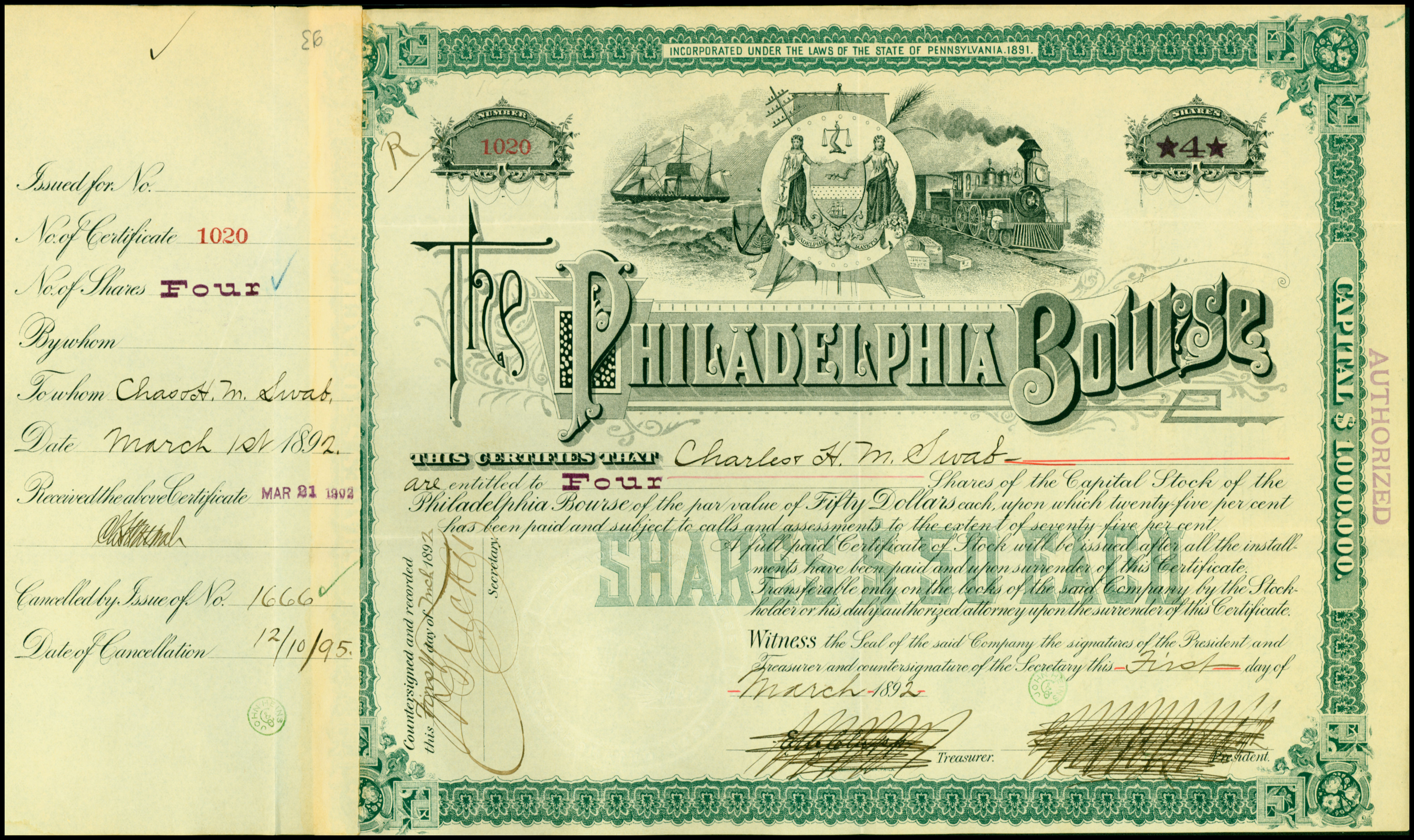
Share of the Philadelphia Bourse, issued March 1, 1892

Upon his return from a European trip in 1890, Bartol organized the Philadelphia business community. He asked each new member to pledge $1,000 to the project. The Bourse motto was "Buy, Sell, Ship via Philadelphia."

The Bourse stopped functioning as a commodities exchange in the 1960s. The structure continued to serve as an office building until 1979, when it was sold and renovated to include upscale retail space on floors near the street level. The upper levels of the building continued to house office space. A movie theatre specializing in independent films, The Ritz at the Bourse, sits across the street at 4th and Ranstead streets.

In 2018, a two‑year rehabilitation created a brand‑new food hall with 30 vendors.

The building is listed on the National Register of Historic Places.

== Today ==
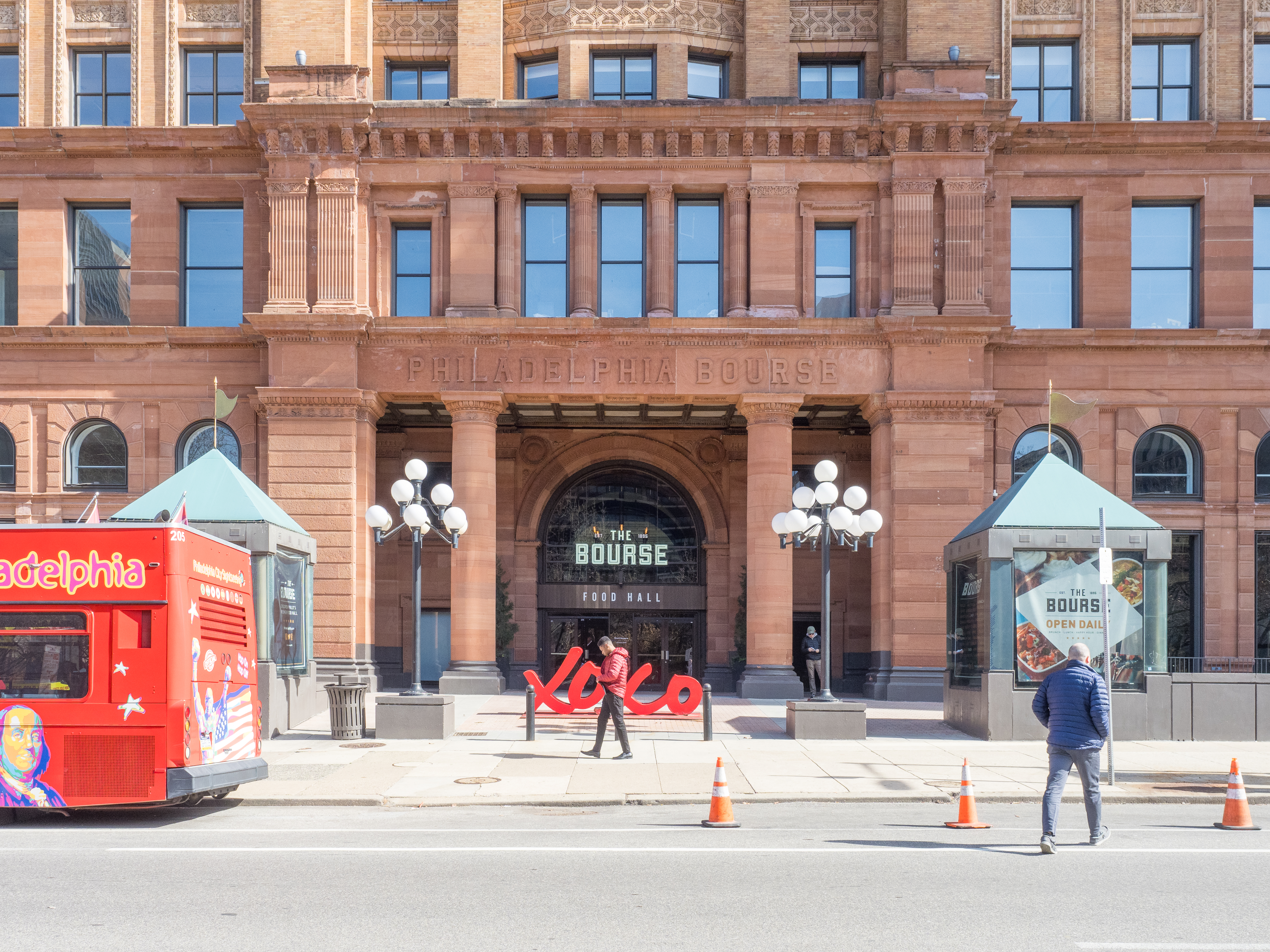
Food Hall Entrance (2024)

After a two-year rehabilitation, The Bourse reopened as a modern food hall with 30 vendors in November 2018. However, the COVID‑19 pandemic severely impacted these businesses and as of June 2024 all the restaurants are closed and abandoned. A joint venture led by Keystone Property Group and Lubert‑Adler Real Estate Funds acquired the building in mid‑2024 and announced plans to redevelop the historic property into a mixed‑use complex featuring a Hilton Tapestry Collection hotel, office space anchored by Digitas (a subsidiary of Publicis Groupe) and retail and dining concepts operated by Cook N’ Solo. Financing for the redevelopment is being provided by KKR, and construction is expected to be complete by 2027.

=== Tenants ===
- Diversified Lighting
- MakeOffices
- Mexican Consulate
- Piano
- Society Hill Dental
- Jasonxpan
- Allen & Gerritsen
