= Botany 500 =

American menswear company

Botany 500 is an American brand of menswear & suits that was originally part of a firm based in Philadelphia and New York City. The name lives on today as a licensed property by several foreign clothing manufacturers.

== Manufacturing ==
Botany 500 was a brand name owned by the Botany 500 Group of New York. Their men's suits and sport coats were manufactured in Philadelphia, Pennsylvania, by H. Daroff and Sons, who were contracted with Botany Mills of Passaic, New Jersey, to produce products and later bought the firm outright. Their plant was located at 23rd and Walnut Streets during the 1940s, 1950s, and beyond. Until 1945, it was located in the Pitcairn Building at 1027 Arch Street. They also produced another line called Worsted-Tex that had the image of the head of a German Shepherd dog on its label. The office, on the first floor of the plant, had a stuffed German shepherd standing guard. The seventh and topmost floor contained the top coat design department and a fabric cutting floor.

=== Decline ===
Daroff and Sons and the Botany 500 group went bankrupt in August 1973. An attempt was made to turn the company over to another company, named Cohen and Sons, which was still operating profitably. Because of resistance by the company's employees, Cohen backed out of the deal by the end of September. When Daroff finally closed its doors in December 1973, Cohen and Sons bought the Botany 500 name and assets for $4 million. They planned to keep the labels, marketing, sales, and distribution of Botany as a separate Botany 500 line which was produced at 2700 N. Broad St in Philadelphia.

With the garment business taking a downturn during the second half of the decade, the Botany and Cohen and Sons operations ceased production in Philadelphia in 1986. The building was sold in 1989 for $1.75 million. Production of the Botany label was moved to a sister company within the corporate owner's portfolio previously known as Cross Country Clothes which had facilities in Northampton and Whitehall PA. The combined company was renamed as The 500 Fashion Group which manufactured suits and sportcoats. The Botany 500 label for men's tailored clothing was produced in Northampton/Whitehall until 1995. At that point, the decision was made by the investors in the parent corporation (E-II Corporation) to liquidate the four companies which the corporation held. As no buyer could be found for a unionized apparel manufacturer in the Northeast, The 500 Fashion Group was closed.

The Botany 500 label was sold and manufacturing under the Botany 500 name was then outsourced to foreign companies. In 2021, the Botany 500 name resurfaced as a brand name sold by the mail-order company Haband as it appeared in their fall 2021 catalogue.

== Promotion ==
Botany 500 provided wardrobe for many game show hosts and television presenters, including Bob Barker on The Price Is Right, Richard Dawson on Family Feud, Rod Serling on The Twilight Zone and Phil Donahue of The Phil Donahue Show.

In addition, the company also provided the wardrobes for Joey Bishop on The Joey Bishop Show, Danny Thomas on Make Room for Daddy, John Ericson on Honey West, John Newland on Alcoa Presents: One Step Beyond, Dick Van Dyke on The Dick Van Dyke Show, Don Adams on Get Smart, Glen Campbell on The Glen Campbell Goodtime Hour, Mike Connors on Mannix, Telly Savalas on Kojak, Bob Newhart on The Bob Newhart Show, Dick Sargent on Bewitched, Brian Keith and Sebastian Cabot on Family Affair, Sherman Hemsley on The Jeffersons, Lyle Waggoner on Wonder Woman, Peter Graves on Mission: Impossible, Jack Klugman on Quincy, M.E., Bill Macy and Conrad Bain on Maude, and James Pritchett on The Doctors. Ryan O’Neal's wardrobe was furnished by Botany 500 in his movie Love Story. James Earl Jones's wardrobe was furnished by Botany 500 in the movie Claudine, as was wardrobe for Flip Wilson on The Flip Wilson Show in the 1970s. Botany 500 was also credited with furnishing men's wardrobe for cast members of the 1977 television film Raid on Entebbe.

Botany 500 also provided wardrobes for Tom Kennedy on Body Language, Monty Hall on Let's Make a Deal, Jack Barry on The Joker's Wild, Wink Martindale on Tic-Tac-Dough, Jim Perry on Card Sharks, Bill Cullen on Blockbusters, and Bob Eubanks on The New Newlywed Game and Card Sharks. The classic TV series The Odd Couple listed Worsted-Tex in its closing credits (essentially dressing Jack Klugman for two series); Worsted-Tex also provided the wardrobes for Gene Barry on Burke's Law and Mike Connors on Mannix (Season 3 end credits).
