= Druim Moir Historic District =

Historic district in Pennsylvania, United States

- U.S. National Register of Historic Places
- U.S. Historic district
- U.S. Historic district – Contributing property
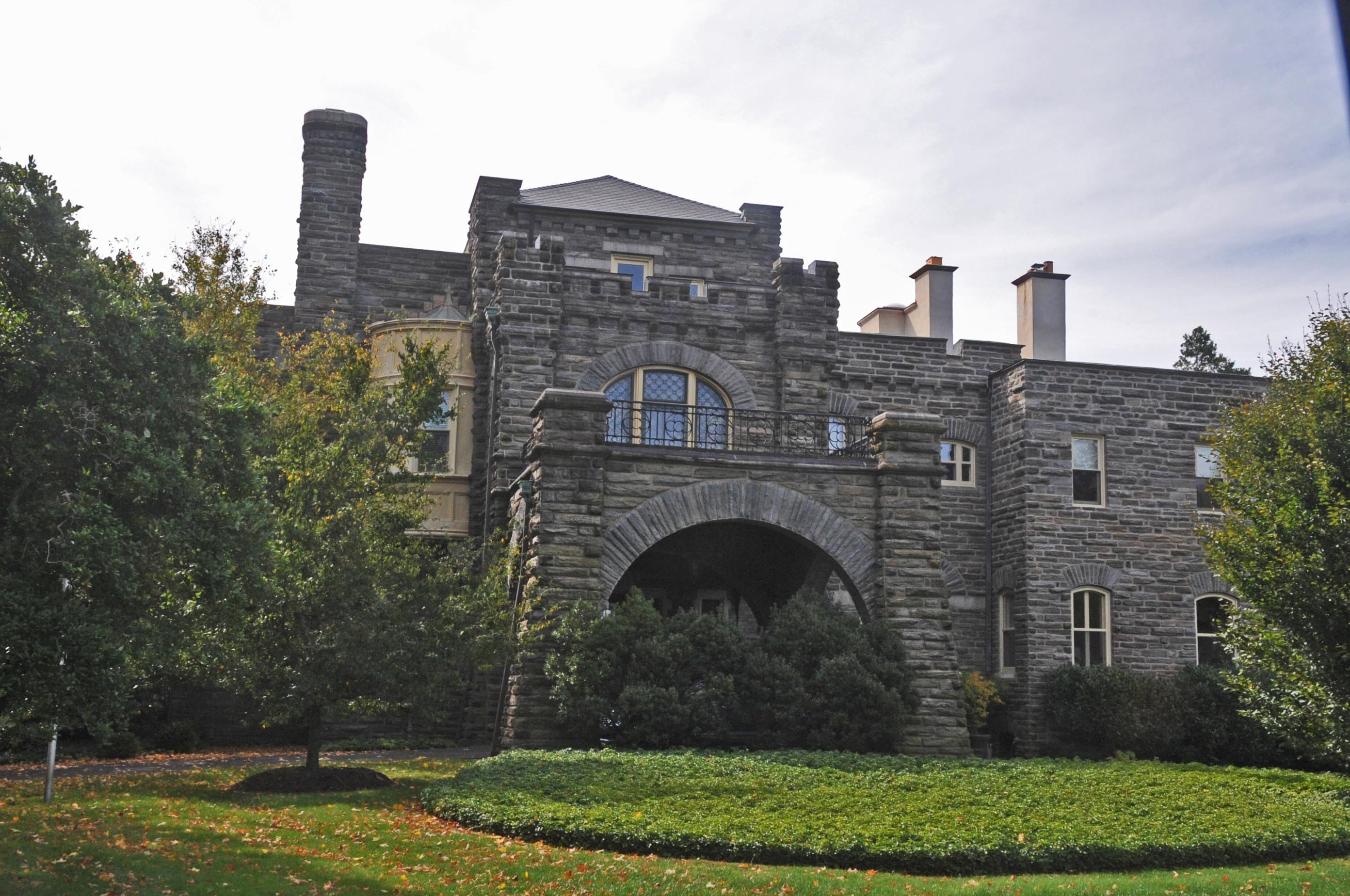
- Druim Moir castle

- Location within Philadelphia Location within Pennsylvania Location within the United States
- Location: Bounded by Fairmount Park, Cherokee St., Hartwell Lane and Valley Green Rd., Philadelphia, Pennsylvania
- Coordinates: 40°3′33″N 75°12′52″W
- Area: 47.5 acres (19.2 ha)
- Built: 1886
- Architect: G. W. & W. D. Hewitt; Robert Rodes McGoodwin
- Architectural style: Shingle Style, Romanesque, Picturesque Eclectic
- NRHP reference No.: 79002318
- Added to NRHP: December 11, 1979

Druim Moir, also known as the Houston Estate Historic District, is a historic district in the Chestnut Hill neighborhood of Philadelphia, Pennsylvania.

Druim Moir was added to the National Register of Historic Places in 1979. It is a contributing property of the Chestnut Hill National Historic District.

"Druim Moir" means Great Ridge in Scottish Gaelic.

== Contributing properties ==
The centerpiece of the historic district is Druim Moir Castle (1885–86), whose main gate is at the corner of Willow Grove Avenue and Cherokee Street. Designed by architects G. W. & W. D. Hewitt, and built at a cost of over $115,000 for Henry H. Houston, the thirty-room home was the largest in its neighborhood.

Local Wissahickon schist was used for the walls, Eastern granite for the trim, and slate for the roof. The interior is notable for its variety of woods: oak for the hall and stairway, butternut walnut for the parlor, mahogany for the reception room, quartered oak in the dining room and library, sycamore for the office, and cypress for the servant's section. Oak, cherry, and sycamore were used on the second floor, and white pine for the third-floor servants' quarters.

Houston was the largest landowner in Philadelphia in the 1880s. He earned his wealth as the freight manager of the Pennsylvania Railroad, as well as from gold mining, shipping, and petroleum products. Houston also developed the neighborhood of over 80 homes known as Wissahickon Heights that surrounds Druim Moir.

Nearby Brinkwood, a Shingle-style residence, was a wedding present from Houston to his son, Samuel F. Houston, in 1887.

The gardens were altered in 1920-1921 by Robert Rodes McGoodwin for Samuel F. Houston. In 1952, the house was modified by the removal of the top story and towers.

In addition to the eponymous castle and Brinkwood, the historic district comprises five other contributing properties and eight non-contributing properties.

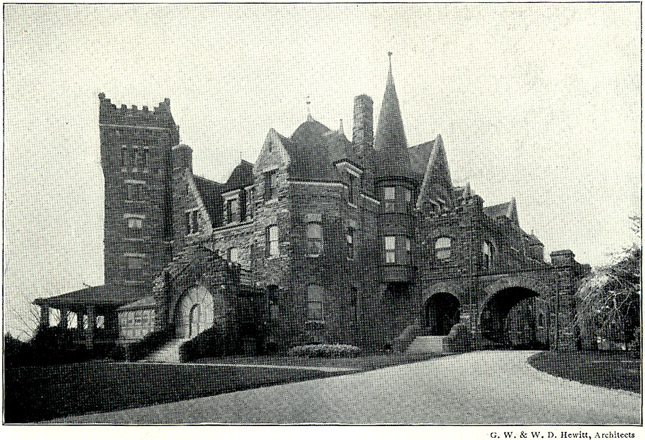
Druim Moir in 1901

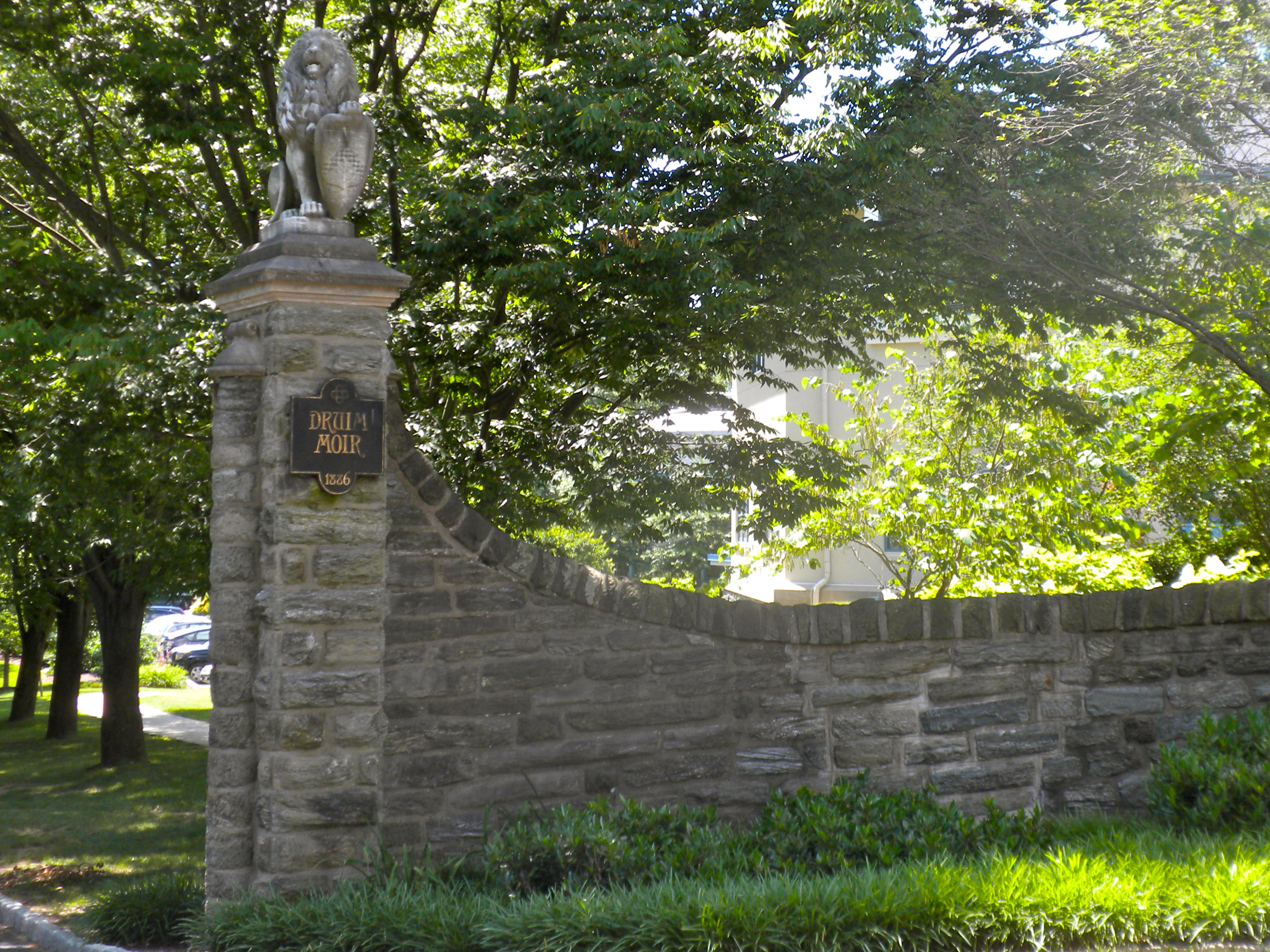
Gateway to Druim Moir, built before 1904
