= St. John's Episcopal Church and Burying Ground =

Historic church in New Jersey, United States

- U.S. National Register of Historic Places
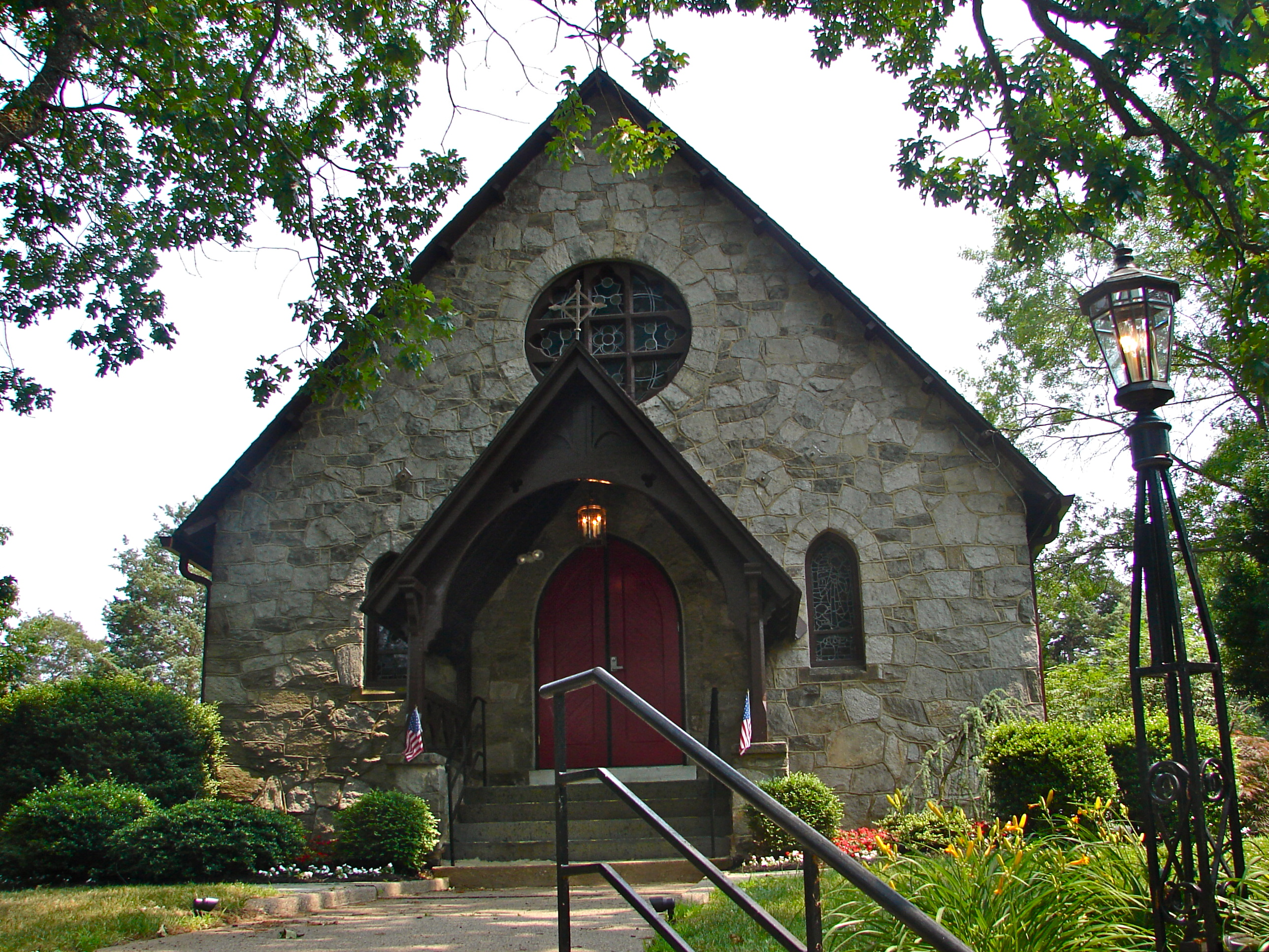

- Location within Camden County, New Jersey Location within New Jersey Location within the United States
- Nearest city: Runnemede, New Jersey
- Coordinates: 39°49′56″N 75°3′48″W
- Area: 1.8 acres (0.73 ha)
- Built: 1880-81
- Architect: Hewitt, George Watson
- Architectural style: Gothic
- NRHP reference No.: 80002475
- Added to NRHP: November 22, 1980

St. John's Episcopal Church and Burying Ground is a historic church in Chews Landing, Camden County, New Jersey, United States. The congregation was founded in 1789 and the current church building was designed by George Watson Hewitt and consecrated by the Rt. Rev. John Scarborough on November 9, 1881.

The church and burying ground were added to the National Register of Historic Places in 1980.

== History ==
An extant record shows that an organizing meeting was held on November 14, 1789, and St. John's Church was officially established as part of the Protestant Episcopal Church of the United States of America. Available records also include a list of early contributors. A red cedar church was built in August, 1790. Local Revolutionary War hero Aaron Chew raised funds locally and from other soldiers from the war, including George Washington, James Madison, three signers of the Declaration of Independence, Frederick Muhlenberg, the first Speaker of the House of Representatives, a future Director of the U.S. Mint, several early state governors and U.S. congressmen.

== See also ==
- National Register of Historic Places listings in Camden County, New Jersey
