= Henry H. Houston =

American businessman

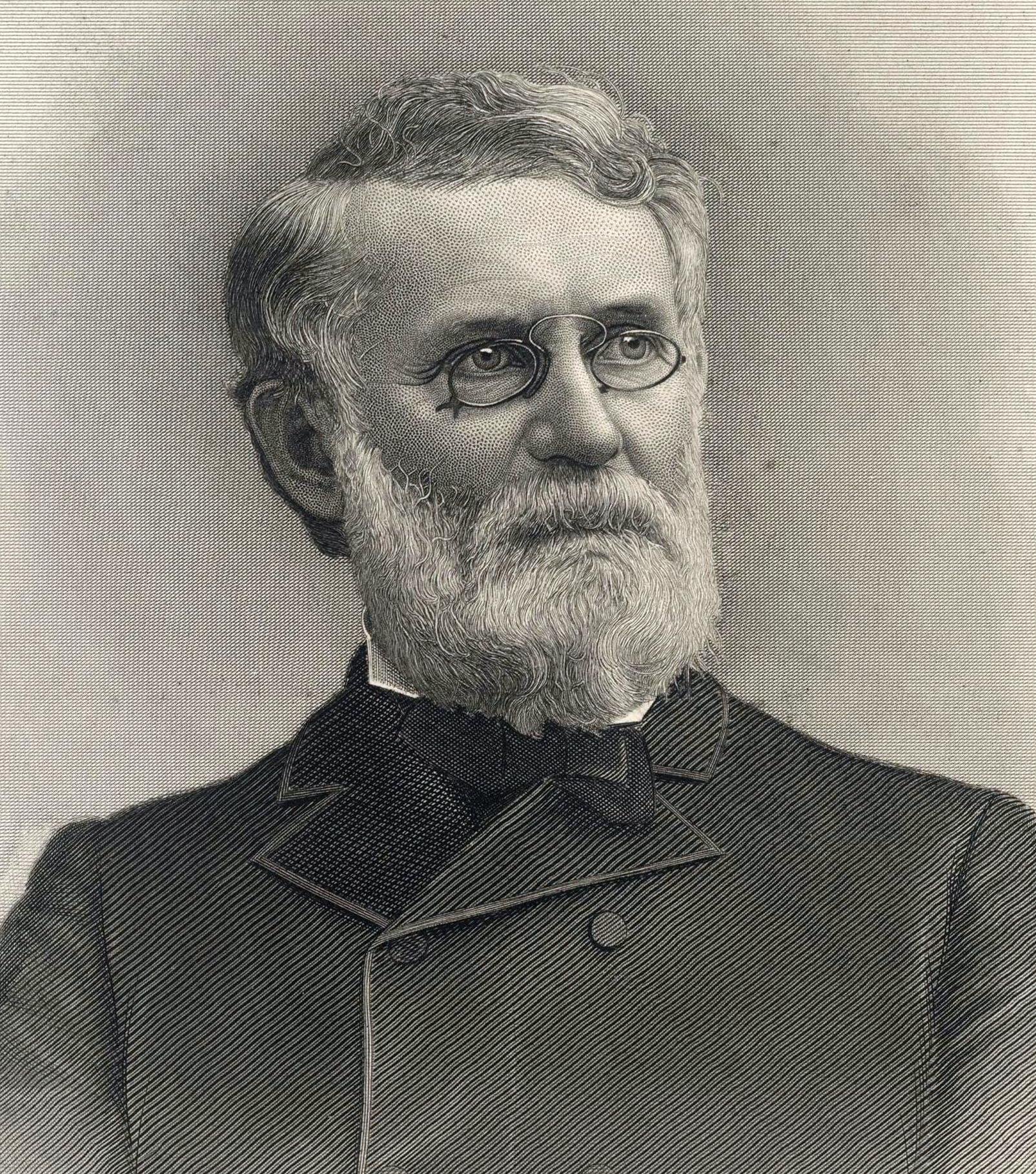
- Born: October 3, 1820; Near Wrightsville, Pennsylvania, U.S.
- Died: June 21, 1895 (aged 74)
- Occupations: Railroad executive, investor in oil and precious metals, developer
- Known for: Railroad businessman and philanthropist
- Spouse: Sarah S. Bonnell
- Relatives: Sam Houston (grand nephew) (Note: Sam Houston was Dr. John Houston's great grandson.)

Henry H. Houston (October 3, 1820 – June 21, 1895) was a leading Philadelphia businessman and philanthropist. He worked in iron and transportation industries and invested in oil and precious metal concerns. He sat on boards of a number of railroad organizations and he was trustee of the University of Pennsylvania and Washington and Lee University. He developed Wissahickon Heights, an exclusive community in western Chestnut Hill.

== Early life ==
Henry Howard Houston was born on the Houston farm near Wrightsville, Pennsylvania on October 3, 1820, the son of Susan (Strickler) and Samuel Nelson Houston. He had an older brother and three younger sisters. During his childhood, he also grew up in Columbia, Pennsylvania. He was of Scottish-Irish heritage, his ancestors immigrated to Colonial America in the early 18th century.

== Career ==
When Houston was 14, he became a clerk at John S. Futhey's mercantile house in Wrightsville, which supplied construction materials for a tow bridge, Susquehanna River dam, Tide-Water Canal, and Baltimore and Susquehanna Railroad. He worked at the job for five years. Houston began his adult career working in the iron furnace industry in Clarion County and Venango Counties. In 1847, he worked for D. Leech and Company, a canal and railroad transportation firm.

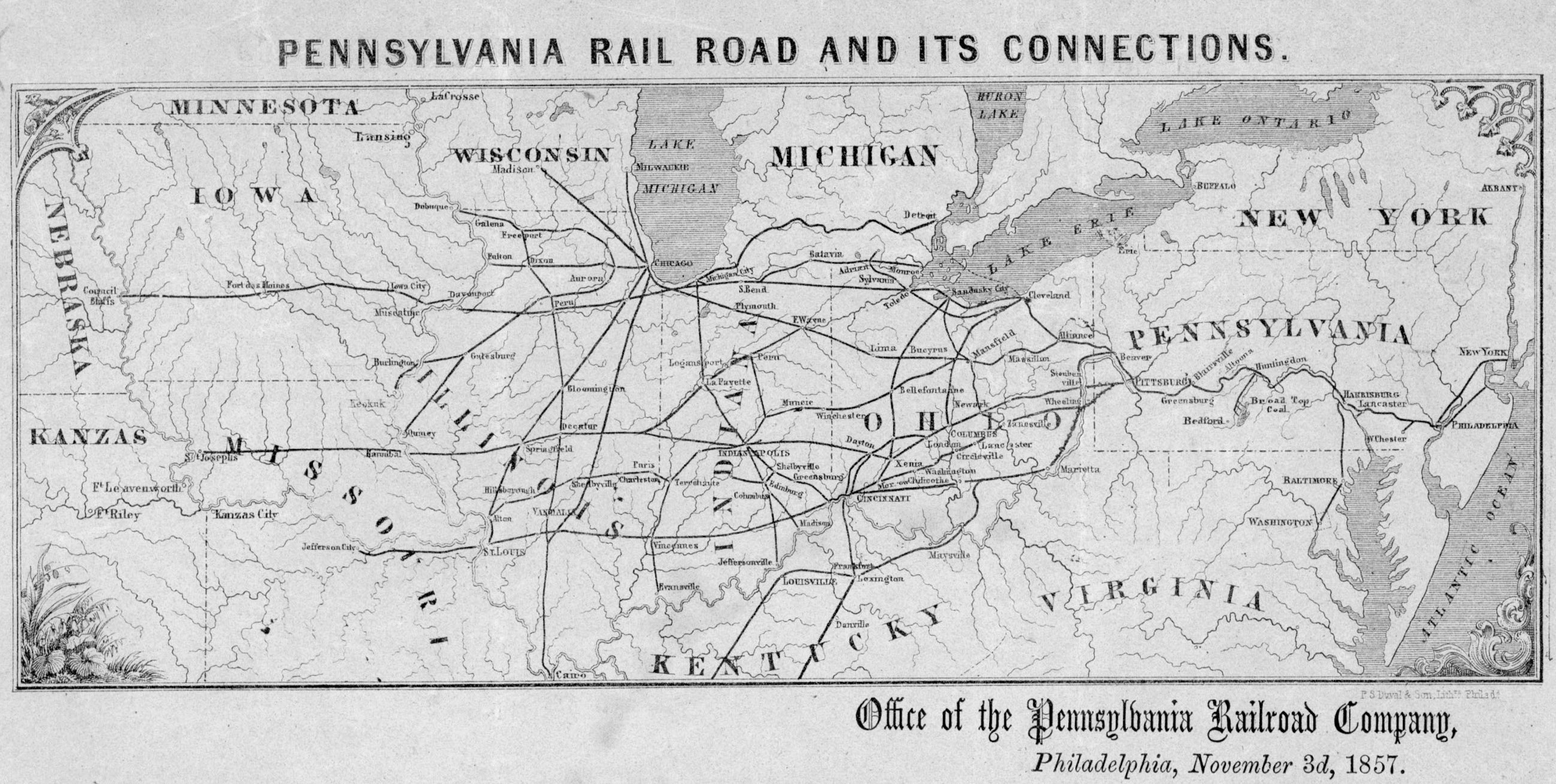
An 1857 map of the Pennsylvania Railroad and its connections

Col. William C. Patterson, president of the Pennsylvania Railroad, hired Houston to establish and operate the company's freight business from 1851, and he became the General Freight Manager in 1852. He resigned in 1867 due to poor health and worked as promoter and manager of the Union and Erie Lines. Houston was in charge of the Philadelphia, Germantown and Chestnut Hill Railroad, now SEPTA's Regional Rail Chestnut Hill West Line, which was built in the 1880s to link downtown Philadelphia with the wealthy and growing suburbs to the northwest.

Houston was among the early investors in the oil industry in Pennsylvania. He invested in silver and gold mines in Colorado and Montana. He was part-owner of 21 ocean vessels and 20 steamers on lakes. He was president of The Pacific Mail Steam Ship Company. Houston invested in coal mines in West Virginia and Pennsylvania.

Houston accumulated wealth during the American Civil War, when the Pennsylvania Railroad supplied supplies and troops for the Union Army. After the war, he benefited from the efficiency and success of his transcontinental freight lines. He acquired most of his wealth from his investments in the Atlantic Refining Company.

He was a trustee of the University of Pennsylvania and Washington and Lee University. He sat on the board of directors of the International Navigation Company, the Pittsburgh, Cincinnati, Chicago and St. Louis Railroad, the Cumberland Valley Railroad, the Pennsylvania Steel Company, the Erie and Western Transportation Company. He was elected as a member to the American Philosophical Society in 1887.

He was the developer of Wissahickon Heights (now St. Martins area), an exclusive community in western Chestnut Hill, and built the original structures used by Chestnut Hill Academy and the Philadelphia Cricket Club. Houston owned the Wissahickon Inn.

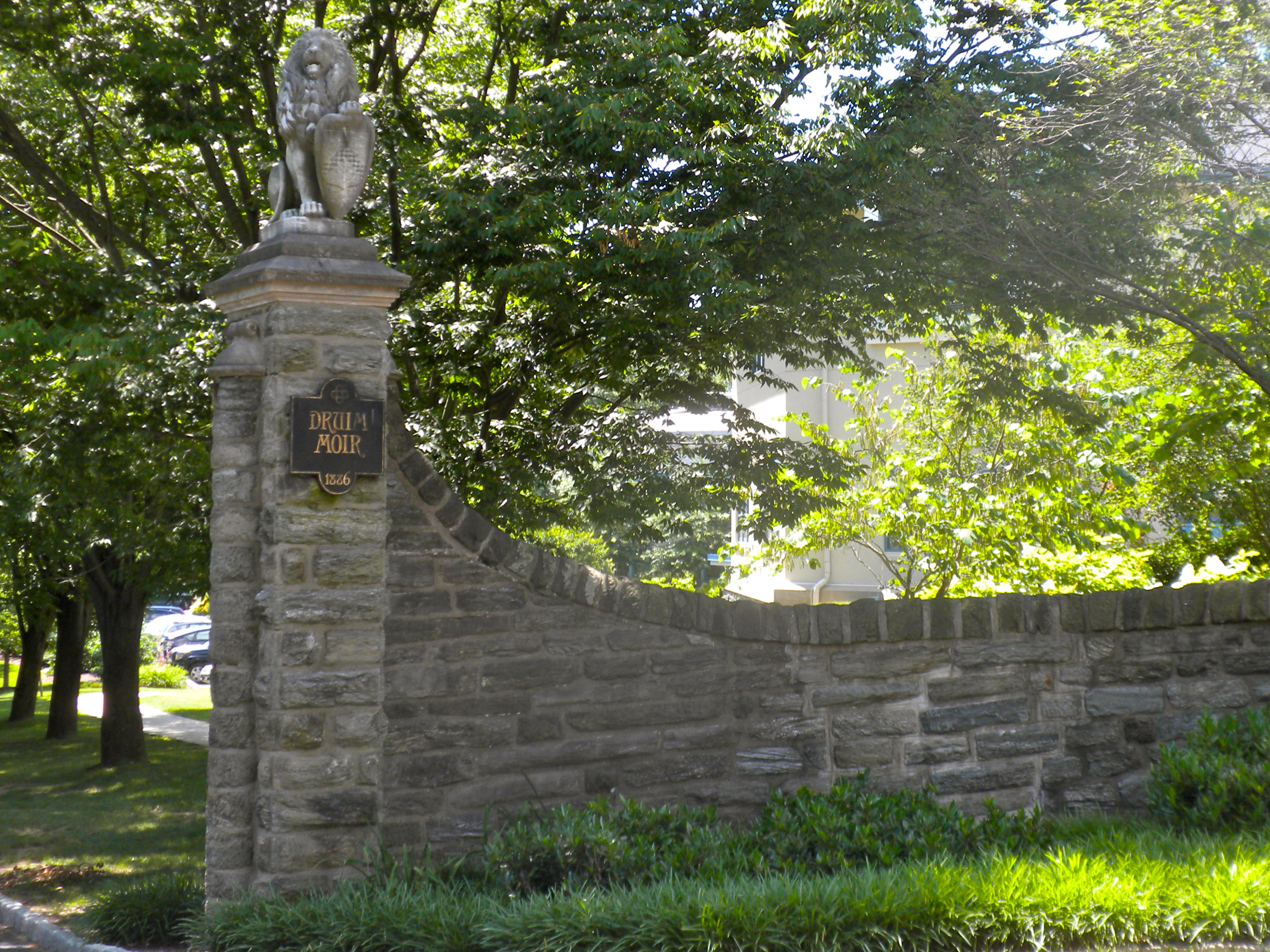
Gateway to Druim Moir

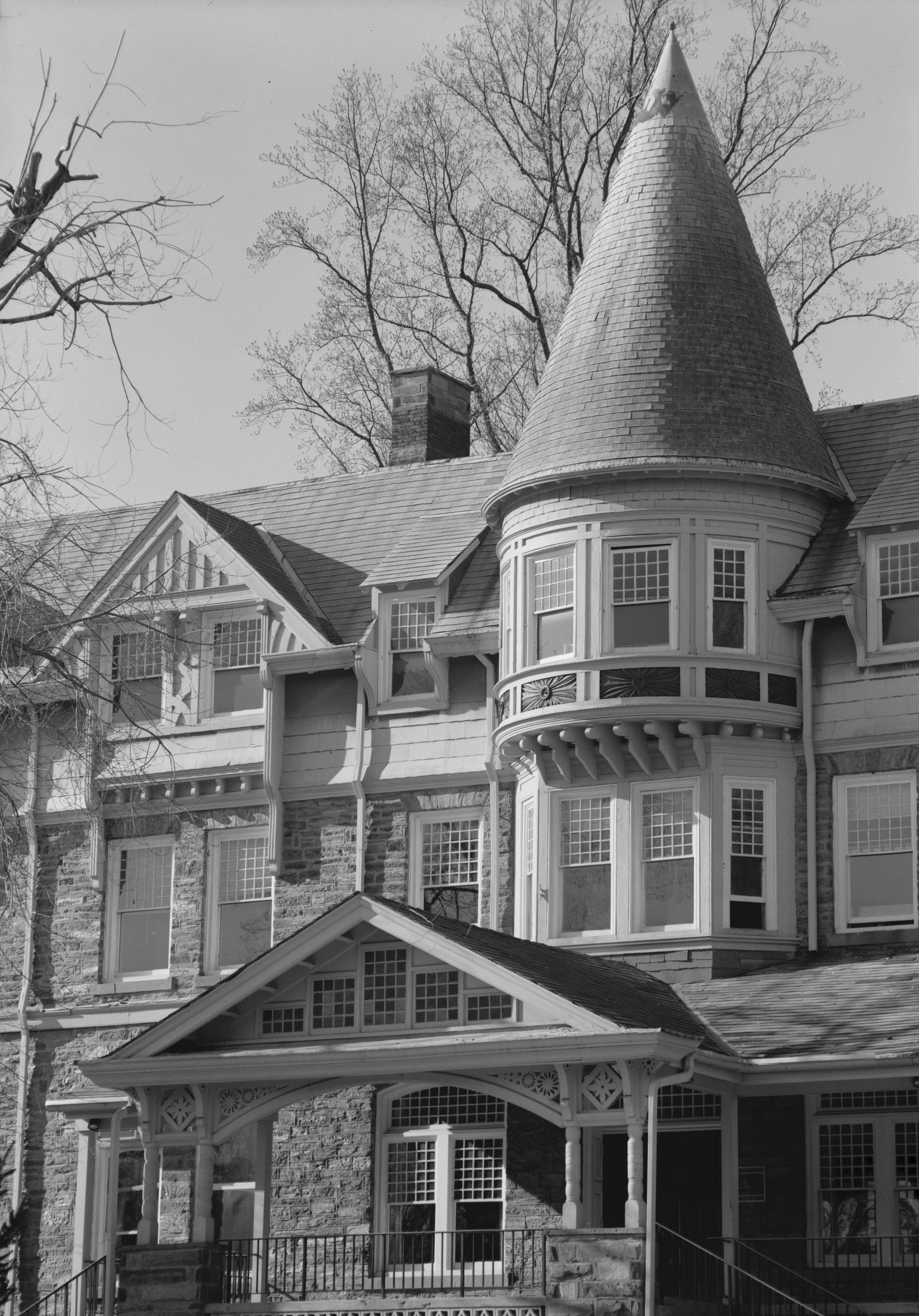
Wissahickon Inn (now Chestnut Hill Academy)

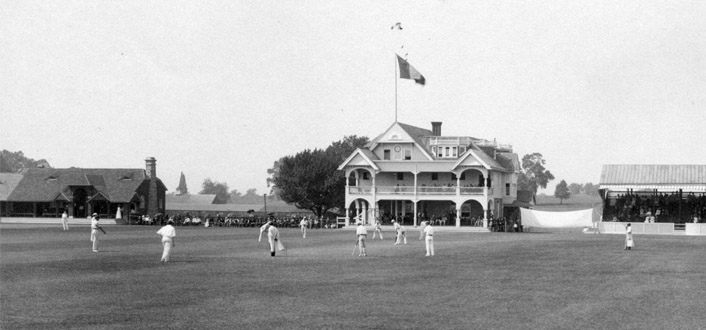
Philadelphia Cricket Club, original building, burned 1909

== Marriage and children ==
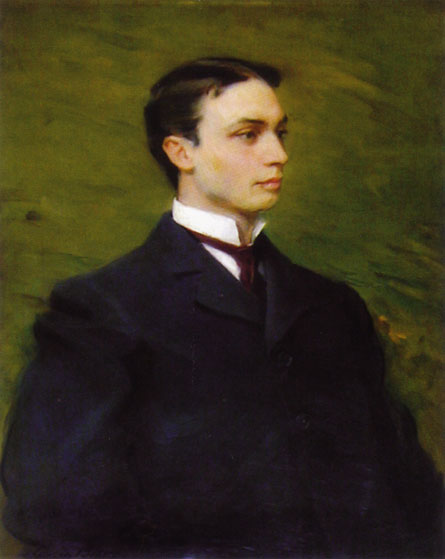
Henry Howard Houston Jr, 1895, by Cecilia Beaux

Houston married Sarah (Sallie) S. Bonnell in 1856, and they had six children, only three of whom survived him, Sallie Bonnell Houston, Samuel Frederic Houston, and Gertrude Houston Woodward. Henry Houston Jr. died in June 1879 in Rome while on a post-graduate tour of Europe. Two of the children's names are unknown.

Houston attended St. Peter's Church in the Germantown neighborhood of Philadelphia.

== Philanthropy ==
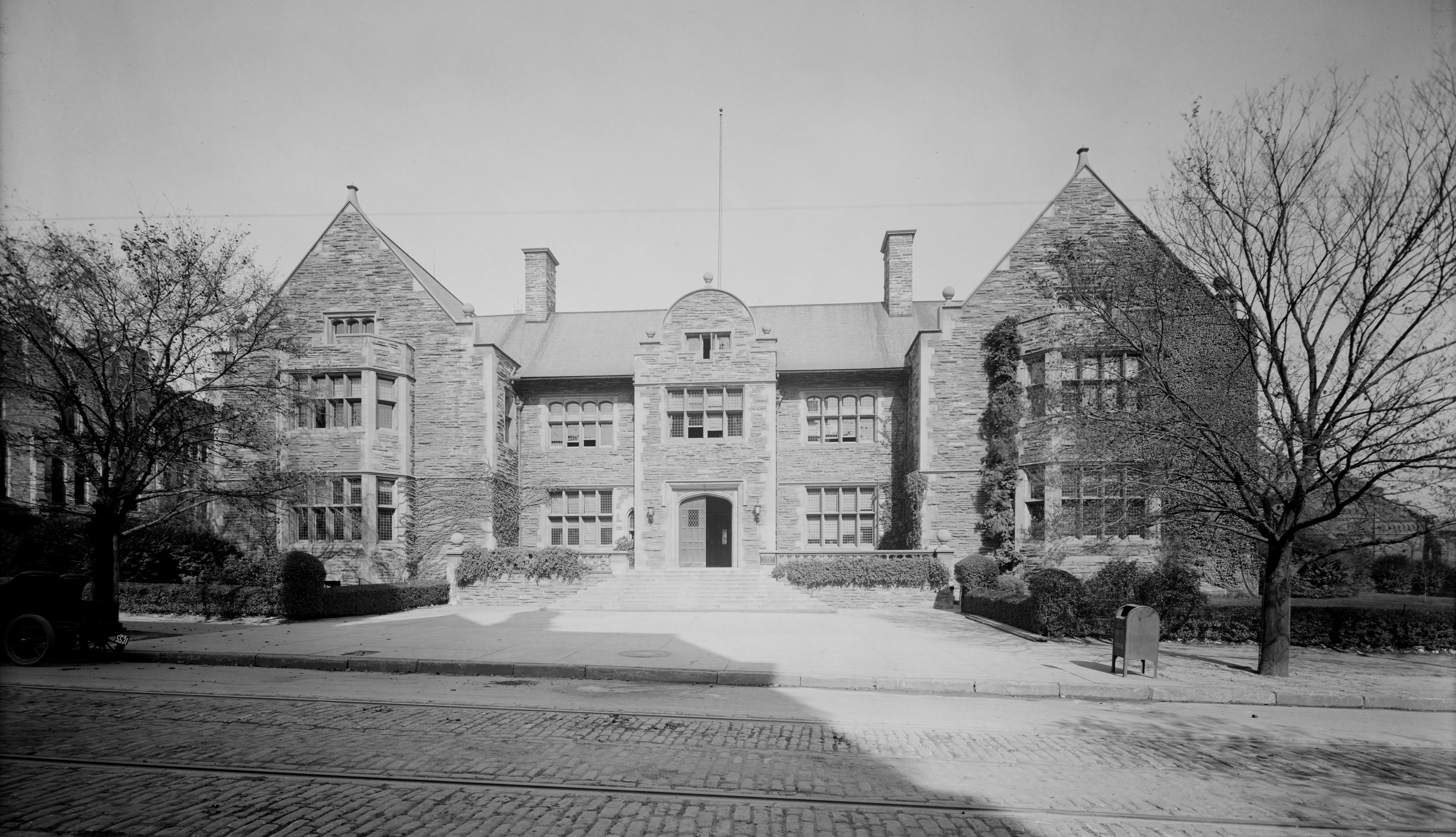
Houston Hall, University of Pennsylvania

Houston was known for his generosity and charitable acts. He gave $500,000 (equivalent to $19,350,000 in 2025) to the University of Pennsylvania. He donated $100,000 for the construction of Houston Hall, a recreation hall for students, as a memorial to his son Henry H. Houston, Jr., who died while traveling in Europe after his college graduation. Houston was also a benefactor of Washington and Lee University and the Protestant Episcopal Church of St. Martin's-in-the-Fields. Often, he preferred his philanthropic activities to remain unknown.

== Death and estate ==
Houston died on June 21, 1895, at his country house in Wissahickon, Philadelphia. Houston's 1895 will was still contested until 1964, by that time the property he left in trust was worth approximately $145 million, leading to a decision by the Pennsylvania Supreme Court. The case is often taught in law school in property and probate law courses as it deals with the interpretation of future interests created in favor of Houston's grandchildren.

== Legacy ==
A statue at the Wissahickon Valley Park memorializes Houston's role as real estate developer, railroad magnate, and philanthropist. The statue, depicting Houston in top hat and tails and his Irish Wolfhound, is located at the southeast corner of Lincoln Drive and Harvey Street. John Massey Rhind, a Scottish-American sculptor, made the work of art for the City of Philadelphia Fairmount Park Commission that was installed in 1900.

Houston's Chestnut Hill mansion, Druim Moir (1886), still exists, having been converted to multiple residential units in 1980. Springside School occupies part of the former estate's grounds.

Houston is the namesake of the Henry H. Houston Elementary School in Mount Airy, Philadelphia, Pennsylvania.
