= Freeport Main Street Historic District =

Historic district in Maine, United States

- U.S. National Register of Historic Places
- U.S. Historic district
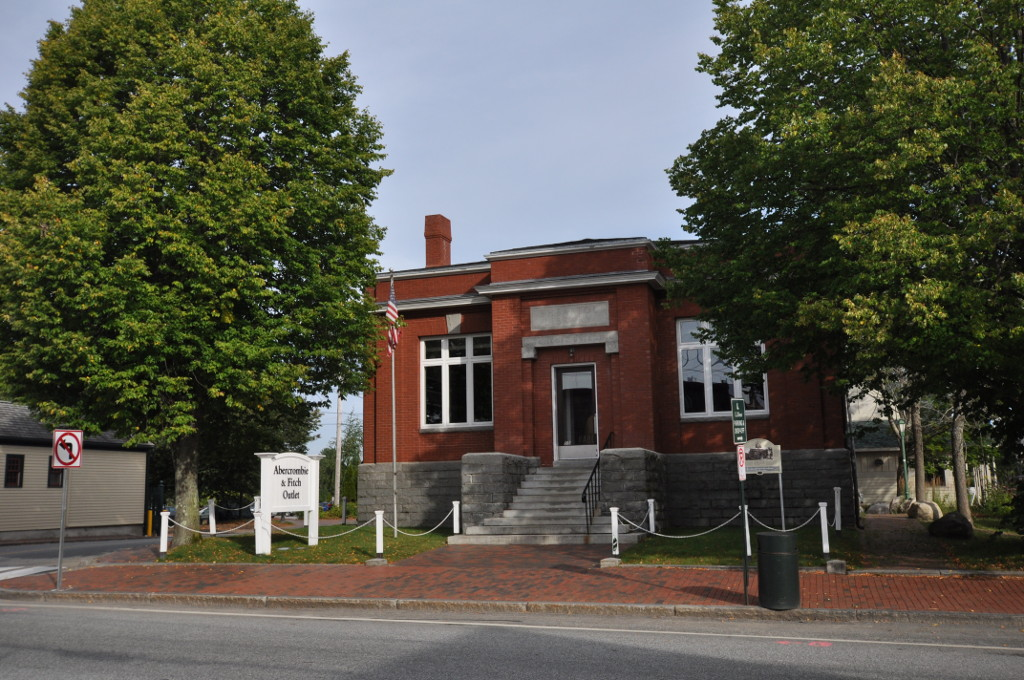
- The former B. H. Bartol Library, housing an Abercrombie and Fitch outlet in 2014

- Location within Maine Location within the United States
- Location: Main St., Freeport, Maine
- Coordinates: 43.8562°N 70.10468°W
- Area: 3.5 acres (1.4 ha)
- Architectural style: Colonial Revival, Federal, Shingle Style
- NRHP reference No.: 77000064
- Added to NRHP: November 16, 1977

The Freeport Main Street Historic District encompasses a 1-2 block area of Main Street (U.S. Route 1) in Freeport, Maine. It extends from Grove and Holbrook Streets in the south to Mill and Nathan Nye Streets in the north, just south of the L. L. Bean complex. The district, listed on the National Register of Historic Places in 1977, encompasses a well-preserved remnant of Freeport's 19th century town center.

== Description ==
There are nine buildings in the district, dating principally to the 19th century, most of which are former residences, well-preserved despite their adaptation to retail purposes. The oldest building in the district is the Mitchell-Soule-Davis House (49 Main), a 1 1/2-story Federal Cape built c. 1790. One of the more impressive houses is the c. 1830 Harrington House (45 Main), a transitional Federal-Greek Revival brick house which is now home to the Freeport Historical Society. The Gould House (35 Main) was the most recent of the nine to be built; it was a Colonial Revival wood-frame structure built in 1922. It was razed and a modern retail building was constructed in 2015.

There are two prominent public (or formerly public) buildings in the district. The Congregational Church (38 Main) was built in 1895 to a design by Will S. Aldrich, is a Shingle style wood-frame structure built on the site of an earlier church. The former B. H. Bartol library stands at 55 Main Street, and was built with funding assistance from Andrew Carnegie; it has, like most of the houses, been converted to retail use.

Freeport's 19th-century center differs from its earlier colonial centers, the areas of Mast Landing, Porter Landing, and South Freeport, which are part of the Harraseeket Historic District, and are located on the banks of the Harraseeket River. By the late 18th century, this area of Main Street had started to become economically significant as a stop on the stage route between Portland and Brunswick, and its economic significance was cemented in the late 19th century, when industrial activity eclipsed maritime pursuits in the local economy.

== See also ==
- National Register of Historic Places listings in Cumberland County, Maine
