= Crab Island, Freeport, Maine =

Island in Freeport, Maine, United States

Coordinates: 43°47′44″N 70°05′42″W

Crab Island is a small, privately owned Casco Bay island that is one of 18 islands within the boundaries of the town of Freeport, Maine. Crab Island is notable for having been once owned by Arctic explorer Robert Peary.

== Geography ==
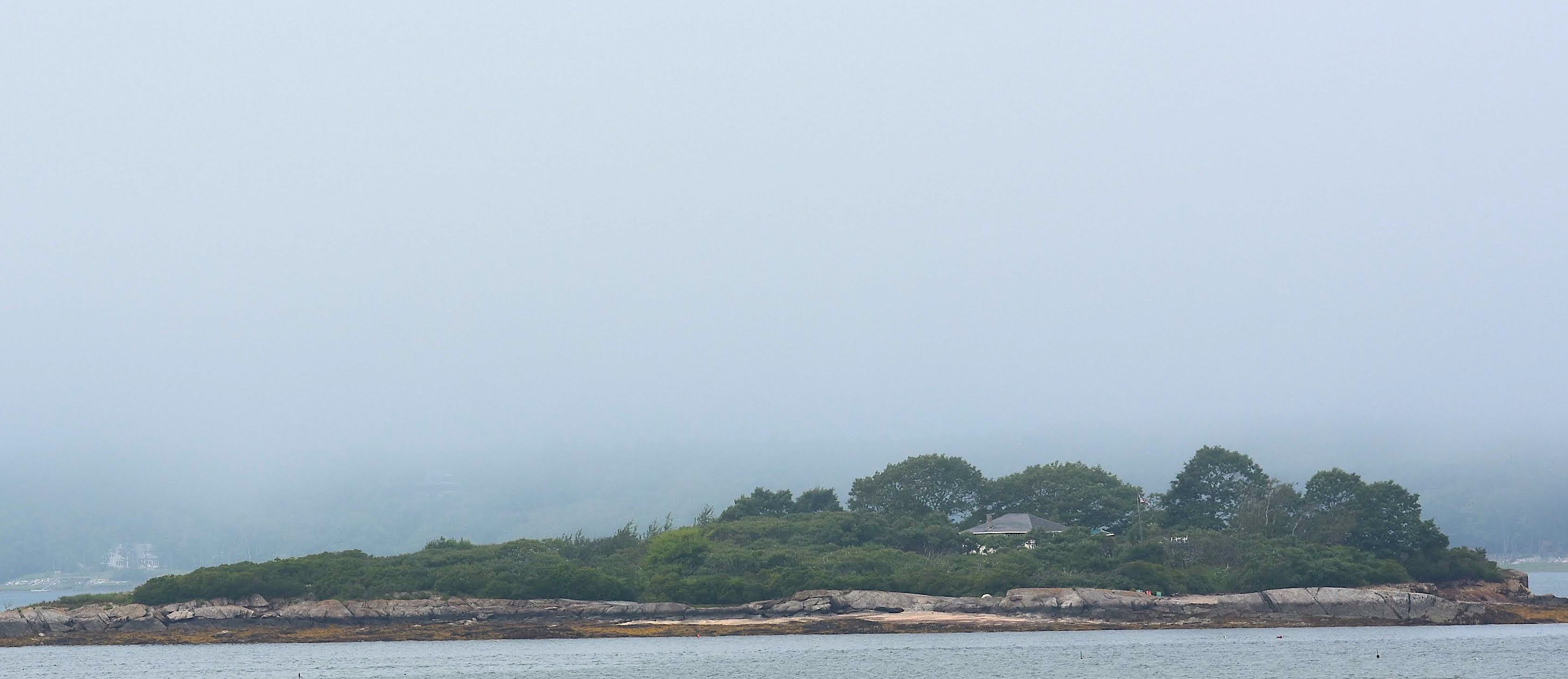
Crab Island in Casco Bay, once owned by Arctic explorer Robert Peary.

Crab Island is located off the Harraseeket River estuary in Freeport, west of Bustins Island and north of Mosier Island. A deep channel approaches the Harraseeket to the east of the island, with shallower waters to the west and exposed mudflats at low tides in some areas.

Crab Island totals one acre of land. The name of the island is thought to be derived from its shape suggesting the form of a crab at particular tides.

== History ==
Crab Island was included under the municipal jurisdiction of Freeport in 1789 after the town was incorporated separately from North Yarmouth. A house that had been built in the 1870s by a family living on the island.

Crab Island was one of several in Casco Bay that came to be owned by Robert Peary, starting with his $500 purchase of Eagle Island at the southern tip of Harpswell Neck, after graduating in 1877 from Bowdoin College. Peary would later build a house on Eagle Island that today is the Eagle Island State Historic Site.

Peary purchased Crab Island in 1907 for $800 and gave use of the island to his daughter, author Marie Peary Kuhne.

Crab Island was sold in the 1950s for $50,000, with the new owners building a small bungalow on Crab Island in 1960. New owners purchased Crab Island in 2018 for $895,000.

The town of Freeport includes Crab Island as part of an "Island District" that restricts uses and development to minimize the disturbance of wildlife habitats and pollution, and to preserve the natural appearance of landscapes.

The state of Maine has awarded multiple aquaculture leases in the immediate vicinity of Crab Island for the suspended cultivation of oysters and sugar kelp.
