= Pote (disambiguation) =

Poté is a municipality of Minas Gerais, Brazil.

Pote or Poté may also refer to:

- Pedro Gonçalves (born 1998), full name Pedro António Pereira Gonçalves and known as Pote, Portuguese football midfielder

== Surname ==
People with the surname Pote or Poté include:

- Lou Pote (born 1971), American baseball pitcher
- Michael Pote (born 1989), South African cricketer
- Mickaël Poté (born 1984), Beninese football forward
- Pravin Pote, Indian politician from Maharashtra
- Romain Poté (1935–2010), Belgian sprinter
- William Pote (1718 – c. 1755), British surveyor and ship captain

== Given name ==
People with the given name Pote include:

- Pote Sarasin (1905–2000), Thai diplomat and politician
- Pote Human (born 1959), real name Gerhard Human, South African rugby union player and coach
- Pote, fictional villain in the 1998 Indian film Gunda, played by Mohan Joshi

== See also ==
- Capt. Greenfield Pote House, historic house located in Freeport, Maine, United States
- Phot (given name)
