= Archie Ross =

American sea captain (1924–2002)

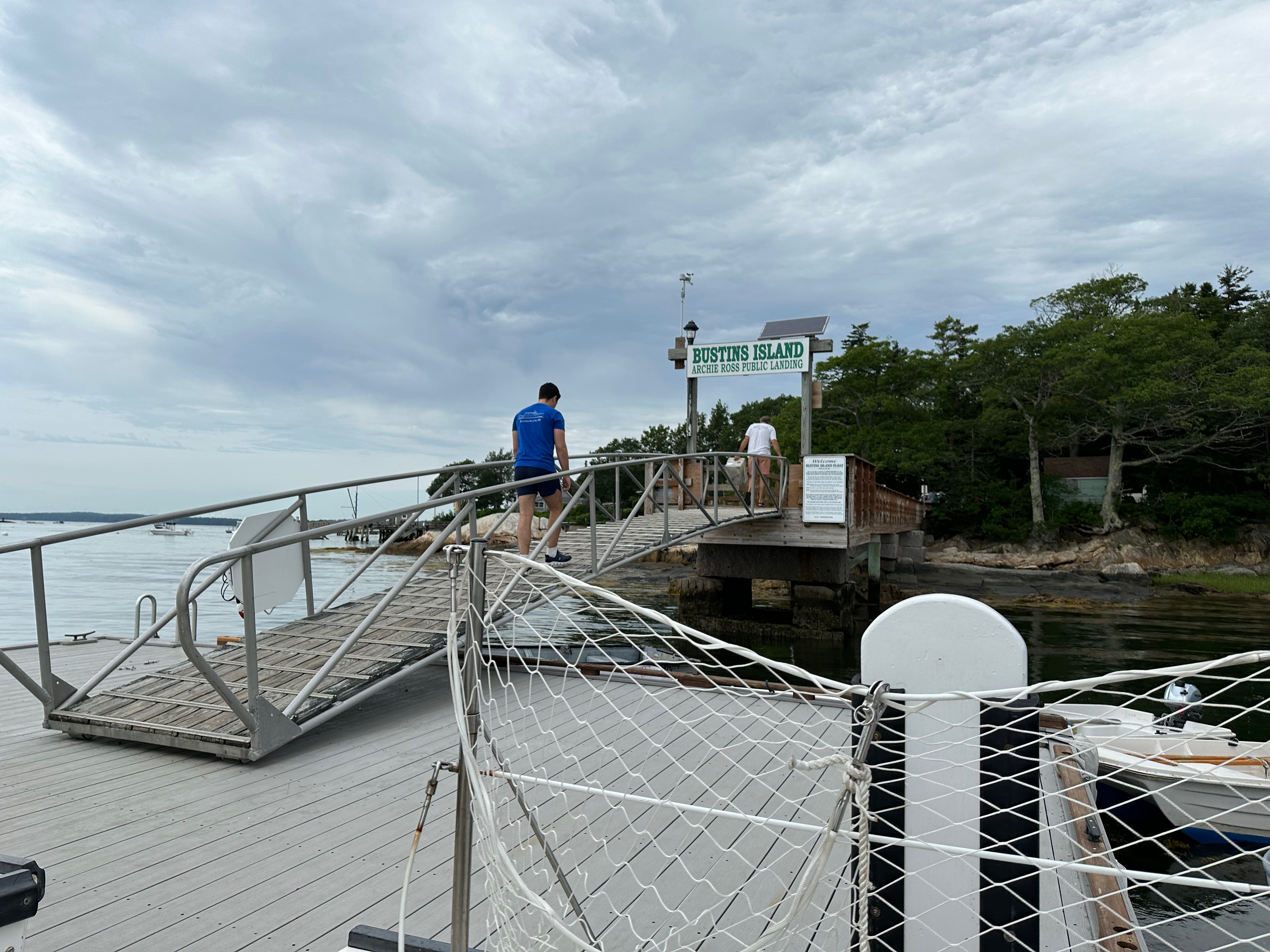
- The Bustins Island Archie Ross Public Landing (2023)
- Born: March 8, 1924; Massachusetts, U.S.
- Died: February 24, 2002 (aged 77); Yarmouth, Maine, U.S.
- Resting place: Chebeague Island Cemetery, Chebeague Island, Maine, U.S.
- Occupation: Sea captain

Archie Elbert Ross (March 8, 1924 – February 24, 2002) was an American sea captain and shipwright. He was captain of the ferry which runs between Bustins Island and South Freeport, Maine, for over fifty years. Bustins Island's public landing is now named for him.

== Life and career ==
Ross was born in Massachusetts in 1924 to Eli Freeman Ross and Marie Lavinia Hatfield. He was raised on Chebeague Island, Maine, which was then part of Cumberland. He began his working life, until the outbreak of World War II, as a deckhand aboard the ferry Nellie G, which ran between Falmouth Foreside and Cousins Island, Littlejohn Island and Chebeague Island during the high seasons. During the war, he captained boats for Captain William V. Benson from Portland to the military installations in Casco Bay.

After the war's conclusion, he obtained a ship master's license, which was a requirement for captains of passenger boats. He returned to working aboard the Nellie G, then the Nellie G III and, finally, the Victory. He purchased the latter vessel from the Swett family and began captaining the Bustins Island ferry, which is the Lilly B as of 2023, for fifty years (1946 to 1996). He was also the island's mail carrier until 1997.

The Victory was shipwrecked while attempting to rescue another vessel caught in a storm in 1949. The residents of Bustins Island raised funds for a replacement ferry, which he named the Marie L, after his mother.

During winters, he enlisted as a merchant marine. He also worked on the old Portland Pilot boat until 1963, as well as building wooden boats as part-owner (with Carroll Lowell) of Even Keel Boatyard in Yarmouth, Maine. Their last vessel was the Calliope in 1989.

On July 20, 1996, the United States Postal Service honored Ross with a special cancellation. A year earlier, the United States Coast Guard honored him for his safety record.

Upon his retirement in 1996, he returned to Chebeague Island, where he and his wife, Claire, lived for the rest of his life.

== Death ==
Ross died in 2002, aged 77, after a long illness. He was interred in Chebeague Island Cemetery alongside his parents.

=== Legacy ===
In 2022, to mark the 25th anniversary of Ross's retirement, Bustins Island dedicated its public landing in his honor.
