= Casco Castle =

Resort in South Freeport, Maine, United States (1903–1914)

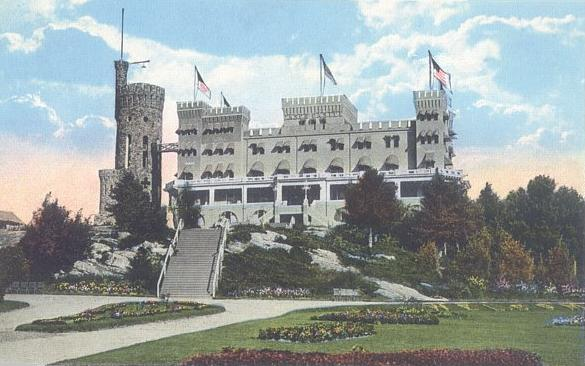
- The front of the castle in a 1906 postcard, viewed from Castle Road, looking southeast
- Interactive map of the Casco Castle area

General information
- Location: South Freeport, Maine, U.S., Castle Road
- Coordinates: 43.81877°N 70.11173°W
- Completed: 1903
- Demolished: 1914 (112 years ago)
- Owner: Amos F. Gerald

Technical details
- Floor count: 5

Design and construction
- Architect: William R. Miller

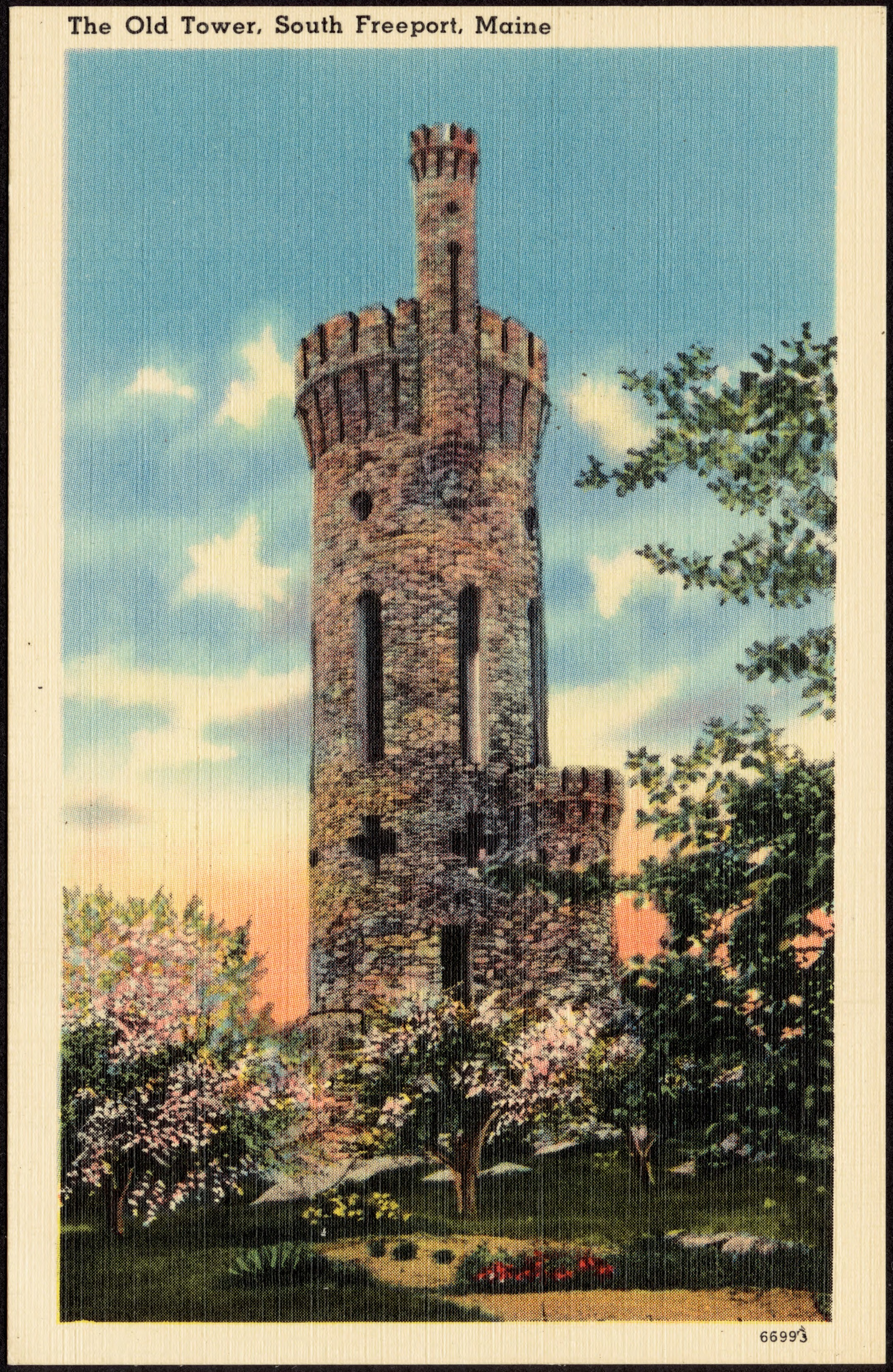
The hotel's stone tower, which is still standing today, viewed from the north

Casco Castle was a resort in South Freeport, Maine, United States. Built in 1903, it was intended to resemble a castle. Designed by William R. Miller and overlooking Casco Bay immediately to its east, it burned down in 1914. All that now remains is its 185-foot (56 m) tall stone tower, which is now on private property, inaccessible to the public. The tower can be viewed from Harraseeket Road, a few yards closer to the shoreline, or from Winslow Memorial Park, directly to the south across the Harraseeket River. The main part of the building was to the south, with the tower on its northern side, connected by a bridge.

In 1903, Amos F. Gerald, of Fairfield, Maine, built the castle as a resort, with rooms for around one hundred guests, to encourage travel by trolleycars. It was his second attempt; the first, Merrymeeting Park, in Brunswick, Maine, was a failure. The grounds featured a hotel and restaurant, a picnic area, a baseball field, and a small zoo. The hotel burned in 1914, but its stone tower was spared. It stands today on private property.

Trolleycars of the Portland & Brunswick Street Railway, of which Gerald was general manager, brought visitors from nearby Freeport. After alighting, they crossed 70 foot (21 m) above Spark Creek on a steel suspension bridge, then climbed steep steps to the hotel's entrance.

Casco Castle Park was served by the Harpswell Steamboat Company, whose steamers stopped in South Freeport en route to and from Portland and Harpswell Center.

The advent of the automobile contributed to the decline of trolley and steamer travel, and the resort closed in 1914 after an eleven-year run. It reopened the same year with new owners, but a fire broke out and destroyed the hotel. The stone tower survived.

A photomechanical print of Casco Castle is in the archives of the Metropolitan Museum of Art in New York City.

The trolleycar Camilla, of the Portland & Brunswick Street Railway, pictured at the castle's bridge during the winter of 1903 and 1904

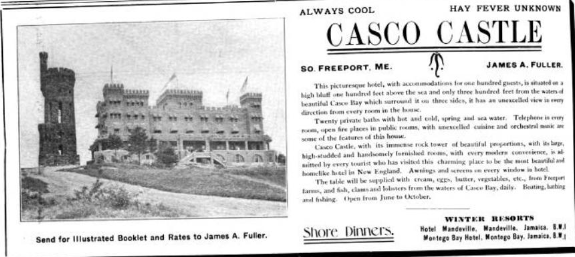
A 1906 advertisement for the castle in the Board of Trade Journal

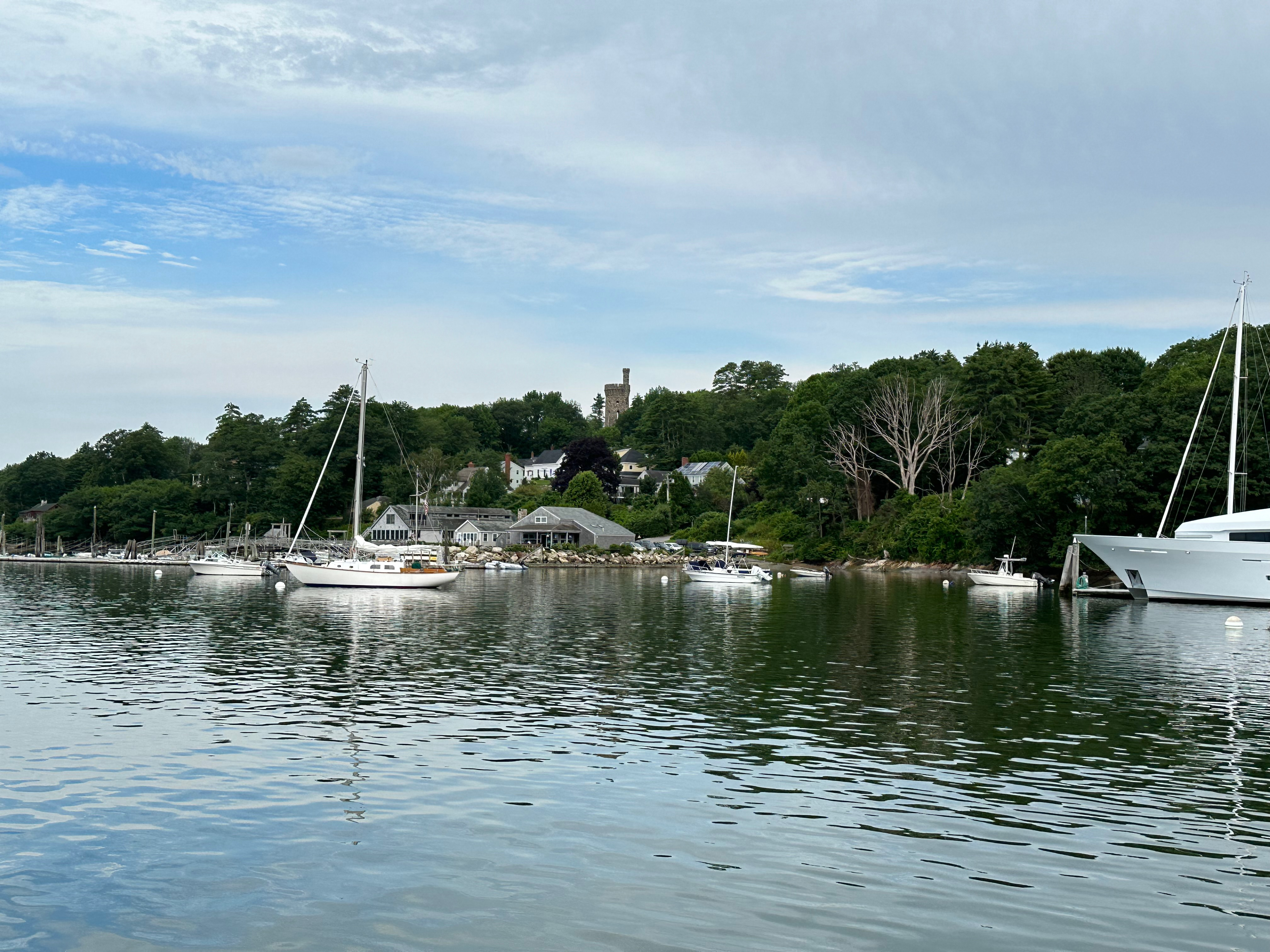
The castle's tower in 2023, viewed from Casco Bay

== Design and construction ==
The builder of the all-wood hotel was Benjamin Franklin Dunning. He used gray shingles to make the exterior look like stone. A bridge connected the main building to the stone tower.

The designer of the property's gardens was John J. Turner.
