= Benjamin Franklin Dunning =

19th and 20th century American builder

- Dunning, pictured around 1920
- Born: June 7, 1856; Lisbon, Maine, U.S.
- Died: June 4, 1940 (aged 83); Danvers, Massachusetts, U.S.
- Notable work: Casco Castle

Benjamin Franklin Dunning (June 7, 1856 – June 4, 1940) was an American builder who was prominent in the 19th and 20th centuries. His most notable work was Casco Castle in Maine.

== Life and career ==
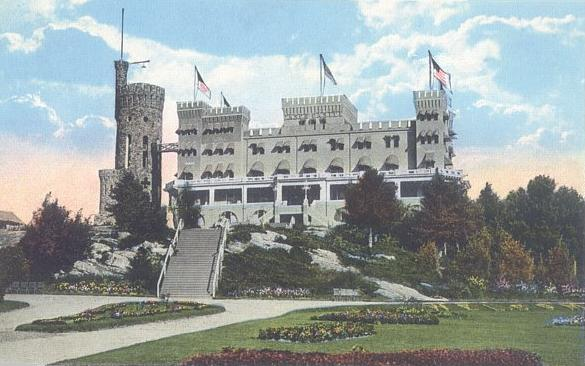
Casco Castle, in South Freeport, Maine, one of Dunning's works

Dunning, known as "Frank" to family and friends, was born on June 7, 1856, in Lisbon, Maine, to Jesse Appleton Dunning and Dorcas Anne Greene.

On August 14, 1880, in Gorham, New Hampshire, he married Adrianne Staples "Addie" Reed, with whom he had seven children, including Thurlow Reed Dunning (born 1897), who was a colonel in the United States Army.

He was the head mason during the construction of Casco Castle, in South Freeport, Maine. It was completed in 1903, but burned down in 1914. Only its stone tower remains.

After living in Freeport, Maine, the family moved to Winchester, Massachusetts, in 1907. Some of the family later returned to Freeport.

=== Death ===
Dunning died on June 4, 1940, in Danvers, Massachusetts. He was 83. He is buried in Freeport's Woodlawn Cemetery, alongside his wife, who died three years earlier.

== Selected notable works ==
- Casco Castle, South Freeport, Maine (1903)
