= Albert Spalding (disambiguation) =

Albert Spalding (1849–1915) was an American pitcher, manager, and business executive. Albert Spalding may also refer to:

- Albert Spalding (violinist) (1888–1953), American violinist and composer

== See also ==
- Al Spalding (naval architect) (1932–2022), American naval architect
- Albert Spaulding (1914–1990), American anthropologist and processual archaeologist
