= Pettengill House and Farm =

Historic house in Maine, United States

- U.S. National Register of Historic Places
- U.S. Historic district – Contributing property
- Pettengill House (pictured in 2019)

- Location within Maine Location within the United States
- Location: Pettengill Road, Freeport, Maine, U.S.
- Coordinates: 43.8489°N 70.0804°W
- Area: 180 acres (73 ha)
- Built: circa 1800
- Architectural style: Saltbox house
- Part of: Harraseeket Historic District (ID74000160)
- NRHP reference No.: 70000041

Significant dates
- Added to NRHP: October 6, 1970
- Designated CP: June 28, 1974

The Pettengill House and Farm (also known as the Rodick Pettengill House and Farm) is a historic conservation property in Freeport, Maine, United States. Now owned by the Freeport Historical Society, this farm was in active use from at least 1831 until 1960. More than 140 acres (57 ha) of its original 180 acres (73 ha) have been preserved, as has the c. 1800 saltbox farmhouse. The property was listed on the National Register of Historic Places in 1970, and is part of the 1974 Harraseeket Historic District. The farm is located at the southern end of Pettengill Road in Freeport's Mast Landing area. (The name is erroneously spelled Pettengil on the street sign and, subsequently, on some maps.) The house faces south, looking down the Harraseeket River. The property's trails are open to the public daily from dawn to dusk.

== Location ==
The Pettengill Farm occupies a significant portion of land at the head of the Harraseeket River, a tidal inlet that extends southwest to Casco Bay. The farm property is bounded on the south and west by the river, the north by Flying Point Road, and the east by Kelsey Brook, which empties into the river near the point where it opens into the wide channel. The farmstead is located on a terrace overlooking a bend in the narrow portion of the river, near the southern end of the property, and is about a 1 mile (1.6 km) walk down the access road from the public trailhead. The property, which is now no longer in agricultural use, has a combination of open fields and woods, with public trails now crossing them.

The house and farm make up an unusually well-preserved 19th-century saltwater farm. The house, which dates to the late 18th or early 19th century, was once part of a larger group of agricultural outbuildings, none of which have survived. The farm was in active use until 1960, and the last of the Pettengills that lived on the farm died in 1981.

== Architectural style of farmhouse ==
The farmhouse is a traditional New England saltbox house. It is a 2 1/2-story wood-frame structure, with an integral leanto section sloping down to the rear. It has a central chimney, its exterior is finished in wooden clapboards, and it rests on a stone foundation.

The main facade faces south toward the river. On the first floor, there is a single sash window to the left of the entrance and two (nearly adjoining) to the right. The windows of the second story match that of the first plus an additional one in line with door below. The door has a four-light transom above it.

The northern (rear) facade has three windows a little off-center to the right.

The western side has one window on the first floor, to the right of a side door. There are two windows on the second floor and one in the attic space.

A bulkhead is located on the eastern side of the house. There are five windows on this side (with one where the door is on the opposite side).

The house has never been modernized, and lacks plumbing, heating (beyond the central chimney), and electricity.

== History ==
Lufkin brothers Aaron and Joseph began buying property on the land in the 1790s. In 1801, around a year after the house was constructed, Joseph sold his interest to his brother. In 1811, Aaron fell into financial difficulty and mortgaged the house to Daniel and Enoch Brewer of Freeport, and the land to David Curtis of Brunswick. Aaron died a year later and the property was sold, at auction, to Curtis, who kept the farm intact.

The house was likely uninhabited from 1812 until 1831, at which point Curtis sold the property to Captain James Rodick, who made some improvements to the house. When Rodick died, in 1848, he left the property to his seven children, each of whom received a small lot and a large lot. Rodick's wife, Patience (b. 1782, d. 1838), died ten years before him. His son, Daniel, inherited the lot that included the house, and in 1861 he sold the house and 35 acres to Daniel Randall who was the owner until his 1866 death.

In 1858, Charles Henry Pettengill, a farmer, former sea captain and store owner who lived at nearby Porters Landing, began purchasing parcels of the land. In 1877, he bought the house from Randall's widow, Rebecca, and eventually merged all of the acreage into one lot of about 120 acres.

The Pettengills' dairy cattle grazed on the marsh grasses until milk distributors deemed that their end product was too salty for consumption.

Pettengill's son, Wallace, and daughter-in-law, Adelaide, lived on the property, where they raised three children — Ethel, Frank and Mildred. Ethel died at age 16 or 17.

After Wallace's death in 1925, the two remaining children, Frank and Mildred, carried on the farm, along with their dog, Trixie. In 1959, they sold the farm, with a lease-back agreement, to Eleanor Houston Smith who, with her husband, Lawrence, founded Wolfe’s Neck Farm. The Smiths were preservationists and, fascinated by the Pettengills' lifestyle, provided life tenancy for them. The Smiths also bought back more of the original acreage that had been part of the farm.

Mildred, the last family member, lived in the house part-time until 1965, five years after the death of her brother. She died sixteen years later, in 1981, at the age of 98.

In 1975, Eleanor Smith conveyed the house and some of the land to the Freeport Historical Society, and on her death in 1987, aged 77, she left the remaining land and the contents of the house to the society.

Freeport Historical Society has conducted eight archaeological surveys at the farm. Results from these surveys indicated that there may have been an earlier, smaller structure on the site of the current house, about one-third of its size. The earlier house may have burned down, as evidenced by charcoal being found in the soil. Clay pipe stems and other artefacts suggested that the original house was built during the late 1600s or, more likely, the 1700s.

A hurricane in 1954 destroyed an adjacent 19th-century barn measuring approximately 40 x 34 feet.

In 2015, destructive beetles were discovered in the walls of the house.

== Gallery ==
The house and farmland viewed from the access road, looking southeast

The rear (northern side) of the house

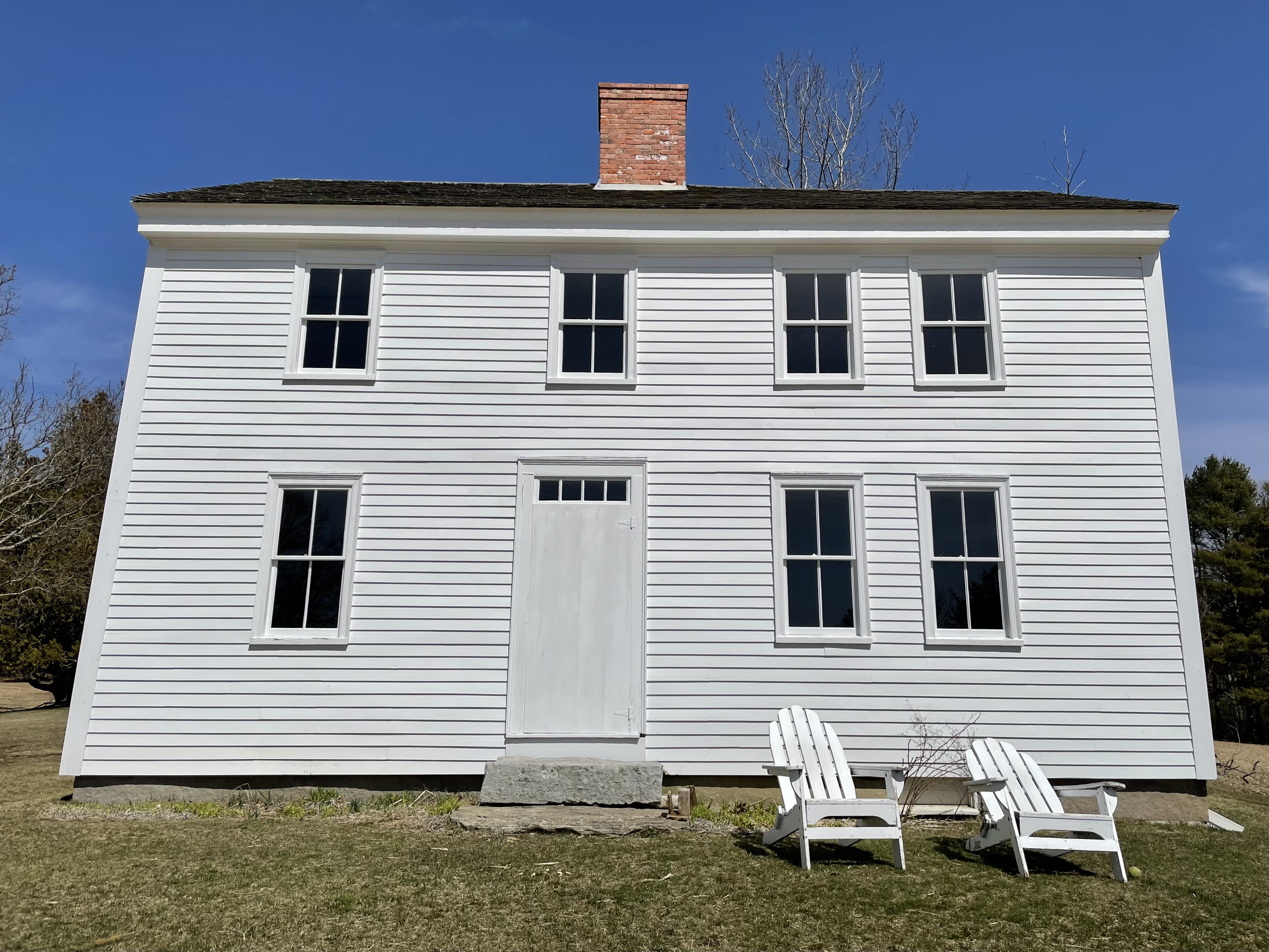
The front (southern side)

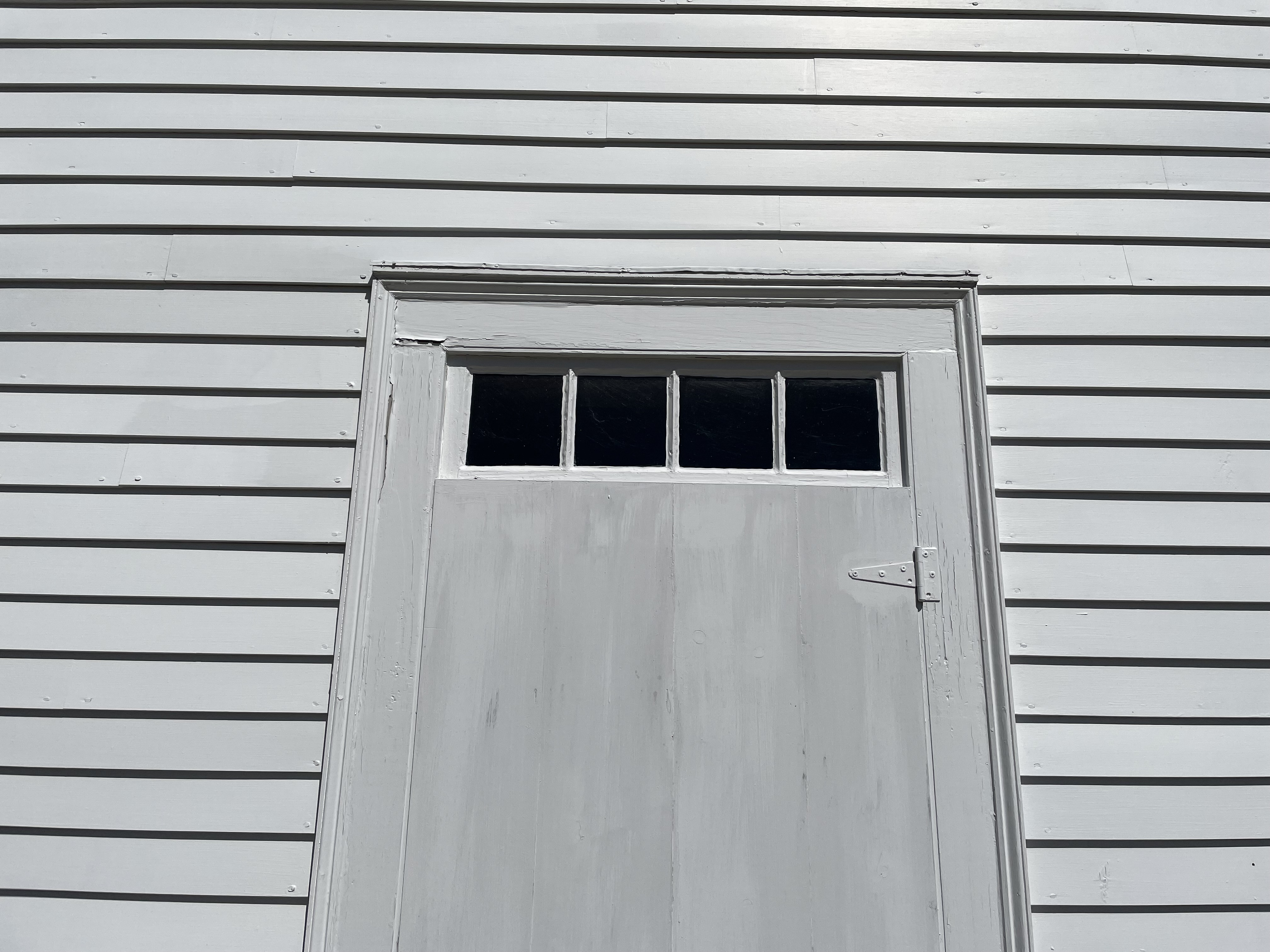
Transom above the front door

== See also ==
- National Register of Historic Places listings in Cumberland County, Maine
