= Al Spalding (naval architect) =

American naval architect (1932–2022)

- Spalding pictured around 2012
- Born: December 12, 1932; Fitchburg, Massachusetts, U.S.
- Died: May 6, 2022 (aged 89)
- Occupation: Naval architect

Eliot Amsden "Al" Spalding (December 12, 1932 – May 6, 2022) was an American naval architect. He designed and surveyed boats that were built throughout the United States and in twenty other countries. He was chief designer at John G. Alden, Inc. for fifteen years.

== Life and career ==
Spalding was born in 1932 in Fitchburg, Massachusetts, to Roland Spalding and Esther Amsden, their second of two children, following his sister Carolyn. Carolyn died in 2019, aged 91.

He grew up in nearby Leominster, graduating from Leominster High School. He then studied technical drawing at Worcester Technical High School (formerly Worcester Trade School), and graduated from the Westlawn Institute of Marine Technology.

During the Korean War, Spalding was a staff sergeant in the United States Army, serving in Germany with the 1st Division.

Spalding began working for John G. Alden, Inc., in Boston, where he spent fifteen years as a naval architect. He became the firm's chief designer. He was also a principal partner with Andel Associates, Lowell and Spalding and Marbridge Associates, as well as working with John Gilbert and Ted Hood. He also worked as a marine consultant and led courses teaching naval architecture and marine surveying, and was self-employed for a period.

Several of Spalding's designs were featured in national and international magazines and journals.

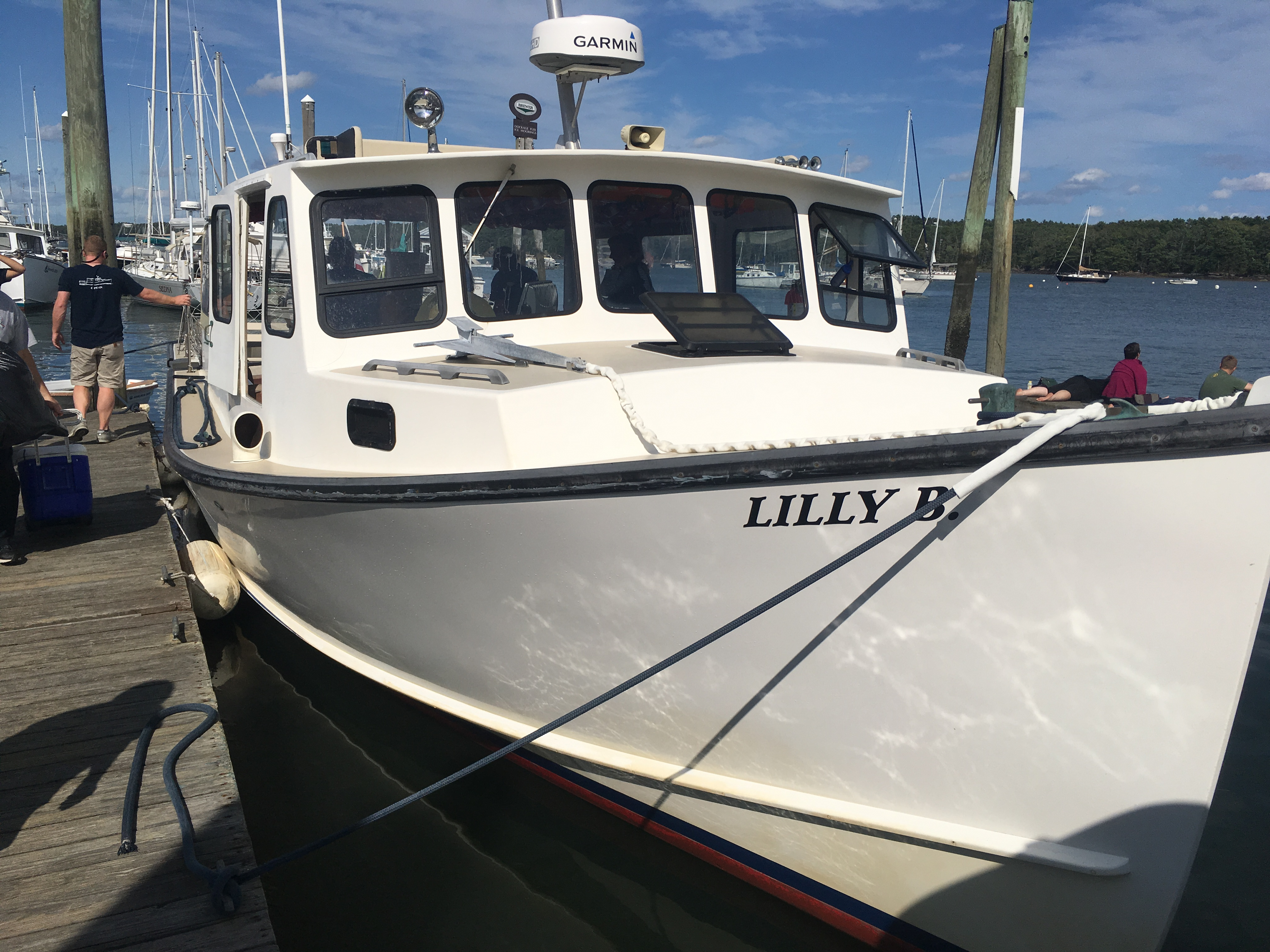
The Spalding-designed Lilly B, a ferry that runs between South Freeport, Maine, and nearby Bustins Island

== Personal life ==
Spalding married Sue Crabtree, with whom he had two sons: Sam and Andy.

He was a lifelong summer resident of Bustins Island, Maine, for whose village committee his wife is the clerk. It is believed his passion for boats was formed there.

Spalding was a keen musician. He was a banjo player with the Royal River Philharmonic Jazz Band for almost thirty years, and was a regular listener of WYAR, a heritage radio station in Yarmouth, Maine.

== Death ==
Spalding died in 2022, aged 89.
