= Interstate Shellfish Sanitation Conference =

The Interstate Shellfish Sanitation Conference (ISSC) is the federal cooperative body which manages the National Shellfish Sanitation Program. It was formed in 1982 to foster and promote the sanitation of shellfish through the cooperation of state and federal control agencies, the shellfish industry, and the academic community.

The ISSC manages three task forces: the Growing Areas task force, the Processing and Distribution task force, and Administration task force. Committees are often appointed to assist task forces in developing recommendations. Delegates from each state shellfish control agency vote on recommendations submitted by the task forces.

== See also ==
- Depuration
