= Rufus Soule =

American boat builder

Rufus Soule (July 16, 1785 – September 22, 1867) was a boat builder in Maine and served for several years in the state legislature.

== Early life ==
Rufus Soule was born July 16, 1785, in North Yarmouth, Cumberland County, Maine, the fourth son of Captain John Soule (1740–1814) and Elizabeth Mitchell (1747–1794).

== Career ==
Soule bought the yard at Porter's Landing in 1834 and became one of the most eminent shipbuilders in Maine. He built eighty-five vessels during his career. His son, Rufus C. Soule, joined him in the trade.

Soule served as a representative in the Maine Legislature from 1832 until 1838. A Democrat, he was a State Senator from Cumberland County in 1838. He also served as a justice of the peace.

== Family ==
Soule married Susan Mitchell on June 2, 1805, and they had eleven children together. After Susan died in 1853, he married Philomela Talbot and then married Hannah Bailey Small, a niece of his first wife.

== Death and burial ==
He died in 1867, at the age of 82, and is buried in the Porter's Landing Cemetery, Freeport, Maine.

== Legacy ==
The Soule family remains one of the prominent families in Freeport. The George C. Soule School existed in South Freeport until 1991, when students were transferred to the newly-built Mast Landing School, where the Soule name was used for one of the education tracks for students. The former Soule School location now houses the École Française du Maine.

In 2018, the Freeport Historical Society purchased a painting of Soule and his wife at auction.

== See also ==
- Harraseeket Historic District
