= Capt. Greenfield Pote House =

Historic house in Maine, United States

- U.S. National Register of Historic Places
- U.S. Historic district – Contributing property
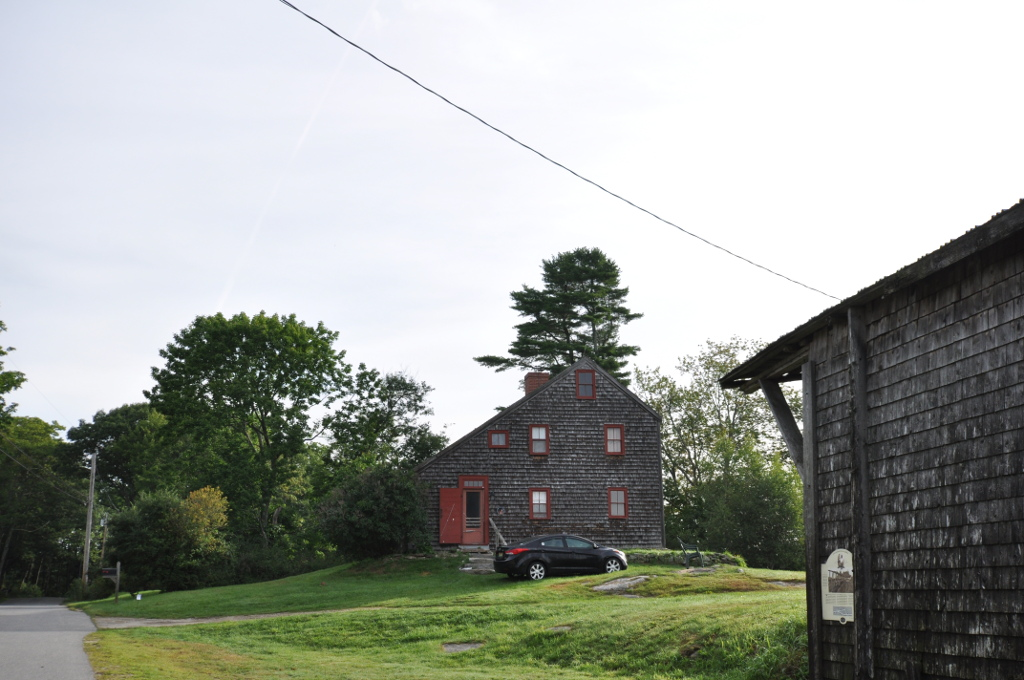
- Pictured in 2014

- Location within Maine Location within the United States
- Location: Wolfe's Neck Road, Freeport, Maine
- Coordinates: 43°49′49″N 70°04′58″W
- Built: 1760
- Architectural style: Saltbox
- Part of: Harraseeket Historic District (ID74000160)
- NRHP reference No.: 70000042

Significant dates
- Added to NRHP: October 6, 1970
- Designated CP: June 28, 1974

The Captain Greenfield Pote House is an historic house located on Wolfe's Neck Road in Freeport, Maine, United States. Built c. 1750 and supposedly moved to this location in 1765, it is Freeport's oldest surviving building. It was listed on the National Register of Historic Places in 1970, and is part of the Harraseeket Historic District. The property is owned by the Wolfe's Neck Center for Agriculture and the Environment.

== Description and history ==
The Greenfield Pote House is located on Wolfe's Neck, a peninsula across the tidal Harraseeket River from the central parts of Freeport. It is set on the east side of Wolfe's Neck Road, just south of its junction with Burnett Road, and north of Wolfe's Neck Woods State Park. It is a two-story wood-frame structure, with a gable roof that slopes down to the first floor in the rear, giving it a saltbox profile. Its foundation is unmortared fieldstone. It is finished in split cedar shingles, many of which are likely still original.

The house was built about 1750 on Falmouth Neck, the peninsula that is now the city of Portland, but was then known as Falmouth. From 1760 it was owned by Captain Greenfield Pote, a ship's captain. After complaints were filed by Falmouth residents that he set sail on the Sabbath, Pote decided to move. In 1765 the house was loaded onto a flatboat, and sailed about 13 miles (21 km) down Casco Bay to this area, where it was then moved on rollers to its present location.

The interior of the house has had little alteration beyond the introduction of electricity. About 1970 it came into the hands of the Smith family, who were dedicated to its preservation, and who donated the land that became Wolfe's Neck Woods State Park.

The barn was restored in 2017–2018.

== Pote Cemetery ==
The Pote Cemetery is named after Captain Greenfield Pote and is located on private property across the street from the house. Graves mostly range from 1797 to 1921. Greenfield Pote is also buried in the cemetery, though his wife was buried in Falmouth.

== See also ==
- National Register of Historic Places listings in Cumberland County, Maine
