= Depuration =

Farming practice

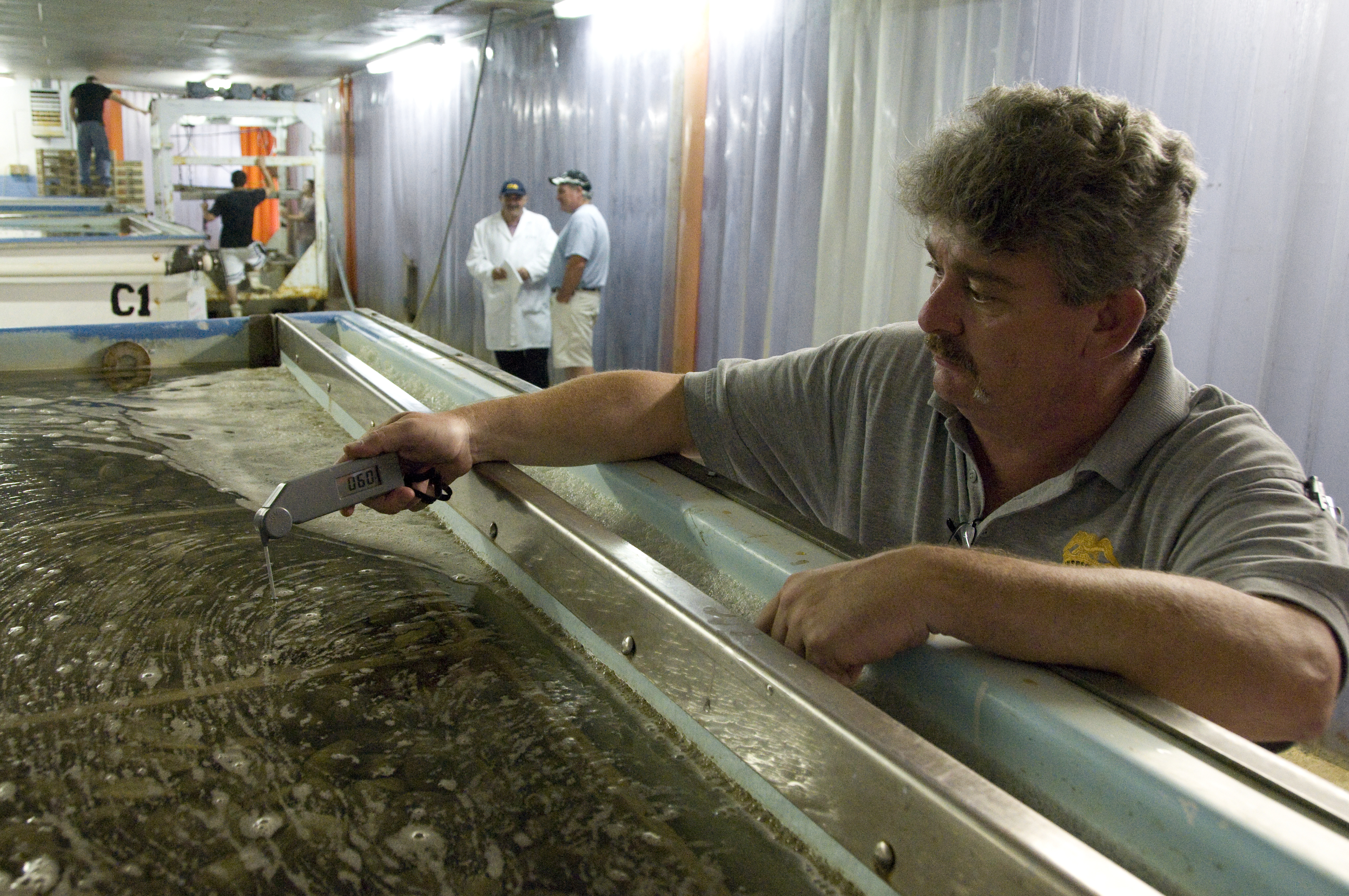
A New Jersey state inspector checking the water temperature in a clam cleansing tank

Depuration of seafood is the process by which marine or freshwater animals are placed into a clean water environment for a period of time to allow purging of biological contaminants (such as Escherichia coli) and physical impurities (such as sand and silt). The most common subjects of depuration are bivalves such as oysters, clams, and mussels.

== History ==
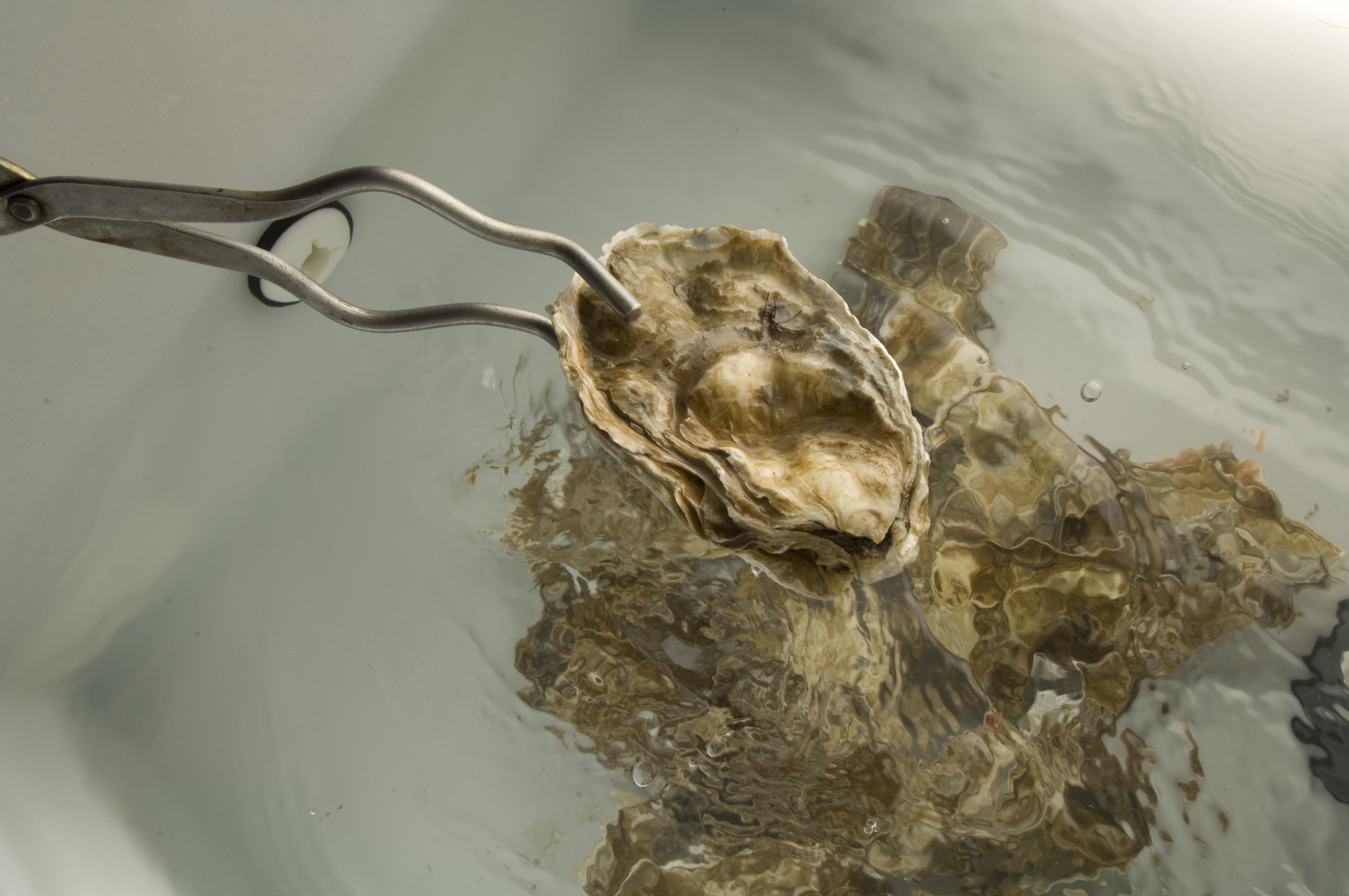
Oysters in a depuration tank at a laboratory

Most research and publications focus primarily on the depuration of seafood rather than freshwater animals. The commonly defined depuration process has been practiced since the 1800s originating as a method to prevent typhoid fever (via Salmonella enterica subsp. enterica, serovar Typhi) and other illnesses attributed to polluted shellfish being consumed. As coastal seawater became increasingly contaminated with sewage-borne bacteria, early research investigated the use of disgorging tanks. Today, modern seafood depuration is performed in segregated physical tanks using treated seawater that is sterilised either by way of chlorine, ultraviolet, or ozone.

Seafood depuration is legislated or regulated in many countries, including the United States, EU members such as France, Ireland, and Italy, and Japan. Oversight is managed by internationally recognised agencies, for example, in the United States, the National Shellfish Sanitation Program (NSSP) administered by the Interstate Shellfish Sanitation Conference sets guidelines on depuration and is recognised by the U.S. Food and Drug Administration. In Canada, the Canadian Food Inspection Agency (CFIA), Fisheries and Oceans Canada (DFO) and Environment and Climate Change Canada (ECCC) actively compile the manual for the Canadian Shellfish Sanitation Program (CSSP). The Codex Alimentarius, which is overseen by the World Health Organization (WHO) and Food and Agriculture Organisation of the United Nations (FAO), both recognises and encourages the application of seafood depuration.

According to the FAO in December 2006, France had 1,422 depuration facilities, Italy had 144, Japan had over 1,000. The long history of the depuration process which expands across many countries and is recognised by international agencies is contrasted by the scarce or nonexistent data in the commercial space of the seafood industry. In a majority formal research, publications and governmental regulations, depuration is approached in the form of "public protection" and not in the form of "public awareness". One research study attempts to link the benefits of consumer awareness of shellfish depuration and found that surveyed restaurants were reluctant to sell depurated seafood. Whereas in the same study, consumers surveyed indicated they were prepared to pay a premium for depurated oysters. However, the willingness to pay a premium was expressed after the consumer was informed about depuration and depurated seafood indicating the average consumer was unaware about the depuration process.
