= Harraseeket Historic District =

Historic district in Maine, United States

- U.S. National Register of Historic Places
- U.S. Historic district
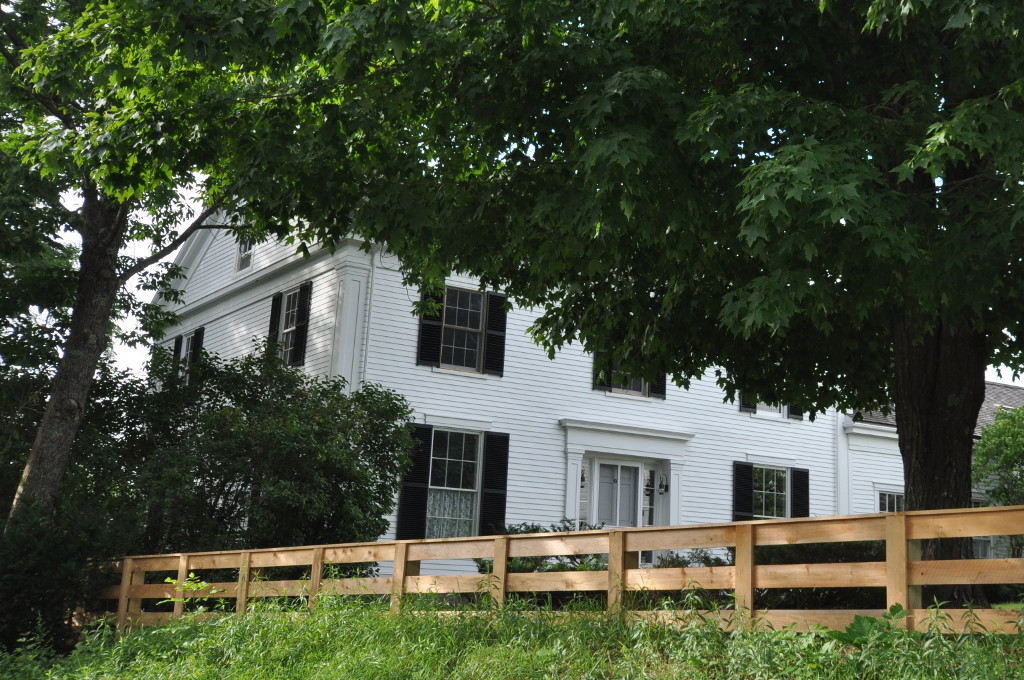
- A house on Harraseeket Road in South Freeport. It stands in front of the remains of Casco Castle

- Location within Maine Location within the United States
- Location: Roughly both sides of the Harraseeket River, including South Freeport, Porters Landing, and Mast Landing, Freeport, Maine
- Area: 6,000 acres (2,400 ha)
- Built: 1800
- Architect: Multiple
- Architectural style: Greek Revival, Federal
- NRHP reference No.: 74000160
- Added to NRHP: June 28, 1974

The Harraseeket Historic District encompasses some of the oldest maritime village areas of the town of Freeport, Maine. It includes properties along both banks of the tidal Harraseeket River, from the Mast Landing area (roughly where Bow Street crosses the river) in the north to Wolf Neck and the villages of Porter's (or Bartol's) Landing and South Freeport on the west bank of the river. The district was listed on the National Register of Historic Places in 1974.

== Mast Landing ==
The Mast Landing area was an important maritime site in Maine in the mid-18th century. It was here that trees felled for the purposes of being used as ship masts were brought from the Maine interior for shipment to England. By the late 18th century a small village had grown up in this area, most of whose surviving elements are now in ruins. Notable among the survivors is the Pettengill House and Farm, one of the finest examples of a traditional New England saltbox in Maine, some of whose farm acreage has preserved its setting. Four other houses survive in the area from the early 19th century.

== Wolfe's Neck ==
Wolfe's Neck is a peninsula which separates the Harraseeket River from the rest of Casco Bay. This area has retained much rural character, with a number of 18th and 19th-century houses. The most notable is the Capt. Greenfield Pote House, a little-altered saltbox built in the mid-18th century.

== Porter's Landing ==
Porter's Landing, earlier known as Bartol's Landing for the family that owned land in the area, is located on the west side of the Harraseeket, south of Mast Landing. It includes a cohesive grouping of Federal and Greek Revival housing, built mainly in the early 19th century. These houses tend to be larger and with more elaborate detail than those found at Mast Landing. Unusual in the area is the Lane-Porter House, a Federal-period duplex with later Greek Revival alterations. Rufus Soule built many ships here after purchasing the yard in 1834.

== South Freeport ==
South Freeport lies south of Porter's Landing, and has the largest concentration of historic resources of the area, including the 185-foot (56 m) stone tower of Casco Castle, a resort that was destroyed in a 1914 fire.

The buildings in this area are predominantly Greek Revival or of later 19th-century revival styles. The South Freeport Congregational Church, built in 1884, is a Queen Anne structure. The Ambrose Curtis House is a transitional Greek Revival-Italianate house, with a colonnaded facade and Italianate brackets. Also notable in the district are buildings of the Soule Shipyard, dating to the 1830s.

== See also ==
- National Register of Historic Places listings in Cumberland County, Maine
