= Lilly B =

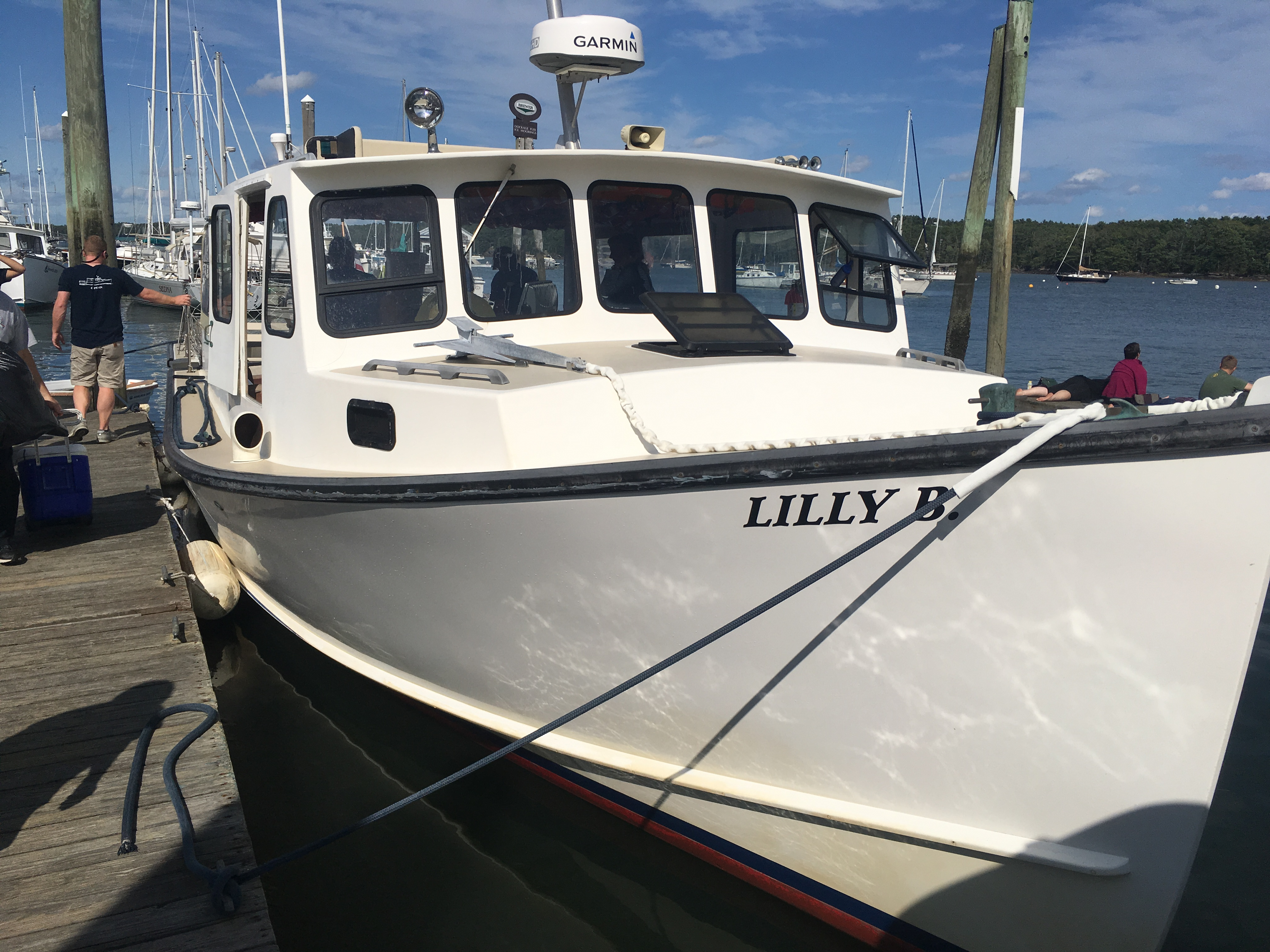
- The ferry docked at Brewers in South Freeport, 2017

History

United States
- Name: Lilly B
- Namesake: Lilly May Brewer
- Owner: Bustins Island, Maine
- Route: Brewers Point, South Freeport to Bustins Island
- Builder: Bradley Simmons
- Completed: 2000
- Maiden voyage: April 22, 2000 (26 years ago)
- Status: Operational

General characteristics
- Type: Ferry

The Lilly B is a ferry owned by Bustins Island, Maine, United States. It runs several times daily between South Freeport and Bustins Island from Memorial Day to Columbus Day. It is named for Lilly May Brewer (1906–1977), who, along with her husband Ralph (1900–1968), was the caretaker of Bustins during the 1950s and 1960s.

The vessel was designed by naval architect Al Spalding and built by Bradley Simmons. Its maiden voyage took place on April 22, 2000.

The ferry has a capacity of 44 passengers, and it is not permitted to carry propane or gasoline as baggage.

The ferry is staffed largely by islanders, and its passengers are almost all its residents. As of 2022, its captain is Painter Soule, who was formerly a member of the crew. Archie Ross formerly captained the ferry for over fifty years, and the island's public landing is now named for him.

== Schedule ==
In the high season (mid-June to early September), the Lilly B runs four round-trips daily on weekdays and once on weekends. A late 7.00 PM (inbound) and 7.30 PM (outbound) service runs on Fridays only.

In the off season (late May to mid-June), the ferry runs twice on Tuesdays, three times on Fridays and Saturdays, and four times on Sundays.

Additional runs occur on Memorial Day and Columbus Day.

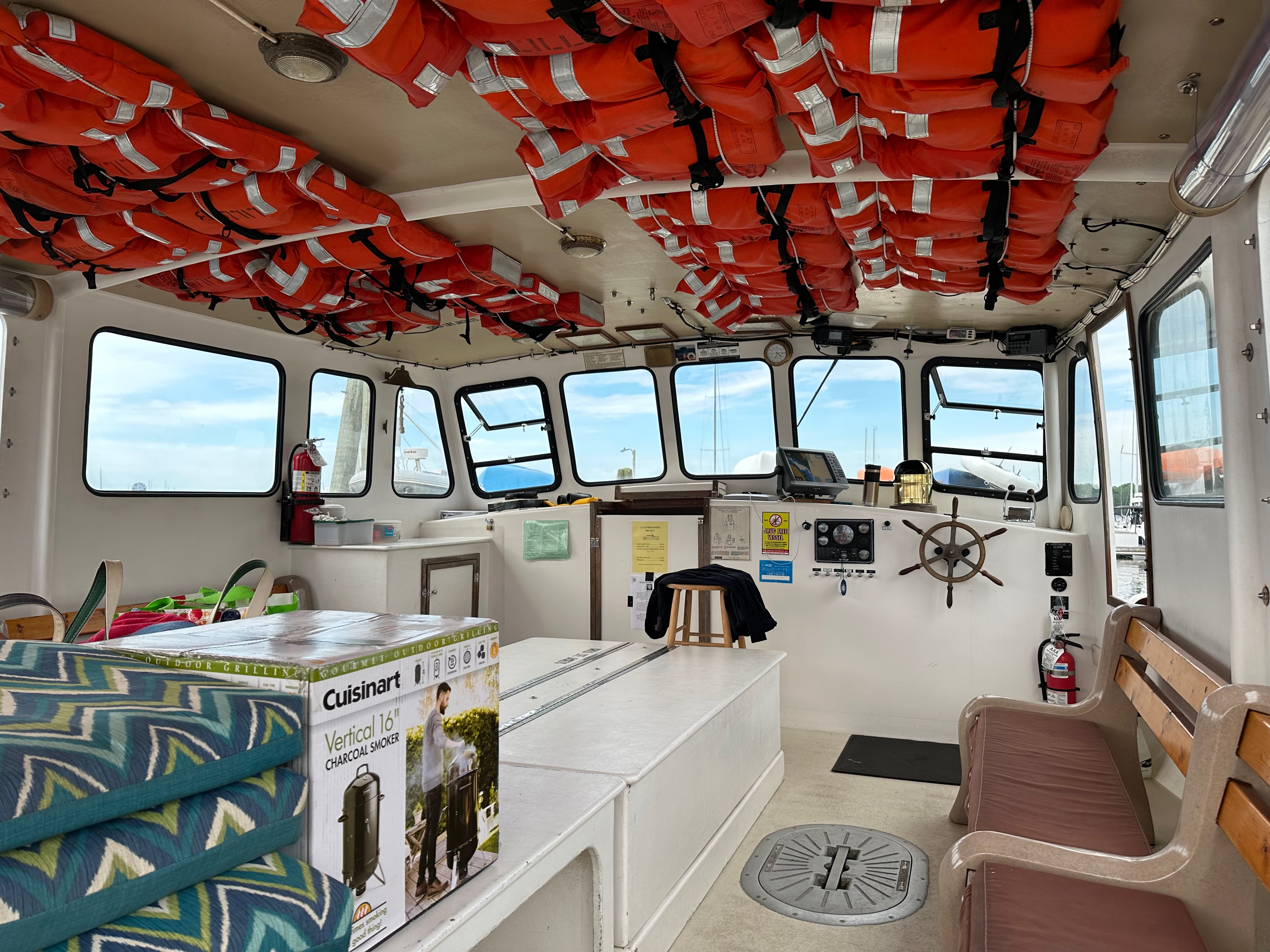
Aboard the Lilly B, 2023

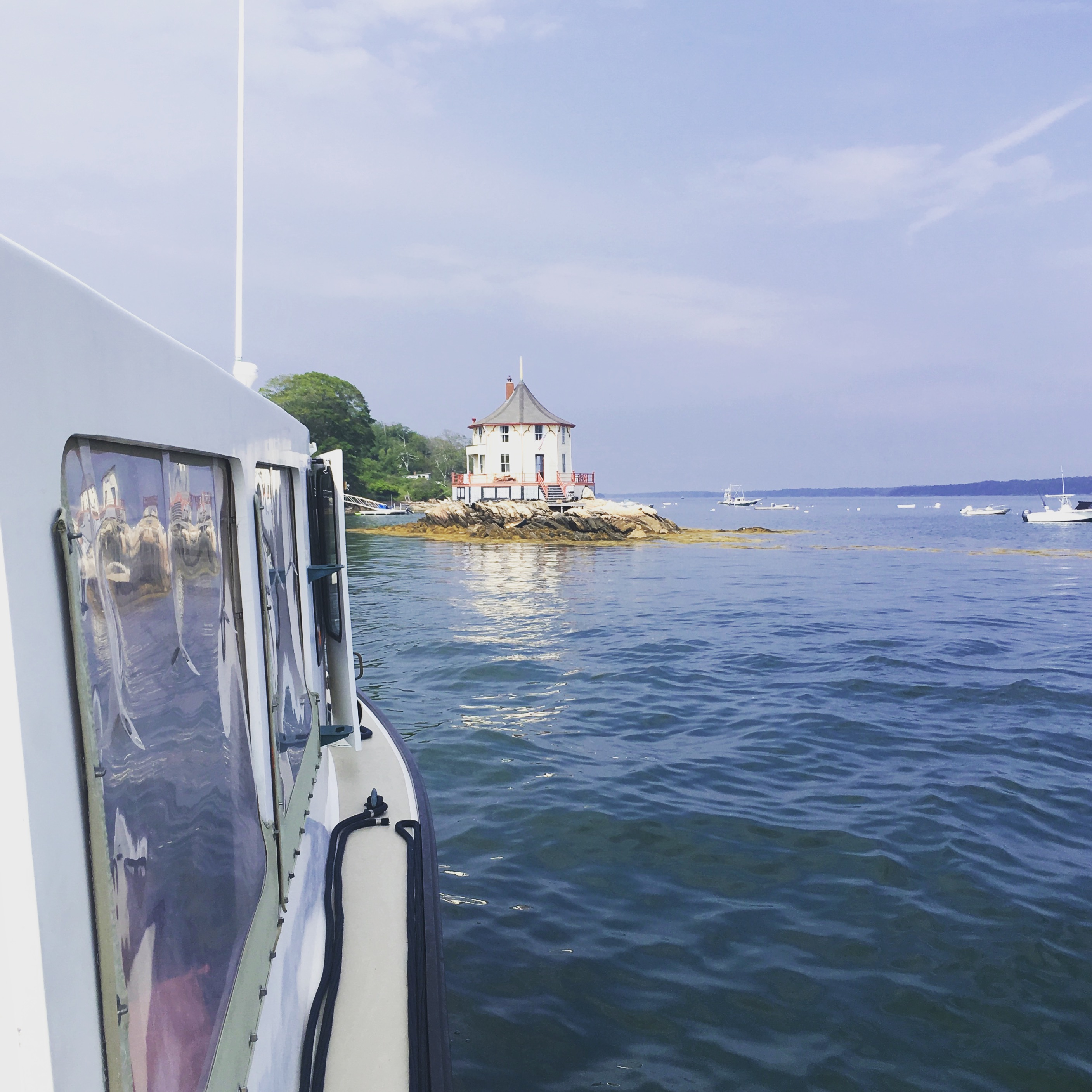
Approaching Bustins Island's public dock. The building in view is known as the nubble
