= National Shellfish Sanitation Program =

The National Shellfish Sanitation Program (NSSP) is a program under which the federal Food and Drug Administration works cooperatively with the states, the Interstate Shellfish Sanitation Conference, and industry to assure the safety of molluscan shellfish (clams, oysters, mussels) for human consumption. Among other things, all such products entering interstate commerce must be handled by state-certified dealers, be properly tagged, be tracked by appropriate records, and be processed in plants that meet sanitation requirements. The FDA continually reviews state shellfish control programs for their effectiveness.

== See also ==
- Depuration
- Interstate Shellfish Sanitation Conference
