= Phot (given name) =

Phot (pronounced [pʰót]) is the RTGS romanization of the Thai masculine given name พจน์.

People with the name include:

- Phot Phahonyothin (1887–1947), also known by the noble title Phraya Phahonphonphayuhasena, the first prime minister of Thailand
- Poj Arnon (born 1970), Thai film director
- Pote Sarasin (1905–2000), Thai diplomat and former prime minister
