= Winslow Memorial Park =

Public park in Freeport, Maine, U.S.

- Winslow Park
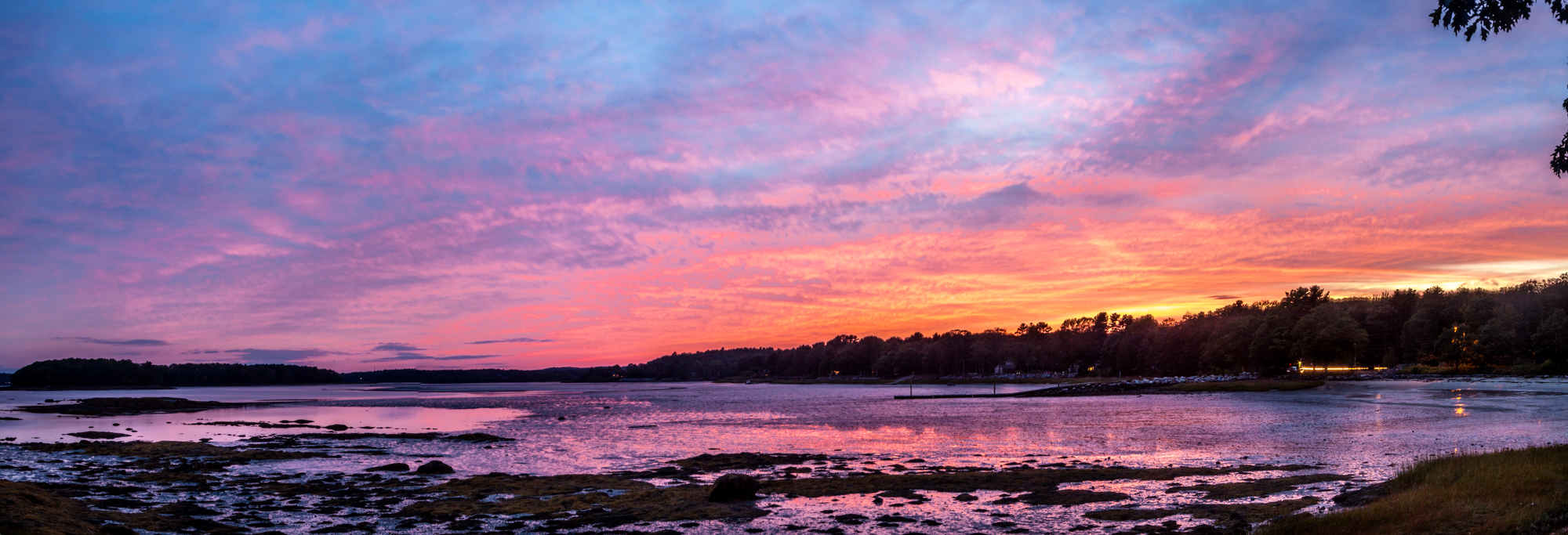
- Sunset from the park, looking west toward its entrance
- Interactive map of Winslow Memorial Park
- Type: Coastal park and campground
- Location: Freeport, Maine, U.S.
- Coordinates: 43.8029618°N 70.1137239°W
- Area: 90 acres (0.36 km^{2}; 0.14 mi^{2})
- Created: 1953 (73 years ago)
- Owner: Town of Freeport
- Camp sites: Around 100
- Water: Harraseeket River; Casco Bay

Winslow Memorial Park (also known as Winslow Park) is a coastal park and campground in Freeport, Maine, United States. Set in 90 acres (0.14 sq mi), it is located near the southern end of the Harraseeket River, near its mouth with Casco Bay, at the eastern end of Staples Point Road. The northern side of the park looks out over Staples Cove.

The park, which is owned by the Town of Freeport, is a popular camping ground between May and October annually, with around one hundred plots set out either side of Winslow Park Way, which leads northeast to the tip of the peninsula, known as Stockbridge Point, on which the park is located. A children's playground is located at the western end of the park, near the parking lot.

A self-funded facility, it grossed revenue of $346,000 in 2019 and $255,000 in 2020, the first full year of the COVID-19 pandemic.

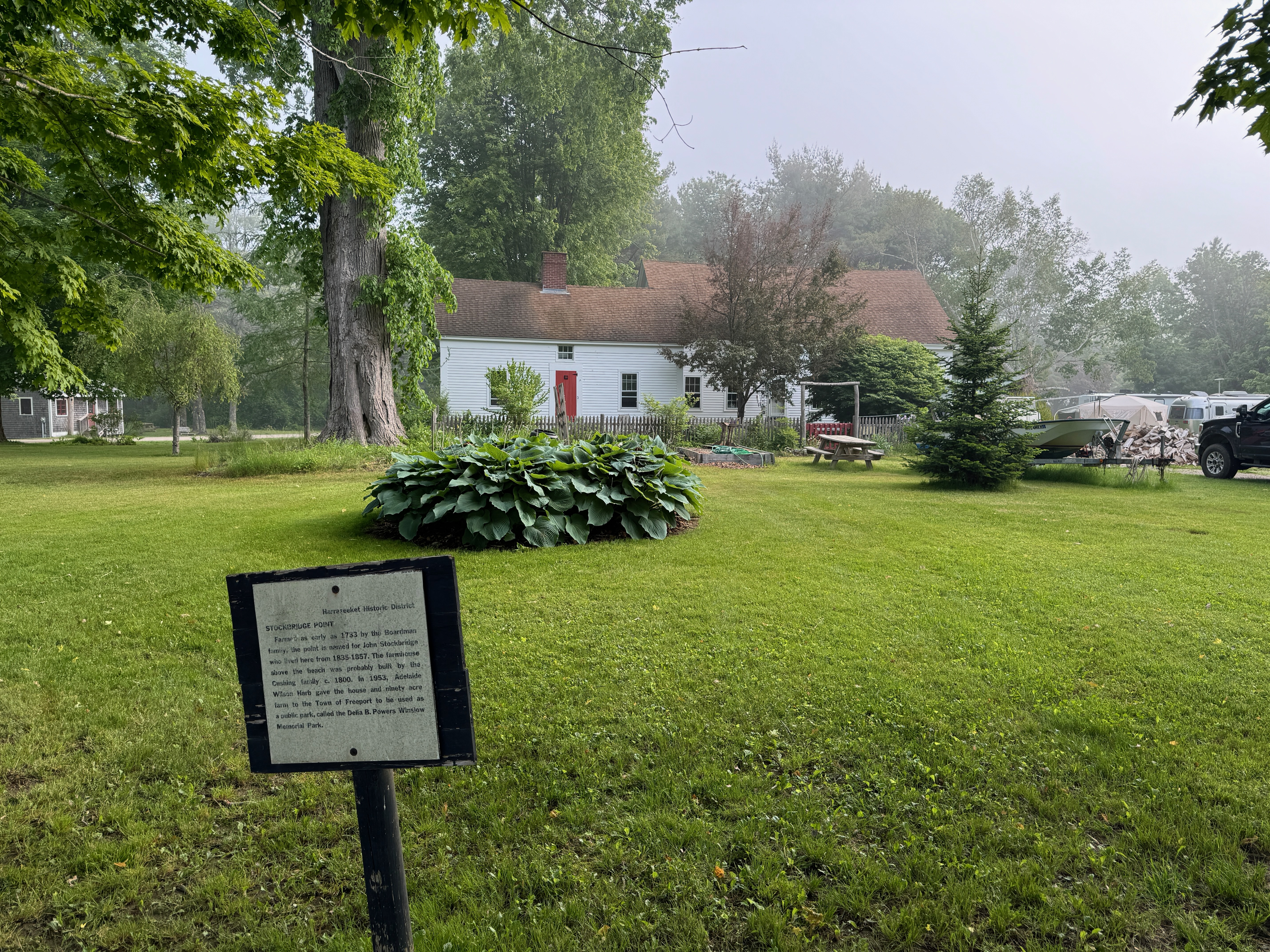
Farmhouse at the entrance to the campground, believed to have been built by the Cushing family around 1800

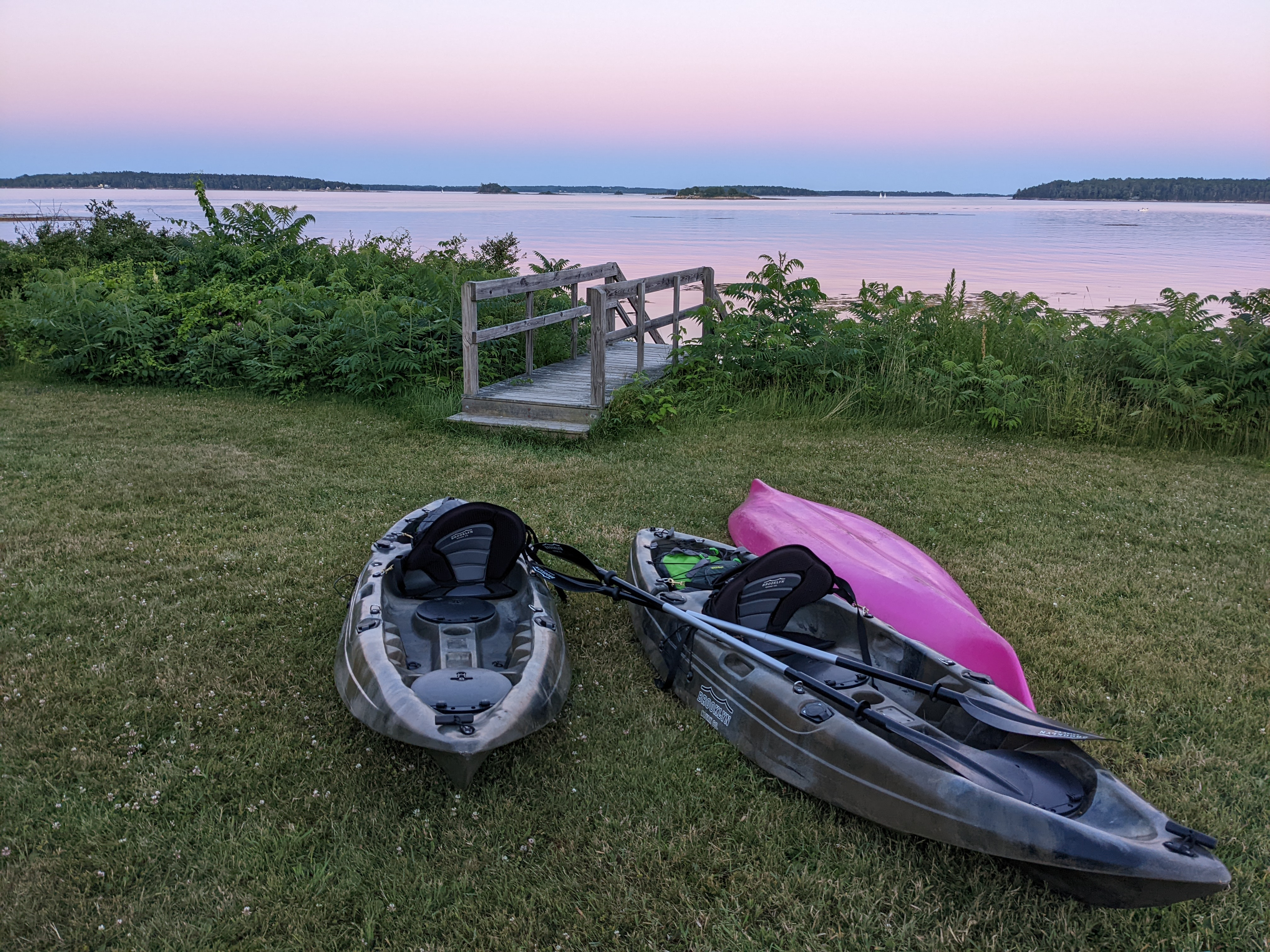
Looking southeast into Casco Bay from the campgrounds toward Moshier Island (right) and Harpswell

== History ==
The park is named for Delia B. Powers Winslow. It was gifted to the town by her daughter, Adelaide Winslow Harb, in 1953. Harb Cottage, a rental property, is located at the eastern end of Winslow Park Way.
