= Porter's Landing =

Porter's Landing Bartol's Landing (formerly)
- Community
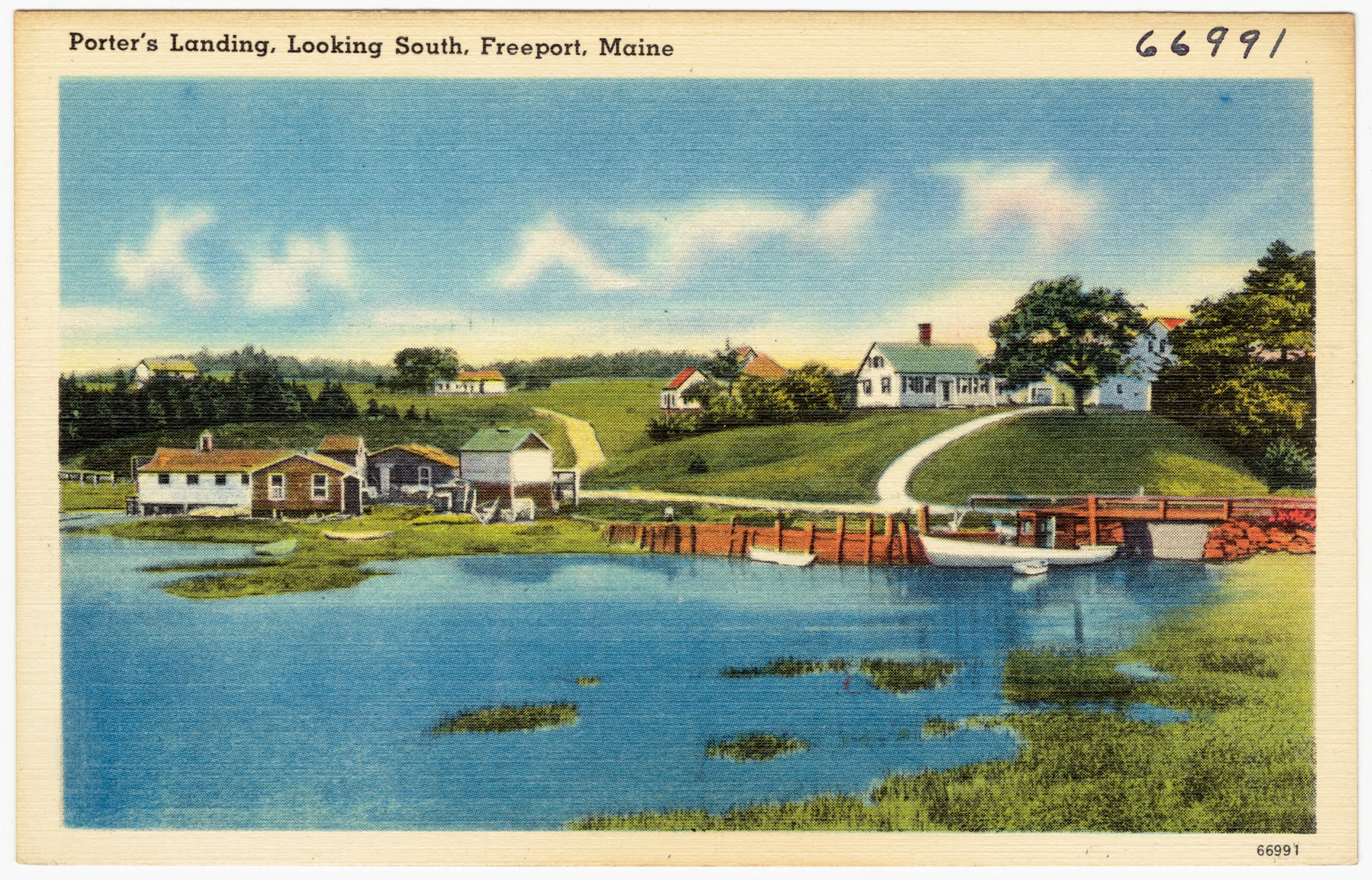
- Looking south to Porter's Landing on a postcard dated between 1930 and 1945
- Interactive map of Porter's Landing
- Coordinates: 43.84413°N 70.09961°W
- Country: United States
- State: Maine
- County: Cumberland
- Town: Freeport
- Time zone: UTC-5 (Eastern (EST))
  - Summer (DST): UTC-4 (EDT)

Porter's Landing (formerly known as Bartol's Landing) is a community in Freeport, Maine, United States. Located above the Harraseeket River, around 1 mile (1.6 km) south of Freeport town center, it was the port for Freeport prior to the arrival of the railroad. It was also known for its shipyard, along with its salt works, brickyard and a crab-meat factory. Porter's Landing is part of Harraseeket Historic District, which is listed on the National Register of Historic Places.

At Porter's Landing, the town of Freeport maintains a public launch for small boats called Dunning Boat Yard, and leases land and facilities there to a commercial boat yard that provides maritime services including dock construction.

== History ==
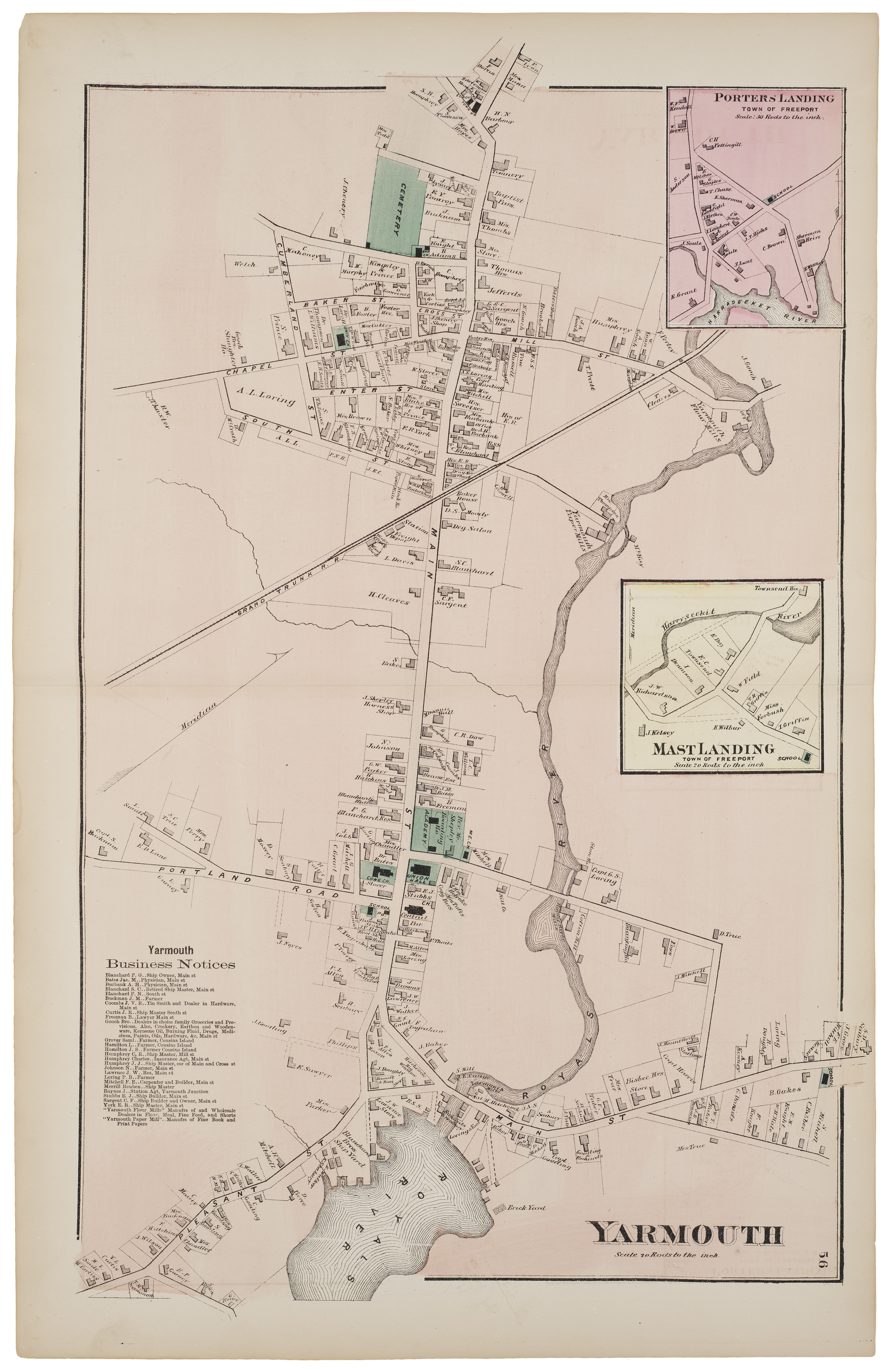
An 1871 map with a Porter's Landing inset

Porter's Landing is named for Seward Porter (1753–1800), who was born in Weymouth, Massachusetts. He and his wife, Eleanor Merrill, moved to Freeport, District of Maine, from Falmouth (the part now today's Portland) in 1782. He purchased land from William Coolidge in Falmouth in 1777. He and Eleanor arrived with three children, and at least eleven more were born at Porter's Landing.

The shipyard, which was situated near today's Falls Point Marine, was run during the mid-19th century by John Blethen (1810–1882) and his five employees. He took over the shipyard from Samuel, William and Seward Porter Jr., who inherited it upon their father's death in 1800. The privateer Dash was built there in 1813 by James Brewer for the Porter boys. It was commissioned, for service in the War of 1812, the following year by United States President James Madison. The vessel evaded blockades and captured British ships, but disappeared in Georges Bank in a storm in January 1815. It was under the command of John Porter; he and sixty men (including his brothers Jeremiah and Ebenezer) were lost. In 1823, Seward Jr. became the owner of the first steamboat to be brought to Maine. He lived until 1838 (aged 54); Samuel until 1847 (aged 68); and William until 1868 (aged 80). The eldest of Seward Sr.'s sons, Joseph, was a ship's captain. He died in Freeport in 1850, aged 72. The Dash is now the name of Freeport Historical Society's newsletter, begun in 1969.

Another citizen, Rufus Soule (1785–1867), was a slave trader. He was married three times. His first wife, Susan, died in 1805. He remarried, to Philomela, who died in 1858. His third wife, Hannah Small, survived him by thirty years.
