= Harraseeket River =

Tidal river in Freeport, Maine, U.S.

Coordinates: 43.80480°N 70.10033°W

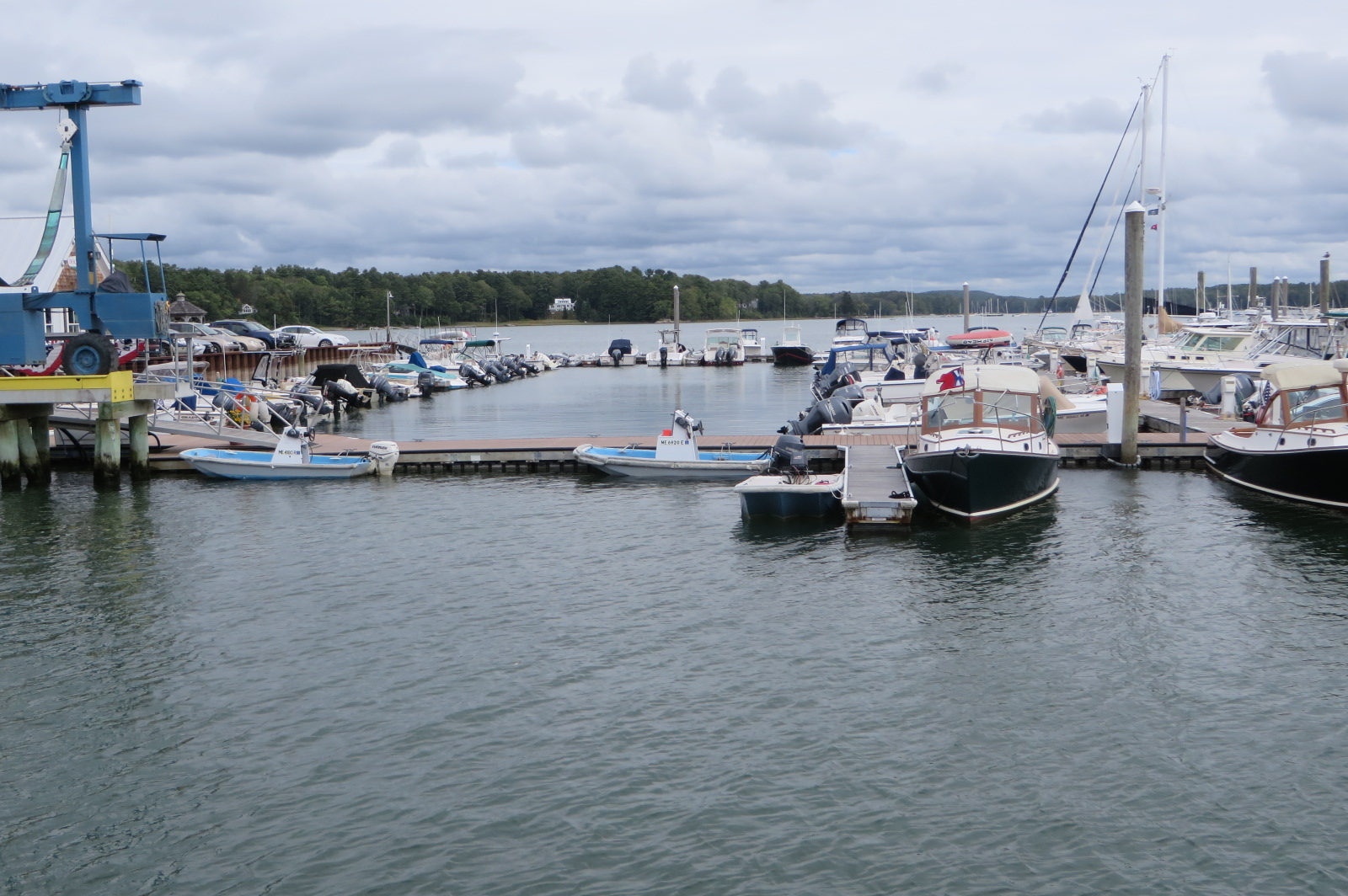
- The Harraseeket River in South Freeport, Maine

Location
- Country: United States

Physical characteristics
- Source
  - location: Maine

The Harraseeket River is a 3.2-mile-long (5.1 km) tidal river in the town of Freeport within the U.S. state of Maine. It forms a northern arm of Casco Bay.

Several smaller streams flow into the Harraseeket that have their headwaters in Freeport and Brunswick, to include Frost Gully Brook and Kelsey Brook. The Harraseeket embayment joins Casco Bay between Moore Point on its eastern shore, and Stockbridge Point on its western shore, with a small island called Pound of Tea dividing the channel.

The Maine Department of Inland Fisheries & Wildlife includes the Harraseeket in the designated Maquoit and Middle Bay Focus Area of Statewide Ecological Significance that extends from Harpswell Neck to the Royal River in Yarmouth, recognizing a diverse habitat for fish and wildlife including tidal marshes, eelgrass beds and mudflats.

Protected lands open to the public along the Harraseeket include Wolfe's Neck Woods State Park, the Mast Landing Audubon Sanctuary, Tidebrook Preserve and Winslow Memorial Park.

== Ecology ==
The Harraseeket River supports a range of wildlife and tidal organisms, to include ducks like Barrow's goldeneye, common goldeneye, northern pintail and lesser scaup; fish like Atlantic mackerel and rainbow smelt; and shellfish like blue mussels, soft-shell clams and green crabs. Herring gulls and great black-backed gulls are a constant in the Harraseeket River basin, along with cormorants.

In 2023, three dams were removed from Frost Gully Brook which flows into the Harraseeket River, improving the habitat there for brook trout.

The municipal Freeport Sewer District operates a secondary wastewater treatment plant licensed to discharge an average of 750,000 gallons daily into the Harraseeket River via an outfall pipe. Flows are monitored seasonally for Enterococci bacteria and under the parameters of the National Shellfish Sanitation Program.

== Marine economy ==
Multiple marinas and boatyards operate in the Harraseeket with sailboats and power boats moored in an extensive anchorage in the lower reaches of the estuary. Other enterprises include commercial lobster boats, an island ferry, tour boats and other working boats.

As of 2025, the Town of Freeport allowed 350 vessel moorings in the Harraseeket, with nearly 270 in use for recreational vessels not including about 30 assigned for marina use, and just over 30 more designated for commercial fishing and marine enterprises. The Harraseeket has another 220 slips for vessels at docks.

The town of Freeport maintains a public dock on the west bank of the Harraseeket, and employs a harbor master and shellfish warden.

== History ==
Prior to the arrival of European settlers, Abenaki peoples who were allied with the larger Wabanaki Confederacy lived in the Casco Bay region. Some researchers have identified the Almouchiquois or Aucocisco as the area's dominant group centered on the Presumpscot River west of the Harraseeket, while another group called the Pejebscot were located along the Androscoggin River east of the Harraseeket.

The earliest colonial settlements along the Harraseeket were linked to farming or harvesting pine trees for ship masts for the Royal Navy, with those logging efforts centered initially on the Piscataqua River. Trees marked for Royal Navy use were marked with a "broad arrow" symbol, with a penalty of 100 pounds sterling to be levied on anyone who cut down any of those trees without permission, but with evidence that plenty of local residents flouted the rule. Mast Landing, situated in the upper navigable reaches of the Harraseeket, became a loading point for the timber, and in time shipbuilding emerged as a major industry on the Harraseeket.

During the 17th and early 18th century, a number of Maine farmers turned to shipbuilding as a way to capitalize on surplus timber they cleared to grow crops, typically forming syndicates to share ownership and any profits from cargoes. While some vessels were built on farm properties and then launched there or hauled overland to waterways, small shipyards began opening along rivers and harbors that attracted and then groomed over succeeding generations a homegrown industry of shipwrights, tradesmen and laborers under the direction of "master builders".

Born in 1753 in Weymouth, Massachusetts, by 1777 Seward Porter had built a homestead near Mast Landing. In 1782, Porter commenced shipbuilding at what would become known as Porter's Landing.

In the 1830s, Rufus Soule began leasing space at Porter's Landing for a shipyard that would launch more than 100 vessels. Others would follow downstream along the Harraseeket River, to include shipyards under the names Briggs & Cushing, Talbot, Bliss and Soule Brothers.

The Harraseeket River also saw development of commercial fisheries, sawmills and textile factories.

In 1974, the Harraseeket Historic District was added to the National Register of Historic Places, including Wolfe's Neck, Mast Landing, Porter's Landing and the village of South Freeport.

== See also ==
- List of rivers of Maine
