= Bustins Island =

Island in Casco Bay, Maine, United States

Bustins Island Bustions Island (former)
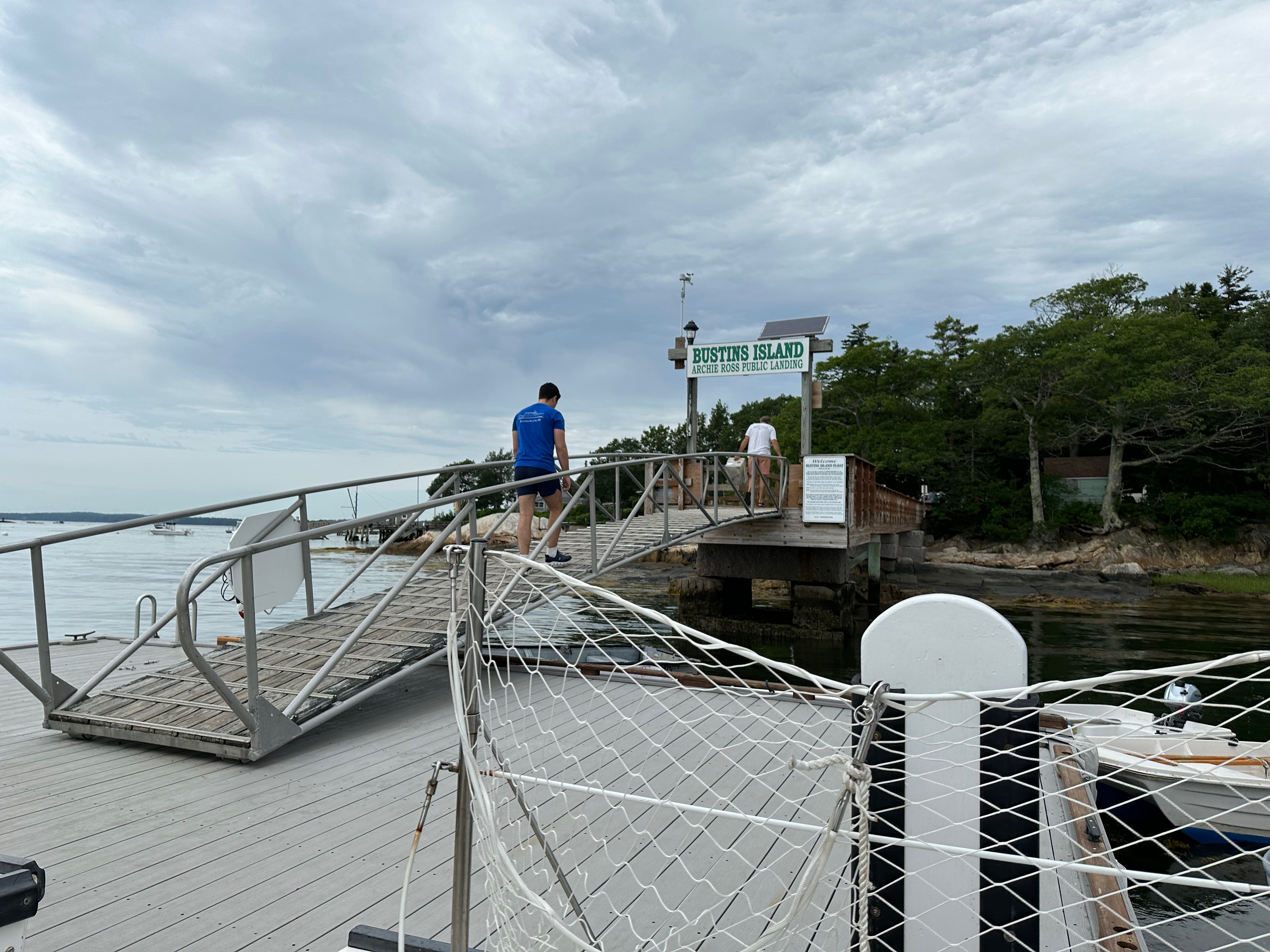
- Bustins Island public landing, named for Archie Ross, the former captain of its ferry

- Location in Cumberland County and the state of Maine.
- Coordinates: 43.800192°N 70.07176°W
- Country: United States
- State: Maine
- County: Cumberland
- Town: Freeport
- Time zone: UTC-5 (Eastern (EST))
  - Summer (DST): UTC-4 (EDT)
- ZIP code: 04013
- Area code: 207

Bustins Island is a 138-acre island in inner Casco Bay, Maine, United States. It is one of 18 islands that are within the town boundaries of Freeport. Although physically located within Freeport, the Bustins Island Village Corporation is a self-governing entity. The island has approximately 117 summer cottages, with the earliest dating to the 18th century.

The island's main road is Bustins Island Road, which loops around the island for about 1.5 miles (2.4 km). It is bisected by offshoot roads. Every island building stands beside one of the roads, allowing for easy access for trash removal.

The island operates its own ferry, the Lilly B, which debarks from the South Freeport town wharf. Typically, the ferry operates from Memorial Day weekend through Columbus Day weekend. The ferry arrives at public dock at the southeastern tip of the island, but there is also a steamer dock on the island's western side. A public landing ramp is located at the northern end of the island.

The island's interior is undeveloped because it is part of a resource protection area, which comprises parcels of land that are now protected against development. It, as with the rest of the island, is under constant threat of fire. There is no pressured water on the island, and since most of the cottages are over one hundred years old, they can be easily set alight accidentally. Six houses have burned to the ground over the years, the last in 2007. Due to this risk, no open fires or fire pits are permitted.

== History ==
Bustins Island has eight known shell middens where Native Americans camped, with the Abenaki people having populated the region at the time colonial settlers arrived in the Casco Bay region.

Bustins Island is named for John Bustion, who is thought to have acquired the island through purchase or a grant by 1660, and who sold it in 1667 to William Haines, a resident at the time of present-day Flying Point in Freeport just north of Bustins Island. After settlers were driven out of the Casco Bay region during conflicts with indigenous tribes that extended into the 18th century, in 1738 Bustins Island was awarded to John Powell as recompense for his work on a General Court of Massachusetts Committee on Eastern Claims and Settlements that was created to adjudicate land claims by landowners whose deeds had been destroyed or lost during the conflict. In 1789, Bustins Island was included in the boundaries of the new town of Freeport after its secession from historic North Yarmouth. In 1797, the estate of Jeremiah Powell sold the island to James Bibber for $300, with the island assigned the name Bibbers Island on nautical charts by the U.S. Geodesic Survey during the 19th century. Bibber sold most of the island in 1834 to Cumberland resident John Johnson for $1,000. Twenty years later, Johnson sold most of the island to Harpswell resident Elisha Stover Jr. for $1,500, along with adjacent Little Bustins Island. In 1876, Henry Merrill and Edwin Morse acquired the entirety of Bustins Island for the same amount. By 1888, a schoolhouse was built on Bustins Island.

A ferry, the Lilly B, is named for Lilly May Brewer (1906–1977), who, along with her husband Ralph (1900–1968), was the caretaker of Bustins during the 1950s and 1960s.

== Amenities ==
In addition to the Bustins Island Village Corporation created in 1913 via state charter, a Cottagers Association of Bustins Island has been active since 1905 to coordinate island activities and raise funds for associated costs. For the fiscal year running through June 2026, the Town of Freeport assigned $350,000 in appropriated funds for Bustins Island support.

=== The Store ===
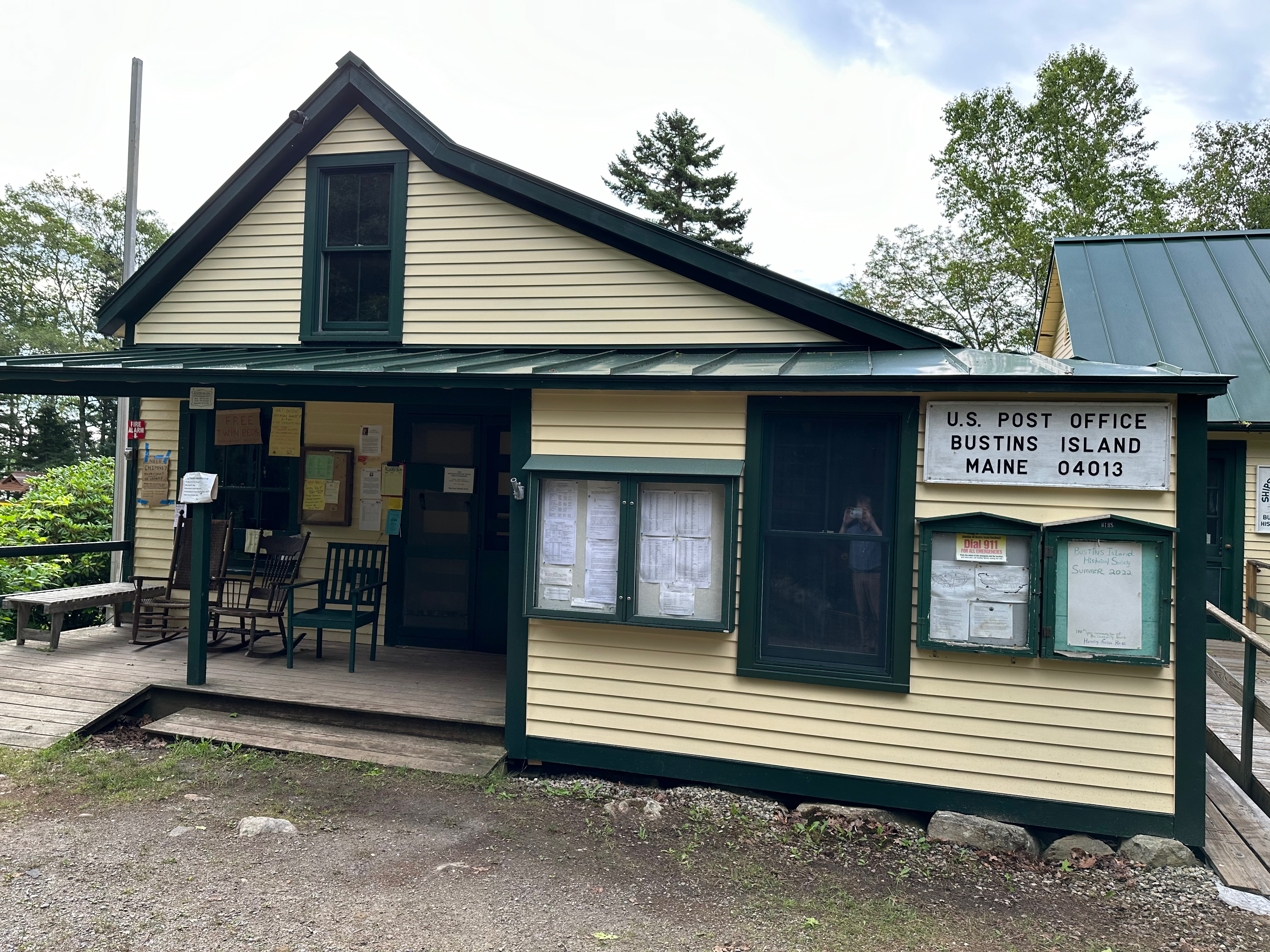
The island's post office in 2023

The Store is located on Bustins Island Road, near the public dock. It was originally a general store that adjoined the former Ships Inn Restaurant. The two buildings are now the home of the island's post office, the library, nature center, Ships Inn museum, first-aid room and offices for the Bustins Island Village Corporation (BIVC).

=== Community House ===
Located closer to the center of the island, the Community House is the hub of many activities on the island.

=== Schoolhouse ===
Standing beside the Community House, the schoolhouse was built in 1888. Its first teacher was John Hackett, who had eleven pupils. It has been renovated by the Bustins Island Historical Society (BIHS).

=== Fire Barn ===
Also located next to the Community House, the fire barn is home to two of the island's four fire trucks, as well as its tractor and utility trailers.

=== Brewer Cottage ===
Owned by the Brewer family, the cottage is a central meeting place for the island's committees.

=== Recreation ===
The island has a six-hole golf course, on its eastern side, and tennis courts, at the island's center, behind the fire barn.

== Notable people ==
Cole Porter was a camper at the island's all-boys summer camp, run by Admiral Donald Baxter MacMillan, the former arctic explorer.

== Bibliography ==
- History of Bustins Island, Casco Bay, 1660–1960, George B. Richardson (1960)

== See also ==
- List of islands of Maine
