= South Freeport, Maine =

- Village
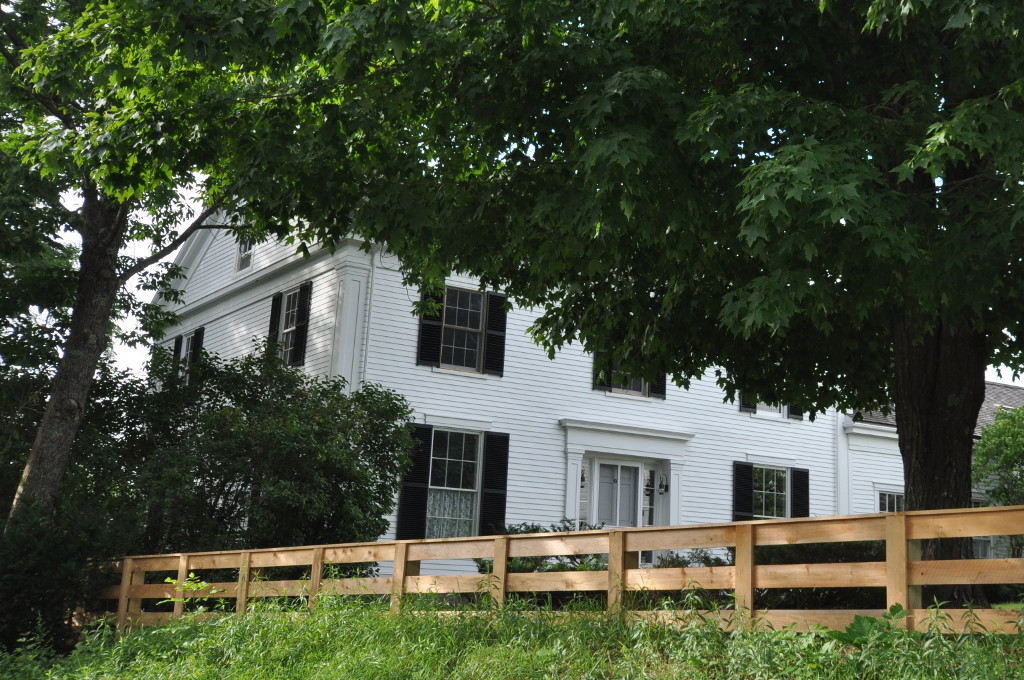
- A house in South Freeport

- Location within Maine
- Coordinates: 43°49′11″N 70°06′34″W
- Country: United States
- State: Maine
- County: Cumberland
- Elevation: 82 ft (25 m)
- Time zone: UTC-5 (Eastern (EST))
  - Summer (DST): UTC-4 (EDT)
- ZIP code: 04078
- Area code: 207
- GNIS feature ID: 575840

South Freeport is an unincorporated village in the town of Freeport, Cumberland County, Maine, United States. The community is located on Casco Bay, 2.6 miles (4.2 km) south of the village of Freeport. South Freeport has a post office, with ZIP code 04078.

South Freeport, the largest of Freeport's waterfront villages, once had four shipyards. Other businesses included fishing, canning and farming. In 1903, the Casco Castle and Amusement Park was built here by Amos F. Gerald of Fairfield to encourage travel by trolley cars. The grounds featured a hotel and restaurant, a picnic area, a baseball field, and a small zoo. The hotel burned in 1914, but its stone tower was spared in the blaze. It stands today on private property. The best place to view the tower is from nearby Winslow Park.
