= Commonwealth Shakespeare Company =

Theater company in Boston, MA, USA (formed 1996)

Commonwealth Shakespeare Company (CSC) was formed in 1996 by artistic director Steven Maler and associate Joan Moynagh to bring free, outdoor Shakespeare to the people of the city of Boston. Since 1996, CSC has produced one full Shakespeare production each summer starting with A Midsummer Night's Dream in 1996 at Copley Square. All subsequent productions have taken place in Boston Common, first at the Parkman Bandstand and now at the Parade Ground. In addition to the annual Boston Common productions, CSC presents several free play-reading events during the year: Theatre in the Rough, Shakespeare and Law, as well as Shakespeare and Leadership. CSC has actor-training programs for both high school students and pre-professional actors with its Summer Academy. Throughout the year, CSC partners with area high schools and Boys & Girls Clubs to provide in and after-school theater activities to inner-city youth. In 2013, CSC became the theatre in residence at Babson College.

== Mainstage productions ==
- A Midsummer Night's Dream (1996) - CSC's first production, took place at Copley Square, in collaboration with the city of Boston
- Romeo and Juliet (1997) - first production at the Parkman Bandstand in Boston Common
- As You Like It (1998)
- Julius Caesar (1999) - performed for the 400th anniversary of the writing of Julius Caesar to over 30,000 patrons
- The Tempest (2000) - nearly half of scheduled performances were cancelled, due to rain
- Twelfth Night (2001) - performed to over 45,000 patrons; earned Elliot Norton Award for Best Production
- Henry V (2002) - set in a London Tube station during World War II; starred Anthony Rapp
- Macbeth (2003) - starred Jay O. Sanders
- Much Ado About Nothing (2004) - performed to over 85,000 patrons
- Hamlet (2005) - performed to over 90,000 patrons
- The Taming of the Shrew (2006) - set in the historic North End, Boston, Massachusetts
- A Midsummer Night's Dream (2007)
- As You Like It (2008) - starred Fred Weller & Marin Ireland
- The Comedy of Errors (2009)
- Othello (2010)
- All's Well That Ends Well (2011)
- Coriolanus (2012)
- Two Gentlemen of Verona (2013)
- Twelfth Night (2014)
- King Lear (2015) starring Will Lyman
- Love's Labour's Lost (2016)
- Romeo and Juliet (2017) directed by Allegra Libonati
- Richard III (2018) starring Faran Tahir
- Cymbeline (2019) directed by Fred Sullivan Jr
- The Tempest (2021) directed by Steve Maler
- Much Ado About Nothing (2022) directed by Megan Sandberg-Zakian
- Macbeth (2023) directed by Steve Maler and starring Faran Tahir and Joanne Kelly
- The Winter's Tale (2024) directed by Bryn Boice
- As You Like It (2025)

== Other productions ==
Shakespeare at Fenway (2014) - the first live theatre at Fenway Park featuring local and national actors

Happy Days (2014) - starring Brooke Adams and Tony Shalhoub

Our American Hamlet (2017)

== Apprentice Program ==
The CSC Apprentice Program is an intensive summer training program for young professionals who are pursuing a career in theatre. Apprentices are given understudy roles for mainstage productions, plus their own production of one of Shakespeare's plays.
