= Freedom Rally =

Annual event

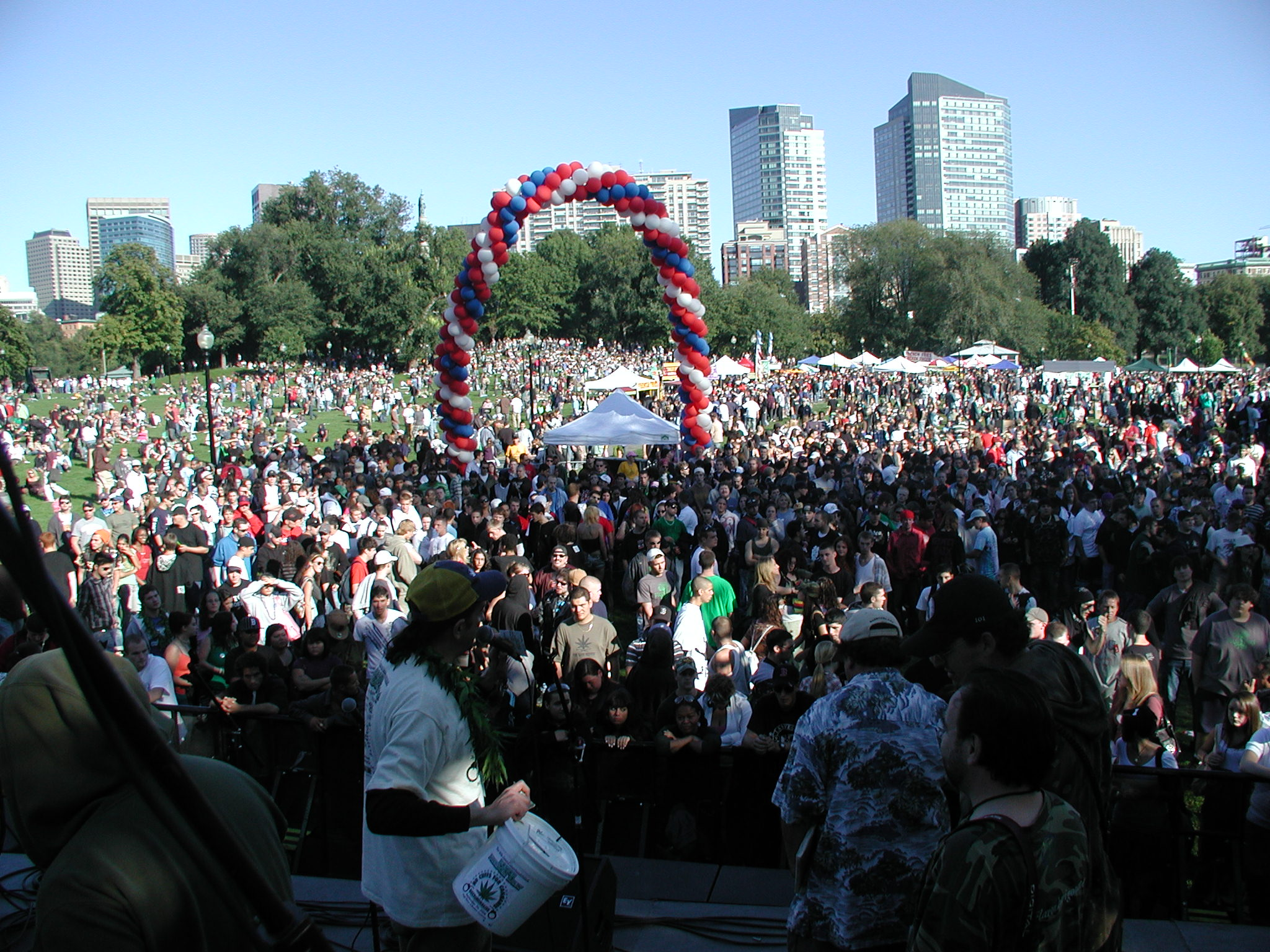
Mass Cann/NORML's Freedom Rally 2008

The Boston Freedom Rally (often confused with Seattle's Hempfest) is an annual event in Boston, in the U.S. state of Massachusetts. Held on the third Saturday in September, it is traditionally the second largest annual gathering demanding marijuana law reform in the United States, after the Seattle Hempfest. After achieving the original goal of legalising marijuana recreational ("adult-use" pursuant to the Massachusetts regulatory scheme) use in the state of Massachusetts in 2016, the rally is seen as a celebration of the change to the state's legal policy toward cannabis, a chance to educate the community, and an opportunity to keep marijuana-related issues in the public forum as the state continues to mold its marijuana regulatory and legislative framework. Some attendees also view it as a rally to lessen the restriction on public consumption of marijuana, with public consumption still banned, and violations leading to a US$100 civil fine. It is organized by the Massachusetts Cannabis Reform Coalition, Inc. (MassCann / www.masscann.org), the state's longest-standing marijuana advocacy group.

== History ==
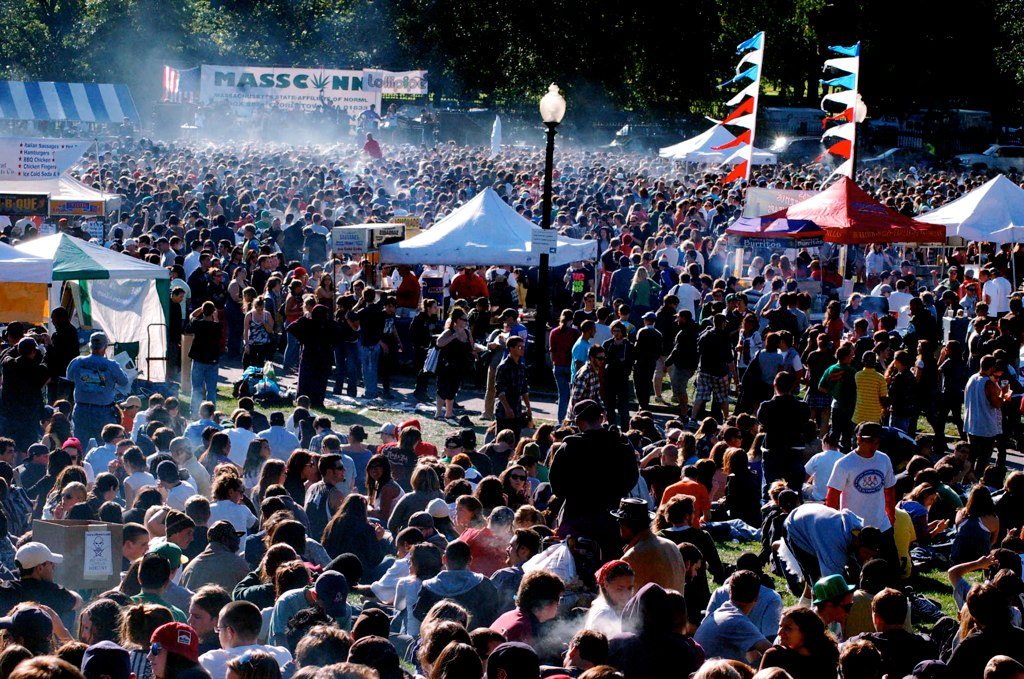
4:20 PM at Freedom Rally 2009

The first Freedom Rally was held in 1989 in North Adams. The second was on the dock beside the USS Constitution. The third was held in front of the Massachusetts State House on Beacon Street and the fourth, in 1992, was held on Boston Common at the Parkman Bandstand. In 1995, the Freedom Rally moved to its current location across the Common on the Carty Parade Field.
