= Boston Common =

Public park in Boston, Massachusetts

Coordinates: 42°21′18″N 71°03′56″W

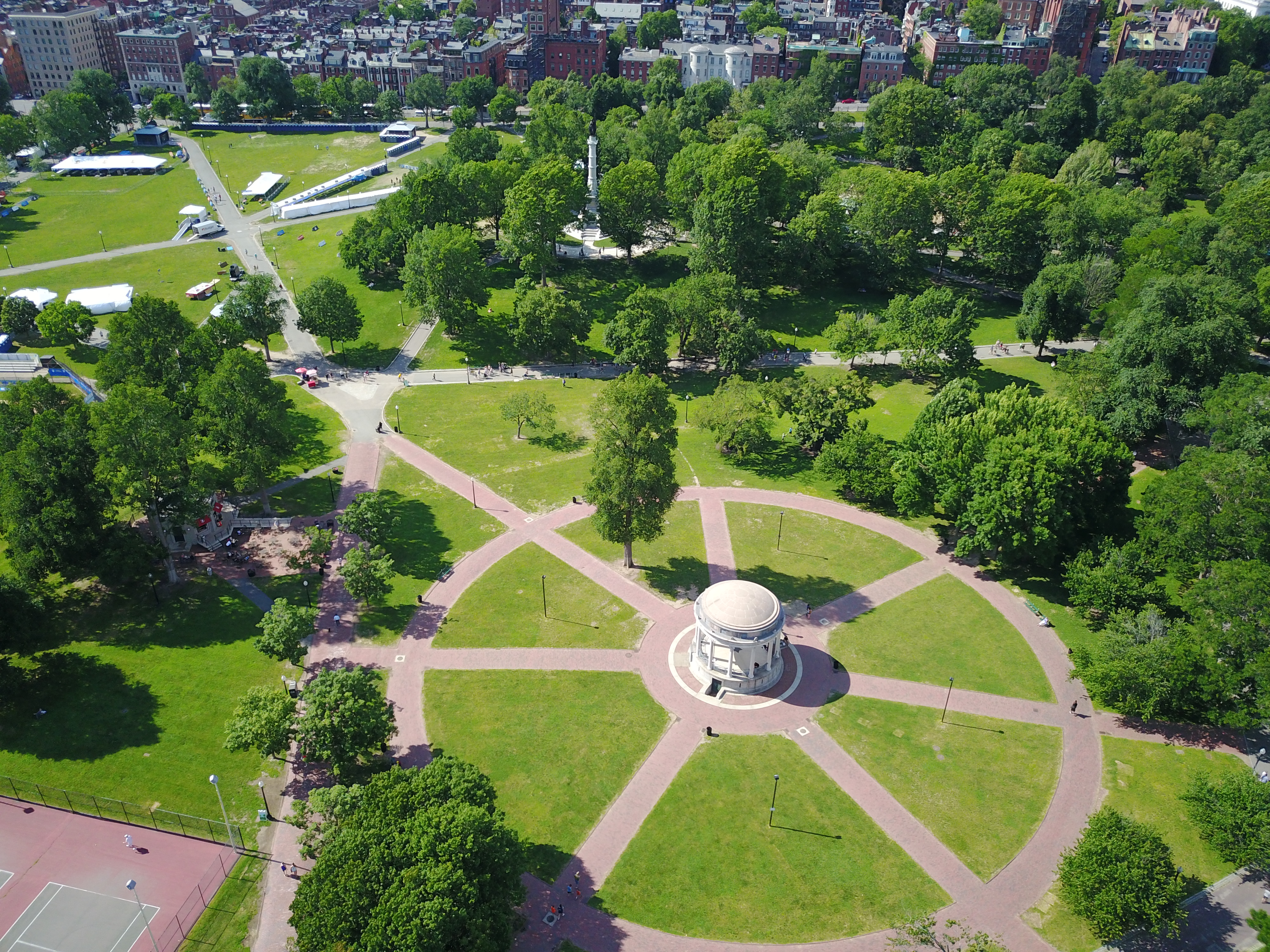
- Aerial view of Boston Common in Downtown Boston in June 2017
- Interactive map of Boston Common
- Type: Public park
- Location: Boston, Massachusetts, U.S.
- Area: 50 acres (200,000 m^{2})
- Opened: 1634; 392 years ago
- Designer: Multiple, including Augustus St. Gaudens
- Boston Common
- U.S. National Register of Historic Places
- U.S. National Historic Landmark District
- Boston Landmark
- NRHP reference No.: 72000144 (original); 87000760 (new)

Significant dates
- Added to NRHP: July 12, 1972 (original, in NRHP also including Boston Public Garden); February 27, 1987 (new, in NHL of Boston Common alone)
- Designated NHLD: February 27, 1987
- Designated BOSL: May 10, 1977

The Boston Common is a public park in downtown Boston, Massachusetts. It is the oldest city park in the United States. Boston Common covers 50 acres (20 ha) bounded by five major Boston streets: Tremont Street, Park Street, Beacon Street, Charles Street, and Boylston Street.

The Common is part of the Emerald Necklace of parks and parkways that extend south to Franklin Park in Jamaica Plain, Roxbury, and Dorchester. Immediately to the west is Boston Public Garden. The visitor center for the city of Boston is located on the Tremont Street side of the park.

The Central Burying Ground is on the Boylston Street side of Boston Common and contains the graves of artist Gilbert Stuart and composer William Billings. Also buried there are Samuel Sprague and his son, Charles Sprague, one of America's earliest poets. Samuel Sprague was a participant in the Boston Tea Party and fought in the Revolutionary War. The Common was designated as a Boston Landmark by the Boston Landmarks Commission in 1977.

The Common is sometimes erroneously referred to as the "Boston Commons."

== History ==
=== 17th century ===
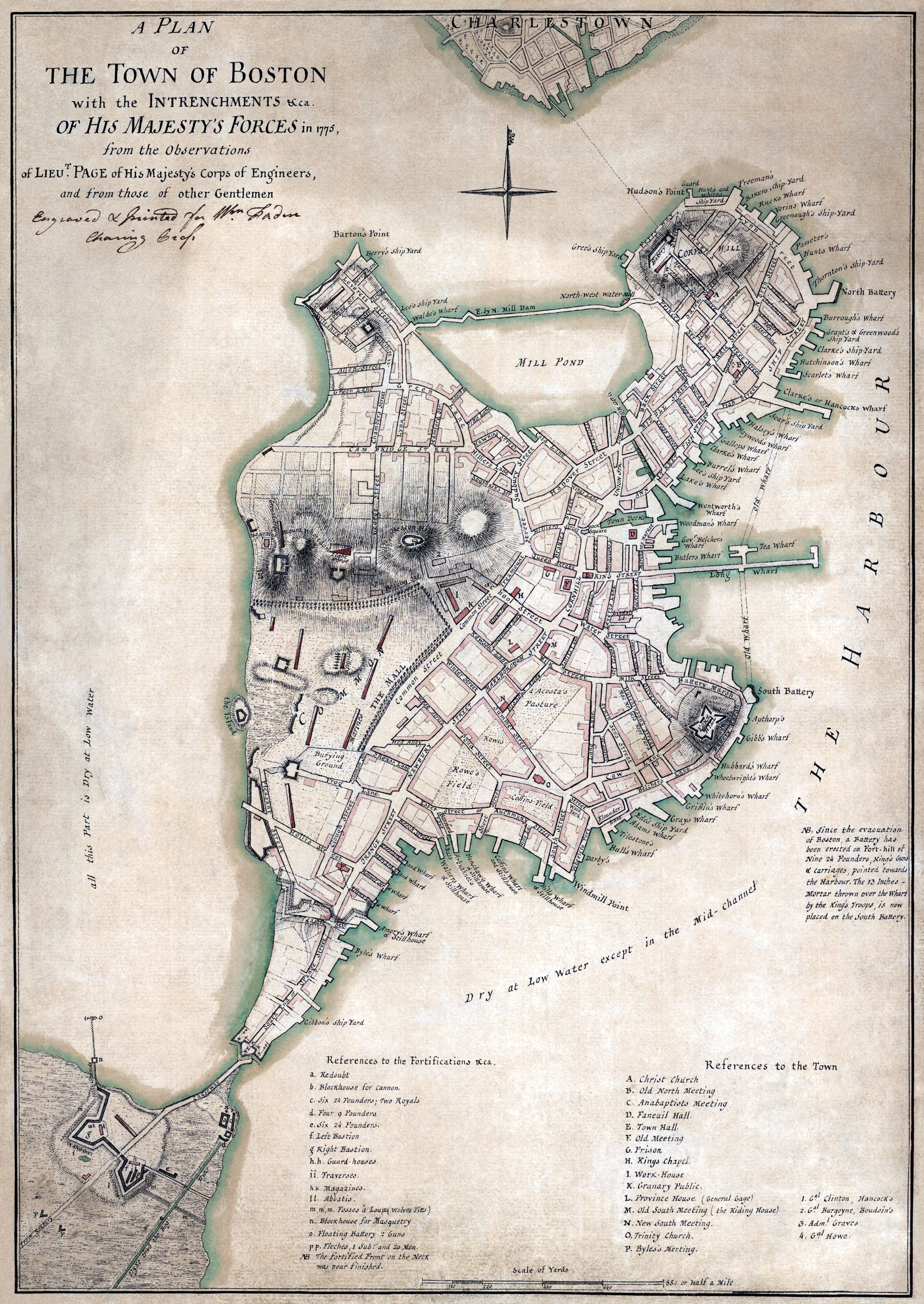
Boston Common identified at the western edge of this 1775 British artillery survey of the city with Boston Neck visible at roughly at 7 o'clock.

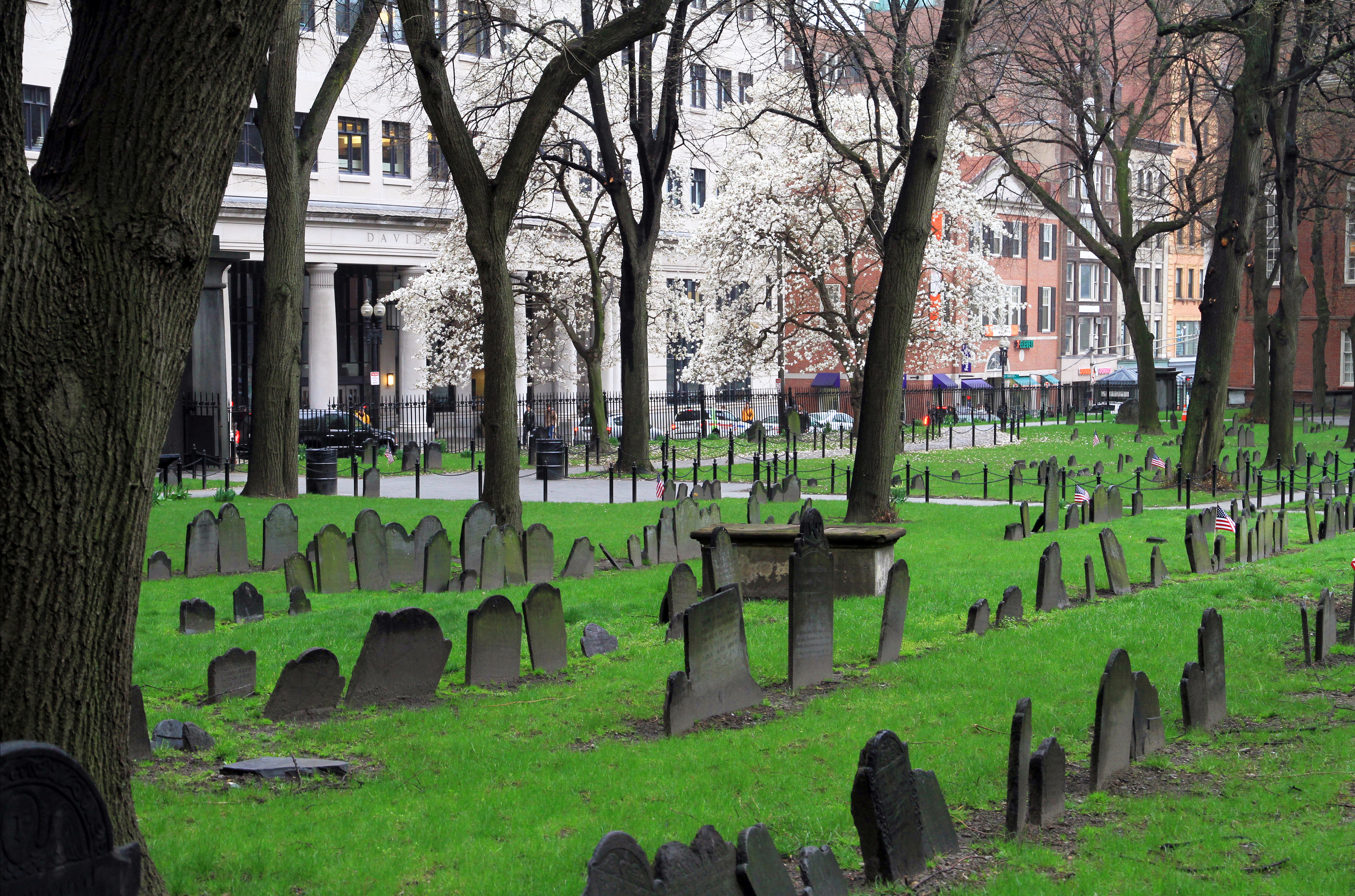
Granary Burying Ground near Boston Common

William Blaxton was the first European owner of the land. He arrived in the Massachusetts Bay Colony as chaplain to the Robert Gorges expedition that landed in Weymouth in 1623. All other member of this colonization attempt returned to England before the winter of 1625. Blaxton migrated five miles north to the Shawmut Peninsula, then a rocky bulge at the end of a swampy isthmus surrounded on all sides by mudflats. Blaxton lived entirely alone for five years on the peninsula that became Boston.

In 1630, Blaxton wrote a decisive letter to the Puritan group led by Isaac Johnson, whose colony of Charlestown was then failing from lack of fresh water. Blaxton advertised the excellent natural springs of the peninsula and invited Johnson's group to settle with him on it, which they did on September 7, 1630. Johnson died less than three weeks later and Blaxton negotiated a grant of 50 acres around his home on the western edge of the peninsula from Governor John Winthrop. This amounted to approximately 10 percent of the available land on the Shawmut Peninsula, stretching from Beacon Hill to Boylston Street.

One of Johnson's last official acts as the leader of the Charlestown community was to name the new settlement across the Charles River after his original home in Lincolnshire, England. He had immigrated to Massachusetts Bay Colony with his wife, Arbella, and John Cotton, grandfather of Cotton Mather, during the Puritan Migration.

However, Blaxton quickly tired of his Puritan neighbors and the difficulty of retaining such a large plot of land in a town that had grown to nearly 4,000 people by 1633. This led him to sell all but six of his 50 acres back to Winthrop in 1634 for £30 ($5,455 adjusted). The governor purchased the land through a one-time tax on residents amounting to 6 shillings per person (approximately $50 in adjusted value). Those 44 acres became the town commons of Boston and today form the bulk of Boston Common.

During the 1630s, the Common was used by many families as a cow pasture. This traditional use of the commons quickly ended when the large herds kept by affluent families led to overgrazing and the collapse of the Common as pastureland. In 1646, grazing was limited to 70 cows at a time. The Common continued to host cows until they were formally banned in 1830 by Mayor Harrison Gray Otis.

The Granary Burying Ground, located at the southern edge of the Common, was established in 1660. Two years later, part of this land was separated from the Common, with the southwest portion used for public buildings—including a granary and jail—and the north portion dedicated to an almshouse (probably the first in the Thirteen Colonies).

Boston Common took over from the gibbet outside the gate of Boston Neck as the town execution ground and was used for public hangings until 1817. Most of these executions were carried out from the limb of a large oak, which was replaced with a gallows in 1769. Those executed included common criminals, military deserters, Indians, captured pirates, and religious dissidents. The most famous victims of the Common's era as an execution ground were the group of Quakers known almost immediately after their deaths as the Boston Martyrs. The most famous of the Boston Martyrs was Mary Dyer, who was executed on June 1, 1660. She was hanged from the oak by the Puritan government of Boston for repeatedly defying a law that banned Quakers from the Massachusetts Bay Colony.

=== 18th century ===
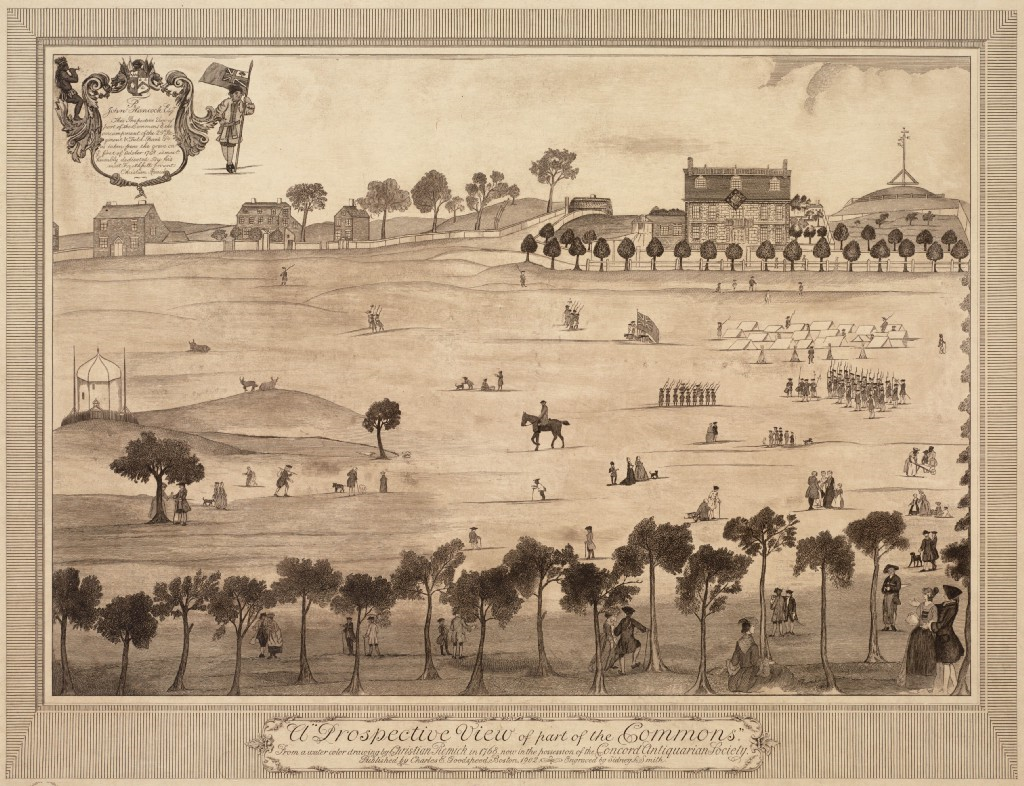
John Hancock's house across from the Boston Common in 1768

The Common's status as a civic property led to its use as a public speaking ground, frequently used by evangelists such as George Whitefield.

On May 19, 1713, 200 citizens rioted on the Common in the Boston Bread Riot in reaction to a serious food shortage in the city. They later attacked the ships and warehouses of wealthy merchant Andrew Belcher who was exporting grain to the British West Indies for higher profits. The lieutenant governor was shot during the riot.

The Common was used as a military camp by the British before the American Revolutionary War, and it was from the Common that British troops set off for the Battle of Lexington and Concord.

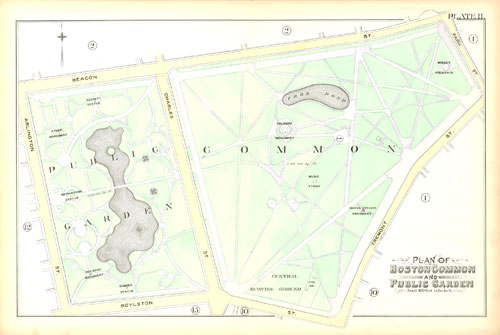
An 1890 map of Boston Common and the adjacent public garden

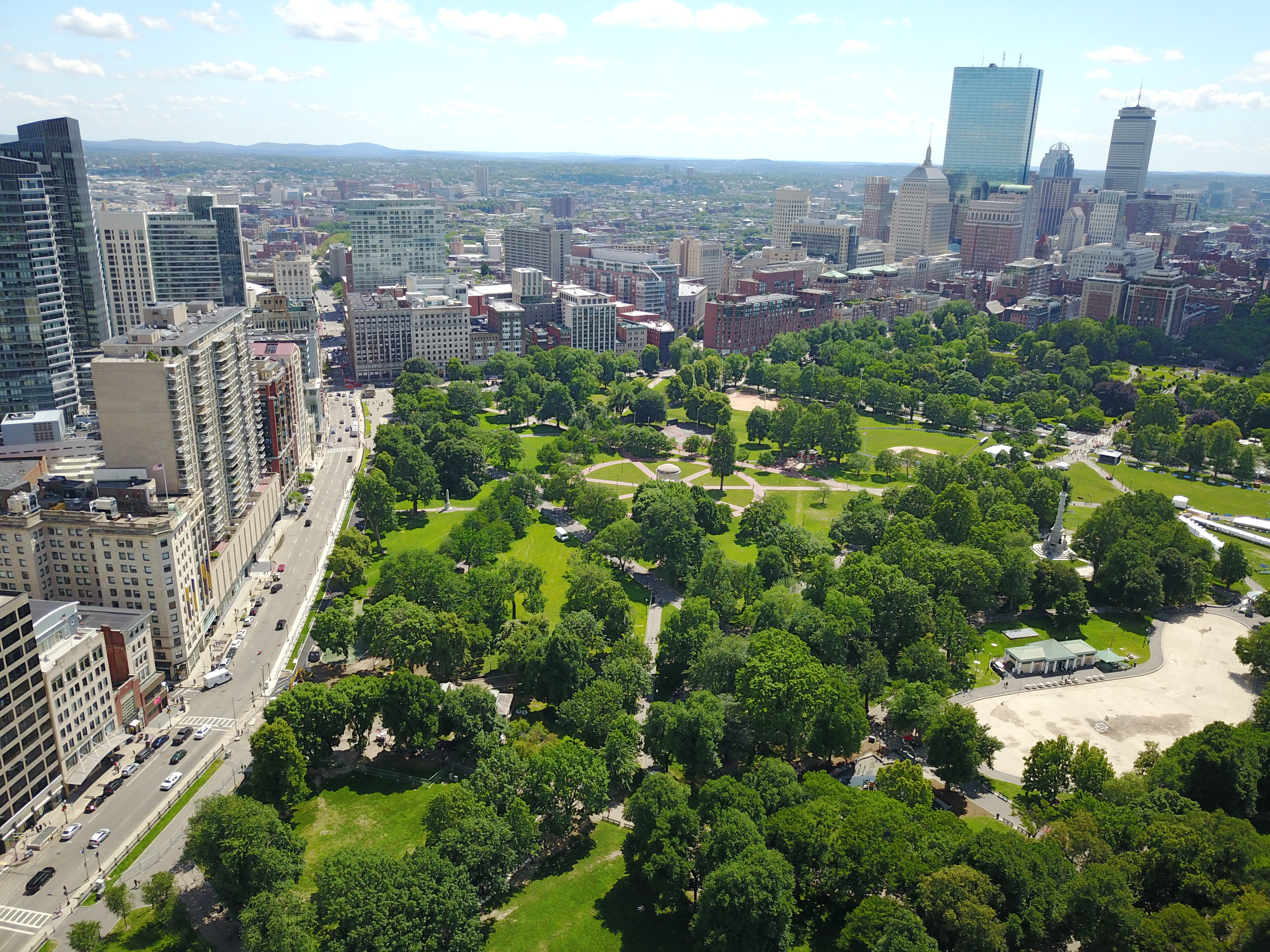
An aerial view of Boston Common

Fireworks displays over Boston Common began as early as July 3, 1745, in celebration of the fall of Louisbourg. These were followed by the celebration of the repeal of the Stamp Act on May 19, 1766, and the first anniversary of the signing of the Declaration of Independence on July 4, 1777, when Son of Liberty "Colonel Crafts illuminated his park on the Common" with fireworks, according to the Pennsylvania Evening Post of July 24, 1777. True park status seems to have emerged no later than 1830, when the grazing of cows was ended and renaming the Common as Washington Park was proposed.

=== 19th century ===
The renaming of the bordering Sentry Street to Park Place, later called Park Street, in 1804 already acknowledged the reality. By 1836, an ornamental iron fence fully enclosed the Common and its five perimeter malls, or recreational promenade. Tremont Mall, modeled after St. James's Park in London, had been in place since 1728.

The Common was used for a variety of purposes until its formal conversion into a public park during the 1830s. These uses gradually became more urban as the city developed, shifting from pastureland to military drilling field, execution grounds, public gathering place, and finally parkland.

The park was originally "off-limits" to Black and Indigenous people, a restriction the Black community in Boston actively resisted until it was lifted on July 4, 1836.

The Charles Street side of Boston Common, along with the adjacent sections of the Public Garden, was initially used as an unofficial dumping ground, as these areas were the lowest-lying parts of the two parks. This left the area "a moist stew that reeked and was a mess to walk over," deterring visitors—yet the cost of repair delayed any improvements. This finally changed in the summer of 1895, when the required quantity of soil was made available as a result of the excavation of the Tremont Street subway which was used to regrade the Charles Street sides of Boston Common and the Public Garden.

=== 20th century ===
A hundred people gathered on the Common in early 1965 to protest the Vietnam War. A second protest happened on October 15, 1969, this time with 100,000 people protesting in the Moratorium to End the War in Vietnam.

Boston Common was added to the National Register of Historic Places in 1972 along with the adjacent Boston Public Garden. The Common was declared a National Historic Landmark in 1987 with its own listing on the National Register.

Boston Common is managed by the Boston Park Department and cared for by Friends of the Public Garden, a private advocacy group which also provides additional funding for maintenance and special events.

== Notable features ==
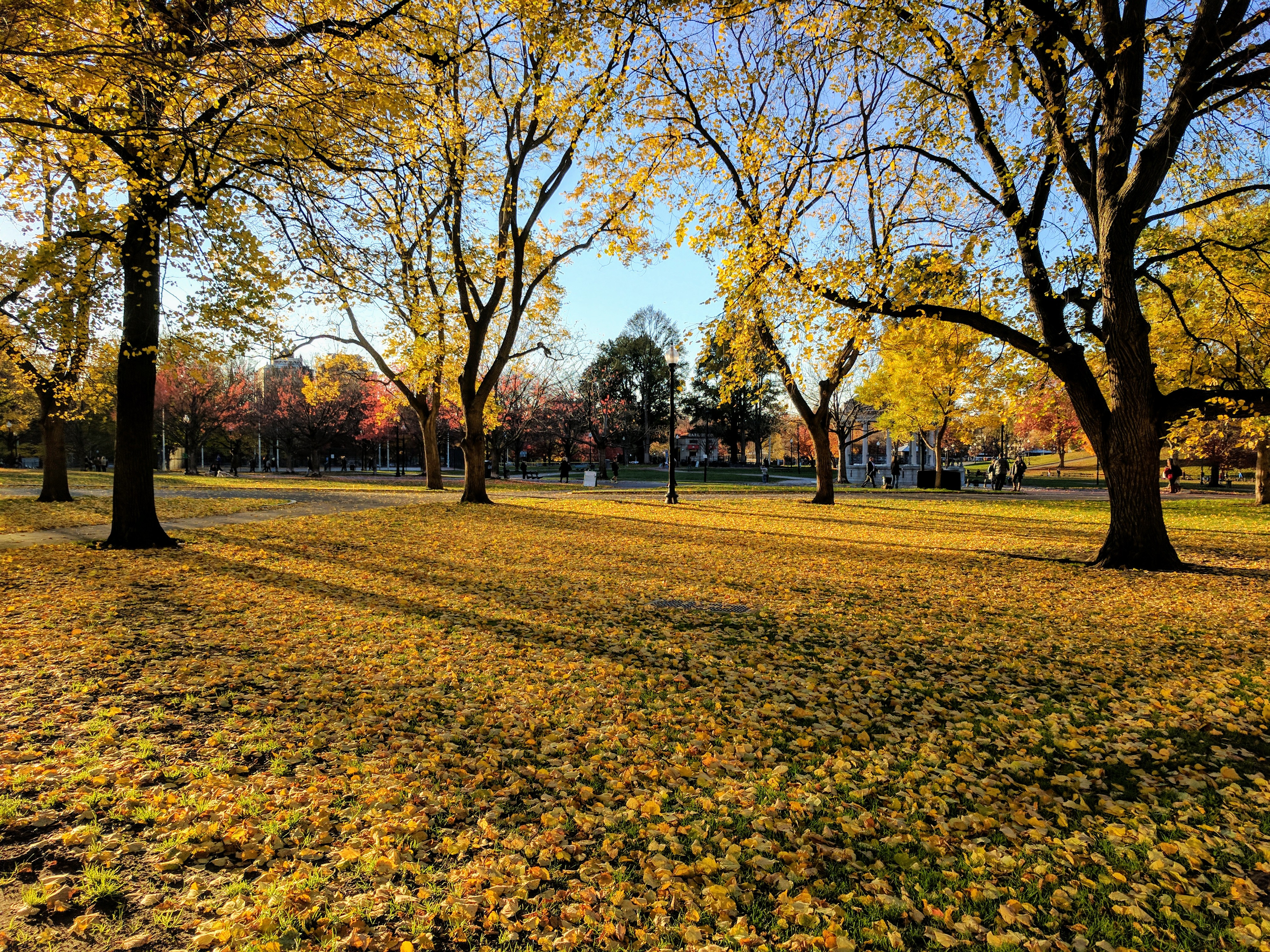
Boston Common in the fall of 2016

The Boston Common Frog Pond sits at the heart of the Common and is managed by the Skating Club of Boston in partnership with the City of Boston. The Frog Pond is home to a winter ice skating rink and learn-to-skate school, a reflecting pool in the spring and fall, and a summer spray pool and children's carousel.

The softball fields lie in the southwest corner of the Common. A grassy area forms the western part of the park and is most commonly used for the park's largest events. A parking garage lies under this part of the Common. There, a granite slab commemorates Pope John Paul II's October 1, 1979 visit to Boston, during which the Pope said Mass to approximately 400,000 people.

In 1913 and 1986, prehistoric sites were discovered on the Common indicating American Indian presence long before it was colonized.

Since 1971, the Province of Nova Scotia has donated the annual Christmas Tree to the City of Boston as an enduring thanks for the relief efforts of the Boston Red Cross and the Massachusetts Public Safety Committee following the Halifax Explosion of 1917.

Both the Common and Public Garden have been developed for recreational and aesthetic purposes: while the Common is primarily unstructured open space that facilitate social and political gatherings, the Public Garden providing a more manicured landscape for promenading.

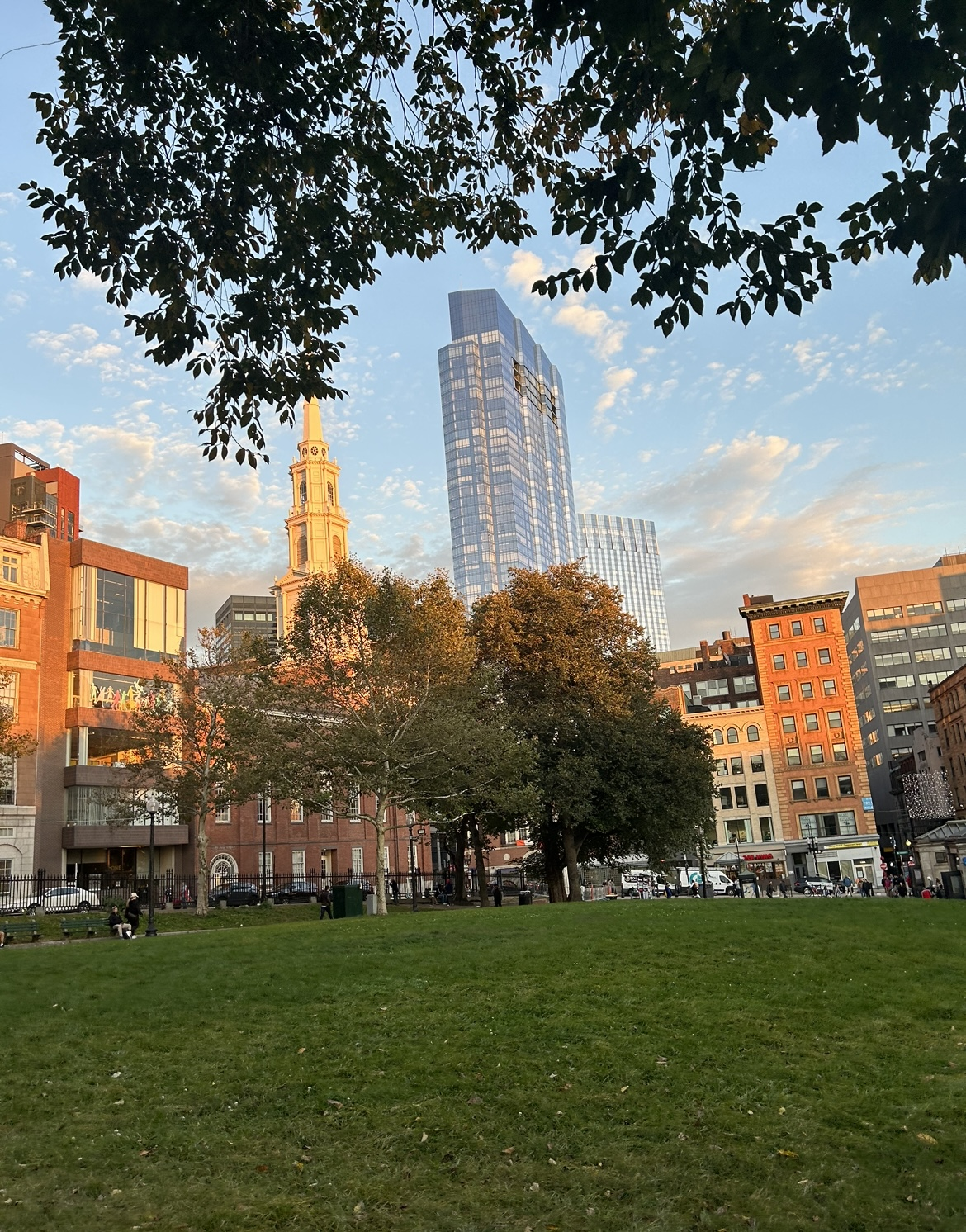
View of Boston Common and Park Street church at sunset

=== Structures ===
- The Boston Common Tablet is installed near the corner of Park Street and Tremont Street.
- Declaration of Independence Tablet, designed in 1925 by John Francis Paramino, is also installed at Boston Common.
- Plaque to the Great Elm tree which had been adorned with lanterns to represent liberty, used as a point of fortification, and used for hangings. It was destroyed in a storm in 1876.
- The Robert Gould Shaw Memorial to Robert Gould Shaw and the Black 54th Massachusetts Volunteer Infantry stands at Beacon and Park Streets, the northeast corner of the Common, opposite the State House.
- The Soldiers and Sailors Monument is a victory column on Flag Staff Hill in the Common, commemorating Civil War dead.
- The Boston Massacre Monument was dedicated November 14, 1888.
- The Oneida Football Club Monument memorializes the Common as the site of the first organized football games in the United States, played by the Oneida Football Club in 1862.
- Brewer Fountain stands near the corner of Park and Tremont Streets by Park Street Station.
- Boylston and Park Street stations were the first two subway stations in the United States; they lie underneath the southern and eastern corners of the park, respectively. Both stations have been in near-continuous operation since the opening of the first portion of the Tremont Street subway (now part of the MBTA's Green Line) on September 1, 1897.
- Parkman Bandstand is in the eastern part of the park, used in musical and theatrical productions.
- Parkman Plaza features the statues Industry, Learning, and Religion.
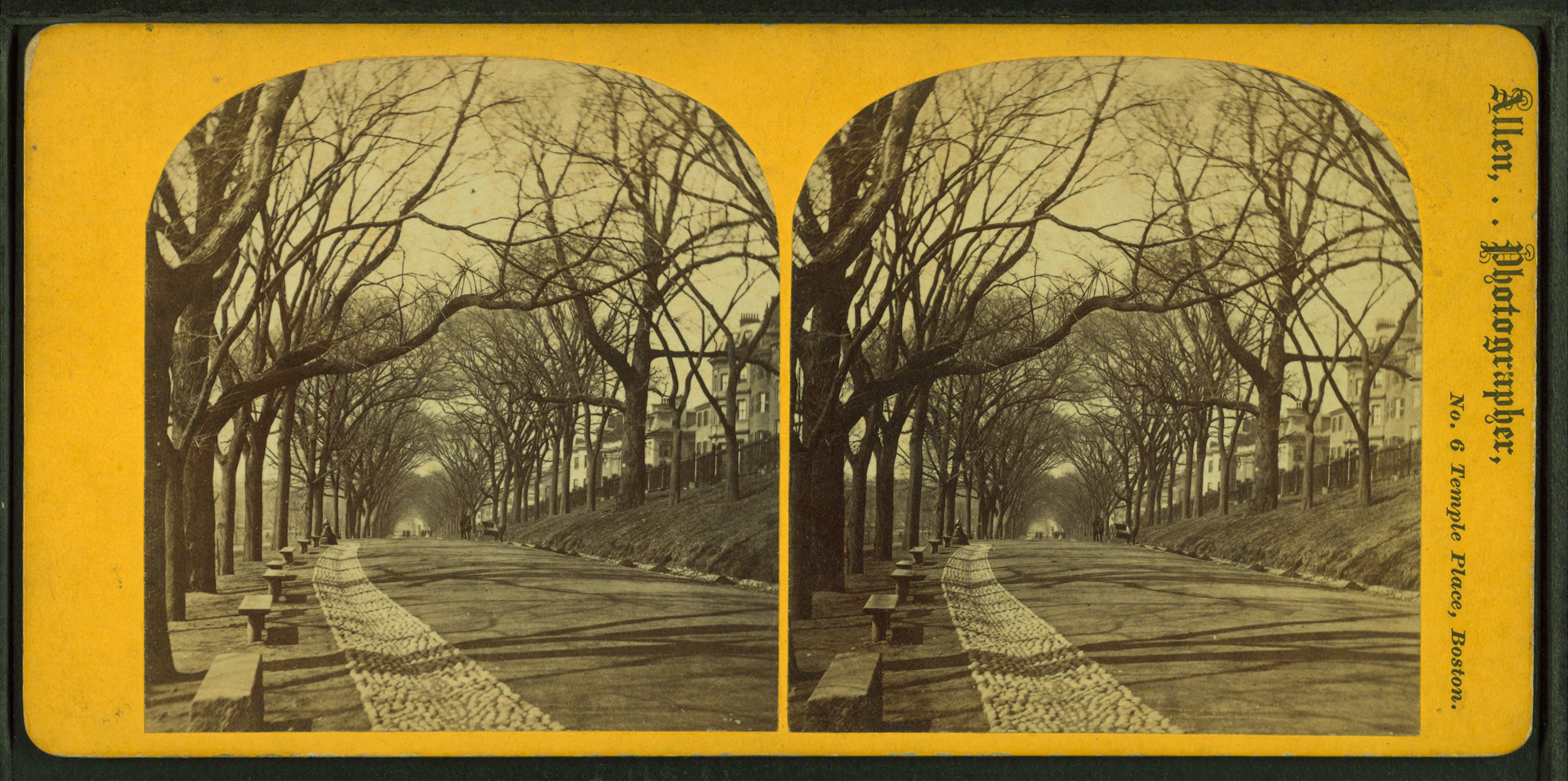
Beacon St. Mall, 19th century (photo by E.L. Allen)

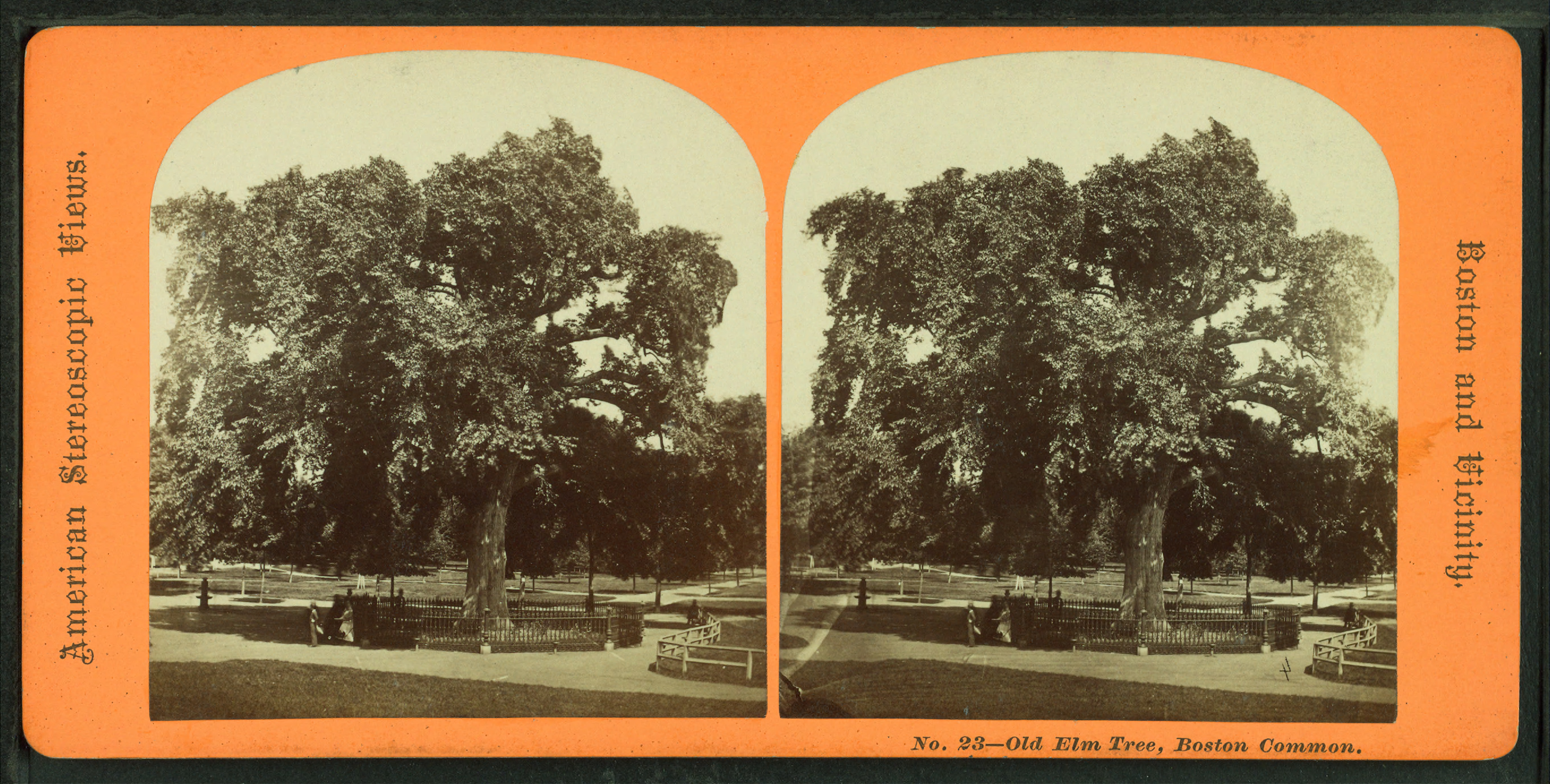
Old Elm tree, 19th century

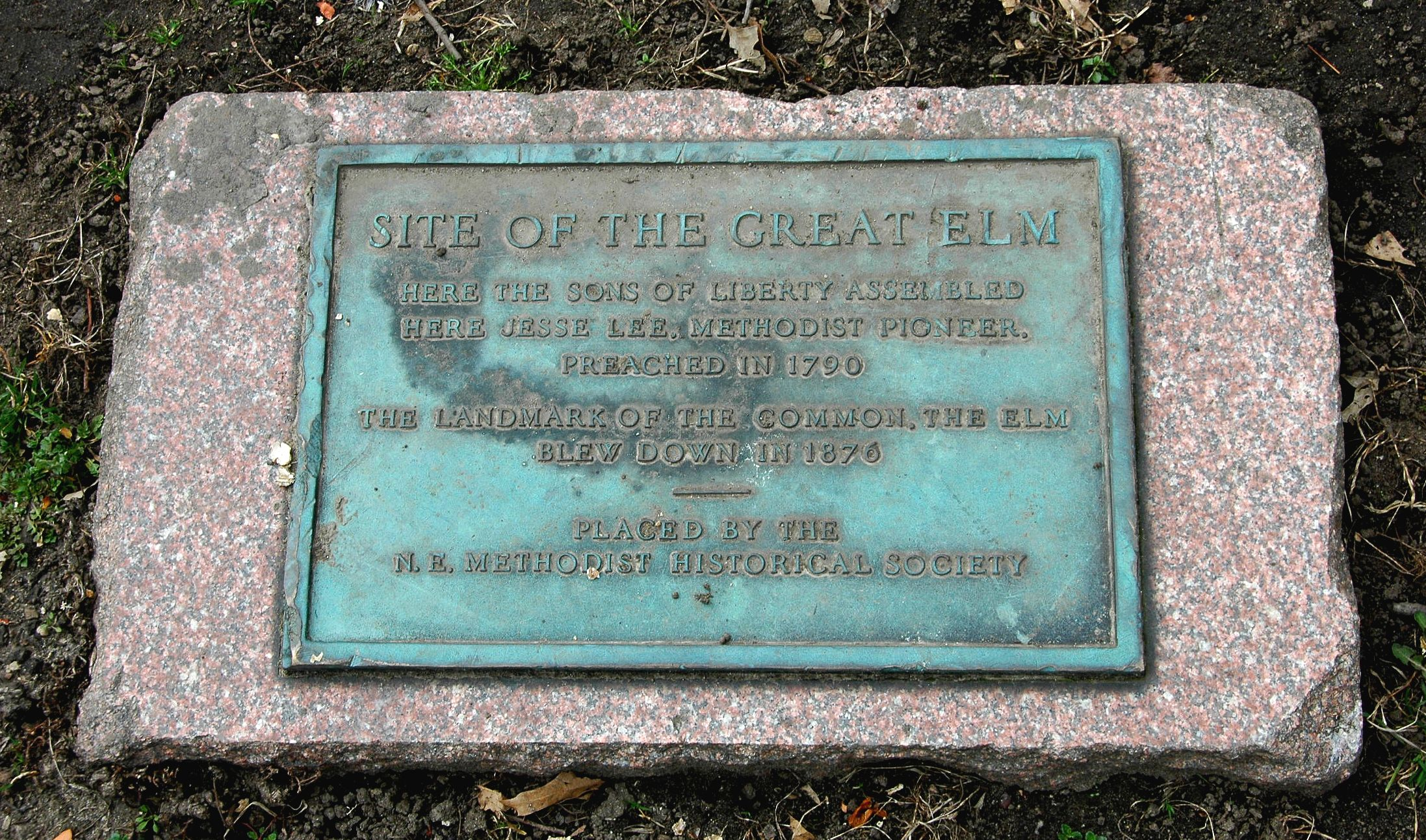
Plaque to the Great Elm tree

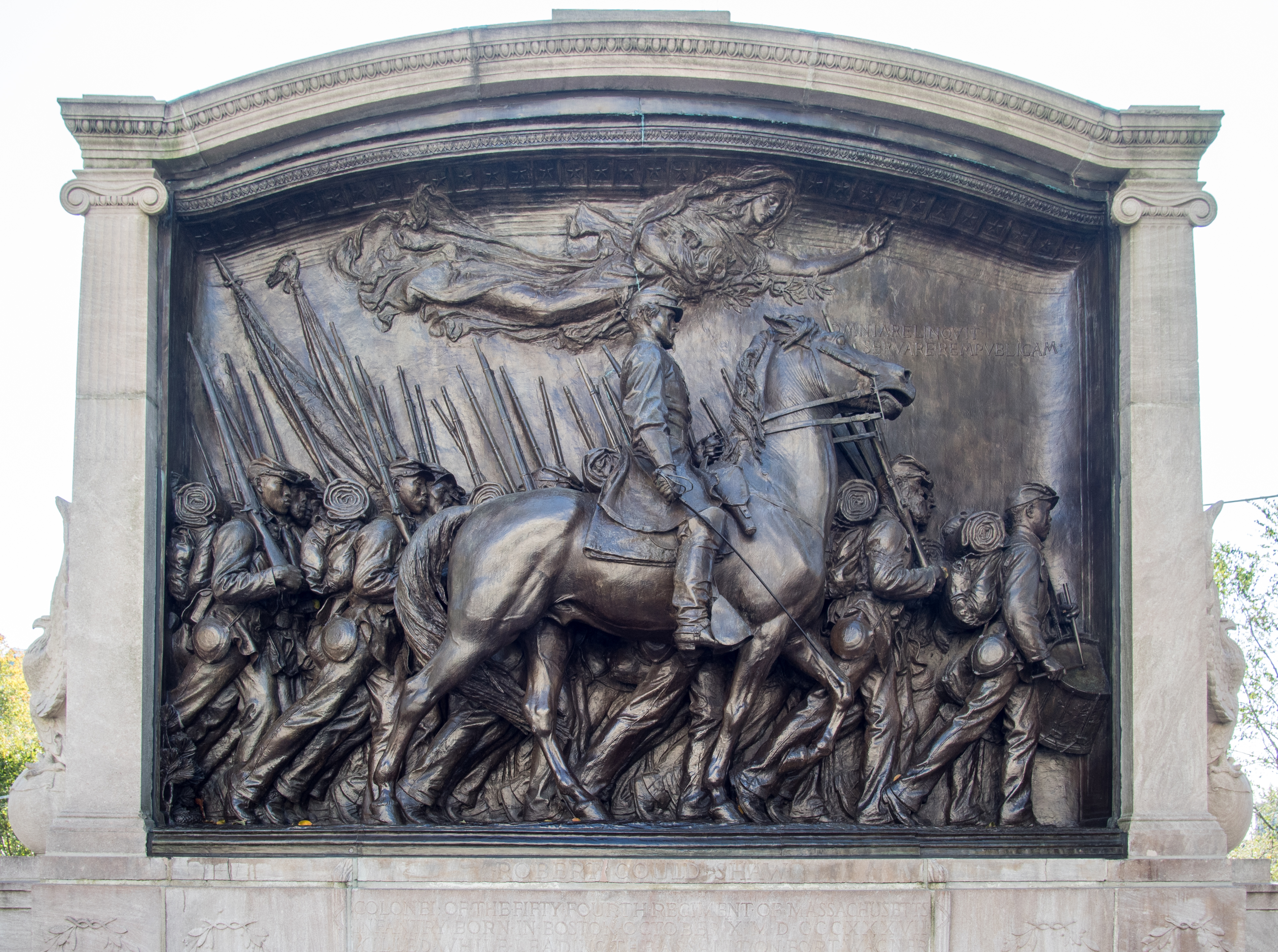
Robert Gould Shaw Memorial

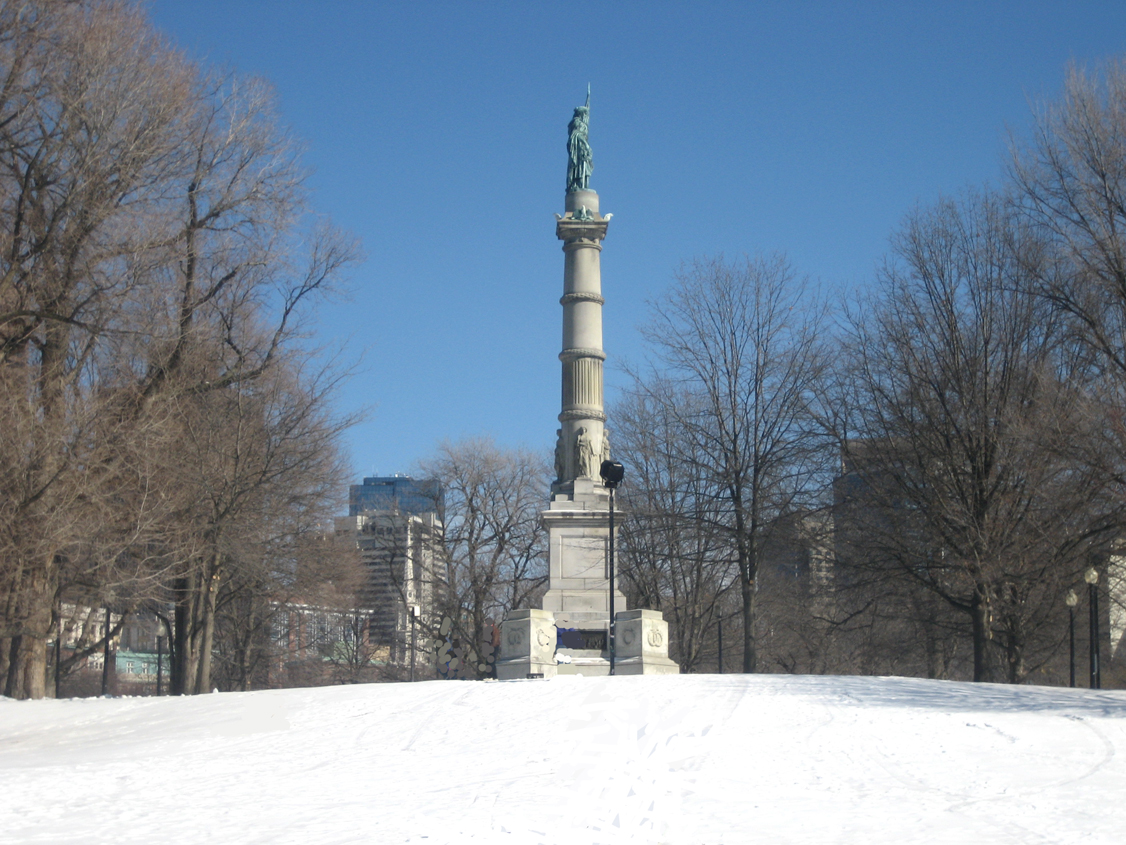
Soldiers and Sailors Monument

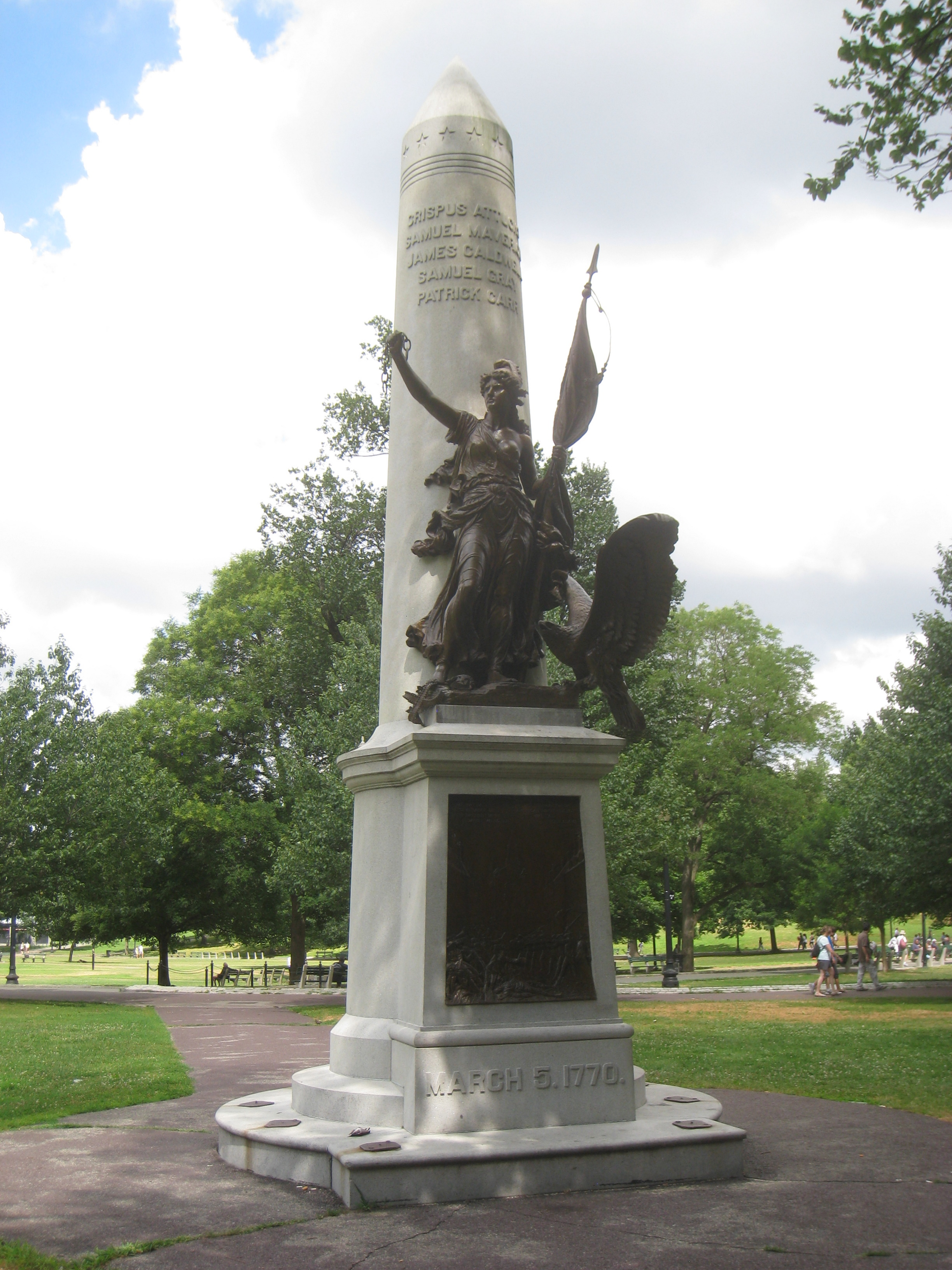
Boston Massacre Memorial

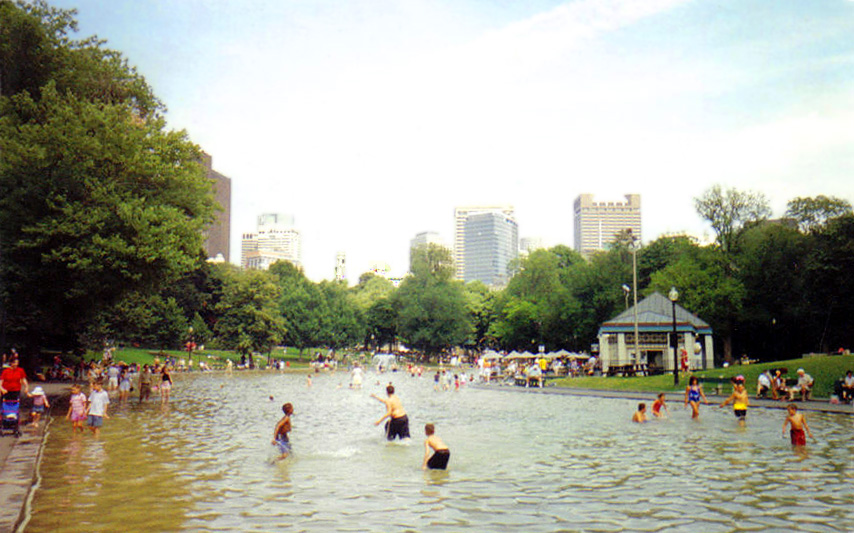
The Frog Pond

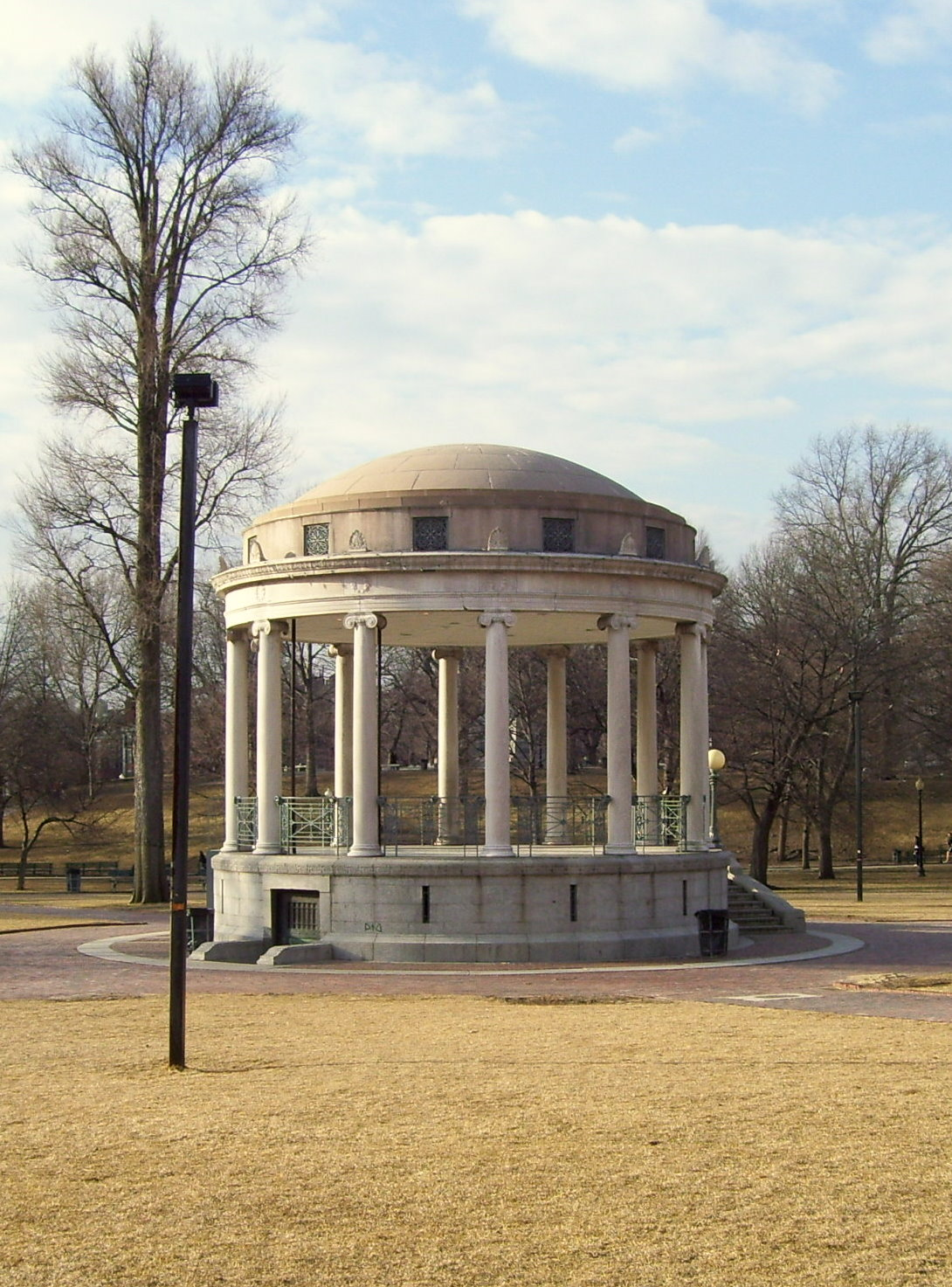
Parkman Bandstand

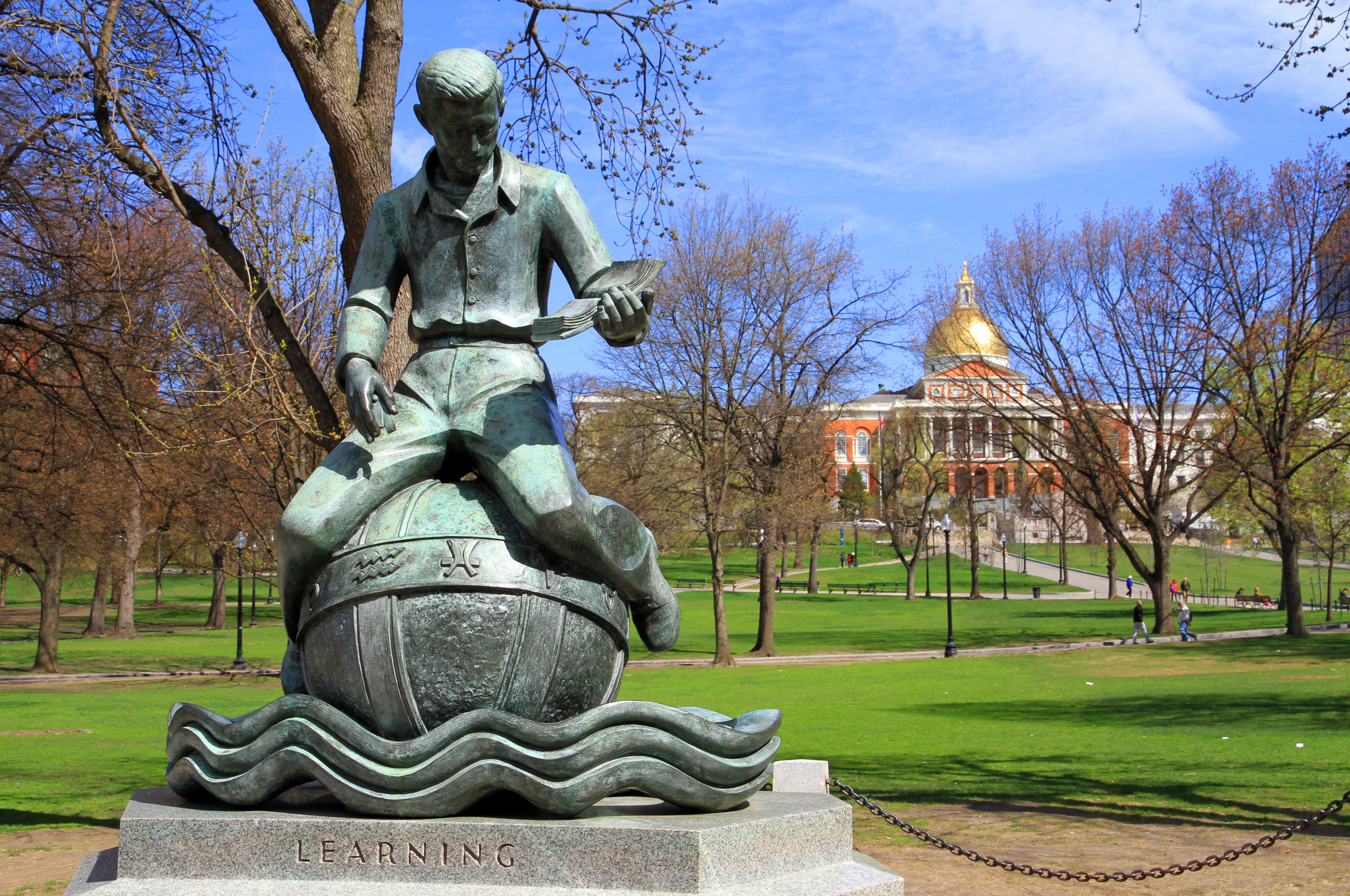
Massachusetts State House/Massachusetts Statehouse ("New" State House)

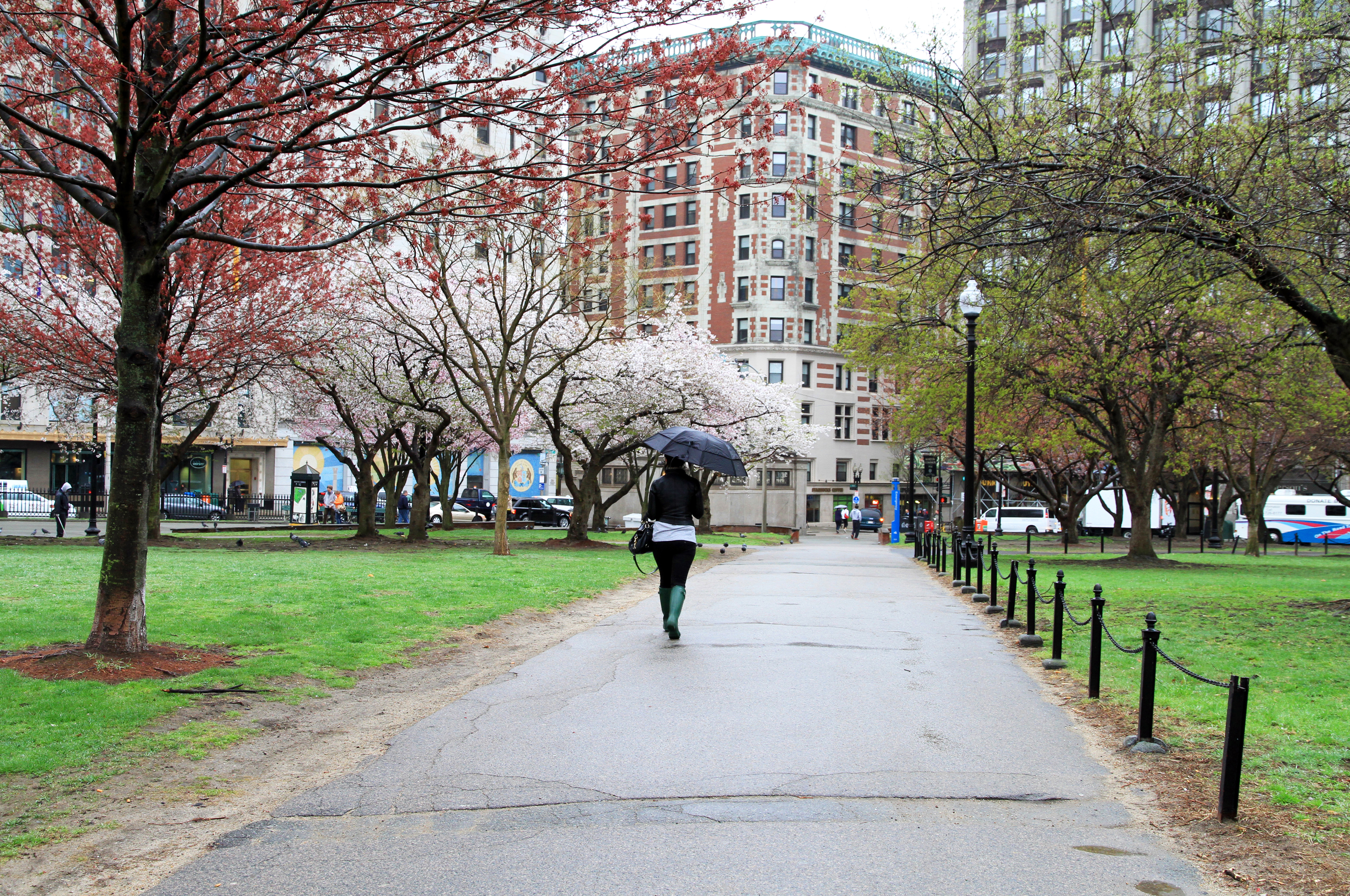
Boylston station

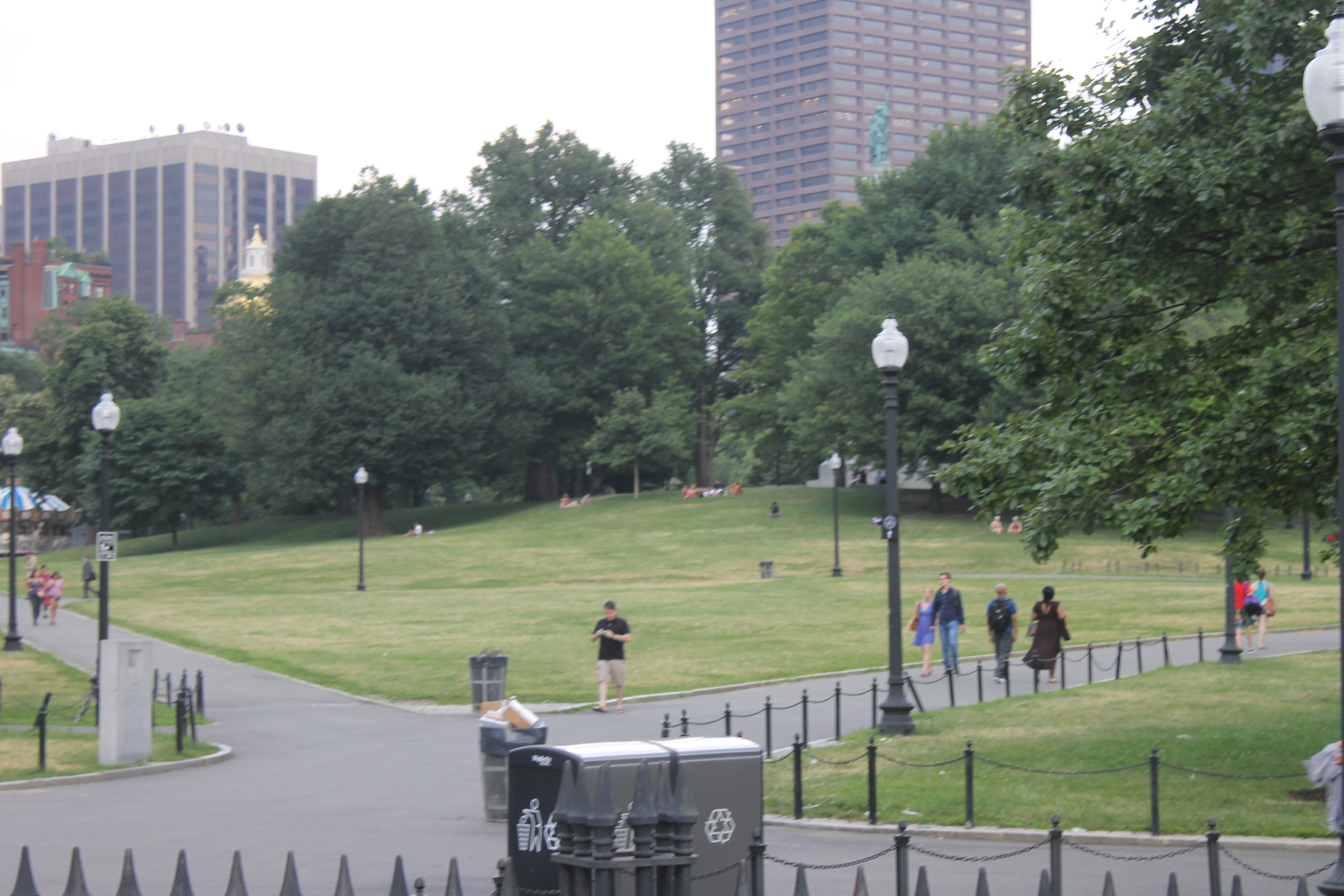
Boston Common

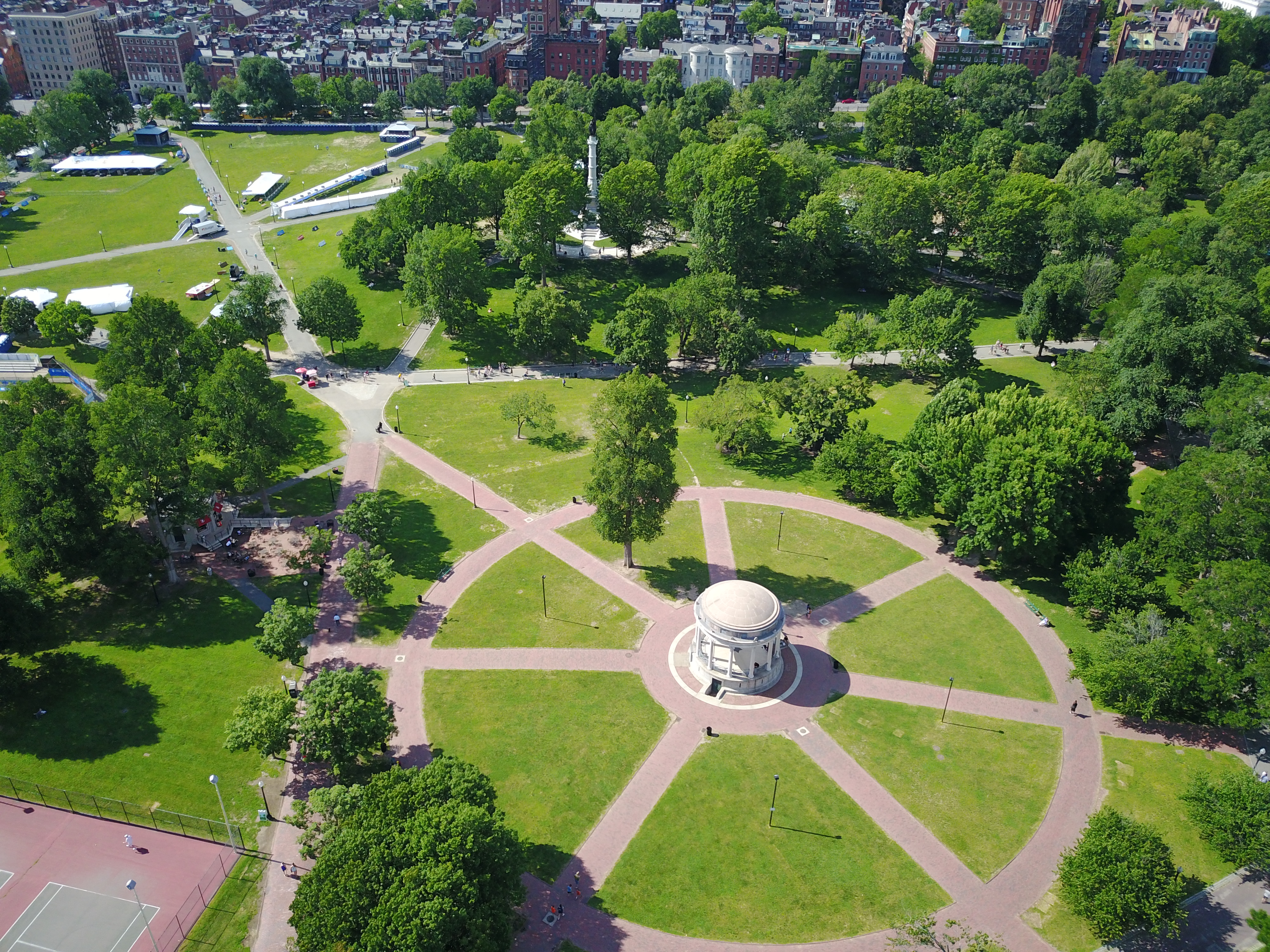
Aerial view of Parkman Bandstand

=== Neighboring structures ===
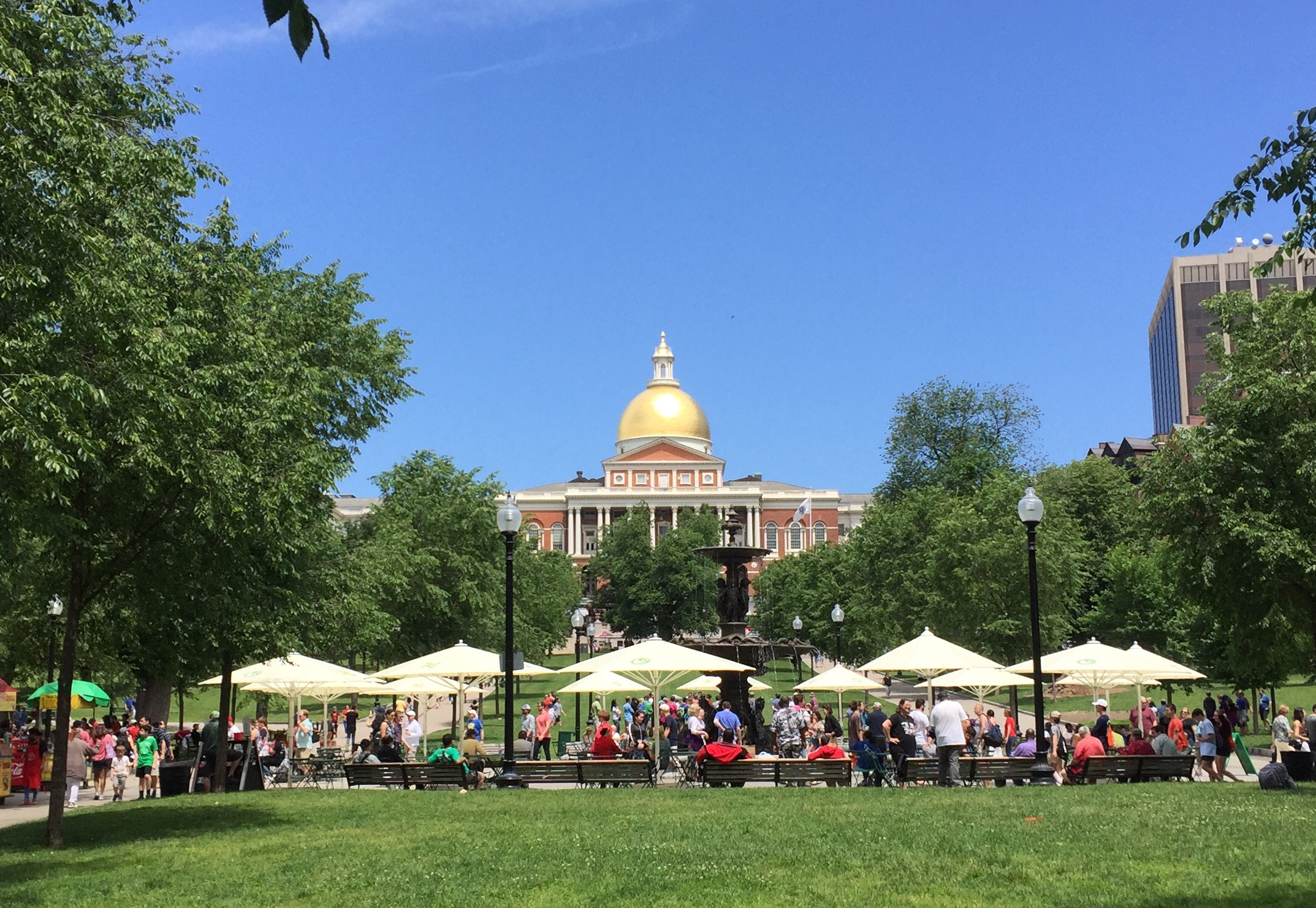
Massachusetts State House overlooks part of the Common

- The Massachusetts State House stands across Beacon Street from the northern edge of the Common.
- The Boston Public Garden, a more formal landscaped park, lies to the west of the Common across Charles Street (and was originally considered an extension of the Common).
- The Masonic Grand Lodge of Massachusetts headquarters sits across from the southern corner of the Common at the intersection of Boylston and Tremont Streets.
- Across from the southern corner of the Common, along Boylston and Tremont Streets, lies the campus of Emerson College.
- Across from the Common, to the southeast, Suffolk University has a dormitory on Tremont Street.

== Notable recurring events ==
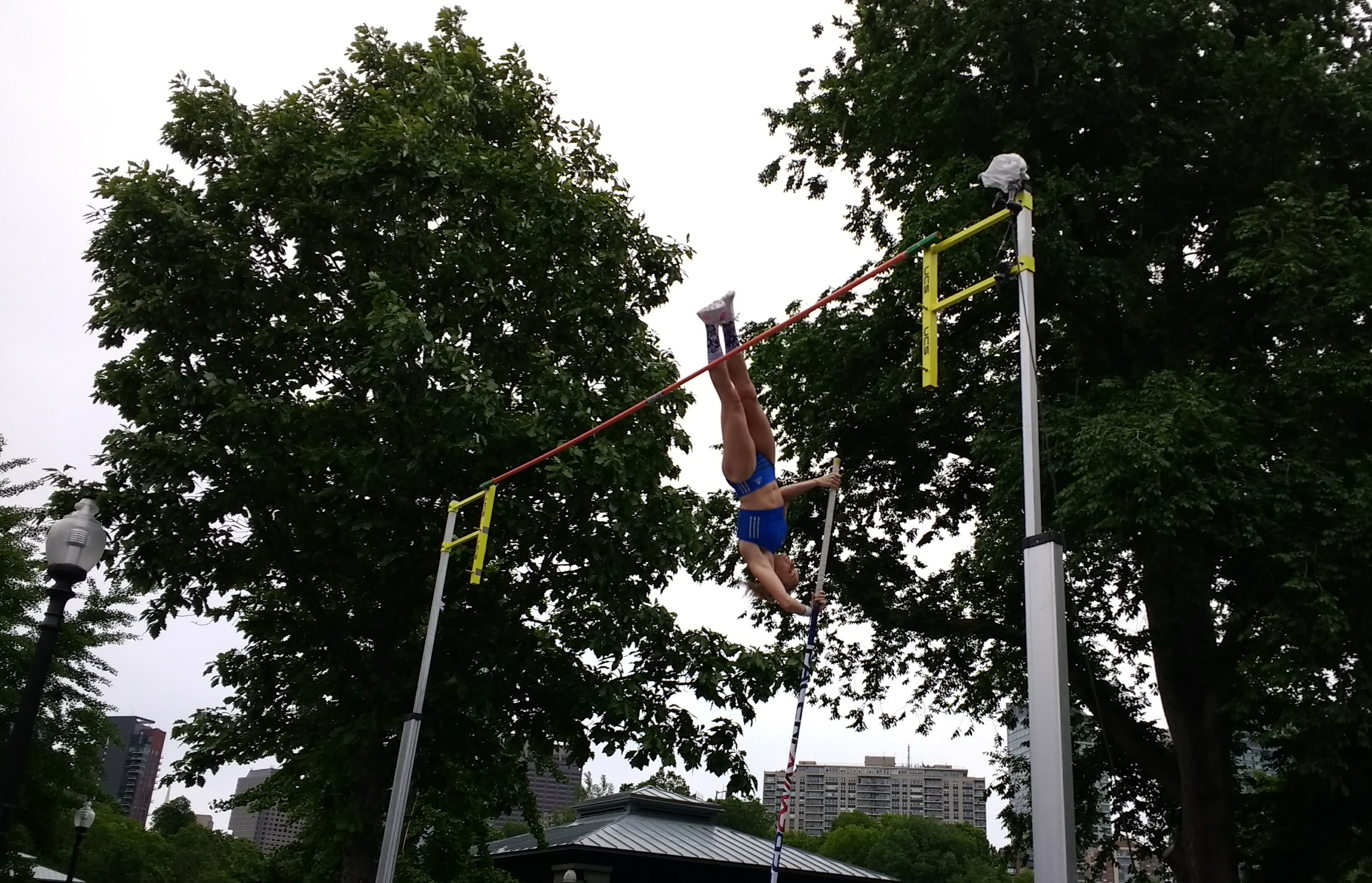
Women's Pole Vaulting on the Boston Common during Boost Boston Games 2017

- Frog Pond Skating Spectacular at the Boston Tree Lighting and First Night Boston, featuring skaters from The Skating Club of Boston
- Commonwealth Shakespeare Company's Shakespeare on the Common
- Boston Lyric Opera's Outdoor Opera Series
- Ancient Fishweir Project Installation Event
- Massachusetts Cannabis Reform Coalition's Freedom Rally
- Lighting of the Christmas tree gifted by Halifax, Nova Scotia
- Fireworks display on the evening of December 31 as part of Boston's First Night celebration
- An annual public Hanukkah menorah lighting is held at Brewer Fountain on Boston Common. The ceremony uses a 22-foot menorah and marked its 41st year in 2024.

== See also ==
- Alameda Central
- Boston martyrs
- Common land
- Granary Burying Ground
- King's Chapel Burying Ground
- List of National Historic Landmarks in Boston
- List of parks in Boston
- National Register of Historic Places listings in northern Boston

Preceded by First location – beginning of trail	Locations along Boston's Freedom Trail; Boston Common	Succeeded by Massachusetts State House
