= List of parks in Boston =

Boston, Massachusetts has an extensive park and open space network that is managed by several agencies including the city's Department of Parks and Recreation. Parks cover about 17% of the city's area, and all residents are within a 10-minute walk of a park. Boston has 930 parks, according to The Trust for Public Land's ParkScore.

== By neighborhood ==
=== Allston-Brighton ===
- Brighton Common
- Cassidy Playground (Walter F. Cassidy Playground)
- Fidelis Way Park

=== Beacon Hill ===
- Louisberg Square
- Phillips Street Park
- Temple Street Park

=== Charlestown ===
- Galvin Memorial Park
- Winthrop Square

=== Downtown / Back Bay ===
- Back Bay Fens
- Boston Common
- Boston Public Garden
- Clarendon Street Playlot
- Frieda Garcia Children's Park
- Jenney Plaza
- Norman B. Leventhal Park/Post Office Square
- Rose Kennedy Greenway
- Rowes Wharf Plaza
- Union Street Park

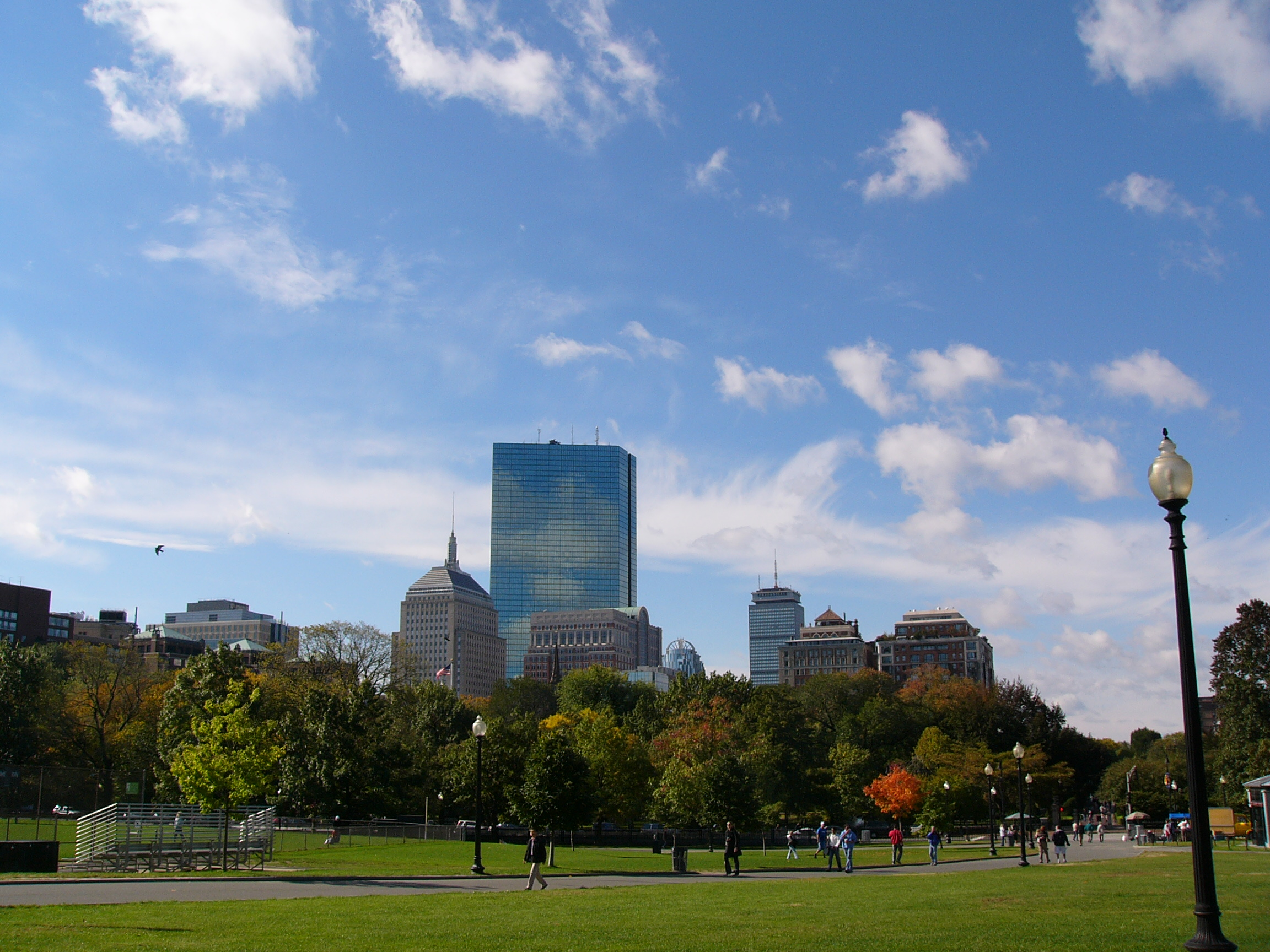
Boston Common

=== Dorchester ===
- Dorchester Shores Reservation
- Franklin Park

=== East Boston ===
- American Legion Playground
- Bremen Street Park
- East Boston Memorial Park
- Golden Stairs Terrace Park
- LoPresti Park
- McLean Playground
- Piers Park
- Putnam Square Park

=== Fenway/Kenmore ===
- Commonwealth Avenue Mall
- Edgerly Road Playground
- Forsyth Park
- Ramler Park

=== Harbor Islands ===
- Spectacle Island

=== Jamaica Plain ===
- Anson Street Garden
- Arcola Street Community Park
- Arnold Arboretum
- Brewer-Burroughs Playground
- English High School Ball Fields
- Flaherty Park
- Forbes Street Playground
- Forest Hills Station Mall Park
- Forest Hills Preserve
- Hall/Boynton Street Garden
- Jamaica Pond
- Jefferson Playground
- Johnson Park
- Lawndale Terrace Garden Park
- McBride Garden
- Mozart Street Playground
- Murphy Field & Playground
- Nira Rock Urban Wild
- Nira Avenue Garden
- Olmsted Park
- Paul Gore Beecher Street Community Garden
- Parkman Memorial Park
- Rossmore and Stedman Street Park
- South Street Courts and Mall
- South Street Community Garden
- Southwest Corridor Park
- Train Park

=== Mission Hill ===
- Back of the Hill Urban Wild
- Butterfly Garden
- Evans Way Park
- Iroquois Woods
- Kevin W. Fitzgerald Park
- Lawn Street Garden
- McLaughlin Playground
- Mission Hill Community Garden
- Mission Hill Playground
- Parker Hilltop/McLaughlin Woodlands
- Tobin Community Center Garden

=== Roslindale ===
- Roslindale Wetlands Urban Wild Park

=== South Boston ===
- Carson Beach
- Castle Island

=== West Roxbury ===
- Millennium Park
