= Carson Beach, South Boston =

Beach in South Boston, Massachusetts, US

Carson Beach
- Beach
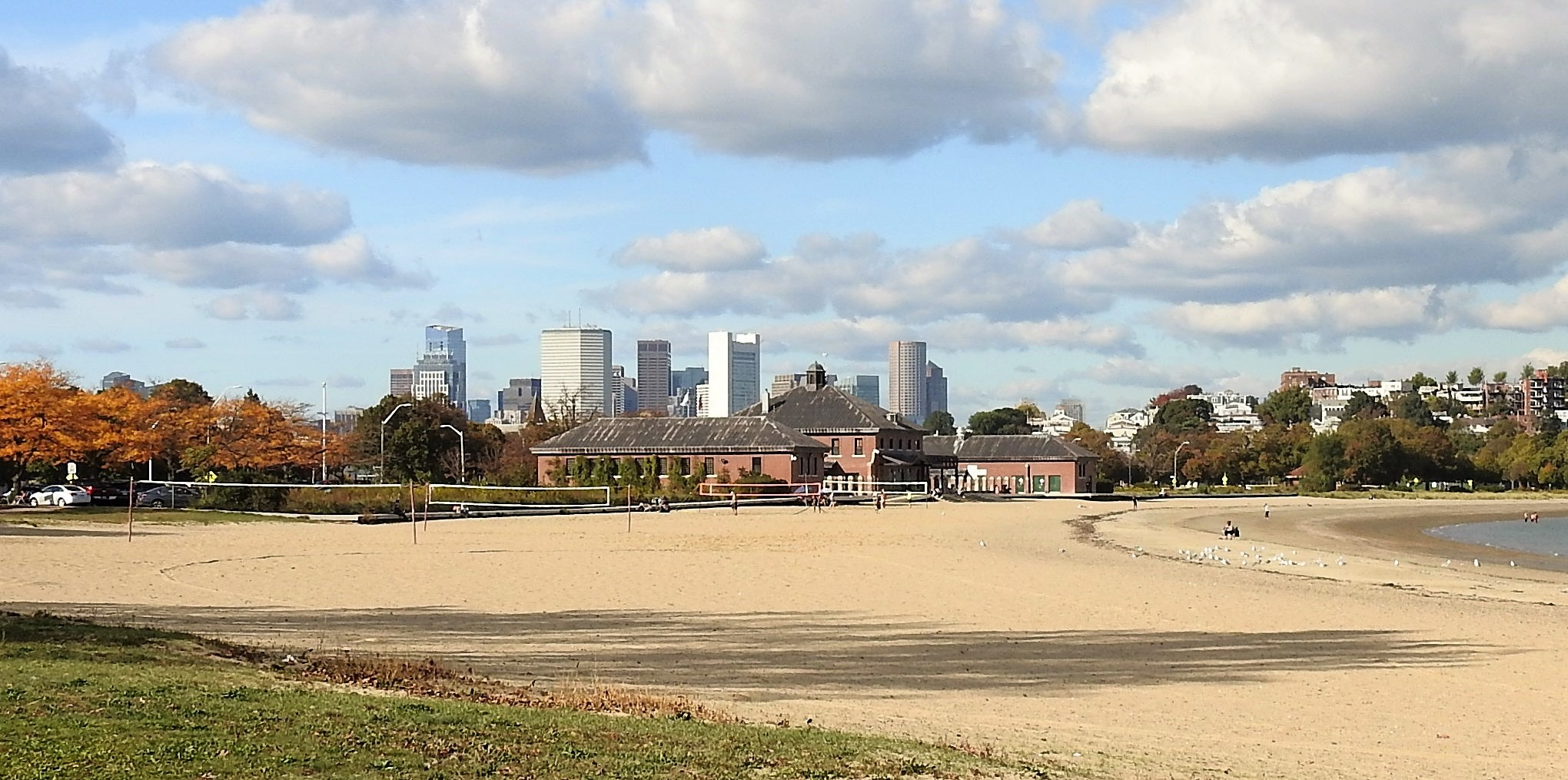
- Carson Beach, Fall 2019, With the Boston Financial District in the background

- Location within Massachusetts Location within Greater Boston area
- Coordinates: 42.3251°N 71.0479°W
- Location: South Boston, Massachusetts
- Operator: Department of Conservation and Recreation

Carson Beach is a public beach in South Boston, Massachusetts. It has also been known as L Street Beach. It is maintained by the state's Department of Conservation and Recreation. The beach is a part of a three-mile segment of parks along the South Boston shoreline. The closest subway stop is the JFK/UMass station on the Red Line, approximately a half-mile away. In the mid-1990s, the beach's water quality was deemed unsafe due to sewage matter and other biological debris, and the beach had to be shut down. As of 2019, the water is usually approved for swimming. The beach was named after the winner of a city-sponsored swimming contest between the nearby Mosely and Carson Street Swim Clubs in Dorchester.

== Bathhouse ==
Carson Beach bathhouse was built in 1925 to serve local residents as a changing room and field house. The bathhouse served the local community through the 1950s and 60s. As the 70s came, an increasing amount of beach goers were using their newly purchased cars to explore beaches as far as Maine and Cape Cod. The bathhouse that served that local community became increasingly run down and unkempt.

On July 26, 1994, Massachusetts governor Bill Weld and Boston mayor Thomas Menino along with representatives from the Massachusetts held a joint press conference announcing the plan to renovate a large number of the Boston Harbor beaches and called it "Back to the Beaches." The group announced plans for $6,823,500 to be spent renovating the bathhouse and cleaning up the beach area. The new bathhouse had to be moved back from the sand dunes closer to Day boulevard. It was completed in 1998 and named after Edward J. McCormack Jr. who is a native of South Boston and served as the Massachusetts Attorney General from 1959–1963. The new bathhouse includes three pavilion, food and recreation stands and men's and women's bathrooms.

== Notable events ==
=== Racist clashes ===
Carson Beach has been the site of racial conflict. On August 10, 1975, hundreds of Black Bostonians gathered for a peaceful protest "to assert their right to use Boston’s public spaces". The protest devolved into violence after white onlookers called the protesters racial slurs, told them that they did not belong at the beach, and began throwing things at the protesters.

Racial violence broke out again two years later. August 3, 1977 was the final day of a two-week racist clash over access to who was allowed to use the Carson Beach and its bathhouses.

Racial conflict during the summer of 1977. The picture shows Columbia Point in the background, a public housing project. Police separate whites from blacks at the beach.

Local white beachgoers were upset that Black and Hispanic people from the neighboring Columbia Point projects were using the beach. Richard Bates, the head of the FBI in Boston, sent agents in to observe the conflict. The arrests began at 2:30 p.m. when a white youth verbally abused a black youth and the two entered into a physical altercation. A total of forty-eight arrests were made, including four white youths.

=== Turmoil at the Currach Races ===
On May 25, 1987, the beach hosted currach races with rowing clubs from Dorchester, New York City and Annapolis, MD competing in five separate races. The club from Dorchester won all of the races.

This event was close to cancelled due to a racist message made by the head of Dorchester's Currach Club, which consisted of 40 Irish immigrants. He said that the safety of the Dorchester club could not be guaranteed because the New York club had three members of color. He added that the members of color would hurt the fundraising efforts of his own club.

The permit for the race was temporarily revoked by mayor Raymond Flynn, but the two sides met for four days prior to the races and the permit was reinstalled. The meetings were attended by state and city officials, local black community leaders and Alex Rodriguez, who was the commissioner of the Massachusetts Commission against Discrimination. Rodriguez and John Joyce, president of the Dorchester club agreed on a six-point plan, which allowed the races to go on. On the day of the race, mayor Flynn spoke to a gathered crowd of around 400 spectators and marked the agreement as a symbol of racial progress in the city before the races went on with no issue.

=== Memorial Day skirmish ===
On May 31, 2011, a fight broke out at the beach between rival gangs of children between the ages 14–19. There were around 1,000 individuals in attendance. The gathering was planned using Facebook. Over 100 officers from the State Police, the State Police Special Tactical Operations team, the Boston Police and Boston SWAT teams, UMass Boston Police, Transit Police and the Boston Housing Police responded. The officers were able to disperse the crowd to the nearby JFK station. Only a few arrests were made, but State Police spokesman Dave Procopio remarked, “veteran troopers assigned to the State Police barracks for a couple of decades have never seen as large a volume of kids that were there tonight”.

=== Kyzr Willis death ===
On July 26, 2016, a 7-year-old boy from Boston named Kyzr Willis drowned while attending a city-sanctioned summer camp at the Curley Community Center. Even though he could not swim, he went into the ocean without any floating devices; he also strayed away from the watch of the counselors and lifeguards. Rescuers found his body in 10-feet deep water hours later.

His family filed a lawsuit against the state claiming that they failed to enforce “Christians Law”. This law was passed in 2012 after a 4-year-old boy from Sturbridge, MA drowned. This law requires that daycare programs provide Coast Guard approved flotation devices to all participants who can not swim. Campers are required to take a swim test prior to entering the water to assess their level of ability. Neither of these measures were taken before Willis entered the water. The family settled with the city of Boston on April 6, 2018, for $5 million. Mellissa Willis, Kyzr's mother, said she planned to use this money to set up a scholarship foundation in honor of Kyzr.

== See also ==
- List of parks in Boston
