= Friends of the Public Garden =

Non-profit organization in Boston, Massachusetts

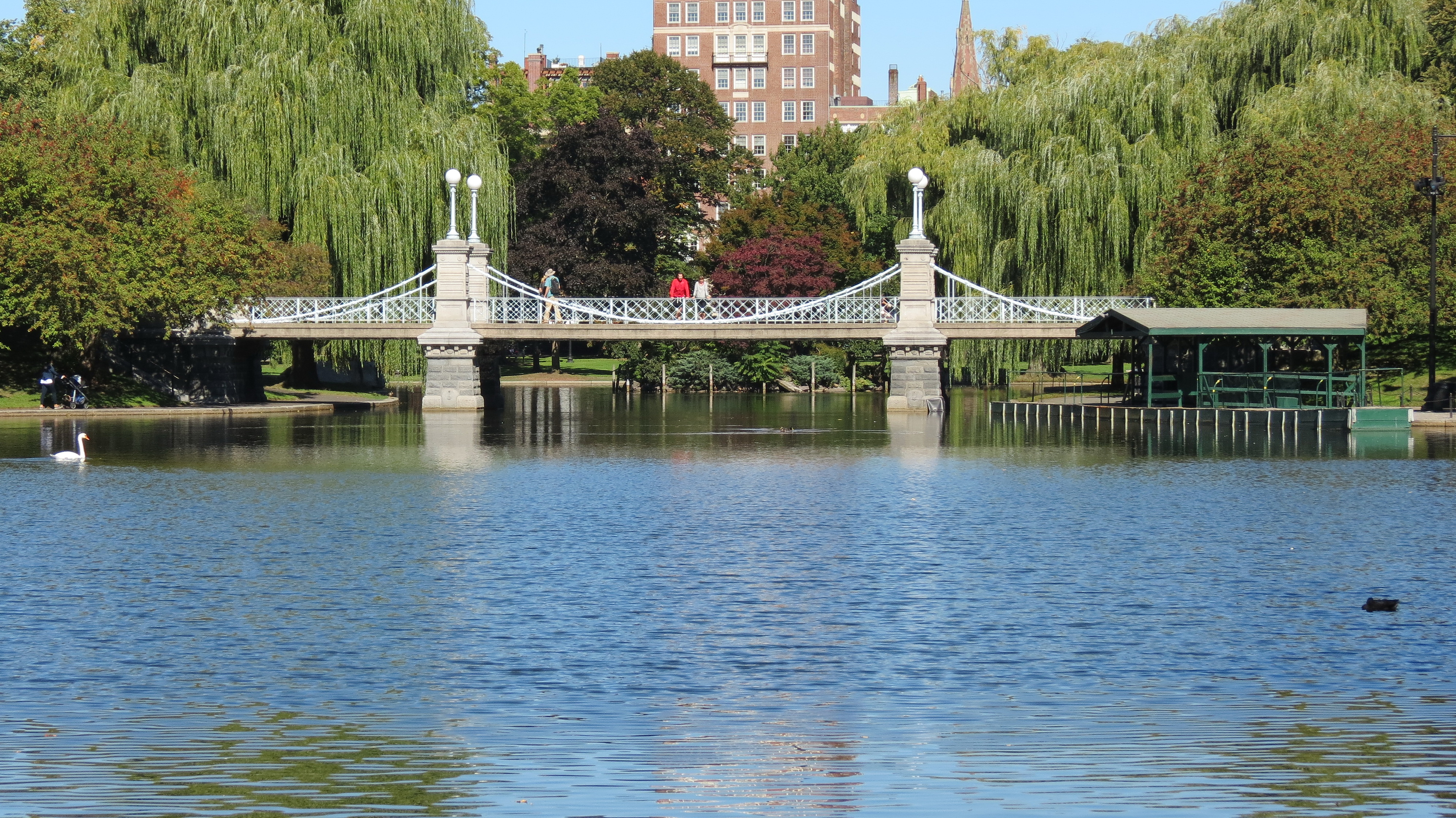
- Abbreviation: FOPG
- Founded: 1970
- Website: friendsofthepublicgarden.org

The Friends of the Public Garden (FOPG) is a non-profit organization founded in 1970 for the protection and preservation of the Boston Common, Public Garden, and Commonwealth Avenue Mall. Located in Boston, Massachusetts, the Friends of the Public Garden works with the Boston Parks Department to care for the trees, sculptures, gardens, and grounds in the three parks. The organization is supported by a full-time staff, board of directors, council, volunteers, and over 2,500 members. The group aims to care for the Boston Common, Public Garden, and Commonwealth Avenue Mall so that the parks can be fully enjoyed by current and future locals and visitors.

== History ==
In 1970 a group of local Bostonians founded the Friends of the Public Garden in response to the Boston Common and Public Garden falling into disrepair. Henry Lee, a schoolteacher at the time, was asked to be the chairman of the new organization and held 30 people in his home for their first meeting. The goal was to raise funds to combat the lack of city funding, which resulted in vandalism and neglect throughout the parks. The group started raising money to provide regular care for sculptures, fountains, trees, and plants. Within the first year, the Friends of the Public Garden's membership grew from 30 to over 500. The Friends' first major project was fighting the Park Plaza Urban Renewal Project in the mid to late 1970s. The project proposed building towers that reached over 400 feet in height along a street bordering the Boston Common and Public Garden. The Friends of the Public Garden fought the project, citing that the towers would cast shadows over the parks, destroying plant life and deterring visitors. The Friends successfully prevented the construction of the towers and continue to fight against projects that they believe will cause damage to the parks.

== Efforts ==
The Friends of the Public Garden raise money to be used for various care in the greenspaces, but they also have funds so members can donate specifically to tree care or sculpture care. Tree care includes planting, pruning, cataloging, and protecting and treating for disease. Sculpture care includes cleaning and minor and major restorations.

One of the concerns of the Friends is combating Dutch Elm Disease, a fatal disease that affects the Elm trees on the Boston Common, Public Garden, and Commonwealth Avenue Mall. The Friends test the trees in the parks, inject preventative treatments, and trap elm bark beetles, which spread the disease. Once a tree has been infected, it cannot be saved. The Friends then have the tree cut down, so as to not spread Dutch Elm Disease to surrounding trees.

While each statue is cleaned and restored, some of the statues, fountains, and memorials have required major restorations. This includes the Robert Gould Shaw/54th Regiment Memorial and the George Robert White Memorial Fountain. The Shaw/54th Regiment Memorial was the first sculpture restoration orchestrated by the Friends of the Public Garden. In the early 1980s, money was raised to restore the memorial in the Boston Common, as well as add the names of the soldiers in the 54th Regiment to the back of the statue. The George Robert White Memorial Fountain was restored at the end of 2016. The fountain was placed in the Public Garden in 1924 using $50,000 White donated to be used to create a memorial following his 1922 death. Water had stopped flowing through the fountain in the 1980s, and in 2014 the Friends began raising money to restore the fountain itself and fix the piping so that water would flow again. The project was completed at the end of 2016.

== Events ==
The Friends of the Public Garden hosts several annual fundraising events, including Duckling Day. Duckling Day is held each Spring on Mother's Day. The book Make Way for Ducklings, by Robert McCloskey, led to the creation of the Make Way For Ducklings statue in 1987, a landmark in the Public Garden featuring Mrs. Mallard and her eight ducklings. Inspired by the beloved statue, the Friends have hosted Duckling Day on the Boston Common for over 30 years. The festivities involve a costumed parade around the Common and Public Garden, as well as face-painting, puppet shows, and other kid-friendly activities. In 2016, over 1,000 people were in attendance at the event, including Boston Mayor Marty Walsh.
