= Millennium Park (Boston) =

Public park in Boston, Massachusetts

Coordinates: 42°16′54″N 71°10′53″W

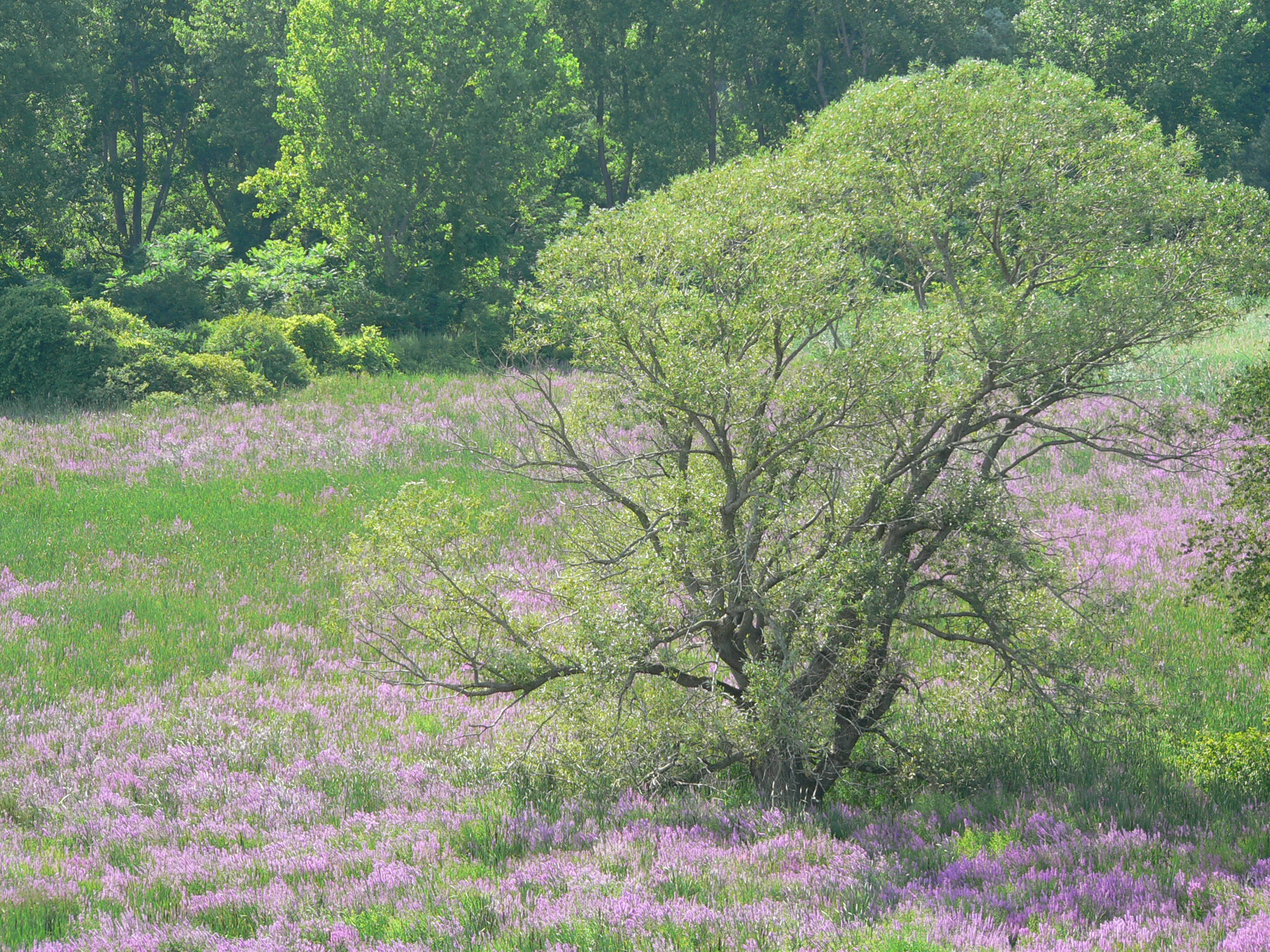
- Interactive map of Millennium Park
- Type: Urban Park
- Location: West Roxbury, Boston, Massachusetts
- Area: 100 acres (40 ha)

Millennium Park is a 100-acre urban park in the West Roxbury neighborhood of Boston, Massachusetts.

== History ==
The park began as the Gardner Street Landfill for the city of Boston. Construction began in 1994 to reclaim the area as a park using land excavated in the Big Dig, and it was officially opened on December 7, 2000, by then Mayor Tom Menino.

== Activities and amenities ==
The park is well connected to neighboring parks and trails. It is adjacent to the Brook Farm Historical site and the Upper Charles River Reservation, and is close to the VFW Parkway. It contains conservation land, 25 acres of sports fields, children's play areas, and a canoe launch on the Charles River.

== Image gallery ==
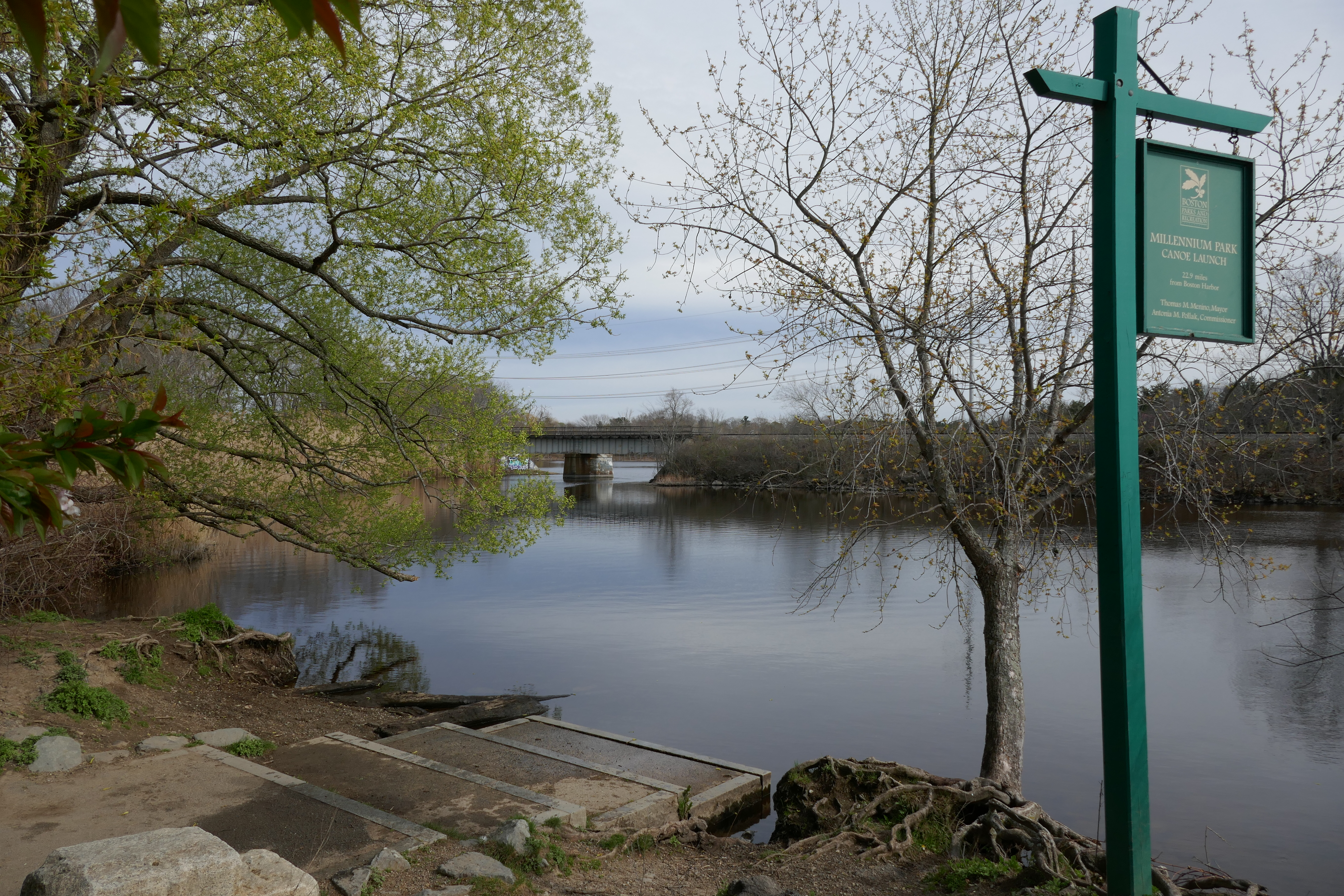
Canoe launch

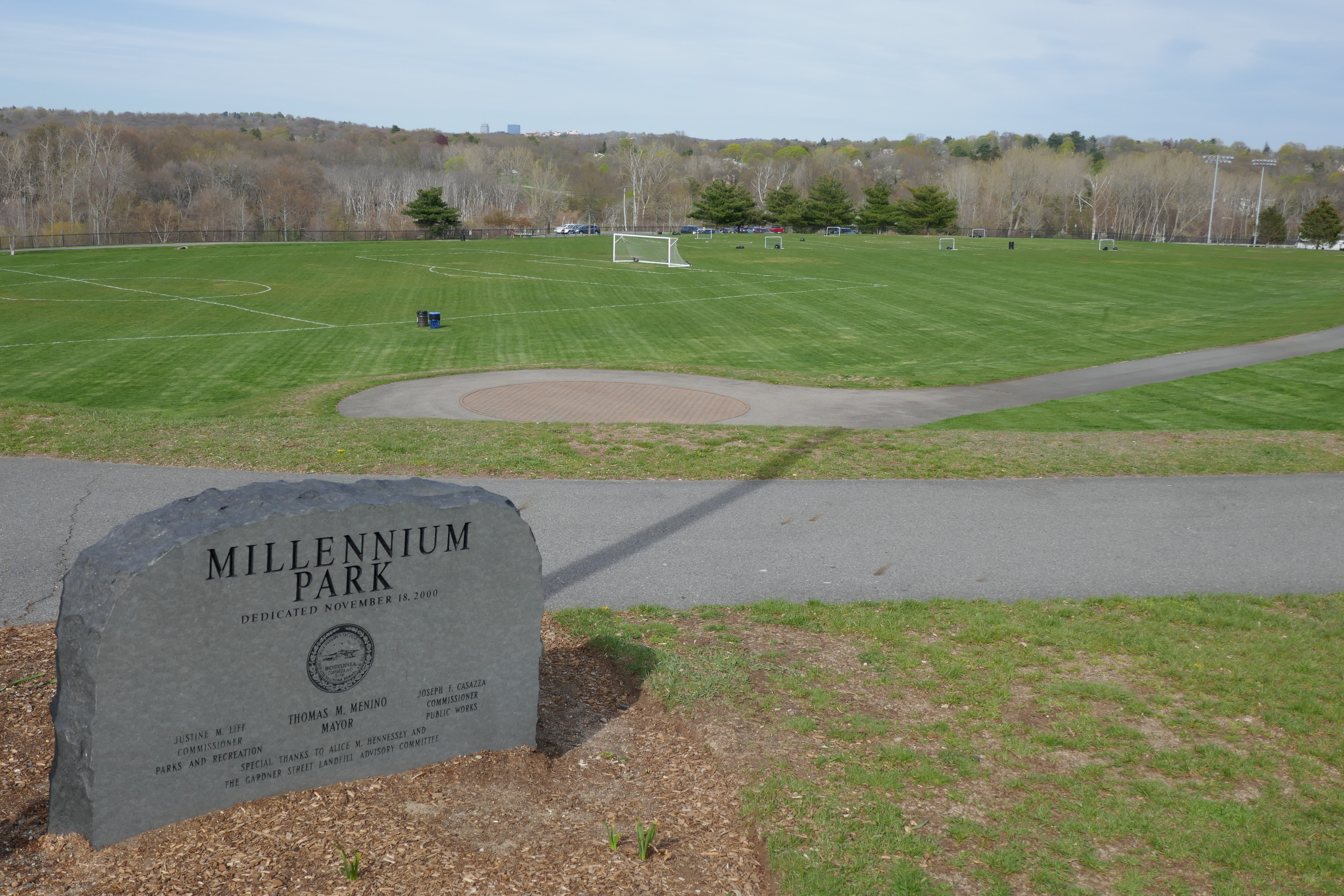
Soccer field

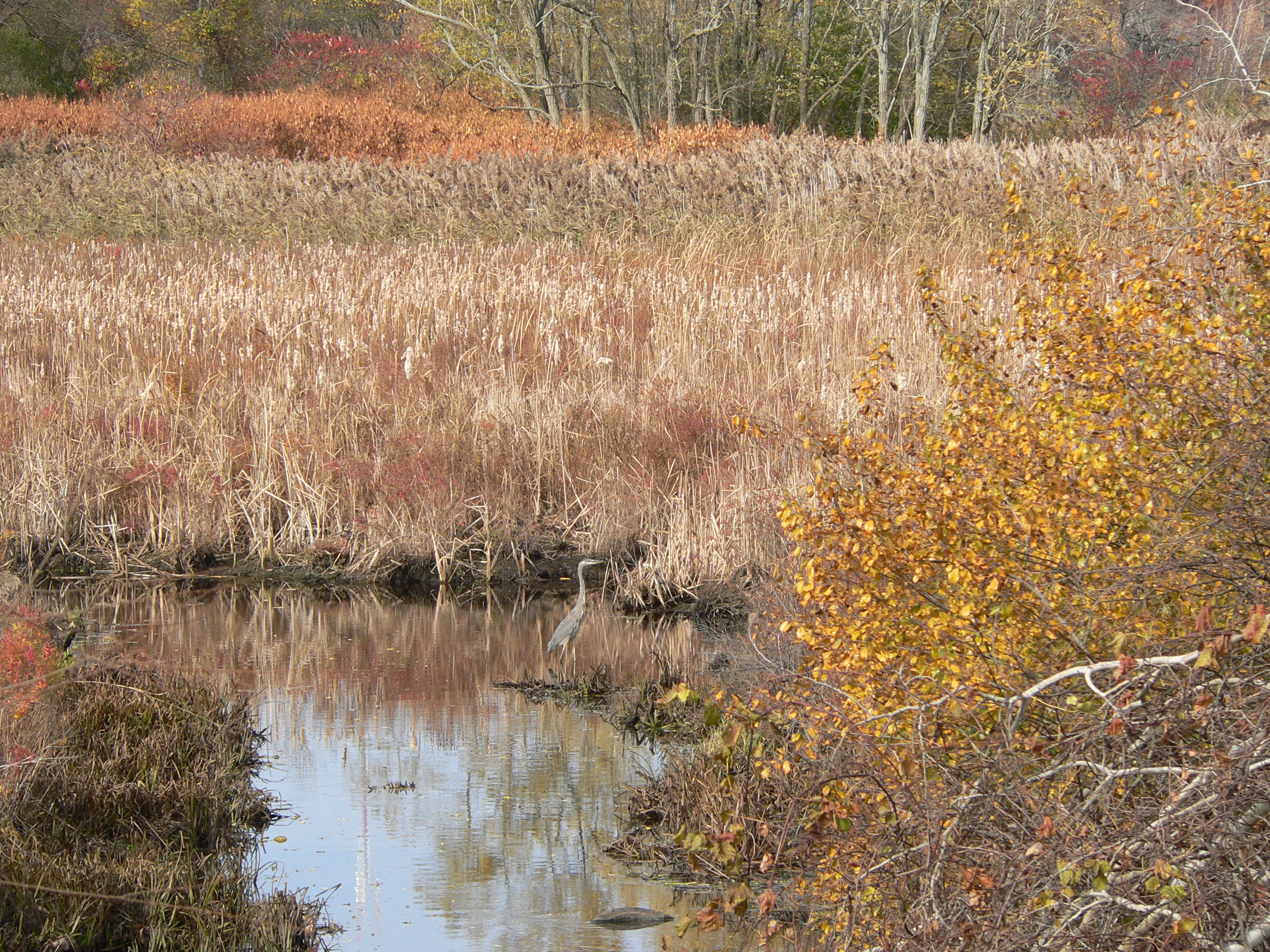
Great Blue Heron in a marsh

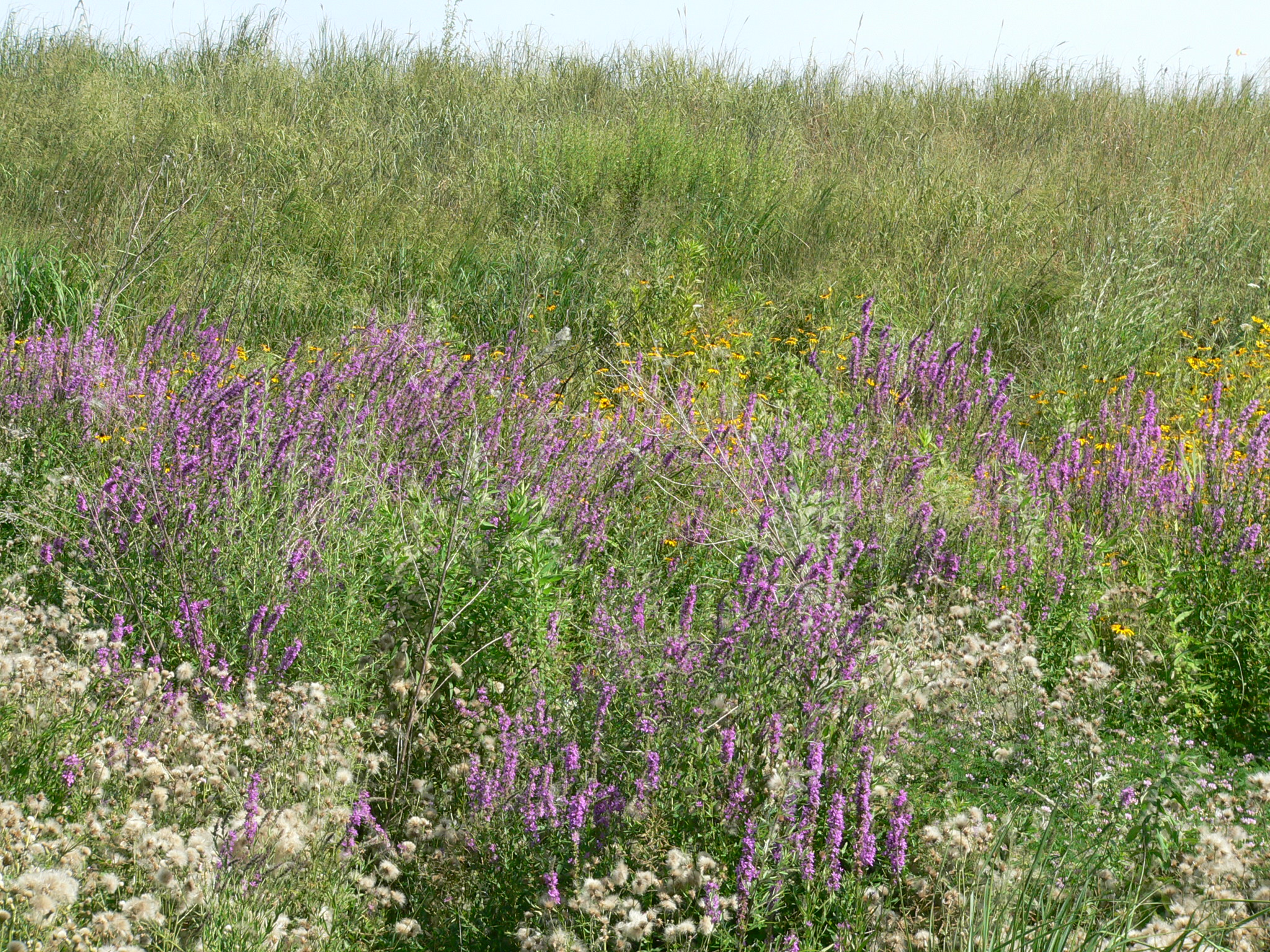
Flowers on the side of the hill formed by the capped landfill

== See also ==
- List of parks in Boston
