= Parkman Bandstand =

Landmark bandstand on the Boston Common

Coordinates: 42°21′12.72″N 71°04′01.34″W

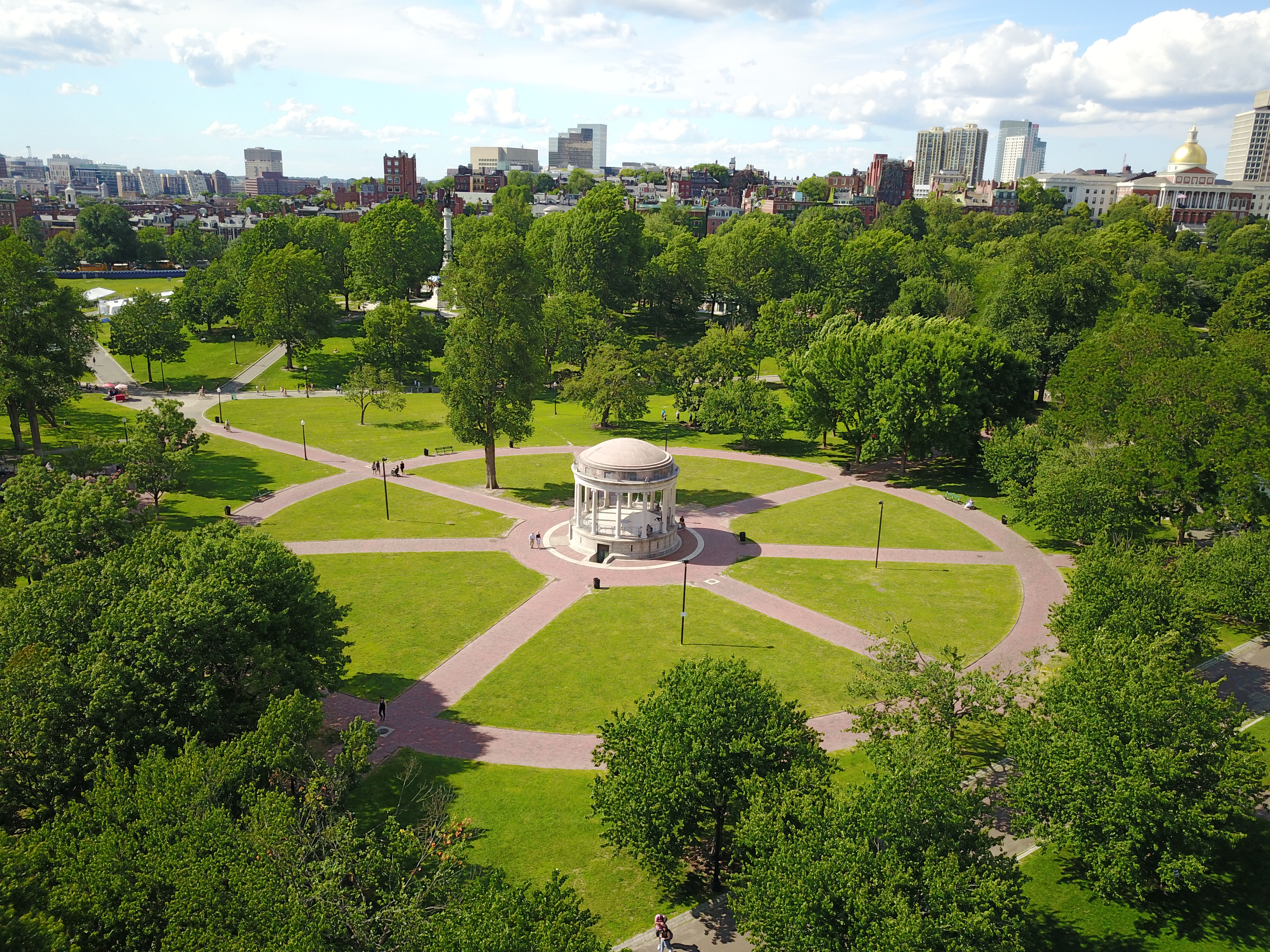

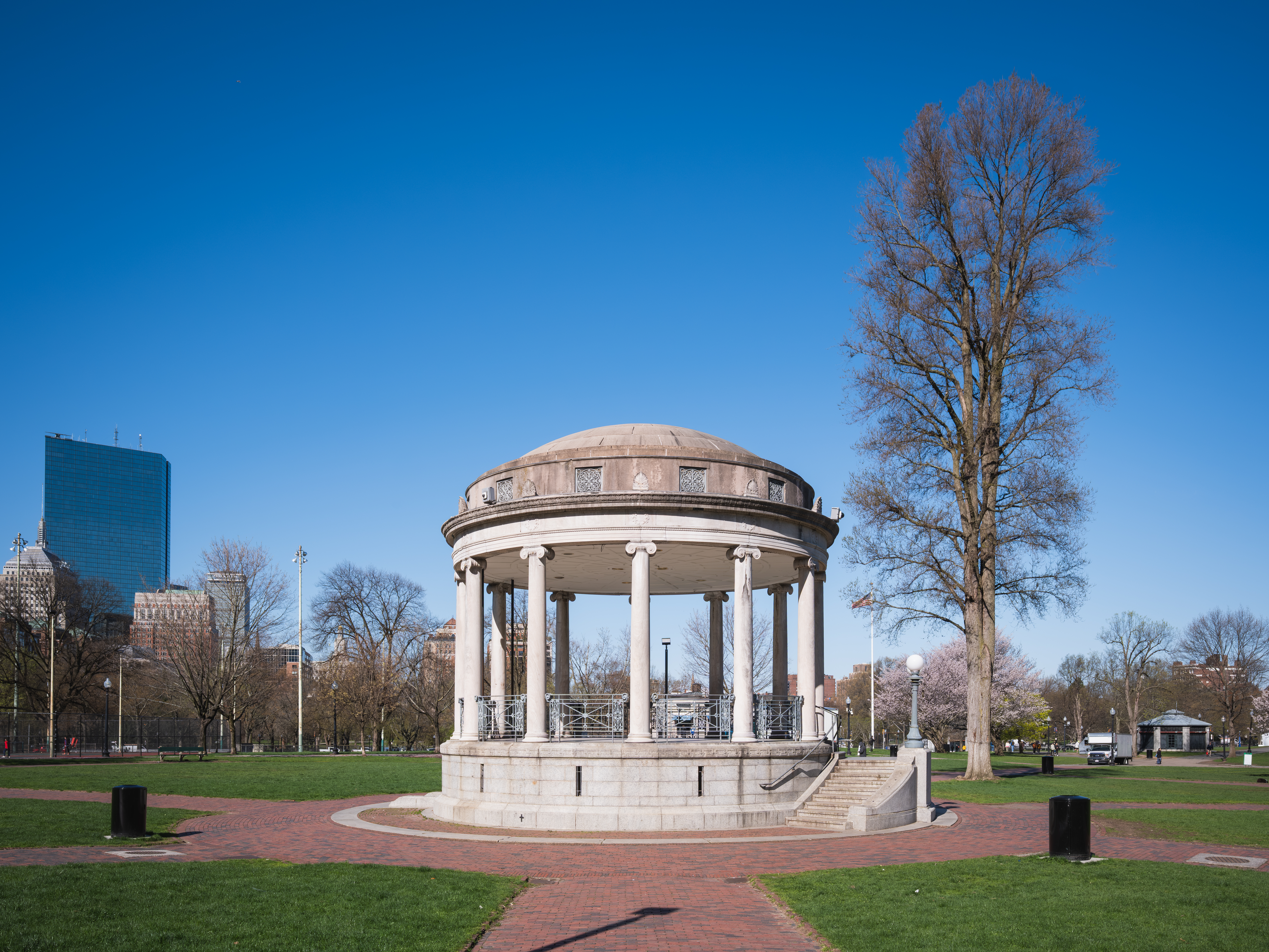

The Parkman Bandstand is a landmark bandstand located on the eastern side of the Boston Common in Boston, Massachusetts, United States. It was built in 1912 from a design by Derby, Robinson & Shephard at a cost of $1 million on the site of the Cow Pond (also known as the Horse Pond), which had been filled in 1838 after cattle-grazing had been outlawed on the Common.

Named for George F. Parkman, the bandstand was constructed following his death in 1908, in honor of a $5 million donation he had willed for the care of the Boston Common and other city parks. Parkman was the son of George Parkman, a doctor who had donated land for Harvard Medical School's first campus. The site quickly became noted for the autumnal colonial-themed puppet shows that occurred there starting in 1922.

In 1996, the bandstand was restored and is used today for concerts, rallies, and speeches. Recent notable gatherings include the Boston Freedom Rally and a 2007 Presidential Primary rally in which both Barack Obama and Deval Patrick gave speeches from the bandstand.
