= Felt family =

Family of politicians

The Felt family is a family of politicians from the United States that descends from George Felt, a 17th-century English-born New England colonist. Below is a list of members:

- Peter Felt (1784–1866), New Hampshire State Representative 1825 1828–1829. First cousin of John Felt and Daniel Felt.
- John Felt (1798–1887), New Hampshire State Representative. First cousin of Peter Felt and Daniel Felt.
- Daniel Felt (1799–1882), New Hampshire State Representative 1855. First cousin of Peter Felt and John Felt.
- Josiah Robbins (1761–1850), New Hampshire State Representative. Second cousin by marriage of Peter Felt, John Felt, and Daniel Felt.
  - Dorman Felt (1810–1876), Michigan State Representative 1859–1860. First cousin once removed of Peter Felt, John Felt, and Daniel Felt.
  - David Alvaro Felt (1820–1892), Commissioner of Sullivan County, New Hampshire; New Hampshire State Representative. First cousin once removed of Peter Felt, John Felt, and Daniel Felt.
    - Marcellus H. Felt, New Hampshire State Senator 1903–1904. Grandnephew of John Felt.
      - Jesse F. Libby, New Hampshire State Representative 1903 1905. Great-grandnephew of Peter Felt.
      - Andrew Jackson Felt, delegate to the Republican National Convention 1868 1872, Lieutenant Governor of Kansas 1889–1893. Third cousin thrice removed of Peter Felt, John Felt, and Daniel Felt.
        - William Howard Thompson (1871–1928), Attorney of Allen County, Kansas; District Court Judge in Kansas 1906–1913; U.S. Senator from Kansas 1913–1919; candidate for U.S. Representative from Kansas 1922. Son-in-law of Andrew J. Felt.
- Eugene K. Felt (1838–1915), Wisconsin State Assemblyman and delegate to 1888 Kansas State Republican Convention

Other members of the Felt family include the following:

- Adrienne (Adriana) Porter Felt, computer scientist
- Dorr Felt, American inventor
- Ephraim Porter Felt, entomologist
- George Felt, first of the family to arrive in the U.S. and early English settler to the Massachusetts Bay Colony, of the Thirteen Colonies, who arrived on September 6, 1628, to Naumkeug, later named Salem, Massachusetts
- Harry D. Felt, US Navy admiral
- Jeremiah Andrews Felt, public servant and farmer
- John H. Felt, architect
- Joseph Barlow Felt (1789-1869), Dartmouth College class of 1813; scholar and writer who documented the earliest settlement and Puritan culture of Salem, Massachusetts.
- Joseph B. F. Osgood, politician
- Louie B. Felt, Mormon president
- Mark Felt, American law enforcement officer who worked for the Federal Bureau of Investigation and in 2005, at age 91, revealed that he had been the anonymous source known as "Deep Throat" in the Watergate scandal that led to the resignation of President Richard M. Nixon.
- Nathaniel H. Felt, politician

== See also ==
- List of United States political families
- Mill Creek (Falmouth Foreside)
- Feltville Historic District
- Felts Mills
