= Jeremiah Andrews Felt =

Illinois public servant and farmer (1817-1906)

- Born: May 2, 1817; New Ipswich, New Hampshire
- Died: February 27, 1906 (aged 88); Quincy, Illinois
- Occupation: Farmer
- Known for: Public service, family of pioneers
- Spouse: Adriana Leach

Jeremiah Andrews Felt (1817-1906) was a school trustee, commissioner of the highways, and farmer in Quincy, Illinois, United States.

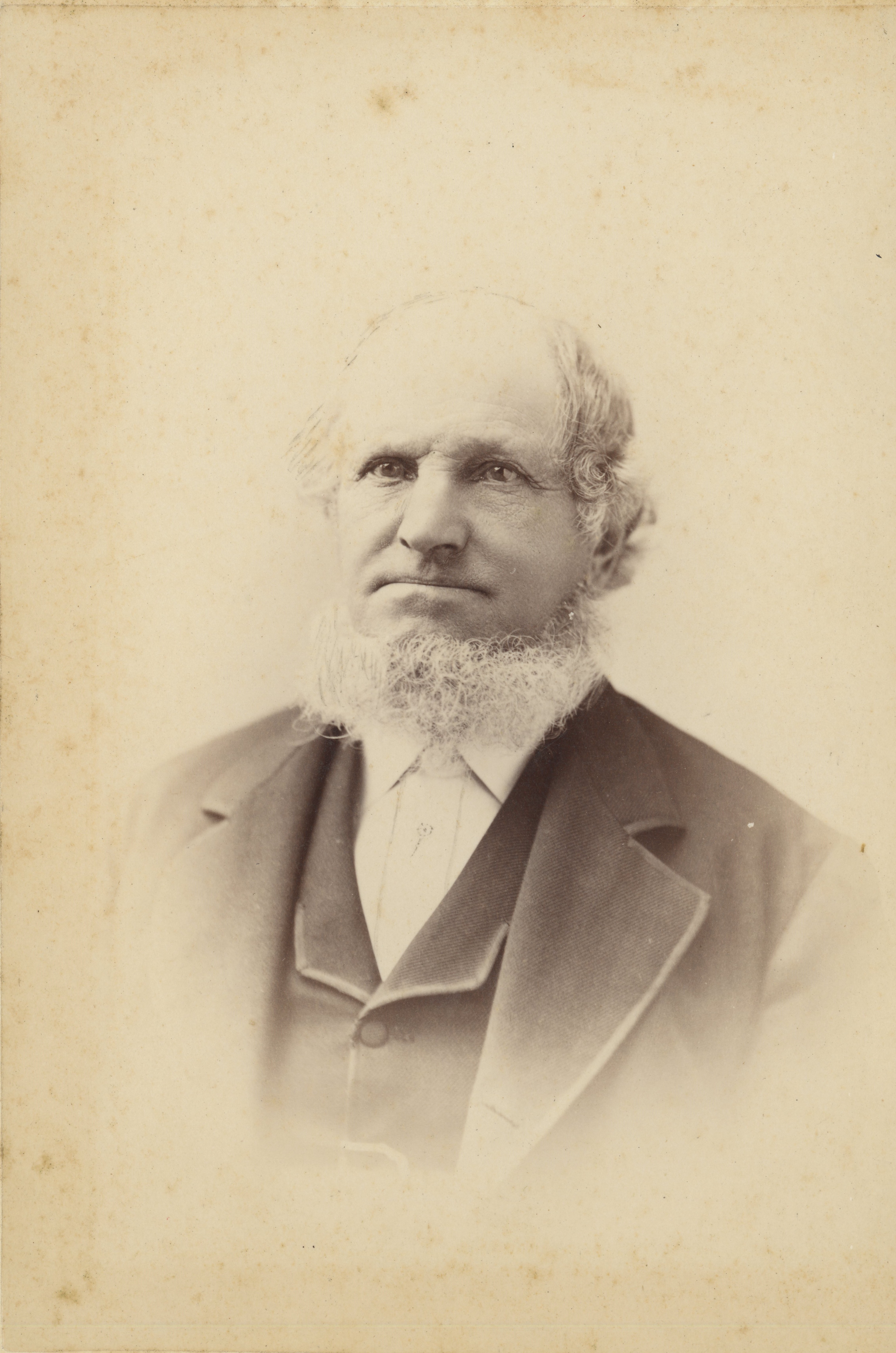
Jeremiah Andrews Felt (American, 1817-1906), Quincy, Illinois

== Life ==
=== Family in military ===
Jeremiah, a member of the Felt family, was born in New Ipswich, New Hampshire, in 1817, the second surviving son of pioneer and abolitionist Peter Felt and Polly Mary Fletcher. Both grandfathers served in the American Revolution—Sgt. Peter Felt Sr. and Fifer Ebenezer Fletcher, who wrote a memoir of his injury and captivity at age 16.

Jeremiah was named for a brother who died at age two, ten months before his own birth, and whose name honored their great uncle Jeremiah Andrews (1757-1826), who fought at the Siege of Boston, and in actions at Bunker Hill, Ticonderoga and Saratoga.

Military service was never far from Jeremiah: his own eldest son Peter Leach Felt—named for his father and grandfather—died of wounds received in the American Civil War.

=== Journey west ===
Young Jeremiah, at age 13, left New Hampshire with his father, mother and siblings—Albert, Adeline, Charlie, and Edward—and came by carriage wagon to Troy, New York, thence canalboat by the Erie Canal to Buffalo, overland by wagon to the Ohio River and then by steamboat to Quincy, Adams County, Illinois, alongside the Mississippi River, arriving in June 1830. His father built a log cabin and was instrumental in founding the first Congregational church in the state. Jeremiah would later become a member of the Unitarian church.

In 1838, Felt moved to his father's farm in Warren County, near Galesburg, and hauled wheat in wagons to Chicago. He brought hogs and sold them in Chicago at the market price of 3 cents per pound. The following year, on December 5, 1839, he married Adriana Leach, daughter of Mathias and Lydia (Chandler) Leach and born at Boston in 1819. They had eleven children; nine survived into adulthood.

=== Civil War ===
On September 20, 1863, Felt's eldest son, Pvt. Peter Leach Felt, and a member of the 78th Illinois Infantry, was wounded at the Battle of Chickamauga (Tennessee). He lay on the battlefield all night. Chickamauga was the most significant Union defeat in the Western Theater, and involved the second-highest number of casualties after the Battle of Gettysburg. On the final day, the 78th Illinois served a vital role as part of Mitchell's Brigade in reinforcing Maj. Gen. George H. Thomas at the height of the Confederate attack and took 40 percent casualties.

The next morning, September 21, Peter was taken prisoner by the rebels and to hospital at Chattanooga, Tennessee. His father, Jeremiah, received word and started for Tennessee in hopes of seeing his son. "He got as far as Nashville (133 miles away) where he was told he could not pass farther." Private Peter Leach Felt died October 9, ten days after his twenty-third birthday, without seeing his father.

== Death ==
Author William Herzog Collins in 1905's Past and Present of the City of Quincy and Adams County, Illinois wrote: "Looking back over the past, [Jeremiah] has little to regret for his has been an honorable and useful career. In politics he has long been an earnest republican. He cast his first presidential ballot for General William Henry Harrison and upon the organization of the republican party he joined its ranks and has voted for each nominee at the head of the ticket to the present time, including the chief executive of the nation at the time of this writing. For thirty years he was a school director and has been school trustee and commissioner of highways. He lives a quiet life at the old home, his daughter Adriana acting as his housekeeper. He is well preserved for a man of his years and he receives the respect and veneration which should ever be accorded those who have traveled far on life's journey and who have always followed honorable, manly principles."

The following year, on January 10, 1906, Felt fell, breaking his hip. He died, at home, on February 27.

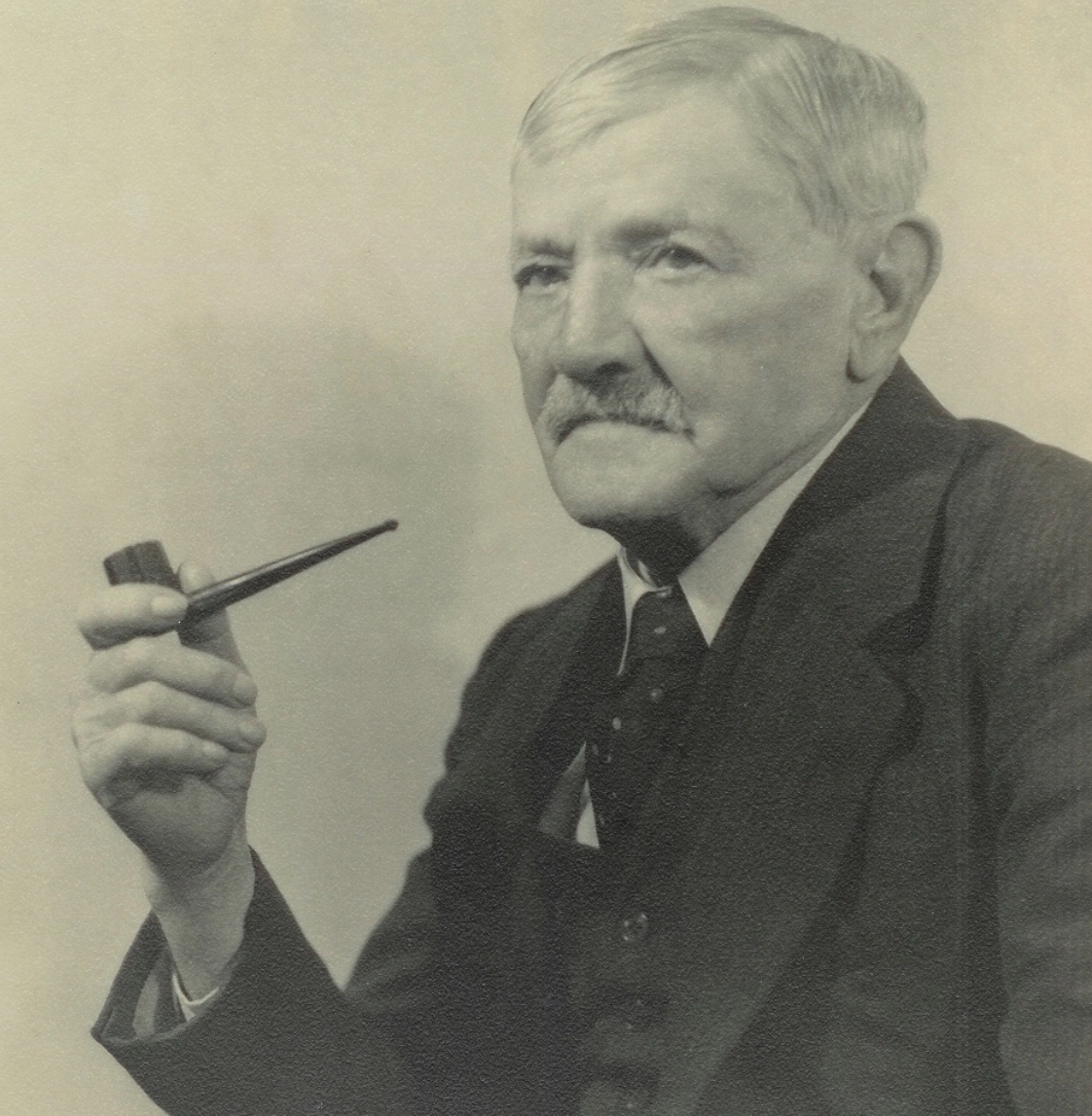
Charles Davis Felt (American, 1858-1949) Mendon, Missouri. Youngest son of Jeremiah A. Felt

== Legacy ==
In 1867, Felt sent his sons, William Winsor Felt and Winslow Leach Felt, with their brother George Washington Felt, to establish farms in Chariton County, north-central Missouri, to the immediate northwest of where the original Mendon would be laid out four years later in 1871. The family would accumulate more than 320 acres (130 ha).

Felt's youngest son Charles Davis Felt came in 1880 and took over the farm of his brother Winslow, who had died earlier that year, which was a few years after his wife and child had died. At age 23, in Mendon, Charles married Lydia McCarl, 20, of La Harpe Township, Hancock County, Illinois, on December 28, 1881. They had two children: Chester and Adriana.

Charles Davis was a lifelong Methodist, according to his daughter-in-law in a family genealogy.

On January 13, 1888, William and Charles Felt sold a large portion of their farmlands to the Mendon Land & Trust Co., James T. Richie president, to establish the new village of Mendon alongside the railroad line, which was mile and a quarter northwest of the old village. The Felts donated land for the erection of a high school. By 1930, Charles Felt held 213 acres (86 ha) adjacent to Mendon.

Charles and Lydia's son Chester Arthur Felt (1885-1970) became a banker and married Bernah Loew Felt (1890-1981), the daughter of Swiss, German and British emigrants, on October 11, 1909. They had two sons. Arthur Emil Felt (1911-2002) was an engineer for the Ethyl Corporation, and married Irene Fisher on February 10, 1940, in Angola, Indiana. They had five children.

Charles Woodrow Felt (1913-1957) was a dentist and a Captain in the U.S. Army Dental Corps in England, France, Belgium and Germany during the Second World War. He is buried at Salem, Missouri. He married Gertrude Hattie (Trudy) Lineberry on August 19, 1938 in Mendon. They had two children and five grandchildren.
