= Peter Felt =

New Hampshire politician and Illinois pioneer

- Born: December 1, 1784; Temple, New Hampshire
- Died: July 31, 1866 (aged 81); Quincy, Illinois
- Occupations: Cotton mill owner, politician, farmer
- Years active: 1804 - 1861
- Known for: New Hampshire politician, state militia, abolitionist
- Spouse: Polly Mary Fletcher

Peter Felt (December 1, 1784 – July 31, 1866) was a New Hampshire politician and pioneer, among the early settlers of Quincy, Illinois. He joined the abolitionist movement and helped found the first Congregational church in the state.

== Early life and family ==
Peter Felt was born in Temple, New Hampshire, in 1784. He was a descendent of English emigrant and Massachusetts colonist George Felt.

Peter was the fourth of the nine surviving children (out of 13), the second male, born to Peter Felt Sr. (1745-1817) and Lucy Andrews (1748-1805). His parents were married in Concord, Massachusetts, in 1769, by Rev. William Emerson, the grandfather of the noted American essayist Ralph Waldo Emerson.

In 1763, Peter's father and uncle, Aaron Felt, came to Temple, New Hampshire, from their birthplace in Lynn, Massachusetts. Aaron built a house and operated an inn, which became known as the Felt-Young-Duval House and was down the road from his brother Peter Sr.'s home, later called the Felt-Tobey-Scott House. Aaron was said to have owned the first clock in town. He played the violin.

Peter Sr. was one of the six sons of Aaron Felt and Mercy Waite all of whom served in the American Revolution, including at the Battles of Lexington and Concord. All survived, though two were wounded.

Peter Sr. marched with Capt. Ezra Town's company, Col. James Reed's regiment, under General John Sullivanduring the Quebec campaign in 1776 and served as a sergeant at the Battles of Saratoga.

Peter Felt Sr. was a shoemaker by trade, and after the war, he erected a "commodious house" southeast of Temple village that still stands. He worked in a small room on the second floor in front of one of the home's nine fireplaces.

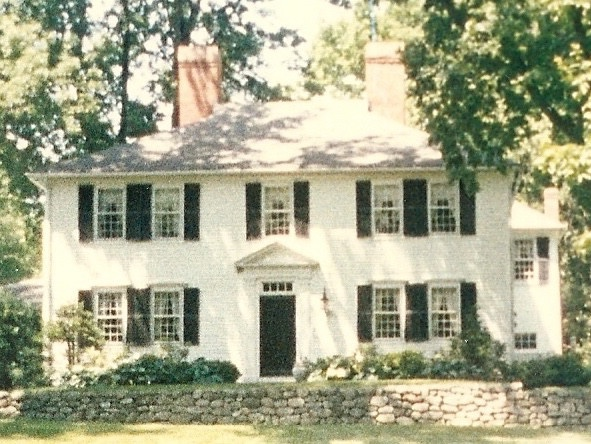
Birthplace of Peter Felt, erected by his father Peter Felt Sr., Temple, New Hampshire. Also known as the Felt-Tobey-Scott House.

Peter Felt Jr. obtained his education at the New Ipswich Academy. He became known as "Colonel Felt," though "no one recalled the origin of the title." In a book published in 1824, he is listed as "Colonel, Lieutenant Colonel" in the 22nd regiment of the state militia.

On June 4, 1807, he married Polly Mary Fletcher (1785–1840), daughter of New Ipswich natives Mary Cummings (1763-1847) and Ebenezer Fletcher (1761-1831), who was wounded in the American Revolution and wrote A narrative of the captivity and sufferings of Ebenezer Fletcher of New Ipswich.

Felt erected a house at Smithville (Smith Village), southwest of New Ipswich Common, across the lane from his father-in-law, Ebenezer Fletcher, whose home still stands. His wife gave birth to nine children, six of whom lived into adulthood.

In 1810, Peter Felt, with Josiah and Joel Davis, helped convert an old ironworks and held a stake in a cotton textile mill on the north branch of the Souhegan River for 17 years. He was a New Hampshire state representative in 1825 and again between 1828 and 1829.

He was a member on the committee for the Third Meeting-House in 1813 and was a subscriber for a new bell. From 1823 to 1830, he was a member of the Board of Trustees of New Ipswich Academy. From 1824 to 1829, Felt was a selectman in town council. In 1828, Col. Felt was a member of the committee that purchased and established the town poor farm.

== Journey to Illinois ==
In 1830, the year following the untimely deaths of two of Peter and Polly's young children: Caroline Augusta, age five, and George, age two, the couple journeyed with their surviving young children (youngest age two) to the Great Plains of the Midwestern United States. They went from Smithville, New Ipswich, New Hampshire, by carriage to Troy, New York, then by canal boat to Erie, Pennsylvania, overland to Pittsburgh, and by steamboat 981 miles down the Ohio River to Cairo, Missouri, and then up the Mississippi River to Quincy, Illinois, arriving in June 1830. Peter Felt's ancestors had lived in New England more than two centuries, since George Felt's arrival to the New World in 1628.

That winter, in the later years of the Second Great Awakening, on December 4, 1830, a small group gathered for a religious service in Felt's log cabin, on the southwest corner of Fourth and Maine streets, where the Gardner Museum, once the old public library, now stands.

The group founded the early Congregational church at Quincy, possibly the first in the state. There were four Presbyterians, three Congregationalists, three Baptists, five of "miscellaneous beliefs," and Rev. Asa Turner, a graduate of Yale Theological Seminary who had arrived the previous month. They first organized with the majority, as Presbyterians, but then agreed to organize as Congregationalists. They passed a resolution that "total abstinence was an indispensable term of admission to the church." By June 1832, “The great majority of our citizens can now come to Quincy and do business without whiskey."

The same year, a building was erected, called "The Lord's Barn." It was 30 feet (9 m) wide by 40 feet (12 m) long, though a memorial marker states it was 22 feet by 26 feet. Nonetheless, it was "a stark hut much admired," with the pulpit and seats "of planed boards," no upholstery, and no funds to purchase "a bell to call the people to worship."

Felt's home was considered “the first frame house in the city” where he and Mary resided for two years before Felt purchased 160 acres of land southeast of town. His eldest son Albert purchased a quarter section of land adjoining the father's. Felt was a leading figure among the party of pioneers from New Ipswich who emigrated to Quincy and Mendon Township about the same time, including the family of Unitarian minister Mary Safford.

== Abolitionist cause ==
Peter Felt was declared an abolitionist after he joined others in signing a petition that called for a convention of those who held that "the system of American slavery was sinful and ought to be immediately abandoned. . .." He was among the 17 signees who attended the Illinois anti-slavery convention organized by abolitionist editor Elijah Lovejoy at Alton in October 1837. A few days after the convention, Lovejoy was murdered by a mob, becoming a martyr of the abolitionist cause opposing slavery in the United States.

Abolitionist Richard Eells erected a home near Felt's on Fourth Street in Quincy in 1835, which became a significant stop on the Underground Railroad, assisting enslaved people, crossing the Mississippi river from Missouri, which was a slave state.

Felt's wife Polly Mary (Fletcher) Felt died in 1840, and he married a second time, in Quincy, the following year, to Alcey (Morey) Tanner, widow of Francis Tanner. They had one son together, Peter Francis Felt, who served in the 78th Illinois infantry in the American Civil War and was held prisoner in Tennessee, Mississippi and Alabama, before moving to Laclede, Missouri, after the war.

About 1851 they sold the family farm to Peter's eldest son Albert Felt and moved to a farm near Columbus, Illinois, about 15 miles (24 km) from Quincy.

On October 9, 1863, Felt's 23-year-old grandson, Pvt. Peter Leach Felt, son of Jeremiah Andrews Felt, and a member of the 78th Illinois Infantry, died from wounds received September 20, 1863, at the Battle of Chickamauga (Tennessee).

Two years later, the elder Peter Felt died at Quincy, Illinois, on July 31, 1866, at age 81. He was the oldest citizen of Quincy at the time. He is buried in the Woodland Cemetery.

The following year, 1867, Peter Felt's son, Jeremiah A. Felt, purchased land in north-central Missouri. Jeremiah's son Charles Davis Felt moved there about 1880. He sold his land to establish the new location for the town, Mendon, along the railroad in 1888 and donated land on which the high school was built.
