= George Felt =

English emigrant and colonist (1601-1693)

- Born: February 28, 1601; Leighton Buzzard, Bedfordshire, England
- Died: c. 1693 (aged 92); Malden, Massachusetts Bay Colony
- Spouse: Elizabeth Wilkinson

George Felt (February 28, 1601 – c. 1693) was a 17th-century English emigrant to the New England Colonies. A mason by trade, he is considered a founder of the Boston neighborhood of Charlestown, and is one of the three main early settlers of North Yarmouth, Massachusetts Bay Colony (now Yarmouth, Maine), along with John Cousins and William Royal.

== Arrival in the Colonies ==
George Felt arrived in Naumkeag, later named Salem, Massachusetts Bay Colony, on September 6, 1628, aboard the ship Abigail with John Endecott, regarded as one of the Fathers of Puritan New England.

Felt was born at Leighton Buzzard, Bedfordshire, England, and is considered the first of the Felt family in America.

He went to Charlestown, Massachusetts Bay Colony, the following year where he helped form a government with thirty-three other colonists in 1633. He erected a cabin at the original settlement, southwest of what was then called Mill Hill, now known as Town Hill, near what today is Galvin Memorial Park. In 1638, an inventory of the some 68 acres of land that Felt owned in Massachusetts included: "One Dwelling house with a garden plott, scituate on the south west of the mill hill, butting southward upon Charls river, northeast upon crooked lane, bounded on the norwest by Nicholas Trerrice, and on the southeast by Ben. Hubbard."

He then moved across the Mystic River, north to what is now Everett, Massachusetts. In 1643, he removed to what was then North Yarmouth, Massachusetts Bay Colony (now Yarmouth, Maine). He purchased 300 acres (120 ha) of land at Broad Cove from John Phillips, a Welshman.

Felt later owned a lot at the foot of the northern end of Pleasant Street in Yarmouth, adjacent to Stony Brook, in an area that became known as Grantville.

In 1684, military officer and fellow Englishman Walter Gendall claimed to own all of Felt's two thousand acres beside Casco Bay. He had purchased one hundred acres from him in 1680.

== Personal life ==
Felt's family in Bedfordshire, England, went by the family name Felce. He called himself George Felch, however, when he moved to America. He began to be known as George Felt in his later years.

In 1630, Felt married 29-year-old Elizabeth Wilkinson (1601–1694), with whom he had six children: Elizabeth (born c. 1635), George Jr. (1638–1676), Mary (1639–1725), Moses I (1641–1650), Aaron and Moses II (1651–1733).

He was said to have become a "wealthy landowner in Maine, but lost everything and died poor...."

Around 1649, the family moved from what is now Maine back to Malden, Massachusetts Bay Colony, just as it was being incorporated into a city. They returned to Casco Bay in 1667, shortly after which Felt bought 2,000 more acres of land from Phillips. He later lost most of the land in a deed dispute though his son, Moses II, and grandson George III, retained 300 acres.

Conflicts forged by King Philip's War caused the Felts to abandon their home.

In 1676, Felt's son and Mussel Cove resident, George Felt Jr., was killed on Peaks Island during the conflicts. He had a "fraught history with the Wabanaki, including land disputes," and was killed in an attack at a stone house in September 1676. The deceased's wife of fourteen years, Londoner Phillippa Andrews, moved to Salem, Massachusetts Bay Colony, where she married twice (to Samuel Platt in 1682 and Thomas Nelson in 1690) before her death in 1709. She had emigrated to America with her parents in 1635.

== Death ==
In 1684, an aging George Felt moved back to the Massachusetts Bay Colony. He wrote to the town of Malden: "Some time after the late Indian war it was withheld from me by some of the inhabitants of said Town of Caskoe Bay and being by said war much impoverished I could not recover it out of their hands. I also am now forced to suffer for want of convenient care taken of me in my present distresse being about eighty seaven year’s old and very crasy and weak."

He died in Malden around 1693, aged approximately 92, with Elizabeth surviving him by one year. The couple had become the first citizens of Malden to receive town aid, such was their fall from wealth during the latter stages of their time in North Yarmouth.

== Legacy ==
Descendants of George Felt (Felt family) and Elizabeth Wilkinson include American architect John H. Felt; the LDS Church's Children's Organization President Louie B. Felt (by marriage); American politician Nathaniel H. Felt; Egyptologist and inventor George Henry Felt; American Revolutionary War soldier Captain John Felt, who repulsed the British in February 1775 at the Salem Gunpowder Raid; and the American inventor and industrialist Dorr Felt.

George Felt's grandson Joshua Felt (1691–1744), son of Moses II, married Ann Walcott, the younger half-sister of the famed Mary Walcott, one of the "afflicted" girls called as a witness at the Salem Witch Trials in 1692-93. Ann's grandmother was Ann Holyoke Putnam, whose family founded Holyoke, Massachusetts. These marriages joined the Felts with the noted Holyoke, Walcott and Putnam families of England and New England. This includes Thomas Putnam Sr. (1615–1686), one of Salem's wealthiest residents and whose home remains in Danvers, Massachusetts, from 1648, as the oldest in the U.S. still owned by a descendant of the original family that had it erected.

George Felt's great-great-grandson Captain John Felt (1723–1785) was the "Hero of the British Repulse at North Field Bridge," or the Salem Gunpowder Raid, also known as "Leslie's Retreat" on February 26, 1775. It was the colonies' first armed resistance to British authority. Lieutenant-Colonel Alexander Leslie and 300 British soldiers from Boston attempted to seize illegally held ammunition during which they were repulsed by citizens led by Captain Felt in a bloodless confrontation. Felt was the great-grandson of George Felt Jr., who was killed in a Wabanaki raid on Peaks Island, a century earlier, in 1676.

Capt. Felt's son was a merchant and mariner in Salem whose descendants continued in the trade and whose papers have been collected by the Phillips Library at the Peabody Essex Museum.

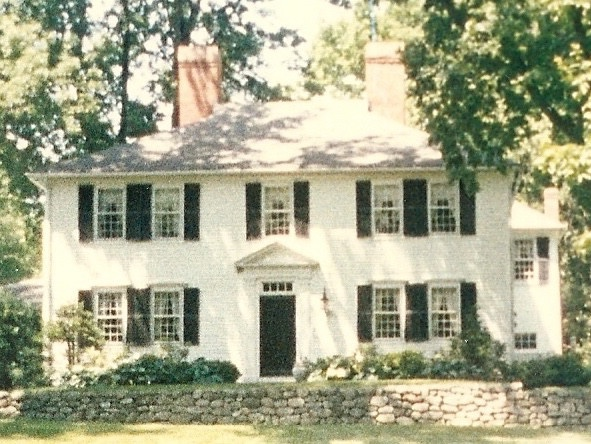
Home of the great-great-grandson of George Felt and Elizabeth Wilkinson, Sgt. Peter Felt, Temple, New Hampshire. Known today as the Felt-Tobey-Scott House

George Felt's great-great-grandson Sergeant Peter Felt (1745–1817) was one of six Felt brothers who served in the American Revolution, including at the Battle of Lexington and Concord; all survived, though two were wounded. Peter was a sergeant at the Battles of Saratoga. His son and namesake, Peter Felt Jr. (1784–1866), was a New Hampshire State Representative and among the early settlers of Quincy, Illinois, where he helped found a church.

== See also ==
- Mill Creek, a watercourse in today's Falmouth Foreside which was originally named Felt's Brook
