= Payson House at Thornhurst =

Historic house in Maine, United States

- U.S. National Register of Historic Places
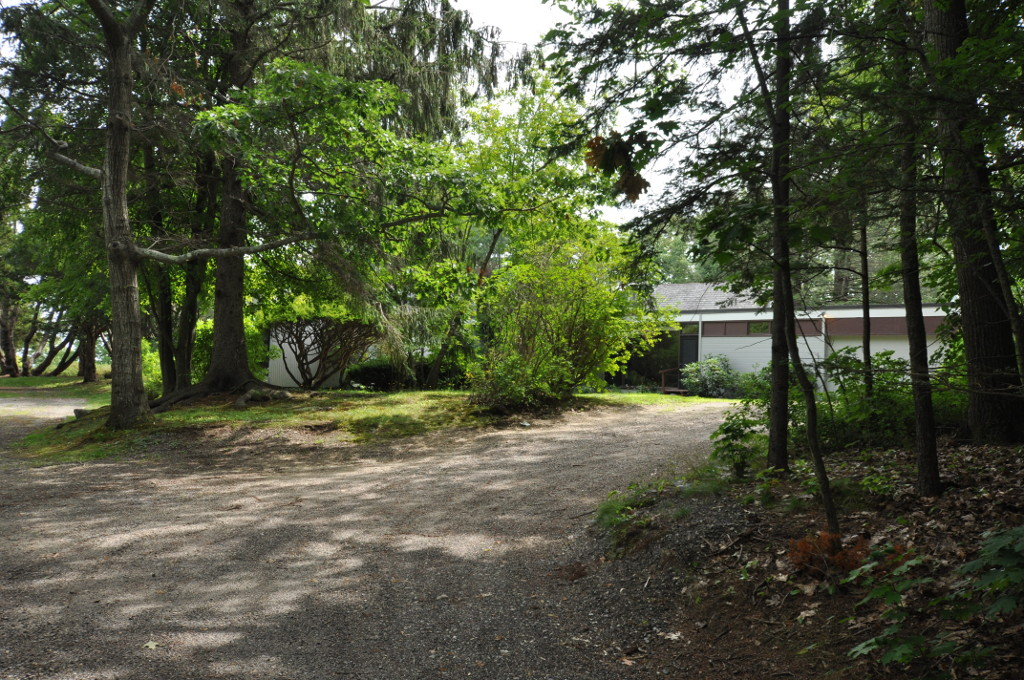

- Location within Maine Location within the United States
- Location: 48 Thornhurst Rd., Falmouth, Maine
- Coordinates: 43°42′56″N 70°13′7″W
- Area: 4.9 acres (2.0 ha)
- Built: 1952
- Architect: Serge Chermayeff
- Architectural style: Modern Movement
- NRHP reference No.: 05000057
- Added to NRHP: February 15, 2005

The Payson House at Thornhurst is an historic house at 48 Thornhurst Road in Falmouth, Maine. A Modernist structure, it was built in 1952, to a design by Serge Chermayeff, and is his only known commission in the state. It was listed on the National Register of Historic Places in 2005.

== Description and history ==
The Payson House is located on Falmouth's Casco Bay coast, set on a spit of land called Bartlett Point that juts north into the bay on the south side of the mouth of Mill Creek. The house is a single story structure with a roughly T-shaped layout. Most of the exterior consists of a series of units, each with a floor-to-ceiling plate glass window and door, surmounted by a white panel and set above a wooden platform. These units are separated by gray-painted vertical board siding. The sizes of these units roughly correspond to the size of the rooms they enclose, with the largest forming the outside of the living room. The interior of the house is unpretentiously finished, with flat white and gray finishes and hardwood flooring.

The house was built in 1952, to a design by Serge Chermayeff, and enlarged in 1972 to a design by Chermayeff's son Peter that was part of the original design vision. The house is the only known Chermayeff commission in Maine, and it is one of a small number of Modern movement buildings in the state. Integral to Chermayeff's design are the landscaping and views of the bay. The property on which it stands had long been in the Payson family, who had torn down a large and dilapidated Victorian (called "Thornhurst") in 1952, in order to make way for a more modern year-round residence. The Paysons, whose son attended school with Chermayeff's son Ivan, gave Chermayeff freedom to create a design that met their requirements.

== See also ==
- National Register of Historic Places listings in Cumberland County, Maine
