= Mendon Township =

Mendon Township may refer to:

- Mendon Township, Adams County, Illinois
- Mendon Township, Clayton County, Iowa
- Mendon Township, Michigan
- Mendon Township, Chariton County, Missouri

== See also ==
- Mendon (disambiguation)
