= Salem Gunpowder Raid =

1775 British standoff with colonists

- Part of the American Revolutionary War
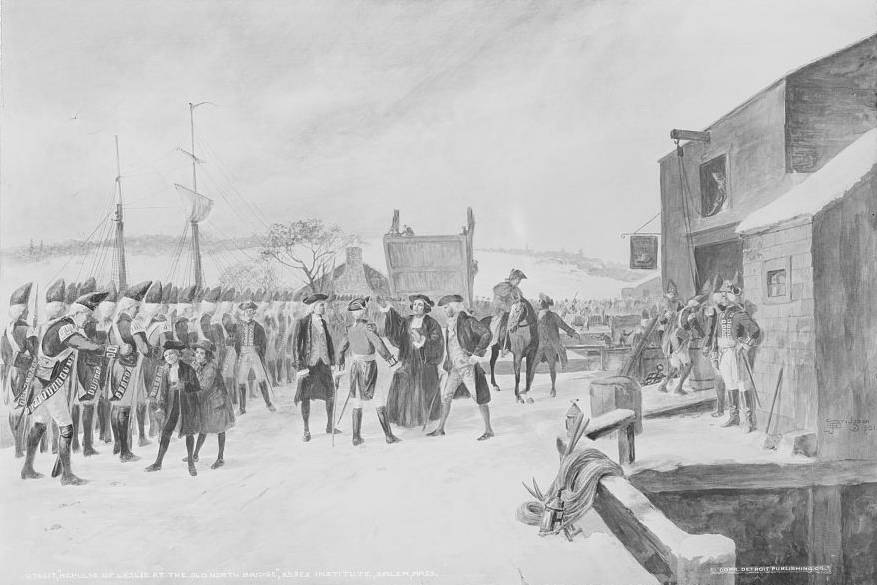
- A sketch of Leslie's Retreat, by Frederick Arthur Bridgman
Date	February 26, 1775
Location	Salem, Massachusetts 42.5248°N 70.8993°W
Result	American victory: British forces retreat

Belligerents
Great Britain	Massachusetts Bay

Commanders and leaders
(Kingdom of Great Britain) Alexander Leslie	

Units involved
(Kingdom of Great Britain) 64th Regiment of the Line	

Strength
300	Unknown

Casualties and losses
None	None

The Salem Gunpowder Raid (also known as Leslie's Retreat) refers to a February 1775 standoff between the British military and colonists in the town of Salem, Massachusetts, which ended peacefully, without a gun being fired and by a compromise agreement. It is considered by some historians to be the first armed resistance against British authority.

== Background ==
On Sunday, February 26, 1775, the 64th British Regiment of the Line, Lieutenant-Colonel Alexander Leslie commanding, landed at Marblehead from Castle William in Boston Harbor. The Marblehead people were at afternoon service. The regiment, with loaded muskets and bayonets fixed, marched to Salem under orders to seize military stores concealed there.

== Confrontation ==
As soon as its destination was known, Major John Pedrick of Marblehead rode to Salem and gave the alarm. Arriving at Salem, where the movement was delayed at New Mills by the tearing up of the bridge over South River, the troops were guided by a Loyalist towards "North Fields," a section reached by a drawbridge over North River. Here they found the bridge raised to arrest their progress. Some flatboats lying in the stream were promptly scuttled by their owners in the face of the troops. Across the river, a large number of people were gathering, armed as opportunity offered.

Colonel Timothy Pickering, then a young militia officer (afterwards Secretary of War and Secretary of State under Washington), was among them. Parson Thomas Barnard, hastening from his pulpit in the nearby North Church, had reached the spot and was trying to mediate.

The Honorable Richard Derby, whose ships' guns, loaned to the Province, were the objects of the search, and Colonel David Mason, the Provincial agent for mounting them for the field, were present, insisting, as did Captain James Barr, Major Joseph Sprague, and others who had disabled the flatboats, that Colonel Leslie was marching not on the King's highway, but in a private lane, that the bridge was the property of individual proprietors, that the draw would not be let down on his order, and that, as neither war nor martial law had been declared, he would advance at his peril. "Find the guns, if you can," said Derby. "Take them, if you can. They will not be surrendered." Leslie said his orders were to cross the river, and he would do so. Meanwhile the guns had been removed to a safer place, and a mounted messenger, Benjamin Daland, had posted to Danvers, spreading the alarm. The concourse of citizens was fast increasing, and help was arriving from Beverly and Danvers.

Captain John Felt, of the local militia and a descendant of the English emigrant George Felt, said to Leslie, "If you do fire, you will all be dead men!" He was called "the hero of the British repulse at the North Field Bridge."

== Negotiation ==
Night was approaching, and at dusk Colonel Leslie agreed that, if the draw should be lowered, he would march but a few rods beyond, abandon the search, and withdraw his regiment. The terms were accepted and observed. The regiment returned to Marblehead through streets lined with armed men, and re-embarked for Boston. Their march had been arrested and their purpose defeated.

Edmund Burke summed up the situation in these words: "Thus ended their first expedition, without effect, and happily without mischief. Enough appeared to show on what a slender thread the peace of the Empire hung, and that the least exertion of the military power would certainly bring things to extremities."

Robert S. Rantoul, a 19th-century mayor of Salem, having made researches in the matter of the history of Leslie's retreat, expressed surprise that the historian Dr. Bentley, in his voluminous notes, had made no mention of it; yet it was of sufficient importance for Burke to set it down in his magazine published in England at that time as "the first military enterprise of the colonies."

It seems that Leslie was held and delayed at the bridge by a quibble raised as to whether the bridge was a portion of the King's highway or private property. During this delay the cannon in North Fields were removed, and thus saved to the patriots.

He stated that this bridge was originally built by the town, but, as it proved of slight advantage except to landowners on the other side, the town apportioned it off in small sections to the proprietors of the land, for them to care for, reserving, however, some eighteen feet and the draw as town property. This would indicate that most of the bridge was private property at the time of Colonel Leslie's visit, but that the draw was town property.

== Legacy ==
The town of Salem erected a monument to the event, which states: "In the Revolution, the first armed resistance to the Royal Authority was made at this bridge, 26 Feb. 1775 by the people of Salem. The advance of 300 British Troops, led by Lt. Col. Leslie and sent by Gen. Gage to seize munitions of war, was here arrested."

In 2006, the dog park along Bridge Street in Salem was named after the event.

In 2025, semiquincentennial celebrations were held in Salem to honor the event. The Smithsonian published the article "Was This Little-Known Standoff Between British Soldiers and Colonists the Real Start of the American Revolution?" on February 26, 2025. Articles appeared in The Boston Globe and The Daily Hampshire Gazette.

== See also ==
- Sarah Tarrant
