= Adrienne Porter Felt =

American computer scientist

Adriana Porter Felt
- Born: Adrienne Porter Felt
- Education: University of California, Berkeley
- Occupation: Computer scientist

Adriana Porter Felt is an American computer scientist.

== Education ==
Porter Felt completed her PhD at UC Berkeley in 2012. Her dissertation research focused on computer security on mobile devices. Her advisor was David A. Wagner. Her 2011 paper on Android permissions security won the ACM SIGSAC test-of-time award in 2022.

== Career ==
After graduation, Porter Felt joined Google. Her most well-known work there focuses on computer security and Google Chrome. In 2014, she developed malware warnings in Chrome that are more intuitive for users. In 2016, she noted that the Google Chrome HTTPS lock icon looks more like a red purse than a lock. She conducted a study to design a more intuitive icon, and the new icon was deployed to users. This work earned her recognition from the MIT Technology Review as one of their "Innovators Under 35." In 2018, she worked on improvements to emoji in Google Chrome. After working as a Director of Engineering for the Chrome team, she joined Google DeepMind as a Principal Engineer.

== Personal life ==
Porter Felt's father, Edward Porter Felt was killed in the September 11 attacks. Through her father, she's a member of the Felt family descended from George Felt of Casco Bay.

She is on the Board of Directors for Second Harvest of Silicon Valley.
