= Trisha Beck =

American politician

Member of the Utah House of Representatives from the 48th district
- In office January 1, 2009 – December 31, 2010
- Preceded by: Sylvia Andersen
- Succeeded by: LaVar Christensen
- In office 1997 – December 31, 2002
- Succeeded by: LaVar Christensen

Personal details
- Born: October 1, 1952 (age 73) Salt Lake City, Utah
- Party: Democratic

Trisha Beck (born October 1, 1952) is an American politician who served in the Utah House of Representatives from the 48th district from 1997 to 2002 and from 2009 to 2010.
