= Mendon =

Mendon may refer to:

== Places in the United States ==
- Mendon, Illinois, a village
- Mendon, Massachusetts, a town
- Mendon, Michigan, a village
- Mendon, Missouri, a city
- Mendon, New York, a town
- Mendon, Ohio, a village
- Mendon, Utah, a city
- Mendon, Vermont, a town
- Mendon Township (disambiguation)
- Mendon Peak

== People ==
- Lalaji Mendon, Indian politician
- Mendon Morrill (1902–1961), United States federal judge
