= New Ipswich Academy =

Historic private academy in New Ipswich, New Hampshire

Coordinates: 42.7554°N 71.8510°W

New Ipswich's early academy building

New Ipswich Academy (also known as New Ipswich Appleton Academy) was an historic private academy in New Ipswich, New Hampshire, which operated from 1789 to 1968, then re-opened privately from 1969 to 1974.

== History ==
The New Ipswich Academy was chartered in 1789 and was later renamed Appleton Academy after benefactor Samuel Appleton, the largest early donor to the school. It was the second oldest academy chartered in New Hampshire after Phillips Exeter Academy in Exeter. New Ipswich Academy had a close relationship with Dartmouth College in Hanover. It would also serve as high school for the nearby communities of Mason and Greenville. The academy closed in 1968. In 1969, construction of Mascenic Regional High School was completed in New Ipswich.

In 1969, Appleton Academy became a college-preparatory private school for boys, run by Charles Markham, formerly a football coach at Brown University and educator at The Winchendon School. Several students came from the local community, and the remainder came from throughout the United States and as far away as Jamaica. Appleton consisted of grades 9-12 and postgraduate students. Appleton was known for its fine preparatory education as well as its sports programs. Their 1970 football team was undefeated, un-tied and un-scored upon, scoring no less than 50 points per game and only fielding 15 players. Appleton played other prep schools like (Phillips Exeter Academy, Mt Hermon, Deerfield, Vermont Academy as well as others) throughout New Hampshire, Vermont and Massachusetts. Appleton remained open from 1969 until 1974, when financial stresses caused its closure. The Concord Savings Bank had made a $250,000 loan to Appleton, which it defaulted on in 1976, resulting in foreclosure.

In 2012, the site of the former academy was taken over by the Center for Information, Technology & Society (CITS), an educational nonprofit organization, to be the site of its K-12 education programs and to provide Boynton Middle School students with learning projects. The center's main mission is to provide internships and experiences under two programs oriented to Mascenic students: STEM (Science, Technology, Engineering and Math) related learning, centered on historical artifacts contrasted to modern techniques; and book discussion and writing/reading groups, with local librarians.

== Notable alumni ==
- Jesse Appleton (1772–1819), first president of Bowdoin College
- Nathan Appleton (1779–1861), congressman, philanthropist
- Samuel Bell (1770–1850), governor, U.S. senator
- Abijah Bigelow (1775–1860), congressman from Massachusetts
- Henry Ames Blood (1836–1900), poet, playwright
- Jonas Chickering (1798–1853), founder of Chickering Piano Company
- Peter Felt (1784-1866), New Hampshire, politician, abolitionist and Illinois pioneer
- Augustus Addison Gould (1805–1866), Harvard professor, collaborator with Louis Agassiz
- John Taylor Jones (1802–1851), early Christian missionary to Thailand
- Henry W. Merriam (1828–1900), industrialist
- Amasa Norcross (1824–1898), congressman from Massachusetts
- Elizabeth Augusta Russell (1832-1911), philanthropist and reformer
- Robert Smith (1802–1867), congressman from Illinois
- John J. Taylor (1808–1892), congressman
- James Wilson II (1797–1881), congressman
- Levi Woodbury (1789–1851), governor of New Hampshire
