= Bloomfield, Adams County, Illinois =

Bloomfield, Illinois
- Census-designated place
- Location within Illinois Location within the United States
- Coordinates: 40°01′02″N 91°18′09″W
- Country: United States
- State: Illinois
- County: Adams

Area
  - Total: 0.53 sq mi (1.36 km^{2})
  - Land: 0.52 sq mi (1.35 km^{2})
  - Water: 0.0039 sq mi (0.01 km^{2})
- Elevation: 696 ft (212 m)

Population (2020)
  - Total: 32
  - Density: 61.5/sq mi (23.76/km^{2})
- Time zone: UTC-6 (Central (CST))
  - Summer (DST): UTC-5 (CDT)
- Area code: 217
- FIPS code: 17-06565
- GNIS feature ID: 2804082

Bloomfield is an unincorporated community and census-designated place in Ellington and Mendon Townships, Adams County, Illinois, United States. Bloomfield is located on Illinois Route 336 about 9 miles (14 km) north of Quincy.

Bloomfield was platted ca. 1837.

== Geography ==
According to the 2021 census gazetteer files, Bloomfield has a total area of 0.53 square miles (1.37 km^{2}), of which 0.52 square miles (1.35 km^{2}) (or 99.05%) is land and 0.01 square miles (0.03 km^{2}) (or 0.95%) is water.

== Demographics ==
Historical population
Census	Pop.	Note	%±
2020	32		—
U.S. Decennial Census

Bloomfield first appeared as a census designated place in the 2020 U.S. census.

As of the 2020 census there were 32 people, 18 households, and 18 families residing in the CDP. The population density was 60.95 inhabitants per square mile (23.53/km^{2}). There were 14 housing units at an average density of 26.67 per square mile (10.30/km^{2}). The racial makeup of the CDP was 96.88% White, and 3.13% from other races.
