= McKay Christensen =

American baseball player (born 1975)

- Outfielder
- Born: August 14, 1975 (age 50); Upland, California, U.S.
- Batted: Left Threw: Left

MLB debut
- April 6, 1999, for the Chicago White Sox

Last MLB appearance
- April 7, 2002, for the New York Mets

MLB statistics
- Batting average: .250
- Hits: 32
- Home Runs: 2
- Stats at Baseball Reference

Teams
- Chicago White Sox (1999–2001); Los Angeles Dodgers (2001); New York Mets (2002)

McKay Andrew Christensen (born August 14, 1975) is an American former Major League Baseball outfielder.

Christensen played for three different ballclubs during his career: the Chicago White Sox (1999–2001), Los Angeles Dodgers (2001), and New York Mets (2002). He made his Major League Baseball debut on April 6, 1999. Christensen last played in a Major League game on April 7, 2002, and is now retired and working as a real estate developer.

Christensen is a member of the Church of Jesus Christ of Latter-day Saints, and reportedly passed up a million-dollar signing bonus in order to serve a mission in Japan. Christensen was originally drafted by the California Angels and was traded to the White Sox while in Japan as a missionary.

== Personal life ==
Christensen's parents are Stephen LaMar Christensen (b. 1949 in Provo, Utah) and Victoria Ann "Vicki" (née Swan) Christensen (b. 1948 in Los Angeles County, California). His uncle is Utah politician F. LaVar Christensen, and his 3rd great-grandfather is Nathaniel H. Felt, a member of the first Utah State Legislature.
