= Ebenezer Fletcher =

American Revolutionary War soldier and memoirist

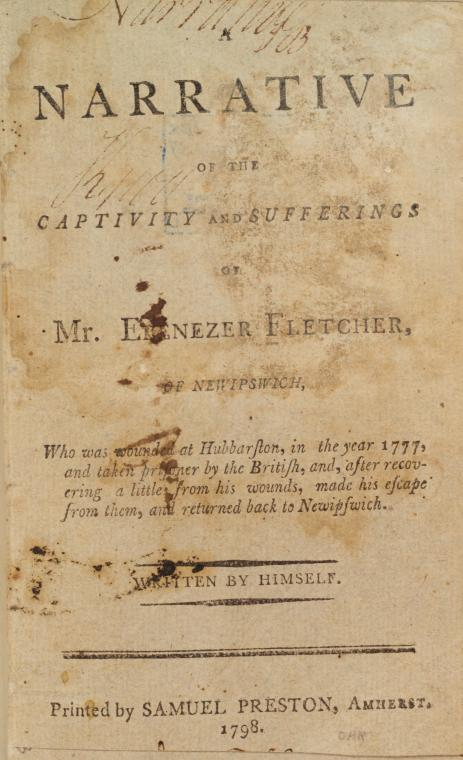
A narrative of the captivity and sufferings of Mr. Ebenezer Fletcher, cover page, 1798

Ebenezer Fletcher (1761–1831) was an American Revolutionary War fifer who was captured by the British Army at the Battle of Hubbardtown (Vermont), during the Saratoga Campaign. He entered the Continental Army in the 2nd New Hampshire Regiment under Col. Nathan Hale.

Young Fletcher at age 16 was wounded and captured during the battle, which was part of the American retreat from the Siege of Fort Ticonderoga. He made his escape from his British captors and was then forced to serve his contractual three years by the Continental Army.

After the war, Fletcher returned to the place of his birth, New Ipswich, New Hampshire, where he married (twice), owned and managed textile mills, and raised a family in a home that still stands at Smithville.

One of his daughters, Polly, married Peter Felt, the third great-grandson of first-generation colonist George Felt.

In 1798, Fletcher wrote A narrative of the captivity and sufferings of Mr. Ebenezer Fletcher; who was wounded at Hubbardton, in the year 1777 and taken prisoner by the British, and after recovering a little from his wounds, made his escape from them, and returned back to New Ipswich, written by himself. The account was first published by Samuel Preston in Amherst, New Hampshire, and has since been published numerous times, including an edition for the American bicentennial.

Fletcher's narrative has become "emblematic" of the life of a young, curious and reluctant common Revolutionary War soldier.
