= Sylvia Andersen =

American politician

Sylvia Skinner Andersen was a Republican member of the Utah House of Representatives for the 48th House district (which largely consists of Sandy, Utah) from 2006 to 2008. Andersen was a member of the Utah Legislative Cultural Caucus.

Andersen was defeated in the Republican caucus by LaVar Christensen, who had been the state representative for the district until he ran for the United States House against Jim Matheson in 2006.

== Other activities ==
Andersen is the CEO of the N.E.C. Group, a company that runs home shows in Utah and California. She also holds a position in the Sandy Chamber of Commerce.
