= Sarah Tarrant =

Nurse of Salem, Massachusetts, United States

- Born: 1743; Province of Massachusetts Bay
- Died: May 13, 1828 (aged 84–85); Salem, Massachusetts, U.S.

Sarah Tarrant (1743 – May 13, 1828, in Salem, Massachusetts) was a nurse. She is remembered for her bravery in challenging the British soldiers who occupied Salem during military actions prior to the American Revolutionary War.

On Sunday, February 26, 1775, a battalion of British infantry, under Lieutenant Colonel Alexander Leslie, was sent to Salem to look for colonial weapons. Sarah Tarrant shouted at them from a window, "Go home and tell your master he sent you on a fool's errand and has broken the peace of our Sabbath. Do you think we were born in the woods, to be frightened of owls?" A soldier aimed his musket at her, and she dared him, "Fire, if you have the courage, but I doubt it." No shots were fired, and the British, having found no weapons, left the town.
