= Mendon, Missouri =

City in Chariton County, Missouri, United States

- City
- Location of Mendon, Missouri
- Coordinates: 39°35′26″N 93°8′2″W
- Country: United States
- State: Missouri
- County: Chariton

Area
  - Total: 0.18 sq mi (0.46 km^{2})
  - Land: 0.18 sq mi (0.46 km^{2})
  - Water: 0 sq mi (0.00 km^{2})
- Elevation: 705 ft (215 m)

Population (2020)
  - Total: 163
  - Density: 908.3/sq mi (350.68/km^{2})
- Time zone: UTC-6 (Central (CST))
  - Summer (DST): UTC-5 (CDT)
- ZIP code: 64660
- Area code: 660
- FIPS code: 29-47288
- GNIS feature ID: 2395094

Mendon is a city in western Chariton County, Missouri, United States. The population was 163 at the 2020 census. It is 21 miles (34 km) northwest of the county seat Keytesville and 13 miles (21 km) north of Brunswick, Missouri, on Missouri Route 11.

== History ==
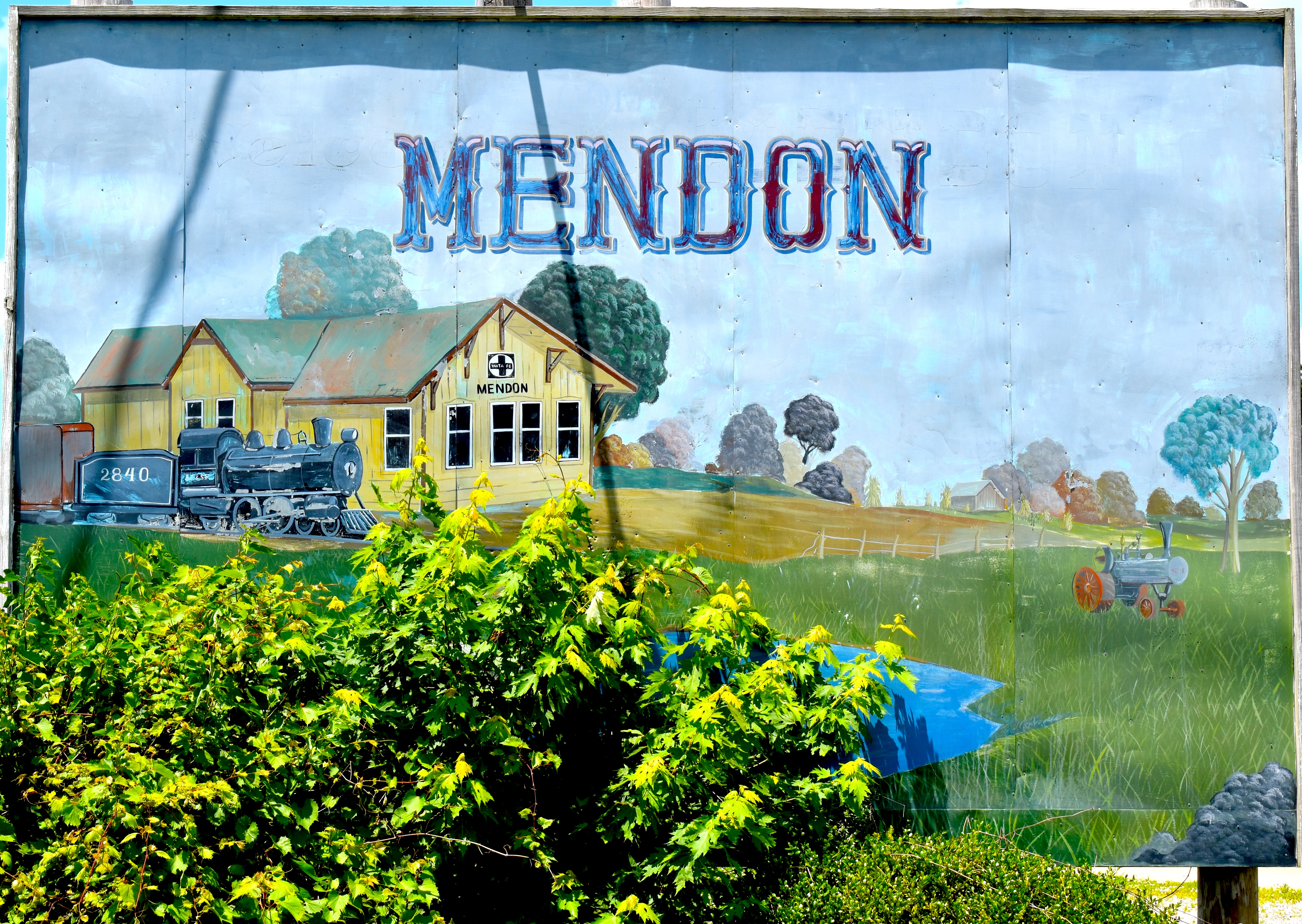
City Sign, Mendon, Missouri, 2020

Mendon was laid out a mile and a quarter from its current location in 1871 by Christopher Shupe. Shupe named it for his previous home place, Mendon, Illinois, which incorporated in 1867 and was named for Mendon, Massachusetts, incorporated precisely two centuries earlier, in 1667.

The Missouri area had been known as "Salt Creek", and businesses were in operation several years prior to the town plat actually being filed. Among the earliest was a general store built around 1865 by Mr. Bostich and Mr. Eastman. A Methodist church was erected in 1866. A sawmill was located five miles east of the town.

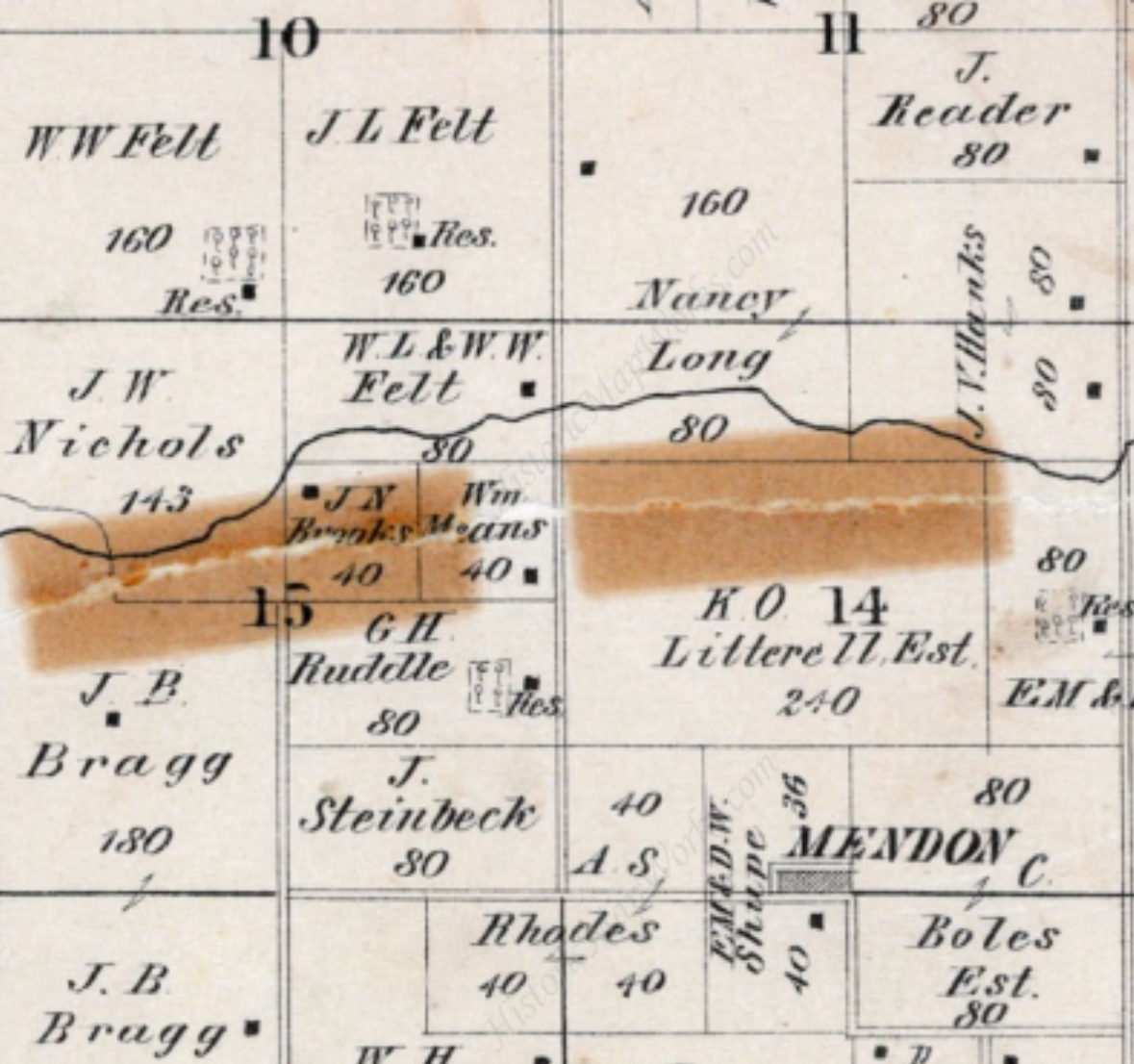
1876 plat map showing Old Mendon and Felt family acreage at site of New Mendon, which would develop 12 years later, in 1888

In 1867, Jeremiah Andrews Felt, of Quincy, in Adams County, Illinois, not far from Mendon Township, sent his twin sons, William Winsor Felt and Winslow Leach Felt, aged 22, with their 16-year-old brother George Washington Felt, to establish farms on 80 acres to the northwest of where the original Mendon would be laid out four years later in 1871. The Felt twins later acquired 320 acres from the Hannibal & St. Joseph Railroad, and were named as "farmers and stock-raisers being among the first settlers of the area." Their brother George went to Iowa. Then, Winslow Leach, his wife Annetta Brown, and son Arthur Stanley all died. After their deaths, Charles Davis Felt (1858-1949), the youngest of the Felt brothers, arrived by 1880 to take over the farm.

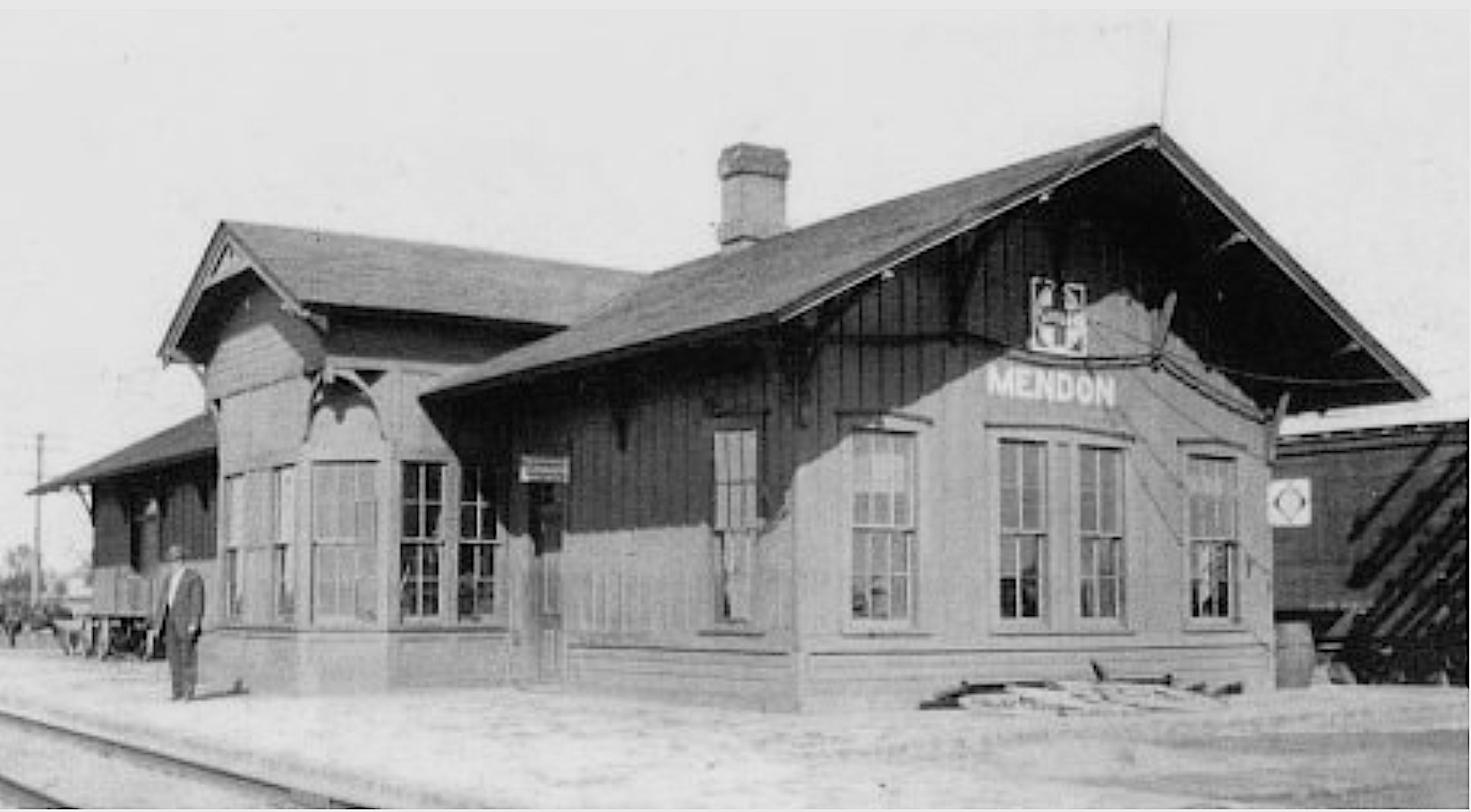
Mendon Railroad Depot and Passenger Station, about 1910. Passenger trains stopped here into the 1980s. It was demolished.

A few years later, the Chicago, Santa Fe and California Railway, a subsidiary of the Atchison, Topeka and Santa Fe Railway, projected that their rail line would pass by the village, but over a mile away. Citizens were faced with a monumental choice: to remain or move closer to the railroad. On January 13, 1888, the Mendon Land & Trust purchased land from the Felt brothers and a new Mendon was created at the current site; the former location was mostly abandoned. The Felts donated a parcel upon which the high school was built for the blossoming community.

"The new town was laid out consisting of 20 square blocks. The town sits parallel to the railroad tracks and thus isn't square north and south. Businesses started to move from Old Mendon and the town began to prosper. In 1890, the Articles of Corporation were filed and accepted by the County Court. Mendon Cemetery is still where it was in 1860, a part of Old Mendon. The post office began operation in 1872 and continued today."

Sebastian Joseph bought Lot No. 16 in Block 3 for $145.00 on the following conditions: "That intoxicating liquors shall never be bargained, sold, bartered, traded or otherwise disposed of as a beverage in any place of public resort in or on said premises." If these conditions should be violated, the property would revert back to the Land Company. Frank Newcomer and a Mr. Holworthy put up the first buildings. Newcomer started a lumber yard and hardware store. Later Eli Ward started an implement business, and businesses from "Old Mendon" began to move to the new town.

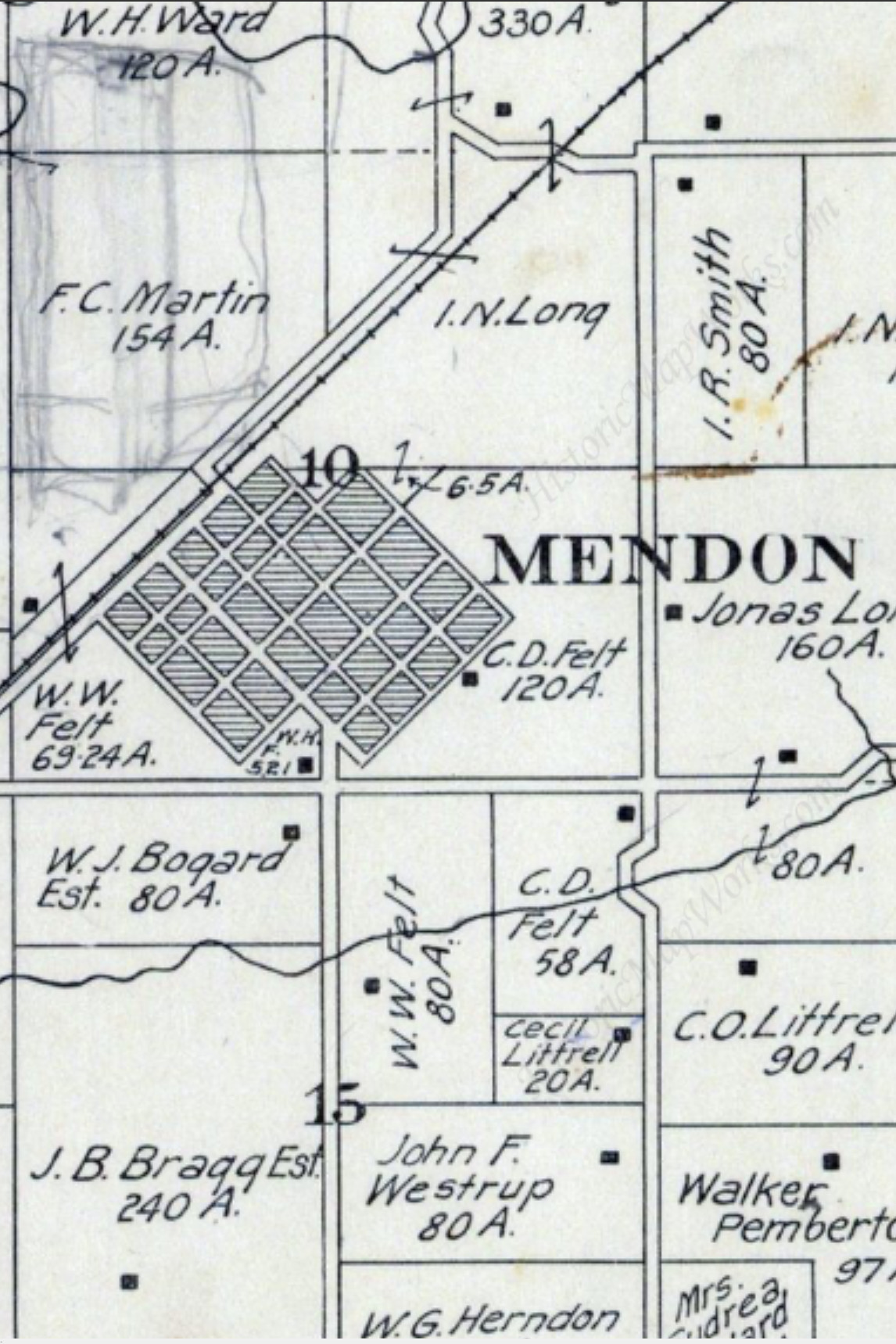
Plat map showing New Mendon and Felt family acreage, Chariton County, 1915

The year following the city's move, in 1889, Emil Loew, a harness maker from Tramelan, Switzerland, and his wife, German-British Mary Groetecke, arrived in Mendon from Brookfield to set up a shop and home. Their daughter Bernah married Chester Arthur Felt, son of Charles Davis Felt and Lydia McCarl, in 1909, both resided in Mendon until their deaths. Their sons were Arthur Emil Felt and Charles Woodrow Felt.

"The town site originally belonged to William and Charles Felt...Later Eli Ward embarked in the implement business, and the business interests of Old Mendon began to move to the new town…. It had a church, public school, a bank, two hotels, a newspaper, The Citizen, and about twenty other businesses, both large and small, including shops and stores. Population 1899: 350."

A newspaper, the Mendon Citizen, was first published in 1886. By 1899, the community contained over 20 stores, a school, a bank, and two hotels.

The estimated population in the late 1890s was 350 residents. Its population in 1910 was 408 residents.

=== Today ===
On June 27, 2022, Amtrak's Southwest Chief derailed nearly a mile southwest of Mendon, after hitting a dump truck. The city and surrounding community were applauded for their assistance to the injured. "There were farmers, off-duty nurses, truck drivers, soccer moms, Little League coaches and grade-schoolers. They were doling out food, first aid, bottled water and, most importantly, phone chargers."

A full year before the tragedy, a Mendon resident met with Chariton County engineers and stakeholders to warn them of the dangerous "steep incline leading up to the crossing." The crossing remains closed as of June 2023.

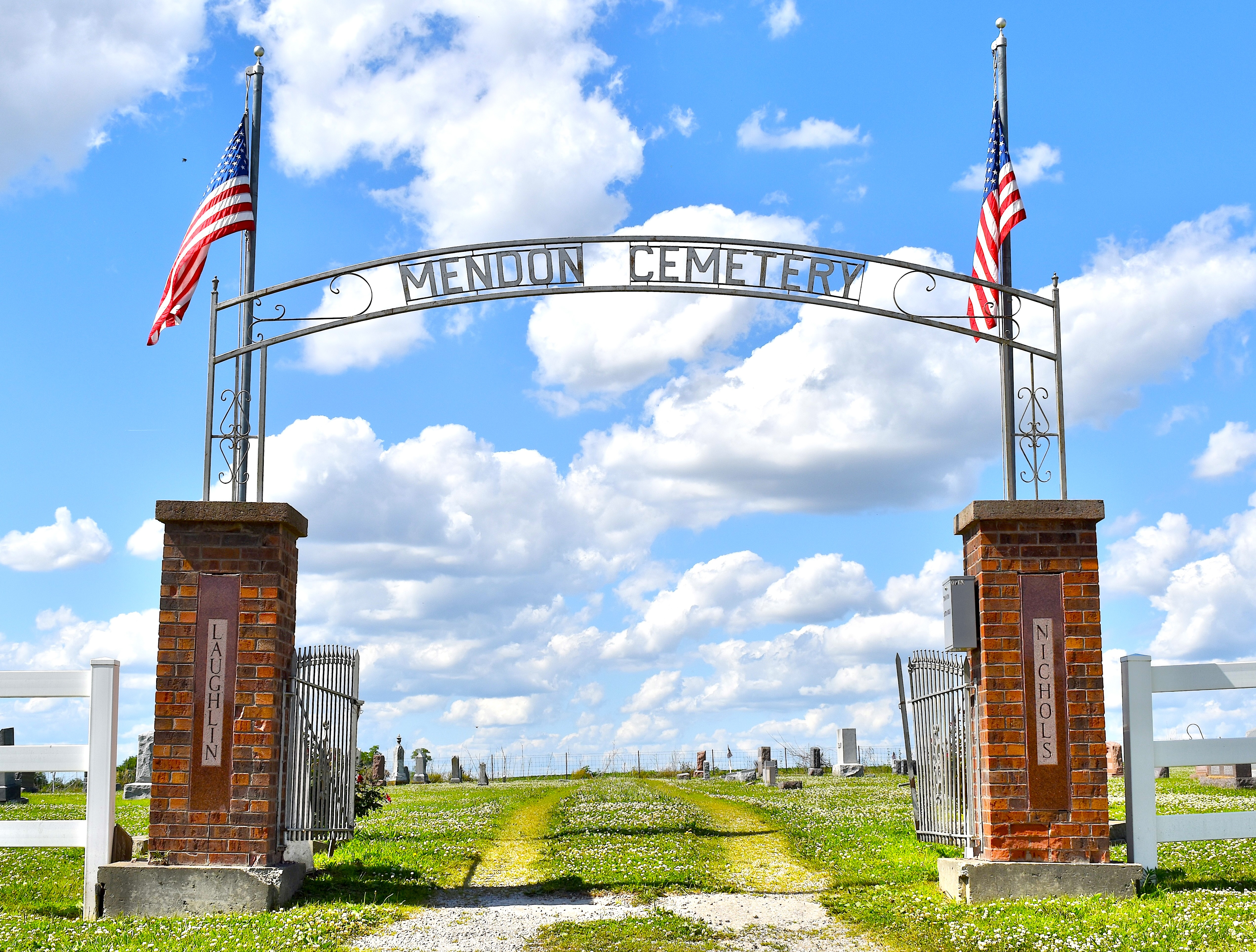
Mendon Cemetery, established 1860, at the site of the original Old Mendon, Missouri, 2020

Although freight trains on the Santa Fe railroad still pass through regularly, little remains of Mendon's business community.

Education for the town and surrounding rural area is provided by Northwestern High School. The school's athletic and academic teams compete in Missouri Class 1, the smallest of all classifications.

Mendon's proximity to the Swan Lake National Wildlife Refuge has proven a source of income for the community, with business catering to waterfowl hunters who come to the region.

== Geography ==
Mendon is located in western Chariton County on Missouri Route 11. Yellow Creek flows past the northwest side of the town and the Swan Lake National Wildlife Refuge is two miles west. The Atchison Topeka and Santa Fe Railroad line passes the northwest side of the community. This line is now owned by the BNSF Railway as the Southern Transcon. The Amtrak Southwest Chief passes through without stopping.

According to the United States Census Bureau, the city has a total area of 0.18 square miles (0.47 km^{2}), all land.

== Demographics ==
Historical population
Census	Pop.	Note	%±
1890	137		—
1900	252		83.9%
1910	408		61.9%
1920	387		−5.1%
1930	376		−2.8%
1940	350		−6.9%
1950	349		−0.3%
1960	287		−17.8%
1970	289		0.7%
1980	252		−12.8%
1990	207		−17.9%
2000	208		0.5%
2010	171		−17.8%
2020	163		−4.7%
U.S. Decennial Census

=== 2010 census ===
As of the census of 2010, there were 171 people, 81 households, and 48 families living in the city. The population density was 950.0 inhabitants per square mile (366.8/km^{2}). There were 104 housing units at an average density of 577.8 per square mile (223.1/km^{2}). The racial makeup of the city was 98.8% White and 1.2% African American.

There were 81 households, of which 23.5% had children under the age of 18 living with them, 53.1% were married couples living together, 4.9% had a female householder with no husband present, 1.2% had a male householder with no wife present, and 40.7% were non-families. 35.8% of all households were made up of individuals, and 19.8% had someone living alone who was 65 years of age or older. The average household size was 2.11 and the average family size was 2.73.

The median age in the city was 40.5 years. 21.1% of residents were under the age of 18; 8.7% were between the ages of 18 and 24; 24.5% were from 25 to 44; 19.9% were from 45 to 64; and 25.7% were 65 years of age or older. The gender makeup of the city was 46.2% male and 53.8% female.

=== 2000 census ===
As of the census of 2000, there were 208 people, 92 households, and 57 families living in the city. The population density was 1,171.6 inhabitants per square mile (452.4/km^{2}). There were 115 housing units at an average density of 647.7 per square mile (250.1/km^{2}). The racial makeup of the city was 98.08% White, 0.48% Native American, and 1.44% from two or more races.

There were 92 households, out of which 31.5% had children under the age of 18 living with them, 55.4% were married couples living together, 5.4% had a female householder with no husband present, and 38.0% were non-families. 35.9% of all households were made up of individuals, and 18.5% had someone living alone who was 65 years of age or older. The average household size was 2.26 and the average family size was 3.00. There are an average of 7.4 dogs per capita in this city and they are free to run wild around the town.

In the city the population was spread out, with 25.0% under the age of 18, 8.7% from 18 to 24, 26.0% from 25 to 44, 23.6% from 45 to 64, and 16.8% who were 65 years of age or older. The median age was 38 years. For every 100 females, there were 84.1 males. For every 100 females age 18 and over, there were 81.4 males.

The median income for a household in the city was $31,875, and the median income for a family was $33,281. Males had a median income of $32,969 versus $15,417 for females. The per capita income for the city was $14,537. About 6.3% of families and 7.6% of the population were below the poverty line, including 10.3% of those under the age of eighteen and 7.1% of those 65 or over.

== Notable people ==
- Mendon is the hometown of former MLB pitcher Vern Kennedy, who is buried at Old Mendon Cemetery.

== See also ==
- List of cities in Missouri
