= Nathaniel H. Felt =

American politician

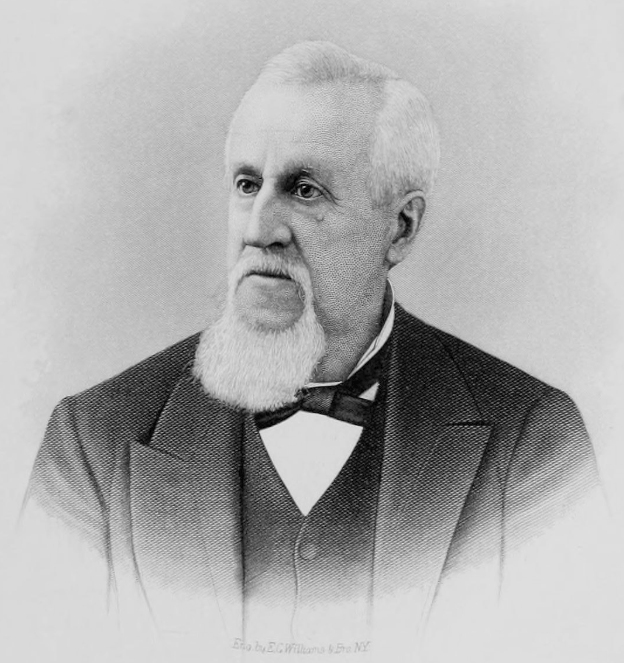
- Born: Nathaniel Henry Felt; February 6, 1816; Salem, Massachusetts
- Died: January 27, 1887 (aged 70); Salt Lake City, Utah
- Occupations: Tailor, church leader, politician
- Spouses: Eliza Ann Preston (m. 1839) Sarah Strange (m. 1854) Mary Louisa Pile (m. 1856)
- Children: 17

Nathaniel Henry Felt (February 6, 1816 – January 27, 1887) was a member of the Utah Territorial Legislature and a mid-level leader of the Church of Jesus Christ of Latter-day Saints in the 19th century.

== Early life ==
Felt was born in Salem, Massachusetts to Nathaniel Felt and his wife the former Hannah Reeves. The older Felt died when Nathaniel H. was seven. Felt studied in local schools and was a member of the Divisionary Corps of Independent Cadets until age 15 when he became an apprentice to a tailor in Lynn, Massachusetts. He also clerked from about age 14 in a Salem, Massachusetts retail store for Mr. Benjamin Cox. With the aid of an older brother, John Gillingham Felt, he at age 21 set up a tailor shop with multiple employees and was then involved in trade with China and parts of west Africa. Felt's ancestry in Salem was deep and well-connected having descended from George Felt, who first arrived in Salem in the year 1628 with John Endecott. On October 3, 1839 Felt married his second cousin Eliza Ann Preston. Both Nathaniel and Eliza were descendants of Bridget Bishop. The well-connected Felt family had many relatives in town and nearby; one of the most luminary examples was Joseph Barlow Felt who was Nathaniel's much older first cousin and often-cited Massachusetts historian.

== Earliest Latter Day Saint involvement ==
On September 17, 1843 the Felts were baptized as members of the Church of Jesus Christ of Latter Day Saints, primarily as a result of the missionary work of Erastus Snow. A likely attendee at the baptism ceremony was Brigham Young, future President of the LDS Church. who became a lifelong associate of Nathaniel and Eliza. In March 1844, Felt was ordained president of the Salem Branch of the Church by Erastus Snow. In late spring 1844, Brigham Young sent his teenage daughter Vilate from Nauvoo, Illinois with Augusta Adams Cobb to live with the Felts in Salem in order for her to obtain a proper education. By June 1844, Brigham Young and Wilford Woodruff were frequent visitors in the Felt home during their efforts to elect Joseph Smith Jr president of the United States. When Smith was murdered at Carthage, Illinois, Brigham Young returned to Nauvoo and became leader of The Church of Jesus Christ of Latter-day Saints.

In late Spring 1845 the Felts moved to Nauvoo and donated carpets and furniture to be used as furnishings in the Nauvoo Temple. While in Nauvoo he was the tailor for Brigham Young, John Taylor and many other Mormon leaders in the city. Felt was involved in the Battle of Nauvoo serving under the overall command of Daniel H. Wells. Shortly after this Felt became ill and so went to St. Louis, Missouri to try to regain his health, this was in the fall of 1846.

== St. Louis branch presidency ==
In February 1847 Felt was appointed president of the St. Louis Branch of The Church of Jesus Christ of Latter-day Saints. By this time the branch numbered well over 800 members. Largely due to emigration from elsewhere but also as a result of baptisms there the branch was growing even more. In March 1847 the St. Louis Conference (roughly equivalent to a District in present LDS Church organization) was organized by Felt into six ecclesiastical wards with governing council of twelve bishops to oversee emigration and relief for the poor. With areas outside St. Louis added to the Conference's jurisdiction it soon had between 3,000 and 10,000 Latter-day Saints under its watch. Besides various branches in St. Louis, Felt also supervised branches in Alton, Illinois and Gravois. Felt also oversaw the purchasing of supplies for and the chartering of steamboats for the British Mormons who would stop in St. Louis on their way to Utah. Another major activity of Felt while in St. Louis was giving priesthood blessings, visiting and comforting the sick, and other such things during the cholera epidemic after the great fire of 1849. In the end, Felt proved himself valuable to Brigham Young who used him for many other assignments in the following years.

== Move to the Utah Territory ==
After serving as St Louis conference president for slightly more than three years, Felt was released in 1850 and started west with his wife and three children. He crossed the plains in the Edward Hunter Company which included the Heywood and Woolley Church Merchandise Train managed by Joseph L. Heywood and Edwin D. Woolley and primarily consisted of wagons carrying goods bought by the Church to try to avoid paying exorbitant rates charged by some merchants in Utah. Nathaniel would have been familiar with such enterprises having descended from great grandfather Jonathan Felt whose sons David and John Felt ran a successful shipping business from Salem.

Felt arrived in Utah in October 1850 and was appointed an alderman of Salt Lake City in January 1851 by Brigham Young. In August 1851 Felt was elected to the first Utah Territorial Legislature. During the early 1850s he also helped George A. Smith in founding the town of Parowan, Utah. In the same year Felt was called as a traveling bishop of the LDS Church, with the assignment to instruct local bishops in various locations on the proper methods of processing and recording tithing and other donations.

In 1852 Felt was appointed chaplain of the Nauvoo Legion (the name then used by the Utah Territorial Militia) with the rank of colonel and standing on the general staff. In 1854 Felt entered the practice of plural marriage, marrying Sarah Strange as his second wife. In 1854-1856 Felt served as a missionary in New York City where he served as assistant editor of The Mormon under John Taylor. During Felt's journey back from New York he intercepted the tragic handcart companies of 1856 including the Willie and Martin group.

== Later life ==
Later in 1856 Felt married his third and last wife, Mary Louisa Pile. He was the father of 17 children. In 1858 Felt received a contract to supply grain to Camp Floyd. He set up a grain distribution system with locations in Salt Lake City, Nephi, Utah and Ephraim, Utah. When President Abraham Lincoln died, Felt served on a committee to honor the president's life. Soon thereafter when the Speaker of the United States House of Representatives, Schuyler Colfax, visited Salt Lake City with Massachusetts gadfly reporter Samuel Bowles, Nathaniel H. Felt was one of their hosts. Of Felt it was written, "Perhaps the most refined man of our hosts in personal appearance and manners was a Mr. Felt, originally from Salem, Mass.; he lived in a very neat two-story cottage, embowered with trees, and with two or three suggestive front doors." The suggestive front doors referred to polygamy as the reason for having more than one front door.

From 1865 to 1867 Felt served a mission to Great Britain, for part of this time serving as president of the London District. From November 1869 to May 1870 Felt served a mission in New England.

Felt maintained regular correspondence to local newspapers and the Salem Gazette in his hometown. His personality tended toward sharing news and opinion through letters; many of which have been saved by the Historians Office of the Church of Jesus Christ of Latter-day Saints and others. He crusaded vigorously in favor of the practice of plural marriage after 1854 (including a formal "remonstration" to congress) and he watched political matters closely. He was elected several times as either alderman or member of the city council in Salt Lake. As he aged his health declined, but he maintained employment as a cashier for ZCMI. Felt was an active contributor to Salem's Essex Institute (now Peabody Essex Museum) where several of his donations can be accessed including an 1842 edition of the Book of Mormon and a large patent document from England. Nathaniel Henry Felt died at his home in Salt Lake City on Thursday, January 27, 1887.

His 2nd great-grandson is Utah politician F. LaVar Christensen, and 3rd great-grandson is former Major League Baseball player McKay Christensen.
