= Galvin Memorial Park =

Park in Charlestown, Boston, Massachusetts, U.S.

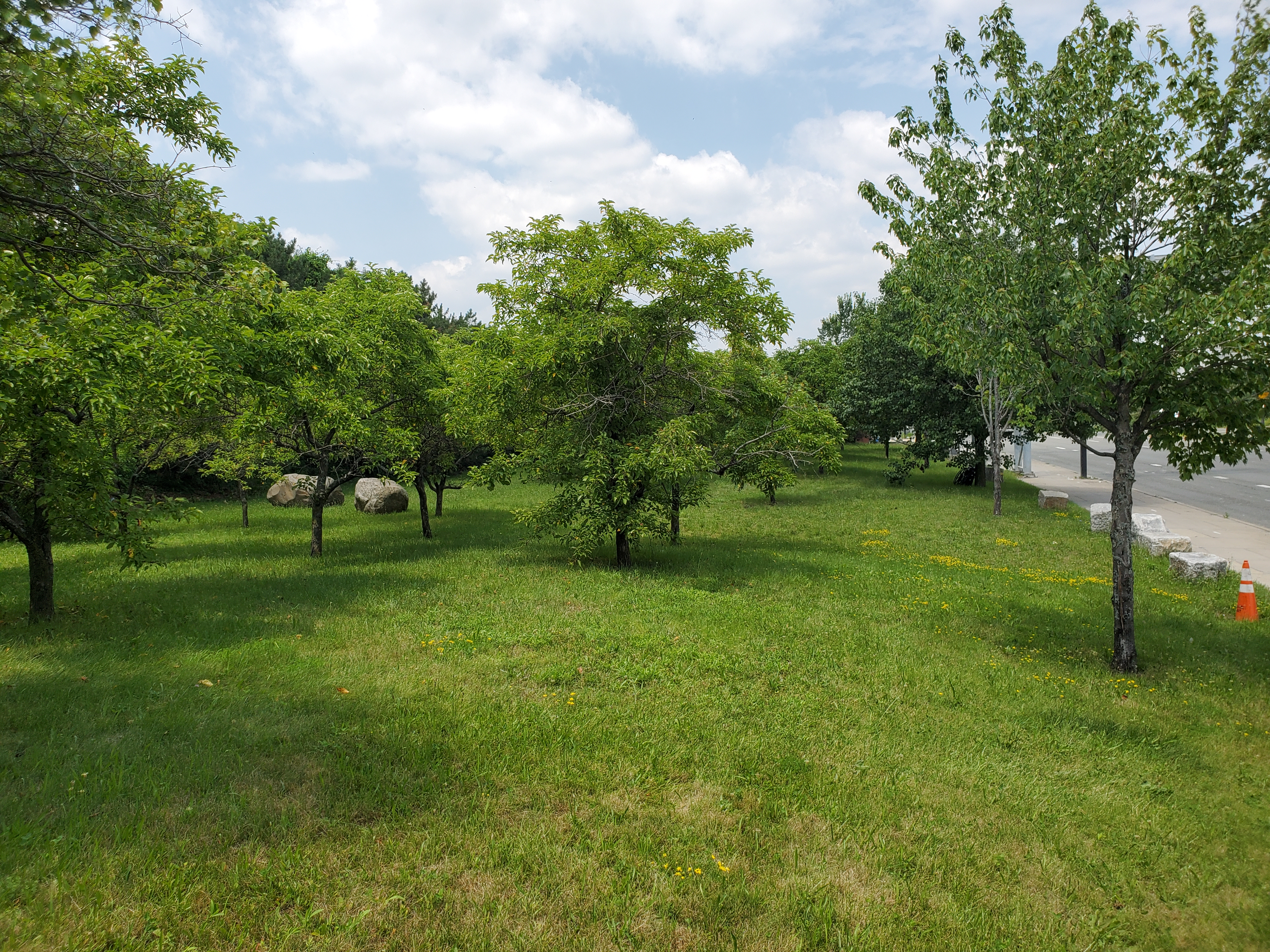
- Galvin Memorial Park in July 2021

- Location within Boston
- Type: Park
- Nearest city: Charlestown, Boston
- Coordinates: 42°22′18″N 71°3′52″W

Galvin Memorial Park is a park at the edge of Charlestown, Boston, in the U.S. state of Massachusetts. The park features a statue of General Michael Joseph Galvin.

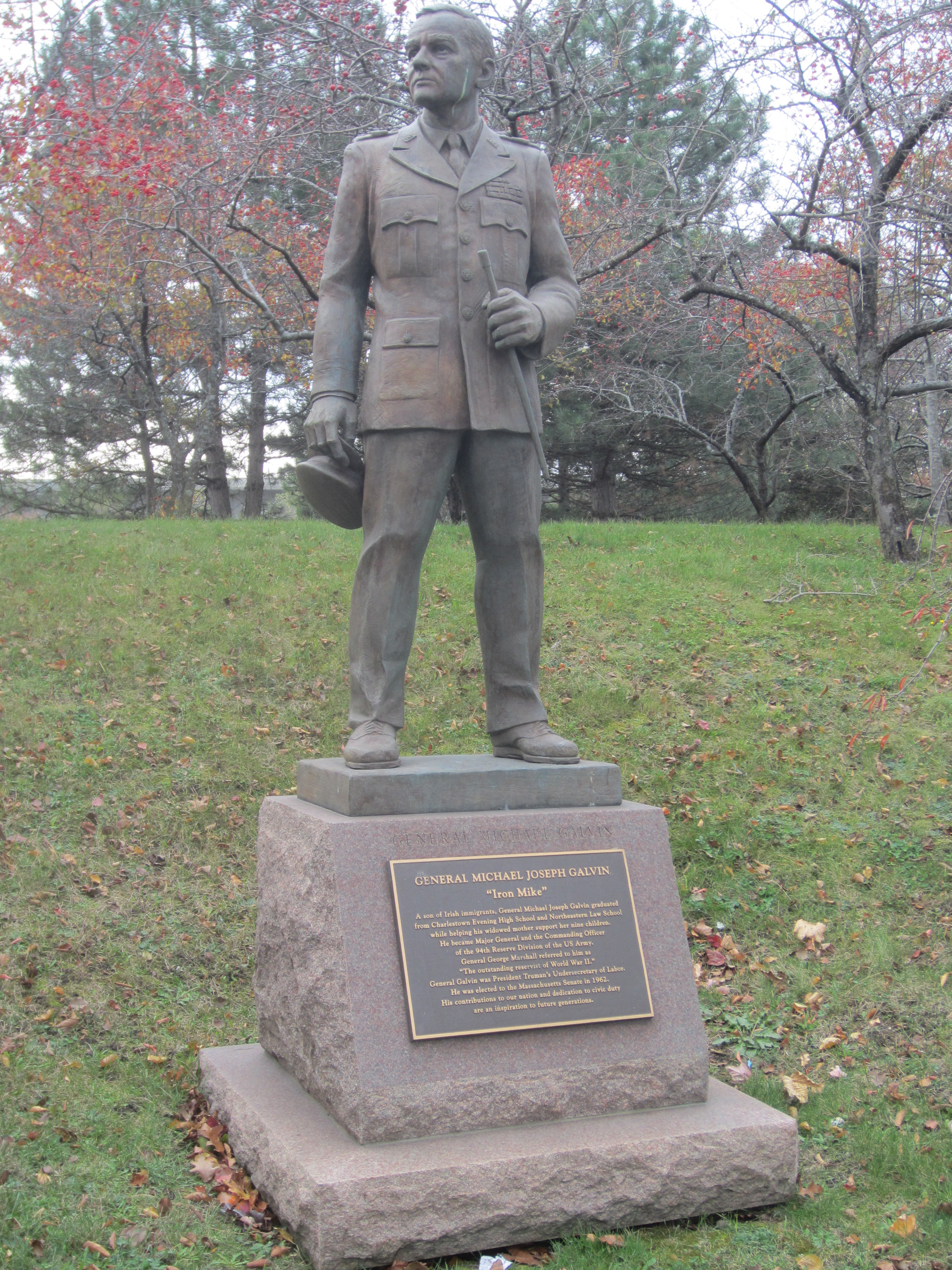
Statue of Galvin, 2019

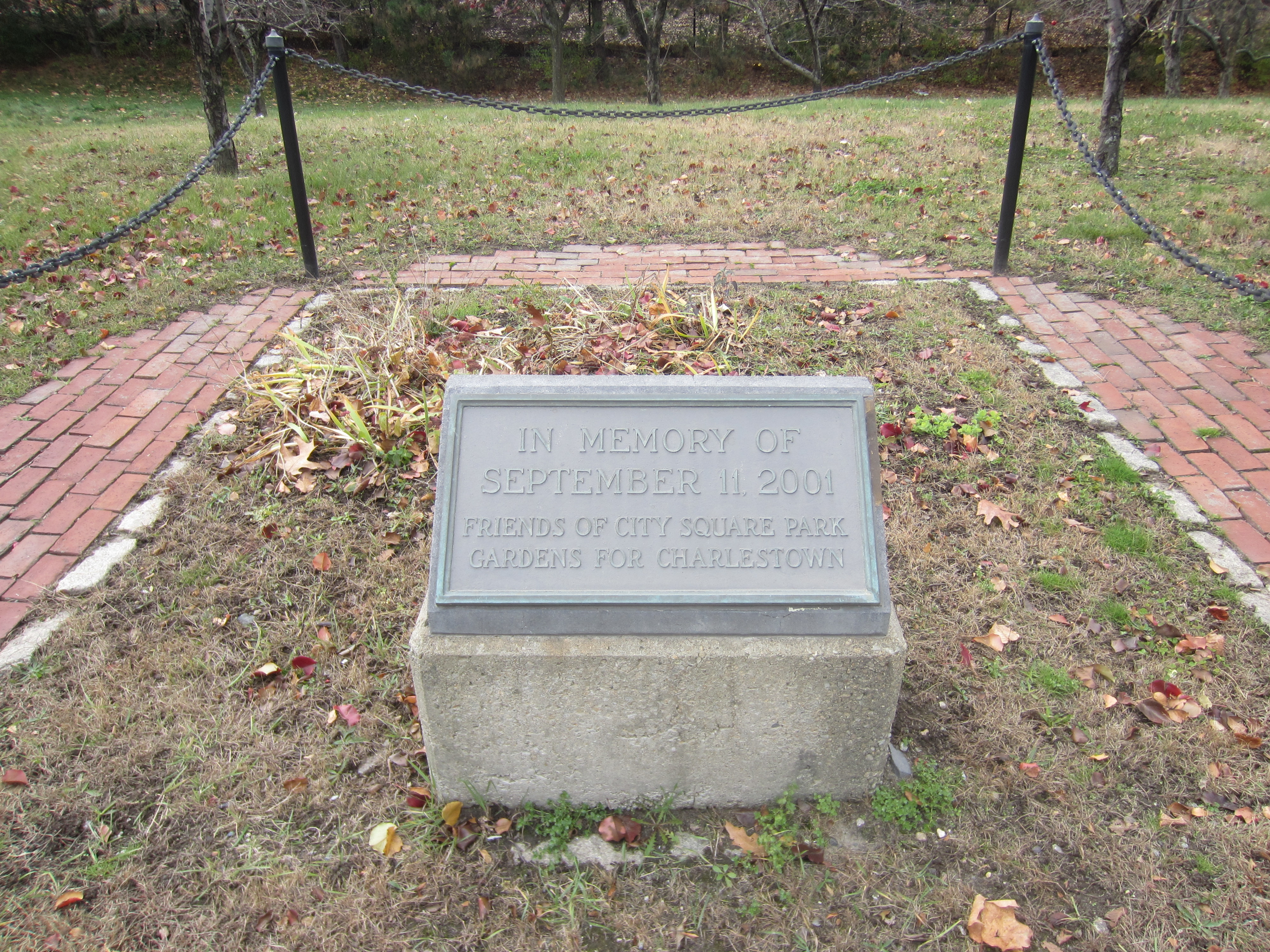
Plaque, 2019
