= LaVar Christensen =

American politician (born 1953)

Fred LaVar Christensen
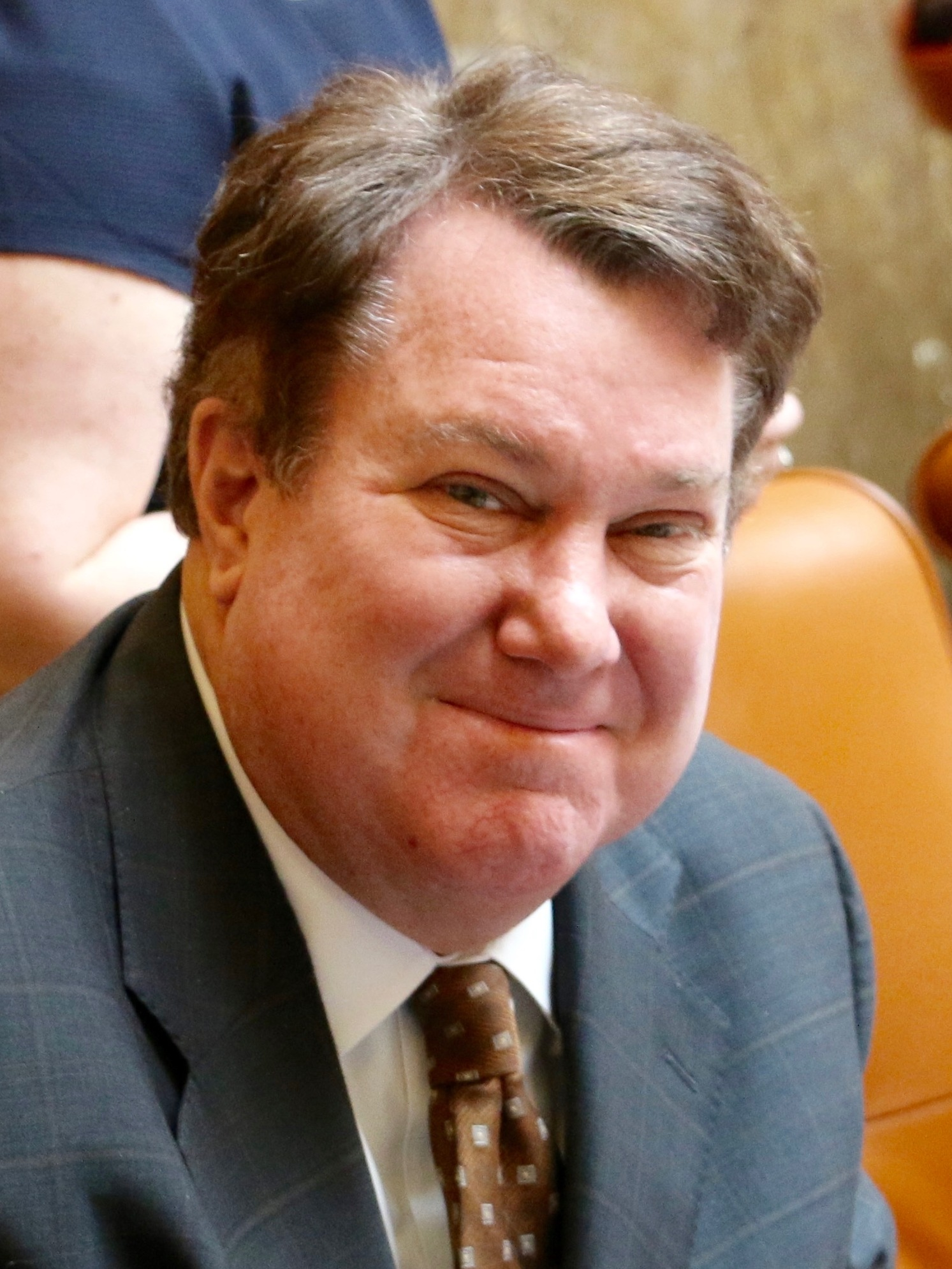

Member of the Utah House of Representatives from the 32nd district
- In office January 1, 2011 – December 31, 2018
- Preceded by: Trisha Beck
- Succeeded by: Suzanne Harrison
- In office January 1, 2003 – December 31, 2006
- Preceded by: Trisha Beck

Personal details
- Born: August 18, 1953 (age 73) Fontana, California
- Party: Republican
- Education: Brigham Young University
- Profession: Attorney

Fred LaVar Christensen (born August 18, 1953), known as LaVar Christensen, is an American politician from Utah, who served as a Republican state representative from the state's 48th district. He served from January 1, 2003, through December 31, 2006, and again from January 1, 2011, through 2018.

== Early life and career ==
Christensen was born in Fontana, California and raised in Upland, California but his family is originally from Utah. His parents were James LaMar Christensen (1928–1988) and Glenna (née Simmons) Christensen (1928–2017). His younger brother, James Michael Christensen, died in 2006 at age 49. Another brother, Stephen LaMar Christensen (b. 1949), is the father of former Major League Baseball player McKay Christensen.

His great-great-grandfather, Nathaniel H. Felt, was a member of Utah's first territorial House of Representatives. Christensen is an attorney with a legal background in real estate development. He received his B.A. degree from Brigham Young University and his Juris Doctor from the University of the Pacific, McGeorge School of Law in Sacramento, California. While in law school, he was a legislative assistant for the Governor of California and student intern for Judge Rothwell B. Mason. He is married to Susan Kay Christensen. They have three children. Christensen is a member of the Church of Jesus Christ of Latter-day Saints.

== Political career ==
Christensen was the Republican nominee for U.S. Congress in Utah's 2nd congressional district (map). Christensen was defeated by the incumbent, Jim Matheson, in the 2006 mid-term election and subsequently left the Utah House of Representatives. However, Christensen filed his candidacy with the Lieutenant Governor's office in March 2008 to run for the same Utah House seat he vacated in 2006. In May 2008, he defeated the incumbent, Representative Sylvia Andersen, who took over the seat in 2006, at that year's GOP nominating convention and was the party's nominee in the general election for that cycle.

Christensen was elected to the Utah State House of Representatives (District 48 in Sandy/Draper) in 2002. His committee assignments included Vice-Chair of Education, Budget Appropriations for Public Education, Law Enforcement and Criminal Justice; Chair of Judicial Rules Review Committee and member of the Constitutional Revision Commission.

2006 While Christensen won in several lesser-populated counties, he lost in traditional Republican strongholds, such as San Juan County, Daggett County, and Emery County. He lost the largest county: Salt Lake County, Utah by 49,264 votes and was unable to make up such a large vote deficit. Christensen campaigned in 2006 as the Republican candidate in a traditionally Republican district. Like Matheson's Republican challengers in the past, Christensen's advertisements focused primarily on party affiliation and national issues. His campaign motto was "America Needs Utah". His advertisements frequently mentioned that Nancy Pelosi would become Speaker of the House if the Democrats won a majority.

2008 Christensen's opponent in 2008 for Utah State House District 48 was Trisha Beck, who narrowly defeated him.

2010 Christensen challenged Trish Beck again in 2010, this time winning the general election by 652 votes.

2012 Christensen defeated Austin Linford in the Republican convention and faced Democratic Party nominee Alain Balmanno in the general election. Christensen won with 10,940 votes (66.8%) to Balmanno's 5,426 (33.2%).

2014 Christensen again defeated Austin Linford in the Republican convention and faced Democratic Party nominee Alain Balmanno in the general election. Christensen won with 5,915 votes (63.9%) to Balmanno's 3,340 (36.1%).

2016 Christensen was challenged by Democrat Suzanne Harrison in the 2016 general election. Initial returns indicated a win for Harrison, but final vote tallies gave Christensen the win by just 3 votes. As of November 29, 2016, Harrison had formally requested a recount, which was expected to be completed by December 6, 2016.

During the 2016 general session, Christensen served on the Public Education Appropriations Subcommittee, the House Education Committee and as committee chair of the House Judiciary Committee.

== 2016 sponsored legislation ==
Bill number	Bill title	Status
HB0057	Alternative Dispute Resolution Sunset Date Amendment	House/ to Governor - 3/16/2016
HB0220S01	Legislative Organization Amendments	Became Law w/o Governor's Signature - 3/30/2016
HB0320	Metro Township Revisions	Governor Signed - 3/10/2016
HB0336	Electricians Licensing Amendments	House/ filed - 3/10/2016
HB0375S03	Prescription Drug Abuse Amendments	Governor Signed - 3/25/2016
HB0377	Grandparent Rights Amendments	Governor Vetoed - 3/30/2016
HB0381S01	Standards for Issuance of Summons	Governor Signed - 3/22/2016
HB0393	Sovereign Marriage Authority	House/ filed - 3/10/2016
HB0399	Victims Rights Amendments	House/ filed - 3/10/2016
HB0414S01	Zoning Amendments	House/ filed - 3/10/2016

Christensen passed six of the ten bills he introduced, giving him a 60% passage rate. However, one of his bills that passed the Legislature was vetoed by the Governor. He also floor sponsored SB0079S04 Child Welfare Revisions.

== Political positions ==
In the Utah state legislature, Christensen had a relatively conservative voting record. He consistently fought against same-sex marriage and for pro-life causes. Christensen supports making the 2001 federal tax cuts permanent, supports easing restrictions on oil exploration in the Arctic National Wildlife Refuge, and opposes amnesty for illegal immigrants.

Christensen wrote a paper supporting his Constitutional Amendment for the Sutherland Institute. In this document, Christensen outlined his argument for Utah's successful Constitutional Amendment banning same-sex marriage.

He was named 2005 Statesman of the Year by the Salt Lake County Republican Party. Christensen also sponsored legislation that recognizes and strengthens parental rights in Utah as well as civic and character education in Utah's public schools.
