= Phillips Library (Massachusetts) =

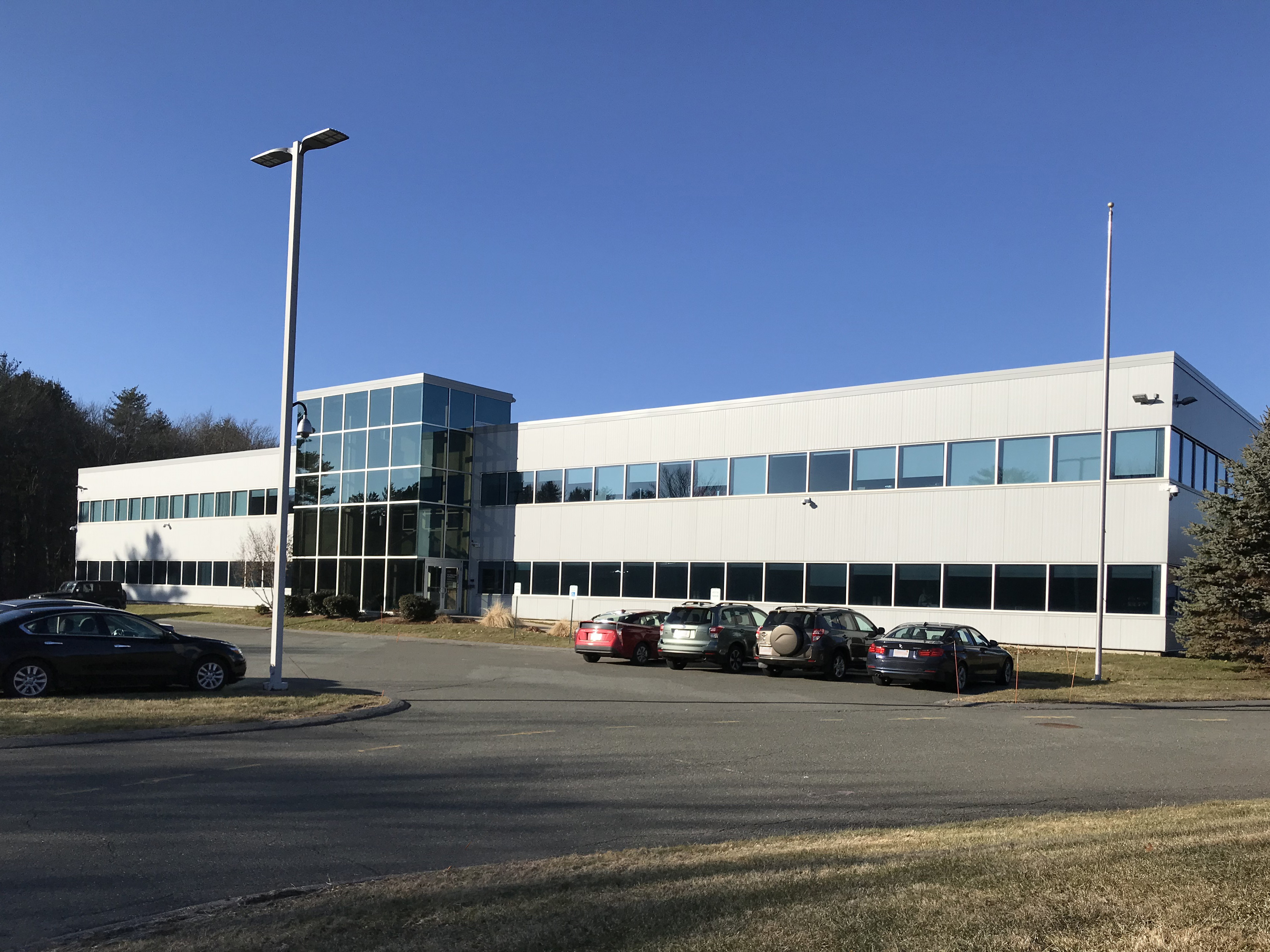
- Phillips Library at the Peabody Essex Museum Collection Center in 2018
- 42°42′49.02″N 70°54′30.85″W
- Location: 306 Newburyport Turnpike, Rowley, Massachusetts, United States
- Type: Special library
- Established: 2018

Collection
- Items collected: books, journals, newspapers, magazines, ephemera, maps, and manuscripts, art

Other information
- Employees: 8
- Website: https://www.pem.org/visit/library

Phillips Library
- Interactive map of the Phillips Library area

General information
- Location: Rowley, Massachusetts, 306 Newburyport Turnpike, Rowley, Massachusetts, United States
- Inaugurated: 2018
- Owner: Peabody Essex Museum

Design and construction
- Architecture firm: Ennead Architects

The Phillips Library of the Peabody Essex Museum (PEM) is a rare books and special collections library. It is made up of the collections of the former Peabody Museum of Salem and the Essex Institute (which merged in 1992 to form the Peabody Essex Museum). Both had libraries named for members of the Phillips family.

== Locations ==
The Phillips Library and Reading Room moved in 2018 to the Peabody Essex Museum Collection Center in Rowley, Massachusetts, a building which had once been the headquarters for the Schylling toy company.

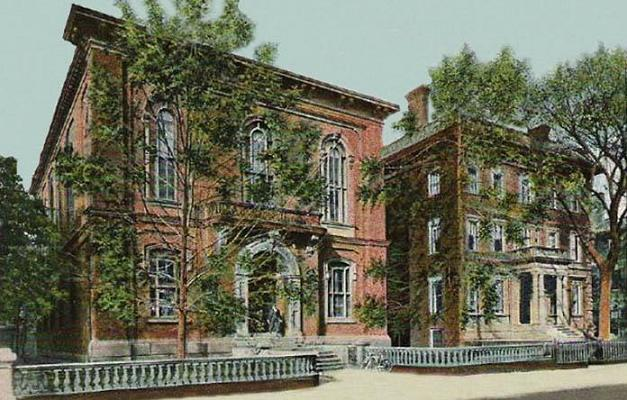
Plummer Hall and Daland House c. 1906

Formerly located in the Essex Institute Historic District of Salem, Massachusetts, the Phillips Library was in Plummer Hall on Essex Street, with offices in the connected John Tucker Daland House. Plummer Hall was originally built for the Salem Athenaeum in 1857. The Athenaeum provided for space for the Essex Institute and several other groups, and sold the building to the Essex Institute in 1907. The reading room, with its gold-leaf pillars and busts of Nathaniel Bowditch and George Peabody, underwent restoration in 1998. The library closed in November 2011 for an extensive $20 million "renovation and restoration of the library's John Tucker Daland House and Plummer Hall. The project also included the digitization of the library's catalog." Slated for completion in 2013, the Phillips Library reading room reopened in August 2013 at a temporary location—with limited access to materials—at 1 Second Street, Peabody, Massachusetts. On August 31, 2017, the library's temporary location in Peabody closed, noting: "all access to collections will be suspended from September 1, 2017, through March 31, 2018."

On December 8, 2017, Dan L. Monroe, PEM's Rose-Marie and Eijk van Otterloo, director and CEO, issued a press release announcing that the 42,000 linear feet of historical documents will be permanently relocated to Rowley, Massachusetts, and that Plummer Hall and Daland House, the two historic buildings which had housed the Phillips Library, will be utilized as office and meeting space. The move to Rowley allows the PEM to "provide the highest standards of preservation, care, and protection for the library collection" while offering space for its 1.8 million objects not currently on display at the museum. PEM "sank $15 million in the Rowley property between the site purchase and renovations. Many areas are still under construction, including a conservation lab, library digitization space, and a photography studio." The Phillips Library reading room opened in June 2018, with space for up to 14 researchers at a time.

The announcement of the planned movement of the Salem documents collection to the town of Rowley—located about 17 miles (27 km) north of the Peabody-Essex Museum—has sparked protests by historians and interested Salem citizens who don't accept that unique documents regarding Salem's history should reside outside the city. The Friends of Salem's Phillips Library formed in December 2017 after PEM announced it was moving Salem's largest and oldest archival collection from its permanent home at Plummer Hall to a collections center 40 minutes away and not accessible by public transportation.

== Collections ==
The Phillips Library is best known for holding the majority of the original 1692 Salem witchcraft trials papers (on deposit from the Massachusetts Supreme Judicial Court Archives) and early works by Nathaniel Hawthorne. Collection subjects include art and architecture, Essex County, maritime history, natural history, New England, voyages and travels, Asia, Oceania, and Native American culture. Some featured collections include the C. E. Fraser Clark Collection of Hawthorniana, the Frederick Townsend Ward Collection of Western-language materials on Imperial China, and the Herbert Offen Research Collection.
