= Alexander Leslie (British Army officer) =

Major general in the British Army during the American Revolutionary War

Major-General The Honourable Alexander Leslie
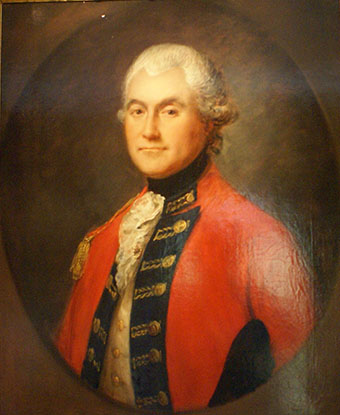
- Portrait by Thomas Gainsborough
- Born: 1731; England
- Died: 27 December 1794 (aged 62–63); Beechwood House, near Edinburgh, Scotland
- Military career
- Allegiance: Kingdom of Great Britain
- Branch: British Army
- Service years: 1753–1782
- Rank: Major-General
- Conflicts: American War of Independence; Battle of Long Island (1776); Landing at Kip's Bay (1776); Battle of Harlem Heights (1776); Battle of White Plains (1776); Battle of Princeton (1777); Battle of Monmouth (1778); Siege of Charleston (1780); Battle of Guilford Court House (1781); Battle of the Combahee River (1782)

Major-General Alexander Leslie (1731 – 27 December 1794) was a British Army officer during the American Revolutionary War. He was the commander of the British troops at the Battle of Harlem Heights. He replaced Cornwallis as commander in the South in 1782.

== Early life ==
Leslie was born in England in 1731 to Alexander Leslie, 5th Earl of Leven and, his second wife, Elizabeth Monypenny, daughter of David Monypenny of Pitmilly. From his father's first marriage to Mary Erskine, he had an elder half-brother, David Melville, 6th Earl of Leven. From his parents marriage, he had three sisters, the novelist Lady Mary Hamilton (wife of Dr. James Walker and George Robinson Hamilton), Anne Carnegie, Countess of Northesk (wife of George Carnegie, 6th Earl of Northesk), and Elizabeth Hope, Countess of Hopetoun (wife of John Hope, 2nd Earl of Hopetoun). His paternal grandfather was David Leslie, 3rd Earl of Leven.

== Career ==
He enlisted in the 3rd Foot Guards of the British Army in 1753. He was promoted to lieutenant-colonel of the 64th Regiment of Foot in 1766.

In 1775, before the American War of Independence broke out, he led troops to Salem, Massachusetts looking for contraband weapons. His advance was delayed by a standoff at a bridge, during which the colonists removed the weapons he was looking for. His force was eventually allowed to proceed, but found nothing of consequence, and was received with hostility during the expedition.

In 1776, Leslie was promoted to brigadier-general. He fought in the Battle of Long Island, the Landing at Kip's Bay, the Battle of White Plains and the Battle of Harlem Heights, the Battle of Princeton and the Siege of Charleston during the American War of Independence. At Princeton, his nephew, Captain William Leslie was mortally wounded.

In 1780, he was sent to the Chesapeake Bay by Sir Henry Clinton in order to "make a powerful diversion in [Earl Cornwallis's] favor by striking at the magazines then collecting by the enemy ... for supplying the army they were assembling to oppose him." He became major general in 1782 and was made Colonel of the 63rd (West Suffolk) Regiment of Foot the same year. He transferred in 1788 to be Colonel of the 9th (East Norfolk) Regiment of Foot to his death.

== Personal life ==
In 1760, he married Mary Tullidelph, a daughter of Dr. Walter Tullidelph of Tullidelph, in the County of Forfar, who had been a planter and member of the Council of the Island of Antigua. She died in 1761 in childbirth. Their daughter survived:

- Mary Ann Leslie (1761–1845), who married John Rutherfurd, MP for Roxburghshire and eldest surviving son of John Rutherfurd.

On 27 December 1794, on his way back to Edinburgh, Leslie was seized with a dangerous illness, and died at Beechwood House, about three miles west of Edinburgh, on 27 December 1794.

== See also ==
- List of British generals

Military offices
Preceded by Thomas Twisleton, 13th Baron Saye and Sele	Colonel of the 9th (East Norfolk) Regiment of Foot; 1788–1794	Succeeded by Albemarle Bertie, 9th Earl of Lindsey
Preceded by Francis Grant	Colonel of the 63rd (West Suffolk) Regiment of Foot; 1782–1788	Succeeded by George Waldegrave, 4th Earl Waldegrave
