= 78th Illinois Infantry Regiment =

78th Illinois Volunteer Infantry Regiment
- State Flag of Illinois
- Active: September 1, 1862, to June 7, 1865
- Country: United States
- Allegiance: Union
- Branch: Infantry
- Campaigns: Tullahoma Campaign; Chickamauga Campaign; Chattanooga campaign Atlanta campaign Sherman's March to the Sea; Carolinas campaign

The 78th Illinois Infantry Regiment was an infantry regiment that served in the Union Army during the American Civil War.

== History ==
The 78th Illinois Infantry Regiment was organized 3 years' service at Quincy, Illinois, along the Mississippi River, mustering in on September 1, 1862. The 78th Illinois then left the state by steamboat for Louisville, Kentucky, arriving on September 19, 1862. The regiment, would see all of its wartime duty in the Western Theater of the American Civil War.

The 78th Illinois was attached originally to 39th Brigade, 12th Division, Army of the Ohio. The regiment went through a series of reassignments; first in November 1862 to Gilbert's Command, District of Western Kentucky, Department of the Ohio. While in Franklin, Tennessee, in February 1863 the regiment was assigned to the Army of Kentucky, Department of the Cumberland. In June 1863, another reassignment assigned the 78th Illinois to the 2nd Brigade, 1st Division Reserve Corps, Army of the Cumberland. The final reorganization would come in October 1863, assigning the regiment to the 2nd Brigade, 2nd Division, XIV Corps.

The regiment received the blue United States uniform, typical of the Civil War. Initially, the regiment was armed with .69 caliber rifled muskets, altered to use a percussion cap. In 1863, the regiment saw more modern arms provisioned to the soldiers; a mixture of the Enfield rifle and Springfield Rifle Muskets were carried. In 1864, all troops were armed with the Springfield Rifle Muskets.

=== Timeline ===
==== Formation Period ====
September 1, 1862

Regimental Muster in Quincy, Illinois

September 19, 1862

Moved by steamboat from Quincy, Illinois, down the Mississippi River, then up the Ohio River to Kentucky

==== Defense of Kentucky Railroads ====
October 5, 1862 – January 30, 1863

Moved to Shephardstown, Kentucky and guard Louisville & Nashville Railroad; the main line trussel bridges running south from Shephardstown through Elizabethtown and a spur line between Bardstown Junction to New Haven. The regimental headquarters was primarily set in New Haven. The regiment was placed at several key bridges, splitting it apart having one to three companies guard each bridge.

December 28, 1862

Action at Muldraugh's Hill. Companies B and C were positioned at one of these bridges on December 28, 1862. General John Hunt Morgan’s cavalry fired artillery at the two companies, of which the Union companies had no artillery to return fire. Consequently, the two companies surrendered to Morgan and were paroled. They were first sent to the north at Louisville and then west to St. Louis, where they would be held at Benton Barracks until they could be exchanged.

December 30, 1862

Action against Company H at New Haven

January 30 – February 7, 1863

Moved to Nashville, Tennessee

==== Middle Tennessee Operations ====
February–June 1863

February 3, 1863

Repulse of Confederate General Nathan Bedford Forrest's attack on Fort Donelson, Tennessee

February 12 – June 23, 1863

Moved to Franklin, Tennessee

March 4, April 10 and June 4–5, 1863

Actions at Franklin

==== Tullahoma Campaign ====
June 24 – July 3, 1863

June 24–28, 1863

March to Triune, Murfreesboro and then to marching near Shelbyville

July 1, 1863

Occupation of Shelbyville and Middle Tennessee through August 1863

==== Chickamauga Campaign ====
August 16 – September 22, 1863

September 19–20, 1863

Battle of Chickamauga – On the final day of the battle, the 78th Illinois served a vital role as part of Mitchell's Brigade in reinforcing Thomas at the height of the Confederate attack and took 40% casualties

==== Chattanooga Campaign ====
September–November 1863

September 24 – November 23, 1863

Siege of Chattanooga, Tennessee

November 23–24, 1863

Tunnel Hill

November 24–25, 1863

Missionary Ridge – (Regiment temporarily attached to 15th Army Corps November 24)

November 26, 1863

Chickamauga Station

November 29 – December 17, 1863

March to relief of Knoxville

February 22–27, 1864

Demonstration on Dalton, Georgia

February 23–25, 1864

Tunnel Hill, Buzzard's Roost Gap and Rocky Faced Ridge

April 11–13, 1864

Reconnaissance from Rossville to La Fayette

==== Atlanta Campaign ====
May 1 – September 8, 1864

May 6–7, 1864

Tunnel Hill

May 8–11, 1864

Battle of Rocky Face Ridge

May 8–9, 1864

Buzzard's Roost Gap

May 9–13, 1864

Demonstration on Dalton

May 14–15, 1864

Battle of Resaca

May 17–18, 1864

Rome

May 19–25, 1864

Battle of Dallas

May 25–26, 1864

Battle of New Hope Church

June 9 – July 3, 1864

Battle of Marietta

June 11–14, 1864

Pine Mountain

June 15–17, 1864

Lost Mountain

June 27, 1864

Battle of Kennesaw Mountain – The regiment participated in an unsuccessful and costly assault on the Confederate position on Cheatham Hill.

July 4, 1864

Ruff's Station, Smyrna Camp Ground

July 5–17, 1864

Chattahoochee River

July 19–20, 1864

Battle of Peach Tree Creek

July 22 – August 25

Battle of Atlanta

August 5–7, 1864

Battle of Utoy Creek

August 25–30, 1864

Flank movement on Jonesboro

August 31 – September 1, 1864

Battle of Jonesboro – The 78th Illinois was in Baird's Division, which spearheaded the successful attack on the Confederate line

September 2–6, 1864

Lovejoy Station

Operations In North Georgia and North Alabama against Forest and Hood (September 29 – November 3, 1864)

October 6–8, 1864

Florence

==== Sherman's March to the Sea ====
November 15 – December 21, 1864

December 10–21, 1864

Siege of Savannah.

==== Carolinas Campaign ====
January–April 1865

March 16, 1865

Battle of Averasborough – Taylor's Hole Creek, North Carolina

March 19–21, 1865

Battle of Bentonville – Here, the regiment was nearly surrounded while assigned to picket duty

March 24, 1865

Occupation of Goldsbore

April 10–14, 1865

Advance on Raleigh

April 14, 1865

Occupation of Raleigh

April 26, 1865

Bennett Place – Surrender of Johnston and his army

==== Post War Activities ====
April 29 – May 19, 1865

March to Washington, D.C. – via Richmond, Virginia

May 24, 1865

Grand Review

June 7, 1865

Mustered out

=== Strength and Casualties ===
When the regiment mustered in on September 1, 1862, it included 862 enlisted men. The regiment suffered 9 officers and 95 enlisted men who were killed in action or mortally wounded and 117 enlisted men who died of disease, for a total of 221 fatalities.

== Regimental Organization ==
=== Headquarters ===
The 78th Illinois Infantry Regiment was organized at Quincy, Illinois, in Adams County.

Commanding Officers

- Colonel William H. Bennison – resigned commission September 2, 1863.
- Colonel Carter Van Vleck – died of wounds August 23, 1864.
- Colonel Maris R. Vernon – mustered out with the regiment.

=== Company A ===
Recruited in Schuyler County, Illinois.

=== Company B ===
Recruited in Adams County, Illinois.

Companies B and C were captured by, then Colonel, John Hunt Morgan during a December 26, 1862, raid at Muldraugh Hill. They were sent to St. Louis, Missouri, under terms of parole and not exchanged until October 1863, effectively reducing the regiment by two companies of infantry.

=== Company C ===
Recruited in McDonough County, Illinois.

=== Company D ===
Recruited in Hancock County, Illinois.

=== Company E ===
Recruited in Adams County.

=== Company F ===
Recruited in Adams County.

=== Company G ===
Recruited in Adams County.

=== Company H ===
Recruited in Hancock County.

During the same raid that captured Companies B and C, Colonel Morgan attacked the Regimental Headquarters and Company H, on the morning of December 30, 1862, in New Haven, Kentucky. The company sustained no casualties, but it was assumed that Colonel Morgan's cavalry did, but was never substantiated.

=== Company I ===
Recruited in McDonough County.

=== Company K ===
Recruited in Adams County.

== Memorials ==
There is a memorial to the soldiers of the 78th Illinois at the Chickamauga & Chattanooga National Military Park.

== See also ==
- List of Illinois Civil War Units
- Illinois in the American Civil War
