= Mill Creek (Falmouth Foreside) =

Mill Creek Felt's Brook
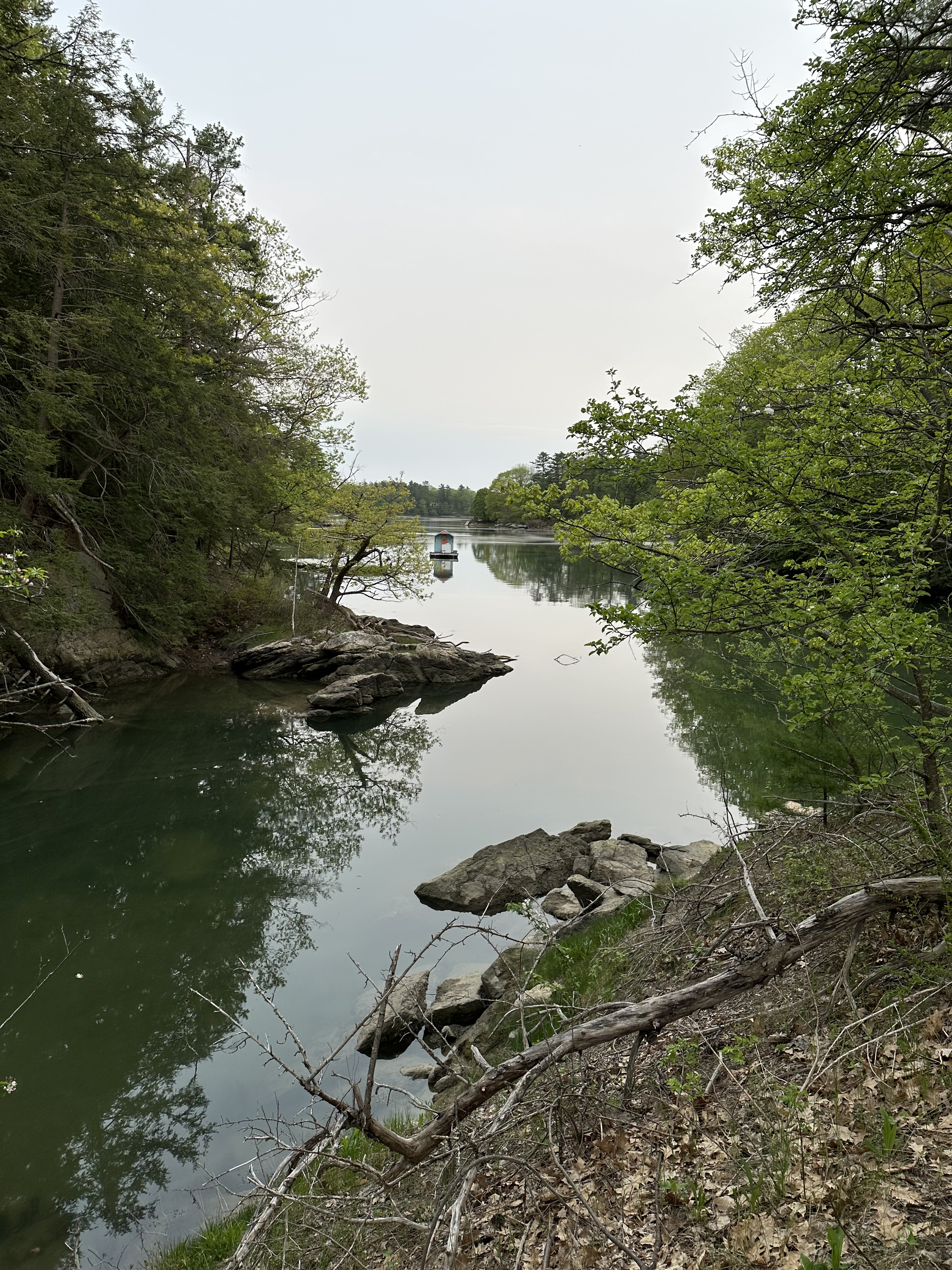
- Looking east toward the mouth of the creek from beside Route 88

Location
- Country: United States
- State: Maine
- Town: Falmouth Foreside

Physical characteristics
- Mouth: Casco Bay
  - location: Falmouth Foreside, Maine, U.S.
  - coordinates: 43.7248221°N 70.2224324°W

Mill Creek (formerly known as Felt's Brook) is a watercourse in Falmouth Foreside, Maine, United States. It is crossed, near its mouth at inner Casco Bay, by State Route 88 — known as Foreside Road (formerly Atlantic Highway) in that section. A plaster mill formerly stood directly south of this crossing, at the end of today's Old Mill Road, for 140 years.

The brook was originally named for English immigrant George Felt, who was a large landowner in the area in the 17th century.

Mill Creek Preserve is nearby.
