= Mendon Township, Illinois =

Township in Illinois, US

Mendon Township
- Township
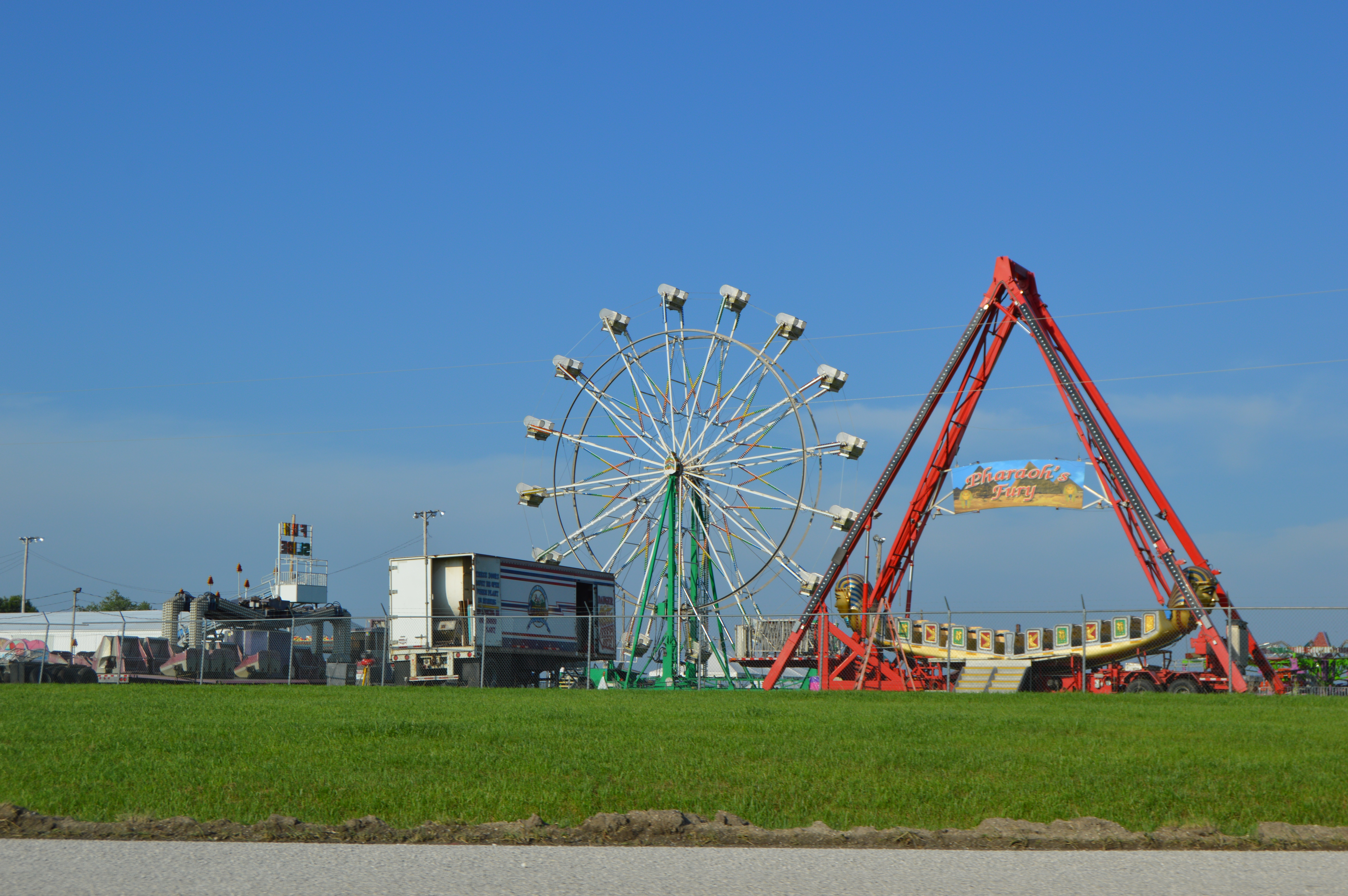
- Amusement rides at the Adams County Fairgrounds

- Location in Adams County

- Adams County's location in Illinois
- Coordinates: 40°05′19″N 91°17′41″W
- Country: United States
- State: Illinois
- County: Adams
- Established: November 6, 1849

Area
  - Total: 36.76 sq mi (95.2 km^{2})
  - Land: 36.65 sq mi (94.9 km^{2})
  - Water: 0.11 sq mi (0.28 km^{2}) 0.30%
- Elevation: 728 ft (222 m)

Population (2020)
  - Total: 1,445
  - Density: 39.43/sq mi (15.22/km^{2})
- Time zone: UTC-6 (CST)
  - Summer (DST): UTC-5 (CDT)
- ZIP codes: 62301, 62338, 62349, 62351, 62376
- FIPS code: 17-001-48320

Mendon Township is one of twenty-two townships in Adams County, Illinois, United States. As of the 2020 census, its population was 1,445 and it contained 600 housing units.

The township is named after Mendon, Massachusetts.

== Geography ==
According to the 2010 census, the township has a total area of 36.76 square miles (95.2 km^{2}), of which 36.65 square miles (94.9 km^{2}) (or 99.70%) is land and 0.11 square miles (0.28 km^{2}) (or 0.30%) is water.

=== Cities ===
- Mendon

=== Unincorporated towns ===
- Bloomfield

=== Cemeteries ===
The township contains three cemeteries: Franklin, Moyer and Saint Joseph.

=== Major highways ===
- Illinois State Route 61

=== Airports and landing strips ===
- Cramm Landing Area

== Demographics ==
As of the 2020 census there were 1,445 people, 603 households, and 453 families residing in the township. The population density was 39.26 inhabitants per square mile (15.16/km^{2}). There were 600 housing units at an average density of 16.30 units per square mile (6.29 units/km^{2}). The racial makeup of the township was 95.22% White, 0.48% African American, 0.00% Native American, 0.00% Asian, 0.00% Pacific Islander, 0.62% from other races, and 3.67% from two or more races. Hispanic or Latino of any race were 1.11% of the population.

There were 603 households, out of which 43.10% had children under the age of 18 living with them, 62.85% were married couples living together, 8.46% had a female householder with no spouse present, and 24.88% were non-families. 24.20% of all households were made up of individuals, and 17.10% had someone living alone who was 65 years of age or older. The average household size was 2.74 and the average family size was 3.25.

The township's age distribution consisted of 30.4% under the age of 18, 6.1% from 18 to 24, 22.8% from 25 to 44, 23.2% from 45 to 64, and 17.4% who were 65 years of age or older. The median age was 38.5 years. For every 100 females, there were 99.6 males. For every 100 females age 18 and over, there were 86.9 males.

The median income for a household in the township was $68,854, and the median income for a family was $86,125. Males had a median income of $41,979 versus $37,750 for females. The per capita income for the township was $29,633. About 4.9% of families and 6.4% of the population were below the poverty line, including 8.7% of those under age 18 and 7.8% of those age 65 or over.

Historical population
Census	Pop.	Note	%±
2010	1,520		—
2020	1,445		−4.9%
U.S. Decennial Census

== School districts ==
- Griggsville-Perry Community Unit School District 4

== Political districts ==
- Illinois' 17th congressional district
- State House District 93
- State Senate District 47
