= Duck Cove =

- Cove
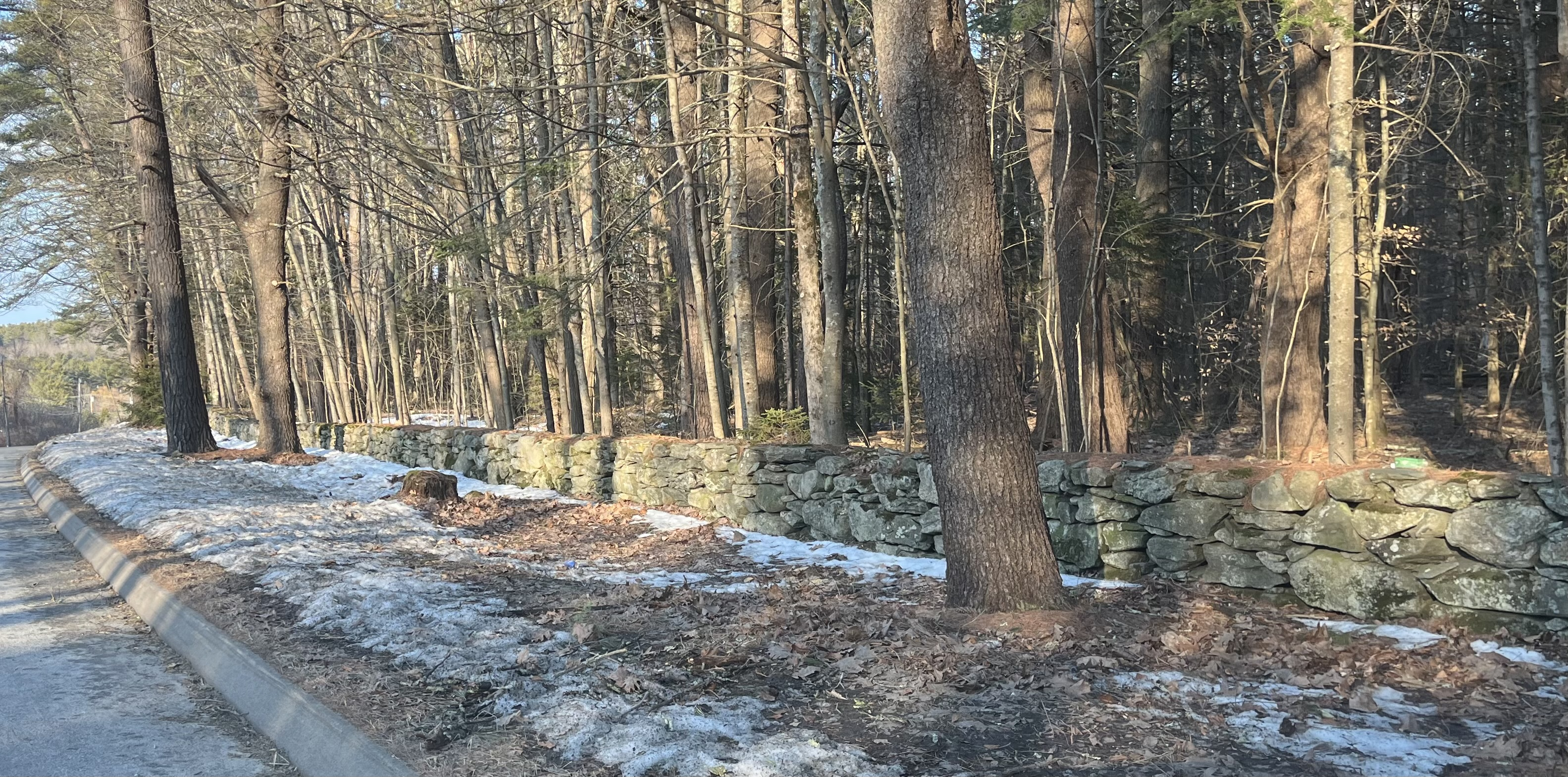
- Part of the western section of the wall surrounding Walter Gendall's Duck Farm, which overlooked the cove
- Interactive map of Duck Cove
- Coordinates: 43.7670286°N 70.1953074°W
- Country: United States
- State: Maine
- County: Cumberland
- Towns: Cumberland Foreside
- Time zone: UTC-5 (Eastern (EST))
  - Summer (DST): UTC-4 (EDT)

Duck Cove is a cove in Cumberland, Maine, United States. It is part of the larger Broad Cove, which sits between Sunset Point, at the southern end of Yarmouth, and the eastern edge of Cumberland Foreside. State Route 88 (formerly the Atlantic Highway) runs beside the cove (as Foreside Road south of the Yarmouth line and Lafayette Street beyond it).

Duck Farm, owned by Walter Gendall, a captain in both King Phillip's War and King William's War, incorporated Duck Cove. The dry-stone boundary wall on its western and northern sides is still intact. This land is now partly traversed by a connecting trail system as part of an easement arranged by Chebeague & Cumberland Land Trust with local property owners.
