= Jacob Mitchell =

Jacob Mitchell may refer to:

- Jacob Mitchell (deacon), American deacon
- Jake Mitchell (Jacob Ryan Mitchell), American Olympic swimmer
