= Westcustogo Inn =

- The building around 1930
- Interactive map of Westcustogo Inn

Restaurant information
- Established: 1923
- Closed: 2006
- Previous owners: Ernest Percy Johnson (1923–1943); James F. Riley and Edward W. Clare (1946–1960); Fred and Doris Webster (1961–1962); James F. Riley (1962–1964); Ralph and Betsey Clemons (1986–2006)
- Dress code: Smart casual
- Location: 10 Princes Point Road, Yarmouth, Maine, 04096, United States
- Coordinates: 43.7886°N 70.1728°W
- Reservations: Yes
- Website: www.angelfire.com/me4/westcustogoinn/view.htm

Westcustogo Inn was an inn and restaurant in Yarmouth, Maine, United States. Located at 10 Princes Point Road, it was in business, albeit not continuously, for 83 years.

== History ==
The inn was established by Ernest Percy Johnson in 1923, although the Grand Lodge of Iowa's bulletin of 1918 mentions a meeting was held at the Westcustogo Inn, albeit listed as being in Portland, on September 9 that year. Its last owners were Ralph and Betsey Clemons in 2006. The property consisted of a fine-dining restaurant, a bar and a lounge. It had several uses between the mid-1960s and the early 1970s, before reopening for public dining in 1973. It was damaged by a fire in 1961.

Trolley cars of the Portland and Yarmouth Electric Railway Company used to run, every fifteen minutes, from Portland to Yarmouth between 1898 and 1933. There was a stop immediately opposite the inn, at the southern end of Pleasant Street.

== Notable guests ==
Former First Lady Eleanor Roosevelt and her entourage once stayed at the Royal River Cabins, further north along Route 88, because the Eastland Park Hotel in Portland banished her dog, Fala. She chose to dine at the Westcustogo, while the owner's daughter entertained Fala on the porch.

Other notable guests at the inn include Fred Allen, Portland Hoffa, Joe Louis, Gene Tunney, Clark Gable, Charlie Chaplin, Greta Garbo, Margaret Chase Smith (on November 4, 1965), Jean Harlow, Mary Pickford, Myrna Loy, Douglas Fairbanks, Bette Davis and Gary Merrill; however, the authenticity of the signatures in Ernest Johnson's 1923–1941 guestbook have been found difficult to verify.

== Closure ==
After the inn closed, it was vacant for a while, before being renovated by Cunningham Security, who are still the occupants.

== See also ==
- Historical buildings and structures of Yarmouth, Maine
