= Walter Gendall =

- Born: Cornwall, England
- Died: September 19, 1688; North Yarmouth, Massachusetts Bay Colony
- Occupation: Mill owner
- Known for: Captain in King Philip's War and King William's War

Walter Gendall (died September 19, 1688) was a 17th-century English sawmill owner in and prominent citizen of North Yarmouth, Massachusetts Bay Colony (now Yarmouth, Maine). He was also a captain in King Philip's War of 1675–1678 and King William's War of 1688–1697. He lost his life in the second conflict. His name is also spelled Walter Gendle in literature.

== Early life ==
Gendall, a native of Cornwall, England, arrived on American shores from England around 1640. There was a record held at the Trelawney Plantation on Richmond Island, off Cape Elizabeth, Massachusetts Bay Colony (now in Maine), that he was resident in the area. From that point, however, nothing is known of Gendall for around two decades.

== Career ==
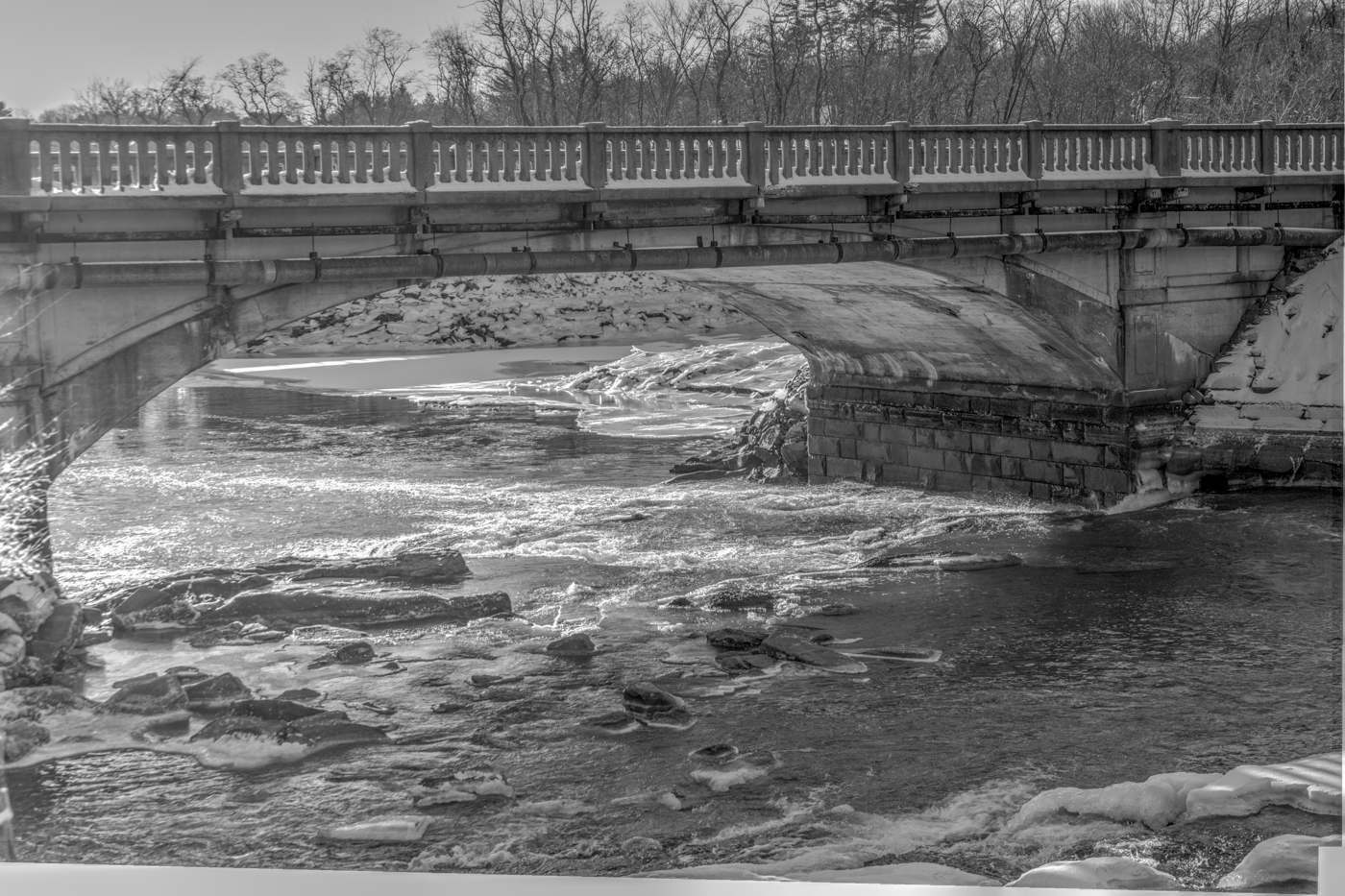
Gendall's mills formerly stood beside today's East Main Street bridge carrying the traffic of Maine State Route 88

During King Philip's War, while at Fort Lyall in Falmouth in August 1676, Captain Gendall decided that the "furious natives" were of sufficient anger that he sent word to Boston for reinforcements. He was granted a detachment of 130 soldiers. A short while later, he was held captive, for ransom, by the natives, with whom he had been on good terms for years. He had visited their settlements and traded with their chiefs for animal skins. "He was much esteemed by all the tribes," wrote Charles Banks.

In October 1676, Gendall escaped a capture of his Blackpoint garrison on Mount Desert Island. He reached Portsmouth, Province of New Hampshire, where he took possession of a thirty-ton ketch. He and a crew of seven sailed to Scarborough, Massachusetts (now in Maine), with the aim of recovering what possessions of his remained. Upon dropping anchor at Richmond Island in Saco Bay, a group of Abenaki Indians, led by Chief Mog of Cape Porpoise, captured the vessel and its crew. Under Mog's orders, the ketch and its crew (minus Gendall) was sailed up the Sheepscot River and berthed for the winter. One crew member died from injuries sustained during the capture; the others were divided amongst the Indians and taken, by canoe, to Penobscot Bay via Damariscotta. Gendall, meanwhile, was retained as a hostage. He was taken from Scarborough to Wells and, while being used as a human shield, to New Hampshire. Mog visited Major Richard Waldron, the English militia commander in Dover. Mog "announced himself as empowered to negotiate peace with the English on behalf of Madockawando and Cheberrina, allied 'Sachems' of Penobscot and Kennebec" and released Gendall after the Englishman arranged for Mog to be given a safe-passage permit to Boston. Around two weeks later, Mog negotiated terms of a treaty between the Colony and a coalition of Abenaki and Etchemin chiefs.

In September 1677, a court in Boston found Gendall guilty of treason for his relationship with the Native Americans. In the ensuing three days, Gendall escaped and returned, it is believed, to Scarborough. A bond was paid by Gendall's friend Nathaniel Fryer as part of an agreement with the court, and the incident came to a conclusion.

Peace was reached with the Indians on August 12, 1678, when three English commissioners met chief Squanto and two other sagamores to sign a treaty.

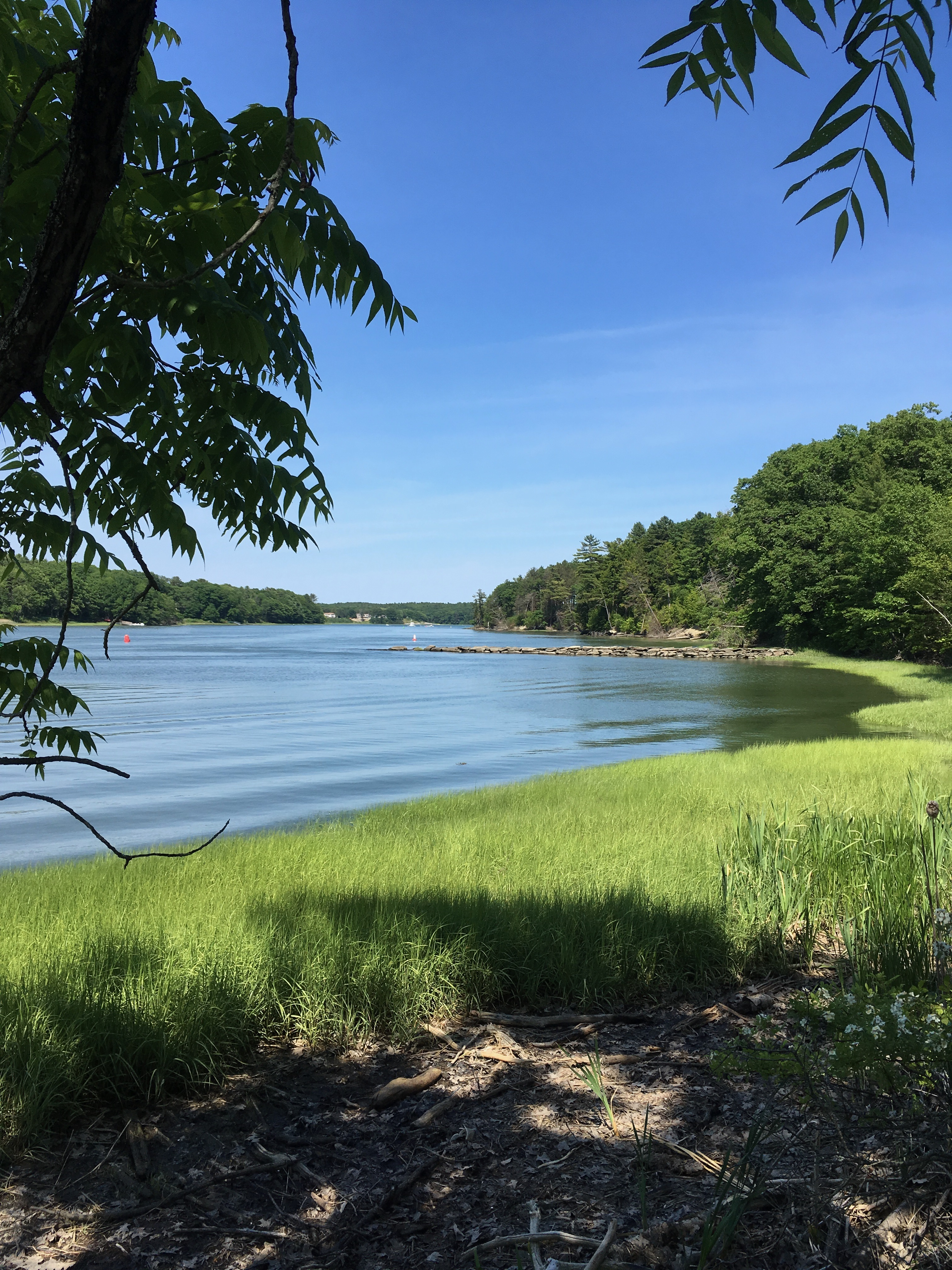
Larrabee's Landing, near the mouth of the Royal River. Callen Point, where Gendall was killed, is on the right

On July 12, 1681, Gendall founded Casco Mill at the eastern side of the First Falls in Yarmouth, on land formerly occupied by Henry Sayward's mill. Gendall's dwelling was beside the mill. He built a boarding home "of rude construction" for his mill workers on the opposite shore. Three years later, he claimed all of the 2,000 acres (810 ha) owned by fellow Englishman, early settler George Felt. He had purchased 100 acres (40 ha) from Felt a few years prior.

Gendall was selected to a committee in charge of laying out the town of North Yarmouth, which was incorporated on September 22, 1680. Also on the committee were Bartholomew Gedney, Joshua Scotton and Silvanus Davis. The town was designed on a location then known as Maine's Point. The committee was superseded by the appointment of Gendall and three others as trustees of the town.

== Personal life ==
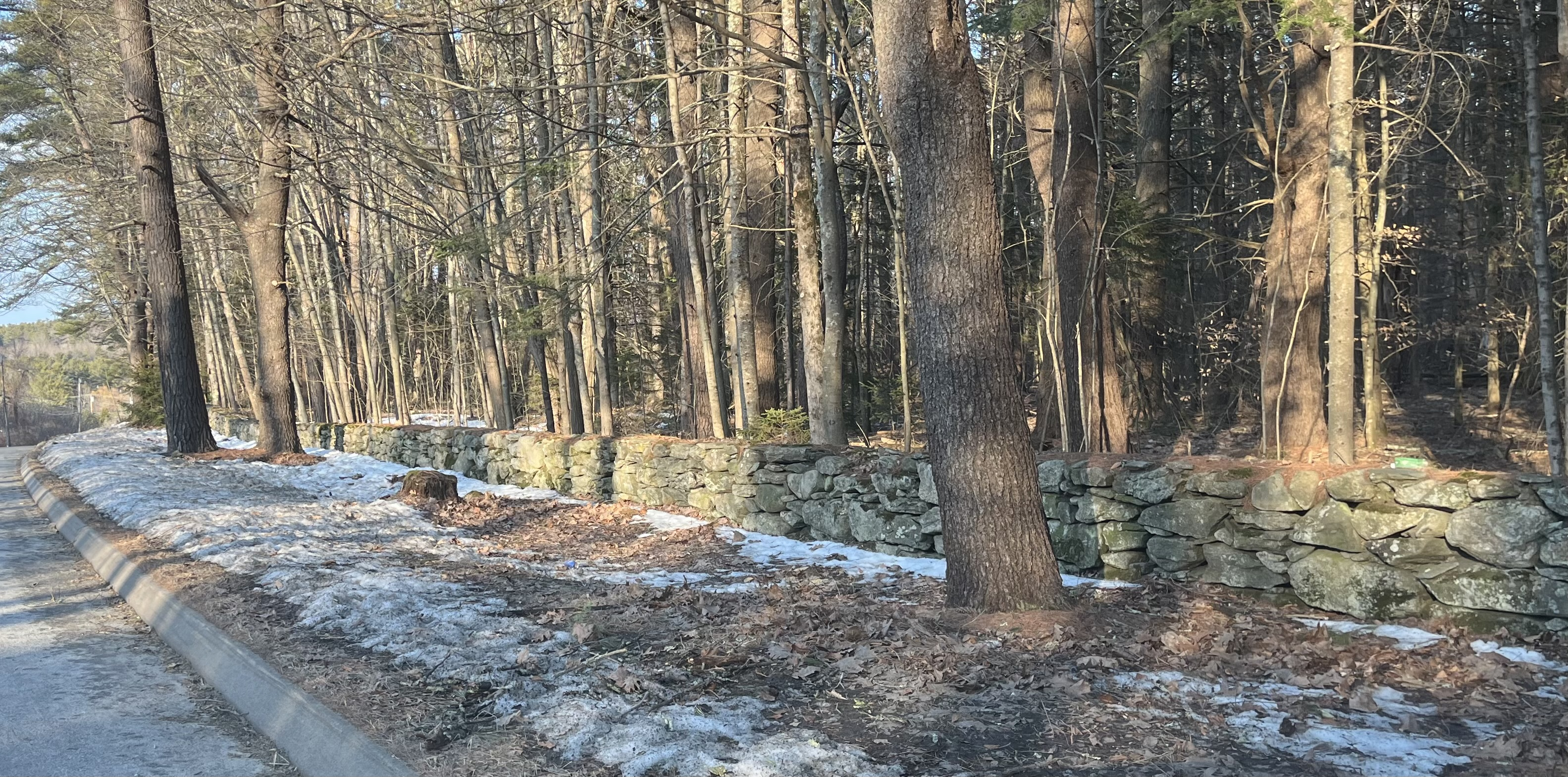
A section of the wall surrounding Gendall's former farm at Duck Cove

It is believed Gendall was married to Joane Guy, with whom he had a family. He had lived with them during his time as a military officer in Scarborough (from around 1661) and Falmouth, Massachusetts (now Portland, Maine). His father-in-law was John Guy, a fisherman in Falmouth.

His farm incorporated Duck Cove, at the western end of Broad Cove, beyond Town Landing Road in today's Cumberland Foreside. The dry-stone boundary wall is still intact. This land is now partly traversed by a connecting trail system as part of an easement arranged by Chebeague & Cumberland Land Trust with local property owners.

In 1687, Gendall was granted land on Clapboard Island, off of today's Falmouth Foreside.

== Death ==
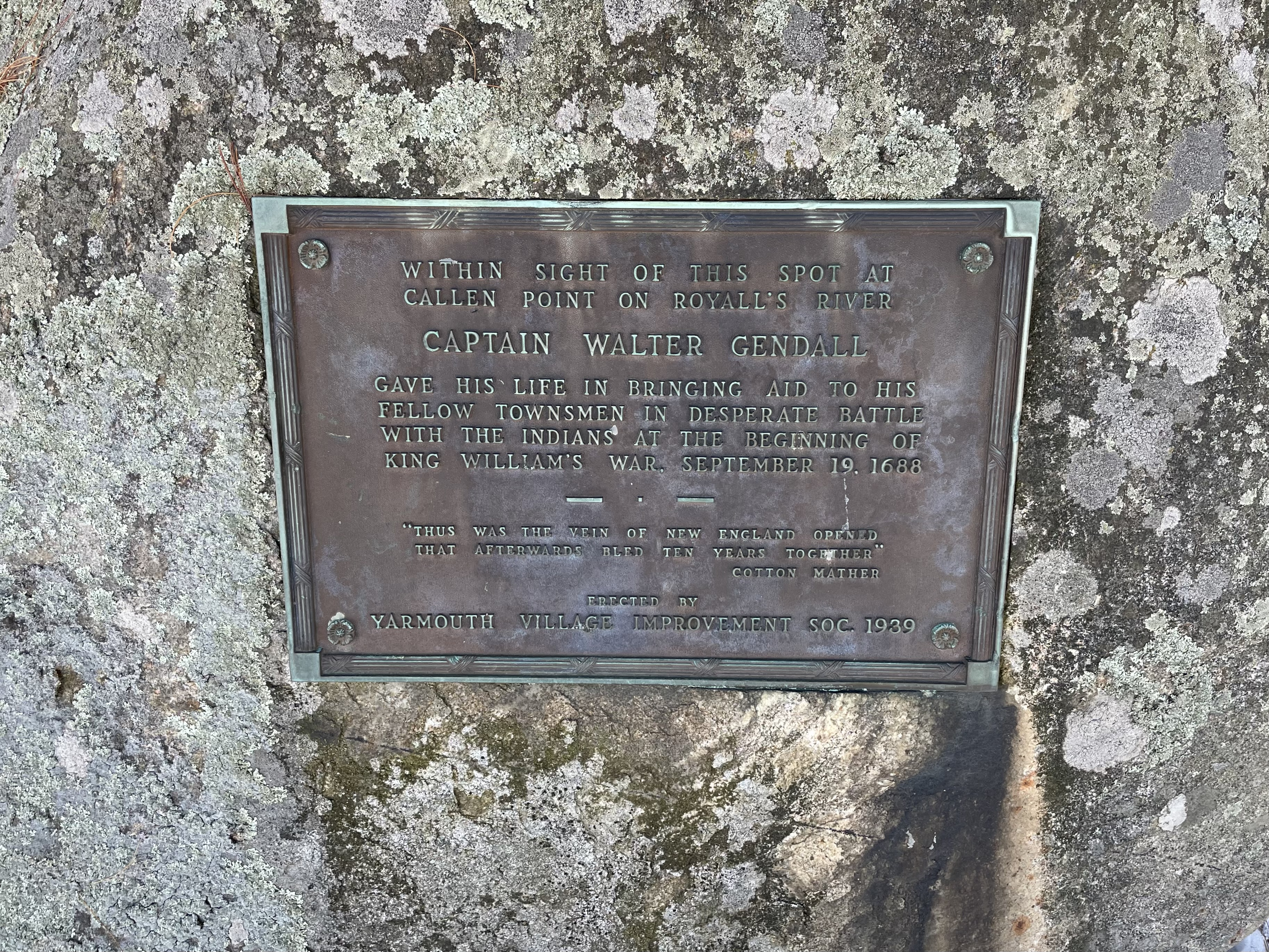
Gendall's memorial plaque in Yarmouth, Maine

Gendall, "one of the bravest and foremost men of the early days", died on September 19, 1688, shortly after the outbreak of Second Indian War, having been shot by Indians near Callen Point while taking supplies to his troops building a fort on the southern side of the Royal River. He had mistaken the cessation of the Indians' gunfire to mean that they were out of ammunition, and he set out to cross the river. He made the journey without incident, but was shot upon reaching the opposite shoreline. His last words were: "I have lost my life in your service." The Indians burned three houses and two barns of Gendall's.

Gendall's estate was not probated until 1700, twelve years after his death.

A stone marker honoring Gendall stands to the north of 28 Lafayette Street in the area of Yarmouth that came to be known as Grantville. It was installed by Yarmouth’s Village Improvement Society in 1939.
