= Mitchell garrison =

House in Maine, United States

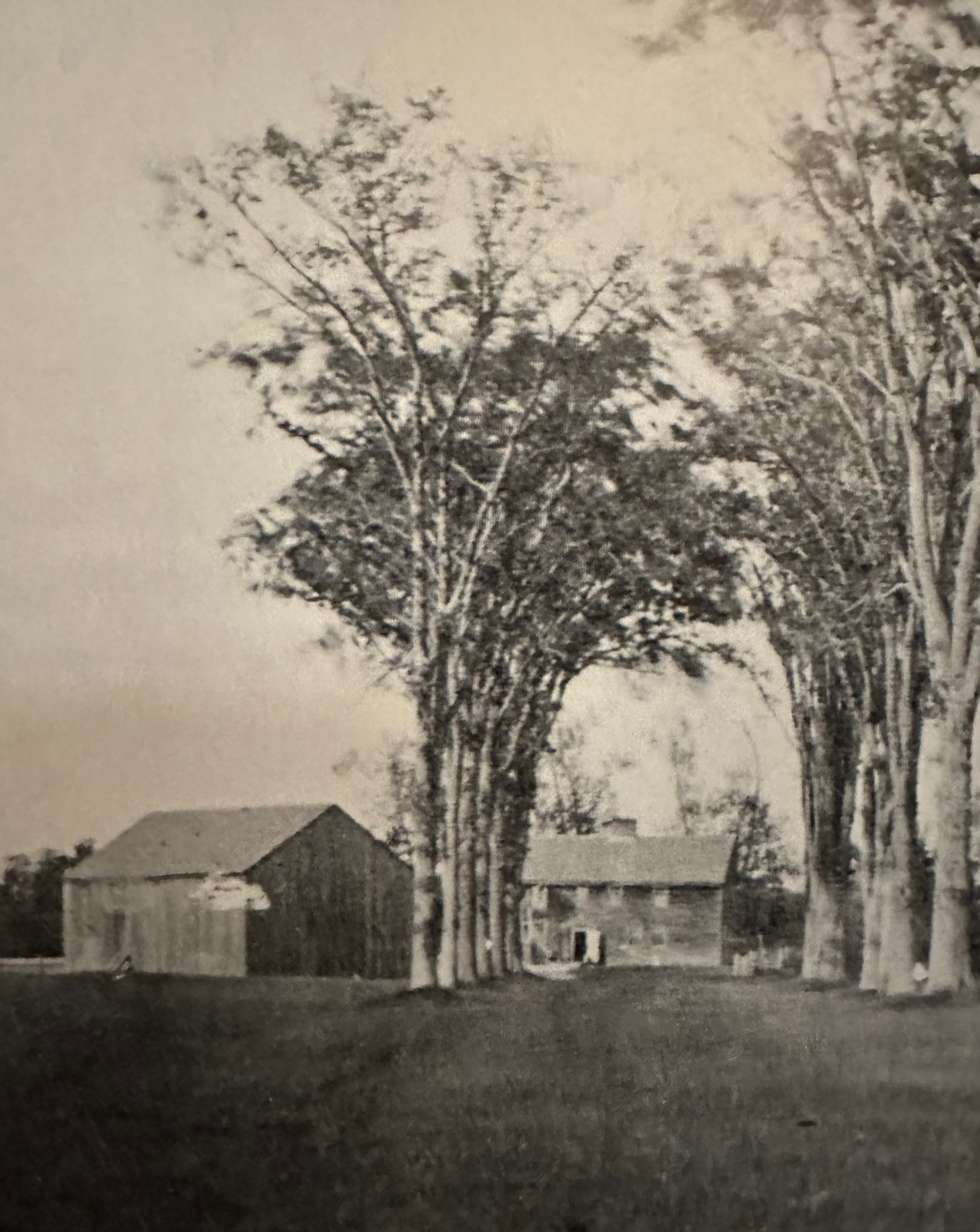
- The home in the second half of the 19th century
- Interactive map of the Mitchell garrison area

General information
- Architectural style: Garrison
- Location: North Yarmouth, Province of Massachusetts Bay, Smith Street
- Coordinates: 43.7911°N 70.1674°W
- Completed: 1728 (298 years ago)

Technical details
- Floor count: 2

The Mitchell garrison was an important building in what was, at the time, North Yarmouth, Province of Massachusetts Bay.

Built in 1728, on the town's lot number 91, it stood at the rear of today's Holy Cross Cemetery on a bluff around 50 feet (15 m) immediately above the Royal River. It was used as a blockhouse, within a stockade, during the Indian wars. A tunnel was built from the home's cellar to the river. The dirt path that looks like it leads to the water is actually the town's original stage road, formerly lined with elm trees. As North Yarmouth's stagecoach travel increased in popularity, the stockade was removed and the home was enlarged to accommodate overnight guests. The original structure was made of clapboard; the extension, added on the northern side, was clad with shingles.

The home's first owner was Jacob Mitchell (c. 1672–1744), a dean and a founder of the nearby Meetinghouse under the Ledge, which stood between 1729 and 1836. His son, Jacob III, also became a deacon there. Mitchell's family lived in the house between around 1729 and 1799, when one of Mitchell's sons, David, owned it.

The building later became the home of the Whitcombs, whose name is preserved on a street off Princes Point Road. It was demolished about 1900, and the farm land was purchased in 1916 to be replaced by the cemetery. Riverside Cemetery and Holy Cross Cemetery occupy what was the northern end of today's Smith Street.

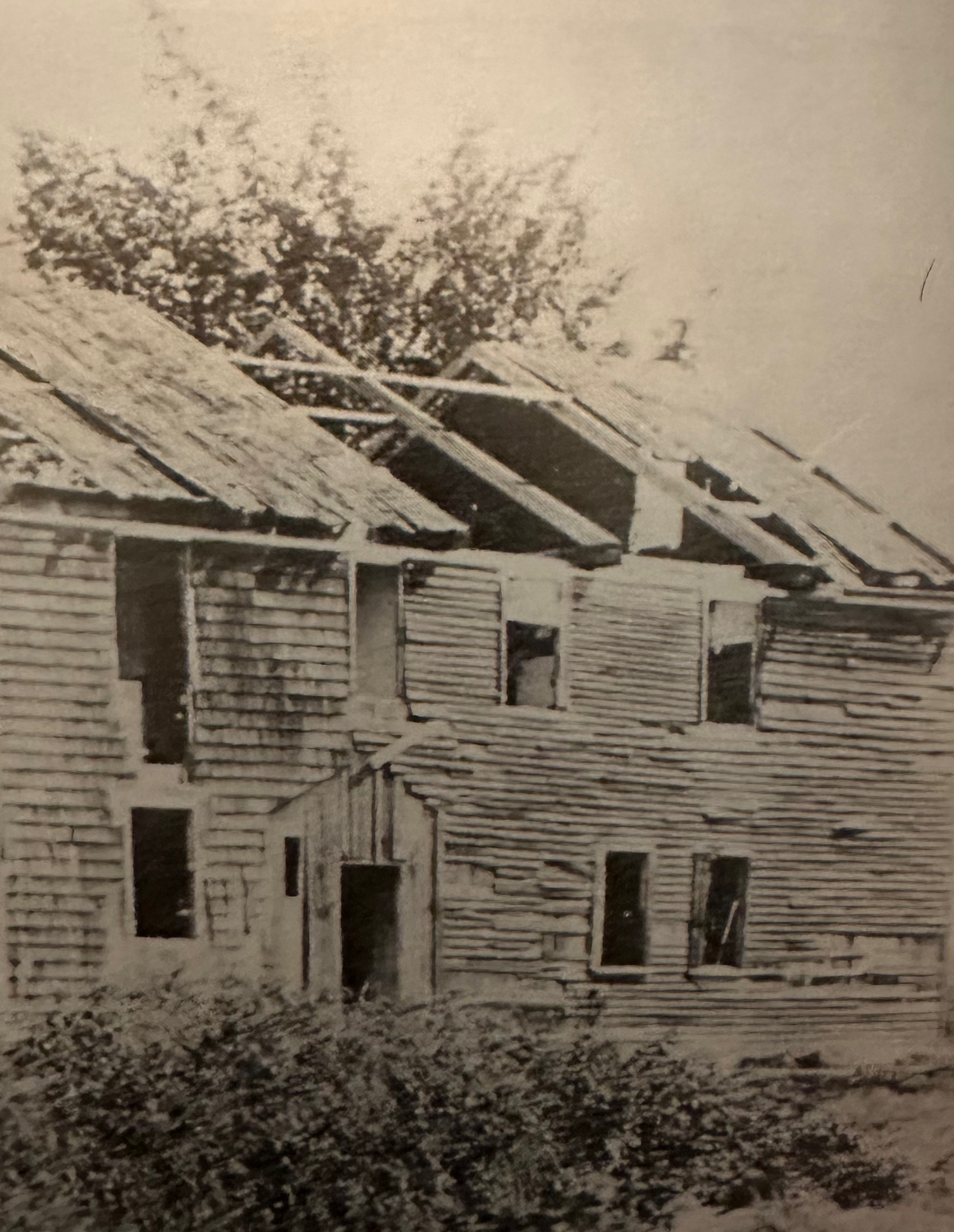
The building shortly before its destruction in the early 20th century

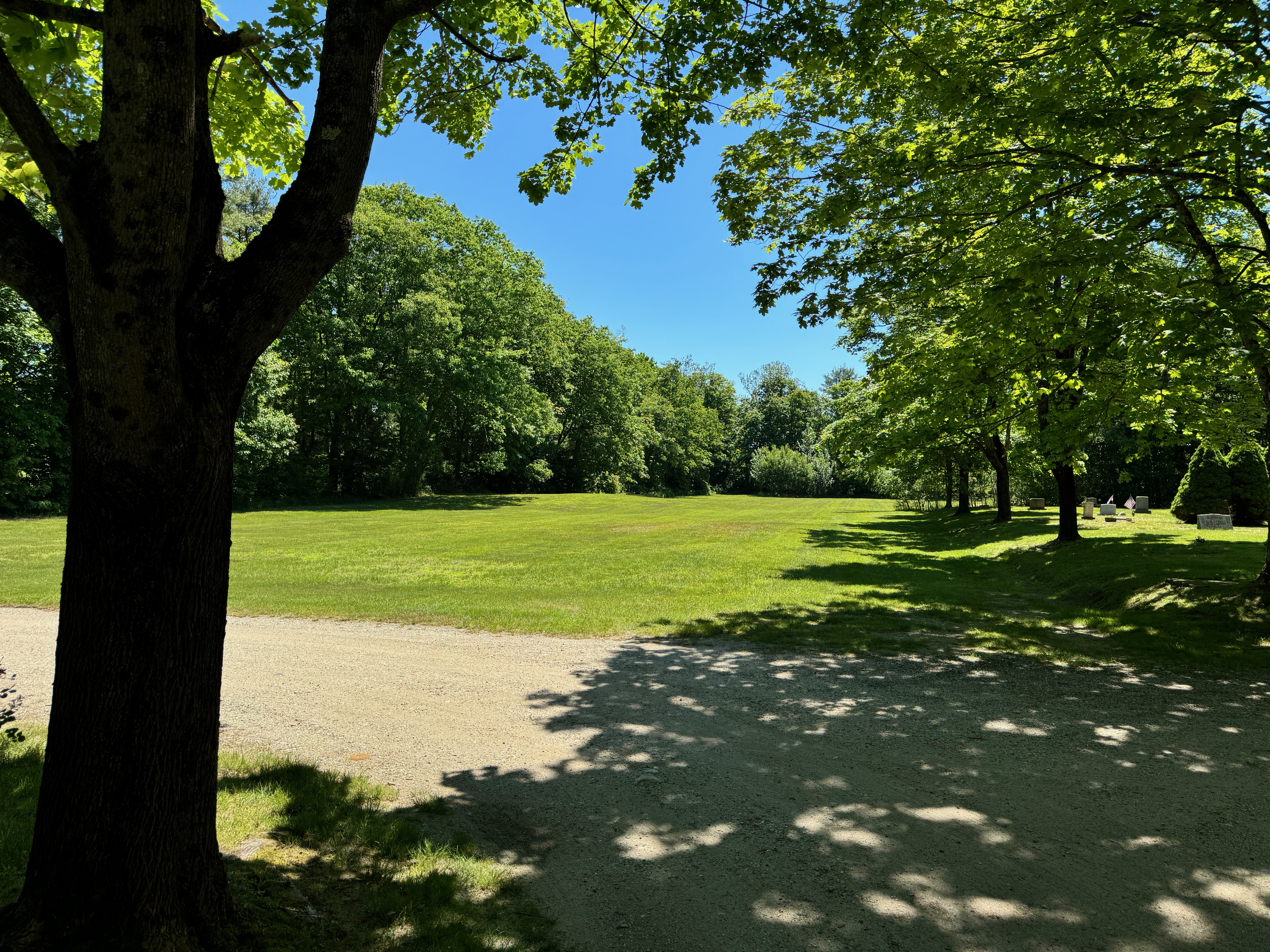
The land on which the home stood, viewed in 2024

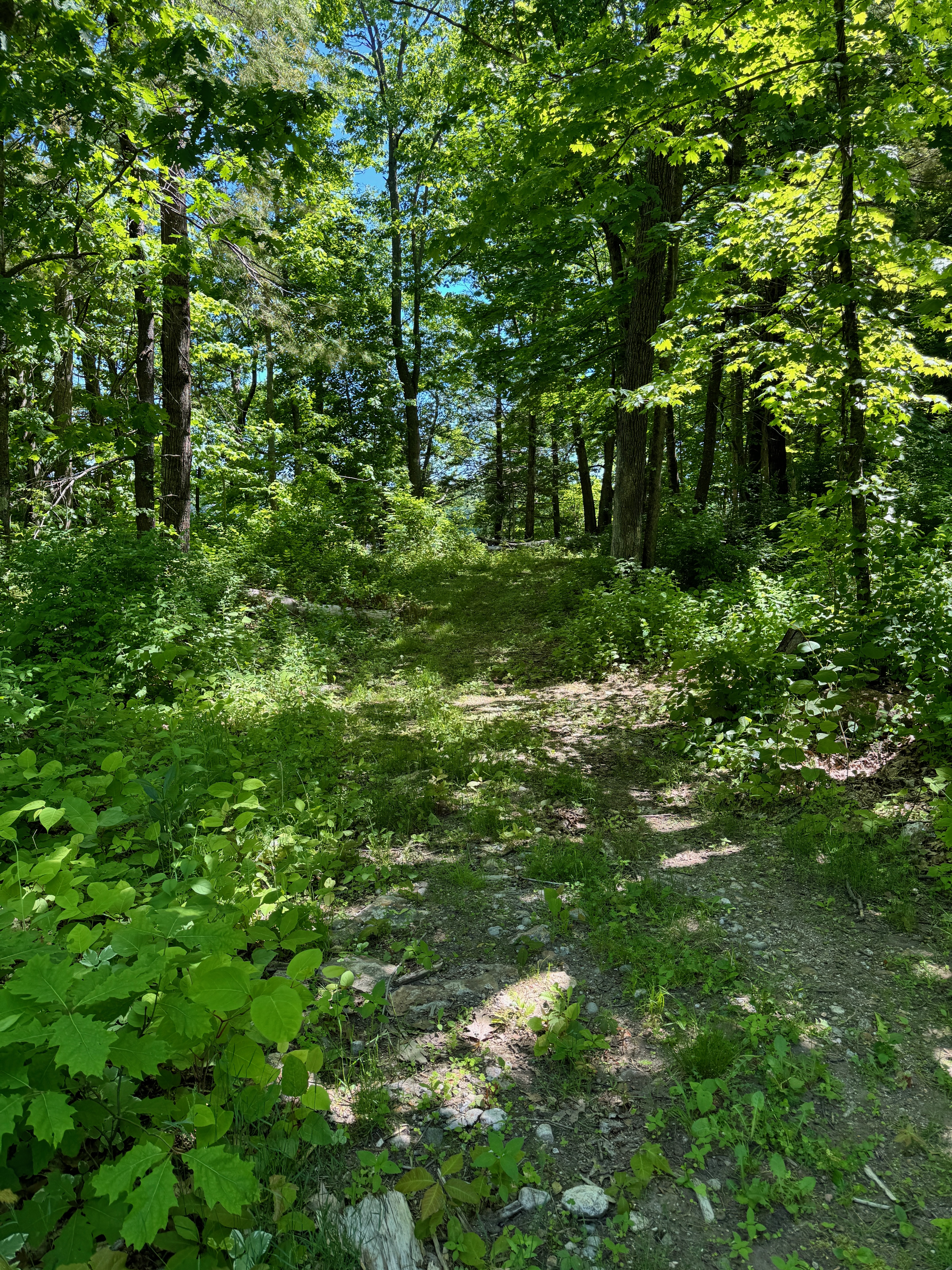
The old stage road leading down to the Royal River

== See also ==
- Historical buildings and structures of Yarmouth, Maine
