= Jacob Mitchell (deacon) =

American minister

- Born: c. 1672; Bridgewater, Massachusetts Bay Colony
- Died: December 21, 1744 (aged 71–72); North Yarmouth, Massachusetts (now Yarmouth, Maine)
- Resting place: Pioneer Cemetery, Yarmouth, Maine
- Occupation: Deacon

Jacob Curry Mitchell (c. 1672 – December 21, 1744) was an American deacon who became prominent in what is now Yarmouth, Maine.

== Early life ==
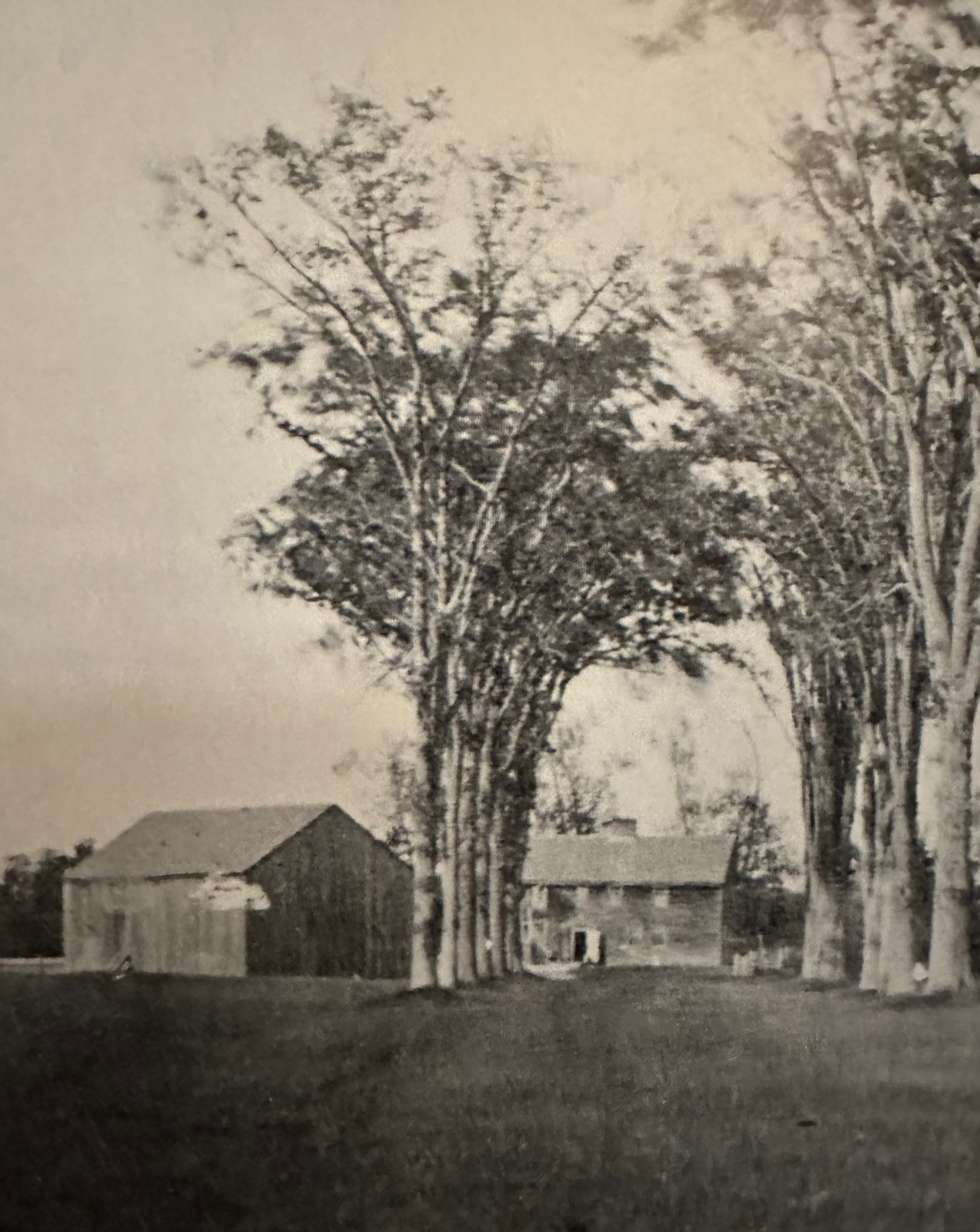
Mitchell's former garrison

Mitchell was born in Bridgewater, Massachusetts Bay Colony, to Jacob Mitchell I and Susannah Pope, both of whom died in 1675, when Jacob was around three years old, during the early stages of King Philip's War. He and his two siblings―Thomas and Mary―were raised by their uncle, Edward.

He married twice, to Deliverance Kingman (daughter of John Kingman and Elizabeth Edson), firstly, then in 1701 (after moving to Kingston, Rhode Island) to Rebecca Cushman, with whom he had at least four children: Jacob III (born 1696), Rebekah (1704), Seth (1705) and Isaac (1715), the latter named for his father-in-law.

In 1727, the couple moved north to North Yarmouth, Province of Massachusetts Bay, where Mitchell became a founder of the Meetinghouse under the Ledge, which stood between 1729 and 1836. The younger Mitchell also became a deacon there. The same year, Mitchell and four other local men—Samuel Seabury, James Parker, Gershom Rice and Phineas Jones—were tasked with the management of the new town of North Yarmouth, Maine. Their affairs included laying out the highways.

The Mitchell garrison home, built a year before the meetinghouse, was located at the rear of today's Holy Cross Cemetery in Yarmouth. A stockade used during the Indian wars, a tunnel was built from the home's cellar to the nearby Royal River. The dirt path that looks like it leads to the water is actually the original stage road. Mitchell's family lived in the house between around 1729 and 1799, when one of Mitchell's sons, David, owned it. It then became the home of the Whitcombs, whose name is preserved on a street off Princes Point Road. It was demolished about 1900, and the farm land was purchased in 1916 to be replaced by the cemetery.

== Death ==
Mitchell died on December 21, 1744, aged 71 or 72. He was interred in the Pioneer Cemetery in today's Yarmouth, Maine. His father is buried in Yarmouth's Old Baptist Cemetery, while other members of the family (including his son) are buried in the Ledge Cemetery, adjacent to the Pioneer Cemetery.
