= Sturdivant Island =

Private island in Maine, United States

Coordinates: 43°44′29″N 70°10′53″W

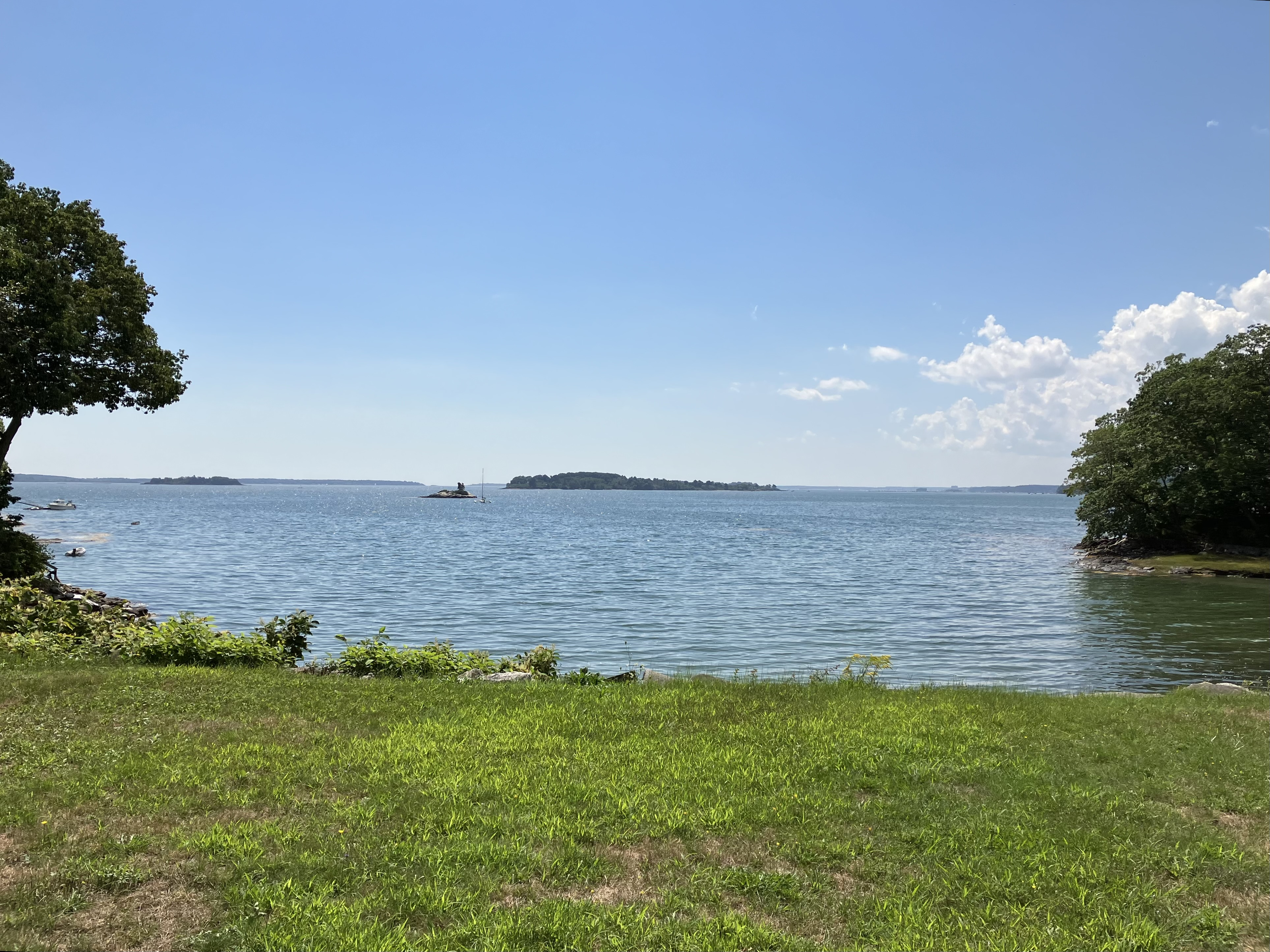
Sturdivant Island center, as seen from House Island

Sturdivant Island is a small private island in Casco Bay which is part of in Cumberland, Maine, United States. The island is accessible only by boat and is "51 feet high and covered with grass and bushes." Public access is prohibited. Sturdivant Island includes several summer residences. The island was owned by Captain Ephraim Sturdivant, a privateer, who "[i]n 1810...imported Merino sheep from Portugal, and pastured them on Sturdivant’s Island in Casco Bay, which he owned." In 1883 Arthur Hannaford resided on "Sturdivant Island where he began selling produce in Portland, the beginnings of today’s Hannaford Brothers grocery chain." By 1912 Sturdivant Island was home to at least one fishing camp.
