= Sunset Point (Yarmouth, Maine) =

- Promontory
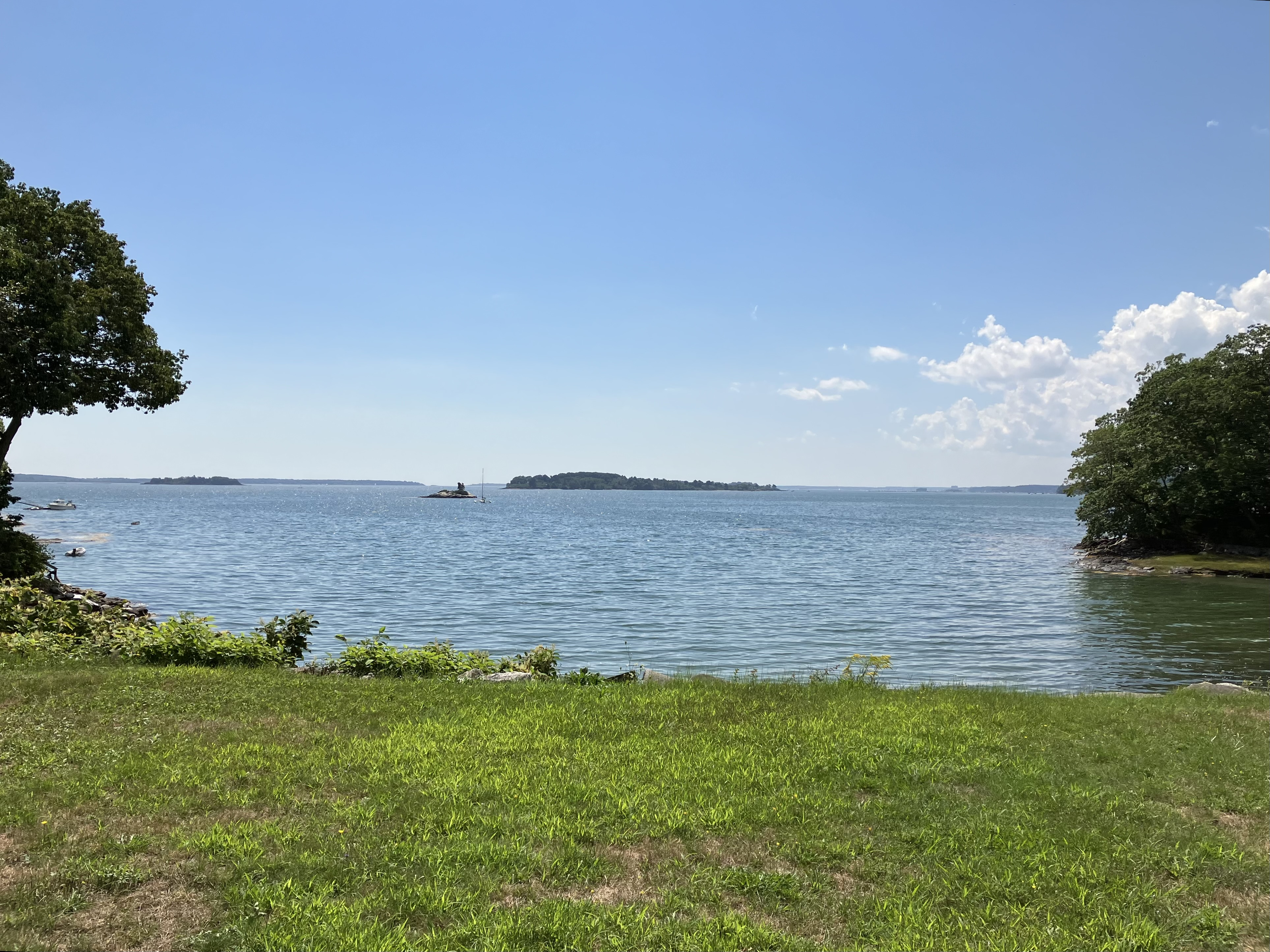
- Looking due south to The Nubbin (left of center) and Sturdivant Island from the Sunset Point cove
- Interactive map of Sunset Point
- Coordinates: 43.76221337077°N 70.178504632°W
- Country: United States
- State: Maine
- County: Cumberland
- Town: Yarmouth
- Time zone: UTC-5 (Eastern (EST))
  - Summer (DST): UTC-4 (EDT)

Sunset Point is a promontory in Yarmouth, Maine, United States. It is located 2.65 miles (4.26 km) south of Yarmouth Village and looks out into inner Casco Bay, marking the eastern side of Broad Cove. Sunset Road leads to the point itself. It begins at an intersection with Princes Point Road, Battery Point Lane and Nubbin Reach.

In the early 1880s, the adjacent (to the east) Princes Point began to develop as a summer colony. For several years it had become a favorite camping spot for the villagers and the inhabitants of the inland parts of the town who came here for clam bakes and picnics. The town road ended at the John Allen Drinkwater barn, and here a large gate opened into the pasture which included the two points.

The first property on Sunset Point was purchased in the 1800s by a man named John Burr Carruthers. The family has in their possession a lithograph of John Burr Carruthers and several other campers when the property was first purchased, and before it was developed. The first building on Sunset Point was a cottage built by John Burr Carruthers in 1888, and it still resides on the property.
