= Reaper (schooner) =

Massachusetts privateer schooner

- The letter of marque giving Capt. Sturdivant permission to take offensive action against British shipping

History

United States
- Name: Reaper

General characteristics
- Type: Schooner
- Tons burthen: 206 (bm)
- Propulsion: Sail
- Complement: 75
- Armament: 6 carriage guns

Reaper was a Massachusetts privateer schooner that Captain Ephraim Sturdivant commanded during the War of 1812. Captain Sturdivant was officially charged by President James Madison to use the ship to attack British shipping. There is no evidence that she captured any British vessels.
