= Ephraim Sturdivant House =

Historic house in Cumberland, Maine

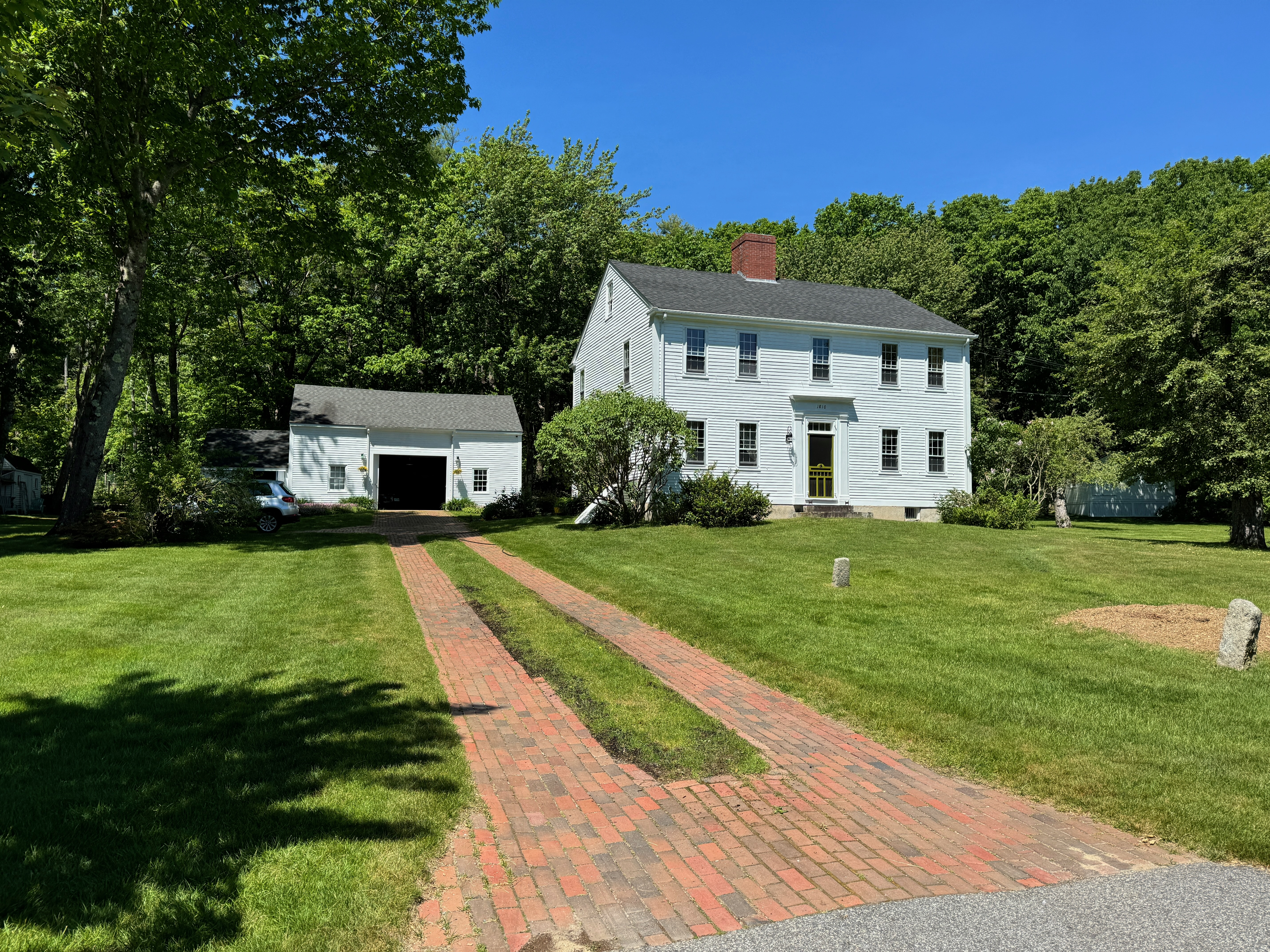
- The home, viewed in 2024
- Interactive map of the Ephraim Sturdivant House area
- Alternative names: Janet Low Parker House

General information
- Location: Cumberland Foreside, Maine, U.S., 114 Foreside Road
- Coordinates: 43.755388°N 70.204849°W
- Completed: 1810 (216 years ago)

Technical details
- Floor count: 2.5

The Ephraim Sturdivant House (also known as the Janet Low Parker House) is a home in Cumberland Foreside, Maine, United States. Located at 114 Foreside Road, it was built in 1810 as the home of Captain Ephraim Sturdivant, who is credited with naming the town of Cumberland.

The home was completed a year after the first of his three marriages. He fathered twenty-one children.

Behind the home, on a small hill known as Ephraim's Mount, there once stood twelve pine trees. Known as "the Apostles", they were used for navigational purposes by ship captains arriving into Portland harbor. The last of the trees fell in 1935.

The historic section of Foreside Road on which is stands, known as the Sturdivant neighborhood, includes the Gyger House at 70 Foreside Road (dating to the 18th century), 77 Foreside Road (1873), 74 Foreside Road (1850) and 106 Foreside Road (1812).
