= Ilsley (ship) =

History

United States
- Name: Ilsley

General characteristics
- Type: Schooner
- Tons burthen: 143 67/95 bm
- Propulsion: Sail
- Complement: 75
- Armament: 6 carriage guns

Ilsley (or Isley, or Ilsley and Razor) was a privateer schooner commanded by Captain Ephraim Sturdivant during the War of 1812. She was commissioned as a privateer on 20 April 1813. Although there may have been two vessels of the same name, Isley captured four brigs, two schooners, and a sloop before HMS Jason captured her at sea.
