= Ephraim Sturdivant =

American veteran of the War of 1812

Captain Ephraim Sturdivant (February 14, 1782 – August 31, 1868) was an American veteran of the War of 1812, namer of Cumberland, Maine, first person to bring merino sheep to Maine, a ship captain, and the first treasurer of Cumberland. In 1850 he served in the Maine Senate.

== Early life ==
Sturdivant was born on February 14, 1782, in North Yarmouth, Massachusetts (now in the state of Maine). He was the third son of David A. Sturdivant and Jane Greely. Both parents were descended from a Mayflower passenger; David being descended from Richard Warren, and Jane descended from Stephen Hopkins.

By the age of 12, Ephraim spent most of his life at sea. This life continued for another 28 years, during which time he traded in the West Indies, Europe, and more. In 1810, he imported a cargo of merino sheep from Portugal to what was later named Sturdivant Island. He became the first person to bring merino sheep to the state of Maine.

On June 18, 1812, Ephraim received permission from President James Madison to command a schooner, the Reaper, as a privateer for the War of 1812. It is also known that he commanded the Ilsley during the same war.

== Marriage and family ==
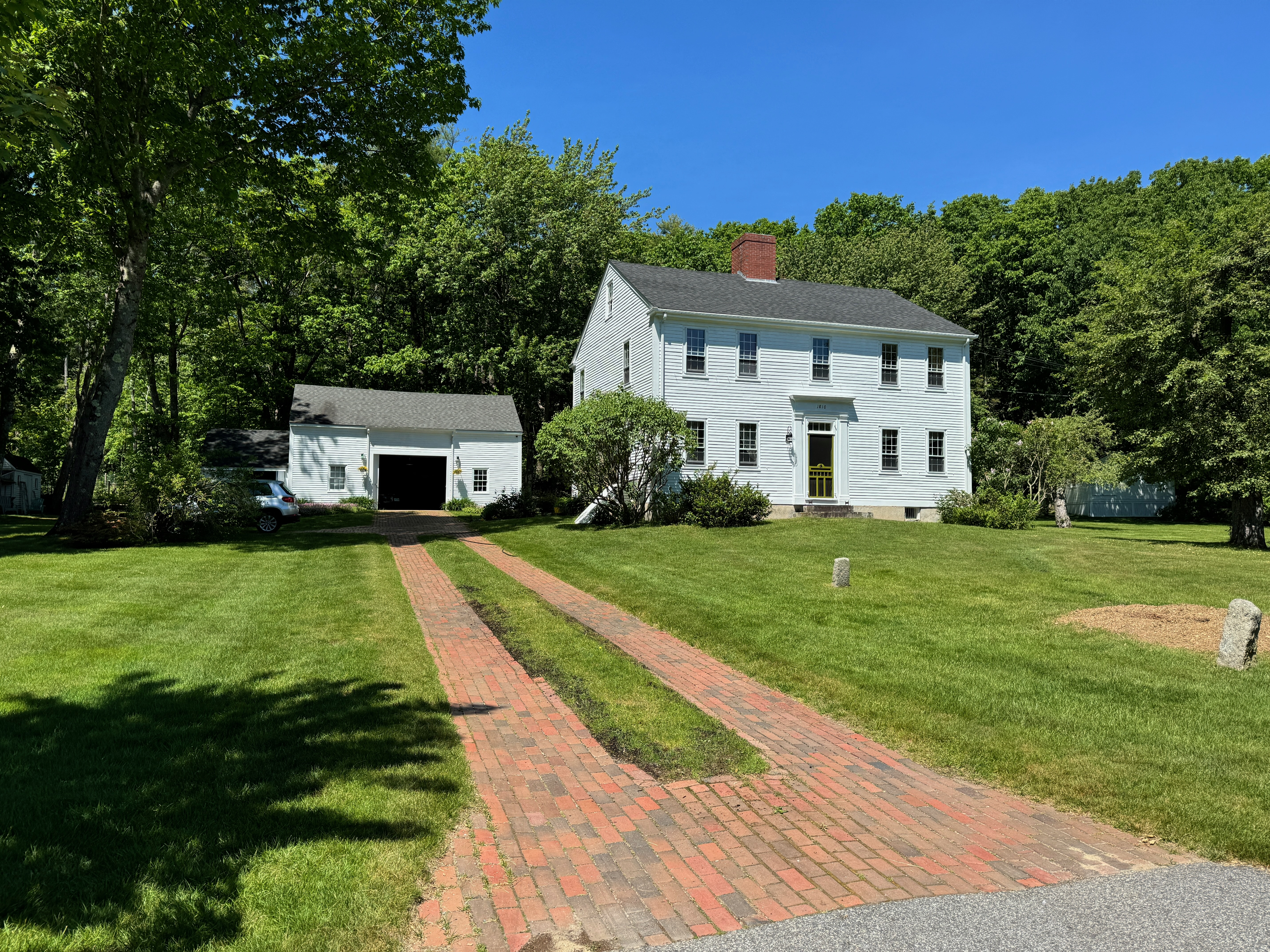
Sturdivant's former home, pictured in 2024

Ephraim's first marriage occurred on January 12, 1809, to Rachael Drinkwater. This union produced nine children:

- Alvin Sturdivant
- Henry Sturdivant

His second marriage was to Dolly S. Taylor.

His third and final marriage was to Mary Thaxter Greely.

== Later life ==
Capt. Sturdivant served as the first treasurer of Cumberland from 1820 to 1832. He was also a selectman from 1833 to 1834. He died in 1868, aged 86, from natural causes.

== Legacy ==
Cumberland still exists to this day under the same name. Ephraim Sturdivant's home on "Ephraim's Mount" had twelve tall pine trees called "The Twelve Apostles". These trees served as the second landmark for ships sailing into the Portland Harbor, although the last one fell in 1935.

== External resources ==
- History of Cumberland
- Cemetery listing
- Cumberland information - from the Cumberland Historical Society
