= Town Landing Market =

Historic building in Falmouth Foreside, Maine

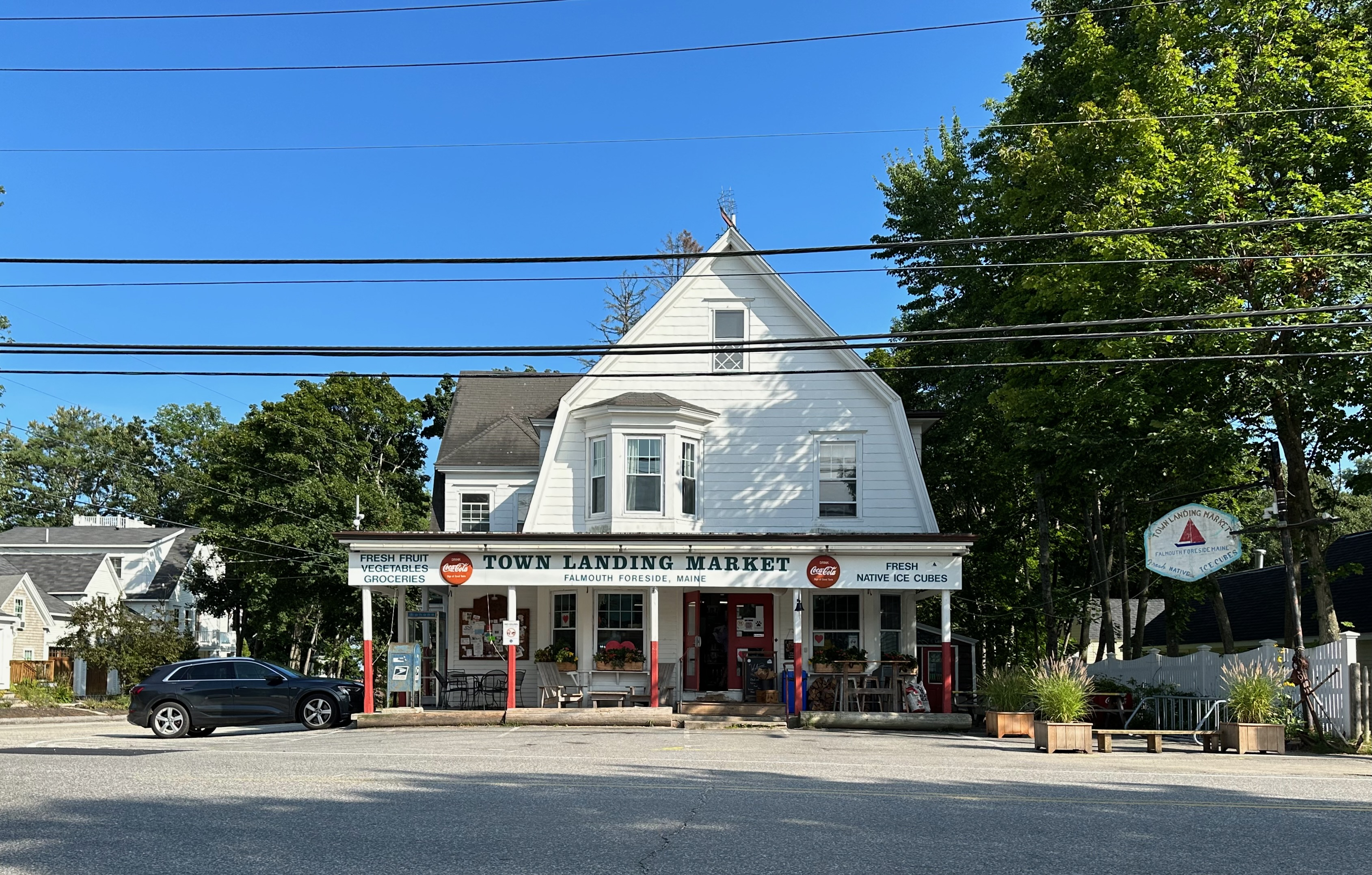
- The building in 2023
- Interactive map of the Town Landing Market area
- Former names: H. J. Poland; Calden's

General information
- Location: 269 Foreside Road, Falmouth Foreside, Maine, United States
- Coordinates: 43.734558°N 70.207965°W
- Completed: 1880 (146 years ago)

Website
- https://www.townlandingmarket.com/

Town Landing Market is a historic building in Falmouth Foreside, Maine. It has been in business, under various names, since 1880. Its original purpose was to cater to the needs of the residents of the summer cottages dotted along Foreside Road, on which it stands at its intersection with Town Landing Road.

The market became noted for a sign on its frontage stating that the business sells "fresh native ice cubes." In 1991, the market was featured in a Fourth of July national television commercial for Coca-Cola.

In 1907, the building was the home of H. J. Poland, Fruit and Confectioner, while a few years later it became Calden's ice-cream parlor. It was equipped with gas pumps around the same time. It was given its current name in 1940.

Tom Randall owned the property between 1952 and 1981. Later owners include Dan Groves (between 1981 and 2015) and MaryBeth Bachman (2015 to 2022). It was purchased in 2022 by Sam and Caitlin Reiche. It is run by Big Tree Hospitality.
