= Gyger House =

Historic house in Cumberland Foreside, Maine

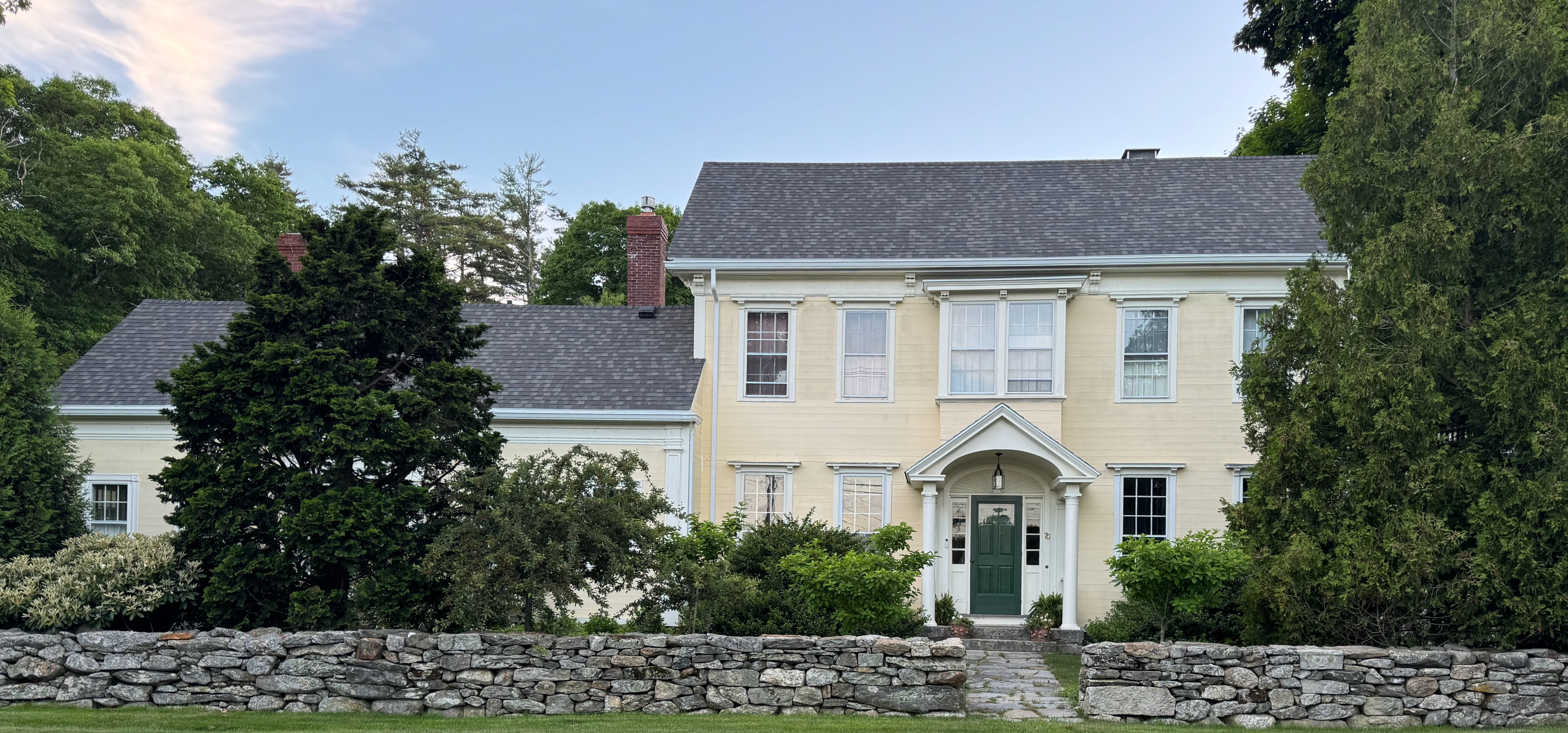
- The home in 2024
- Interactive map of the Gyger House area

General information
- Location: Cumberland Foreside, Maine, U.S., 70 Foreside Road
- Coordinates: 43.74917°N 70.20193°W
- Completed: c. 1780 (246 years ago)

Technical details
- Floor count: 2

The Gyger House is a historic home in Cumberland Foreside, Maine, United States. Located at 70 Foreside Road (Maine State Route 88), it contains several eras of construction, with the oldest being mid-to-late 18th century, around fifty years before Cumberland's secession from North Yarmouth occurred. Other sections of the home date to the 1860s and 1920s.

The historic section of Foreside Road on which is stands, known as the Sturdivant neighborhood, includes the Ephraim Sturdivant House at 114 Foreside Road (completed in 1810), 77 Foreside Road (1873) and 74 Foreside Road (1850).
