= Princes Point Road =

Prominent street in Yarmouth, Maine

Coordinates: 43.780587°N 70.167412°W

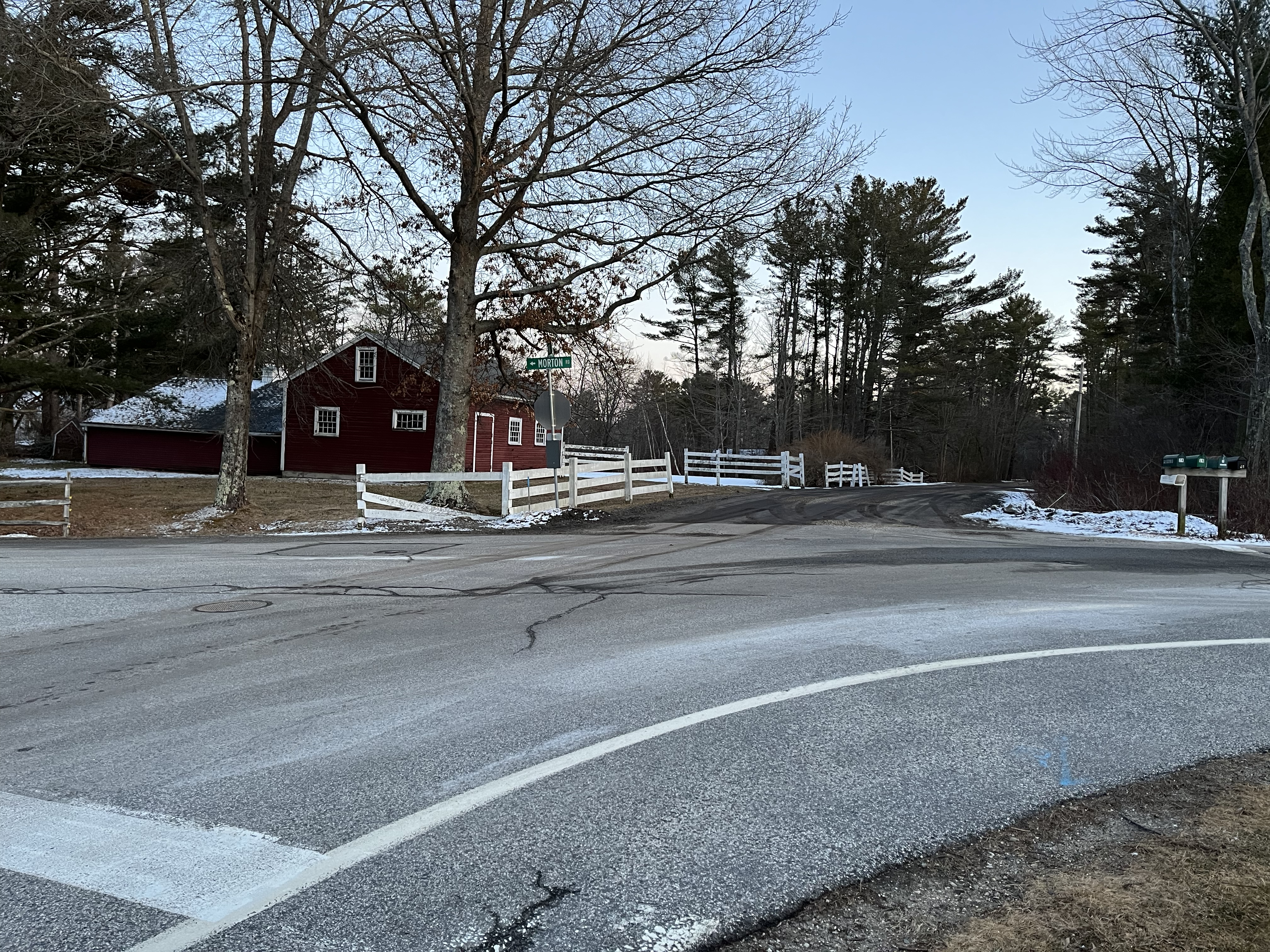
- The southern end of Princes Point at its intersection with (l-r) Morton Road, Old Town Landing Road and Sunset Point Road
- Interactive map of Princes Point Road
- Length: 1.93 mi (3.11 km)
- Location: Yarmouth, Maine, U.S.
- Northern end: Lafayette Street (Maine State Route 88)
- Southern end: Sunset Point Road

Construction
- Completion: c. 1780 (246 years ago)

Princes Point Road is a prominent street in Yarmouth, Maine, United States. It runs for about 1.93 miles (3.11 km) from Lafayette Street (State Route 88) in the north to Sunset Point Road in the south. It was one of the first streets laid out in the town when it was centered around the Meetinghouse under the Ledge in the 18th century. Gilman Road, another of the early roads in the area, intersects Princes Point Road near its northern end.

In the late 19th century, trolleycars of the short-lived Portland and Yarmouth Electric Railway passed Princes Point Road en route to Yarmouth's village center after the town's population had moved away from the Broad Cove area.

Yarmouth's West Side Trail crosses Princes Point Road between Gilman Road and Morton Road.

The road is named for the Paul Prince (1720–1809), who served for Massachusetts in the American Revolutionary War.

== Notable buildings and structures ==
Established in 1923, the Westcustogo Inn stands at the northern end of Princes Point Road, facing the traffic triangle at its intersection with Lafayette Street and the southern end of Pleasant Street. The inn was in business, albeit not continuously, for 83 years.

68 Princes Point Road, located just north of Whitcombs Way, is the former schoolhouse of District Number 2. It was converted to a home around 1940.

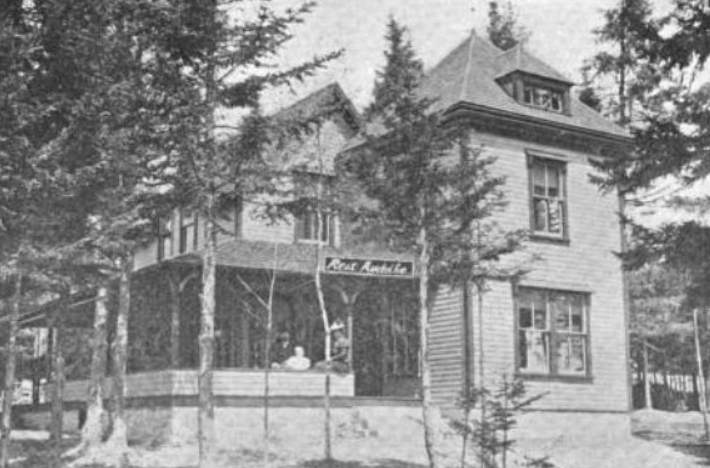
Leone R. Cook's now-demolished cottage "Rest Awhile", pictured around the turn of the 20th century

The 1831-built home at 420 Princes Point Road, a short distance north of the Morton Road intersection, is the former residence of Captain Nicholas Drinkwater, Sr. Captain Sumner Drinkwater (1859–1942) was born in this house.

Mrs. Snell lived at the southeastern corner of the Old Town Landing Road and Morton Road intersection, where Princes Point Road turns southwest. (Morton Road is named for Harry Newbert Morton, who built the first house on the street. A lobsterman, Morton moved to Yarmouth in 1929 and remained there until his death at the age of 89.)

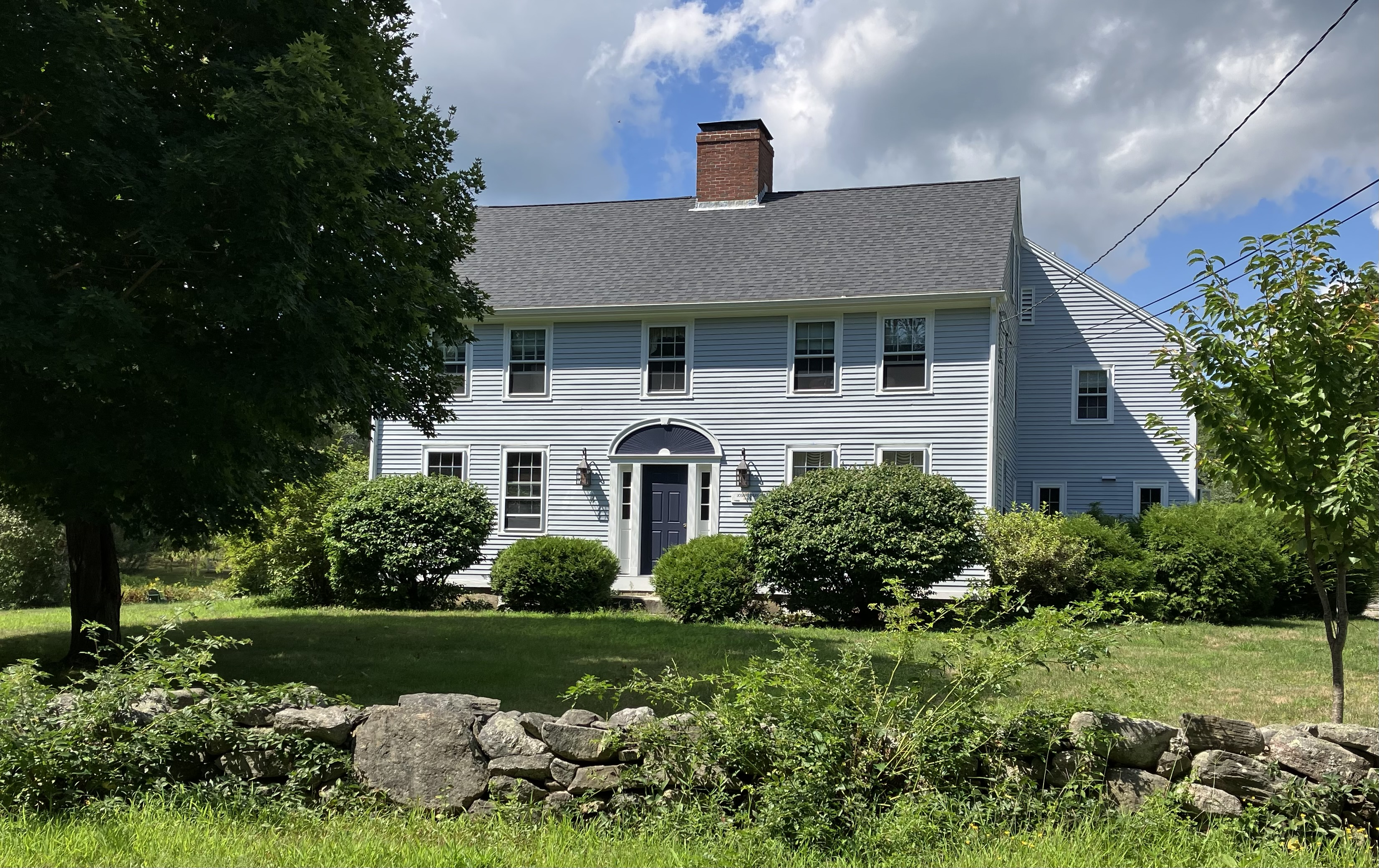
The Joseph Gray House at 581 Princes Point Road

In the early 1880s, Princes Point began to develop as a summer colony. For several years it had become a favorite camping spot for the villagers and the inhabitants of the inland parts of the town who came here for clam bakes and picnics. The town road ended at the John Allen Drinkwater barn, and here a large gate opened into the pasture which included the two points now known as Princes Point and Sunset Point. Captain Rotheus Drinkwater also had a home a stone's throw away. Captain John Cleaves fenced off a spot on his farm, at today's number 581, for the same purpose.

Another sea captain, Joseph Gray (1734–1792), lived at today's 581 Princes Point Road, which dates to the 18th century

The first cottage was built in 1884. It was later known as Battery Point Cottage. Others soon built nearby, including Dr. Herbert A. Merrill, Leone R. Cook's (a cottage named "Rest Awhile"), George H. Jefferds, Thomas and Nellie Johnston and Wilfred W. Dunn. The first to take up a lot on the western promontory now known as Sunset Point was Samuel O. Carruthers.

In 1894 a wharf was built, and the steamer Madeleine made two trips daily from Portland, stopping off at the Cumberland and Falmouth Foresides. The short-lived electric railroad running the same route forced the discontinuation of the service.

In 1899, a four-storey hotel of about thirty rooms, named Gem of the Bay, was built on Princes Point by Cornelius Harris. It was destroyed by fire in October 1900 after two seasons in business.
