= Paul Prince (patriot) =

- Born: May 14, 1720; Duxbury, Province of Massachusetts Bay
- Died: November 25, 1809 (aged 89); North Yarmouth, Massachusetts, U.S.
- Spouse: Hannah Cushing (1743–1809; his death)

Paul Prince (May 14, 1720 – November 25, 1809) was a patriot in the American Revolutionary War.

== Life and career ==
Prince was born in Duxbury, Province of Massachusetts Bay, in 1720, a second son to shipwright Benjamin Prince and Abial Nelson. While Princes Point Road in Yarmouth, Maine, is named for Paul, Princes Point itself is named for his father, who died, aged 44, when Paul was seventeen years old; his mother died when he was twenty-four.

He married Hannah Cushing (1722–1814) in 1743. The couple had ten children, including Cushing Prince in 1745. The other nine were Sarah (born 1744), Rachel (1747), Hannah (1749), Ruth (1751), David (1753), Else (1756), Paul Jr. (1758), Pyam (1760) and Ammi (1763). Prince compiled a book, known as the Paul Prince Bible, containing the record of births of his children. It was printed in Edinburgh in 1791.

Between 1775 and 1779, both Paul Sr. and Paul Jr. are listed as serving in the Cumberland County Regiment during the Revolutionary War.

== Death ==
Prince died in North Yarmouth, Massachusetts (now in Maine), in 1809, aged 89. He is interred in Congregational Cemetery in Cumberland Center, Maine, beside his wife, who survived him by just over four years.
