= Princes Point =

- Promontory
- Interactive map of Princes Point
- Coordinates: 43.76214604°N 70.17449876°W
- Country: United States
- State: Maine
- County: Cumberland
- Town: Yarmouth
- Time zone: UTC-5 (Eastern (EST))
  - Summer (DST): UTC-4 (EDT)

Princes Point is a promontory in Yarmouth, Maine, United States. It is located around 2.70 miles (4.35 km) south of Yarmouth Village and looks out into inner Casco Bay. Princes Point Road leads to the point, which is named for shipwright Benjamin Prince, while Princes Point Road is named for his son, Paul Prince. They were both relatives of poet Elizabeth Oakes Smith. The point was part of an estate purchased by the Prince family in 1680.

When Yarmouth residents voted to secede from North Yarmouth in the mid-19th century, Princes Point residents were against the plan. As historian Alan M. Hall noted: "Coastal farms, such as the Nicholas Drinkwater homestead on Princes Point [Road], were often perched on more ledges than topsoil, a fact that nudged many Drinkwaters into a life at sea."

In the early 1880s, Princes Point began to develop as a summer colony. For several years it had become a favorite camping spot for the villagers and the inhabitants of the inland parts of the town who came here for clam bakes and picnics. The town road ended at the John Allen Drinkwater barn, and here a large gate opened into the pasture which included the two points.

A short-lived steamship line ferried passengers to and from Princes Point aboard the Madeleine.

In 1905, property owners on Princes Point formed a Princes Point Improvement Association.

Mrs. Bagley's Camp, a summer camp for boys, was held at the point in the early 20th century.
