= Broad Cove, Maine =

Broad Cove
- Cove
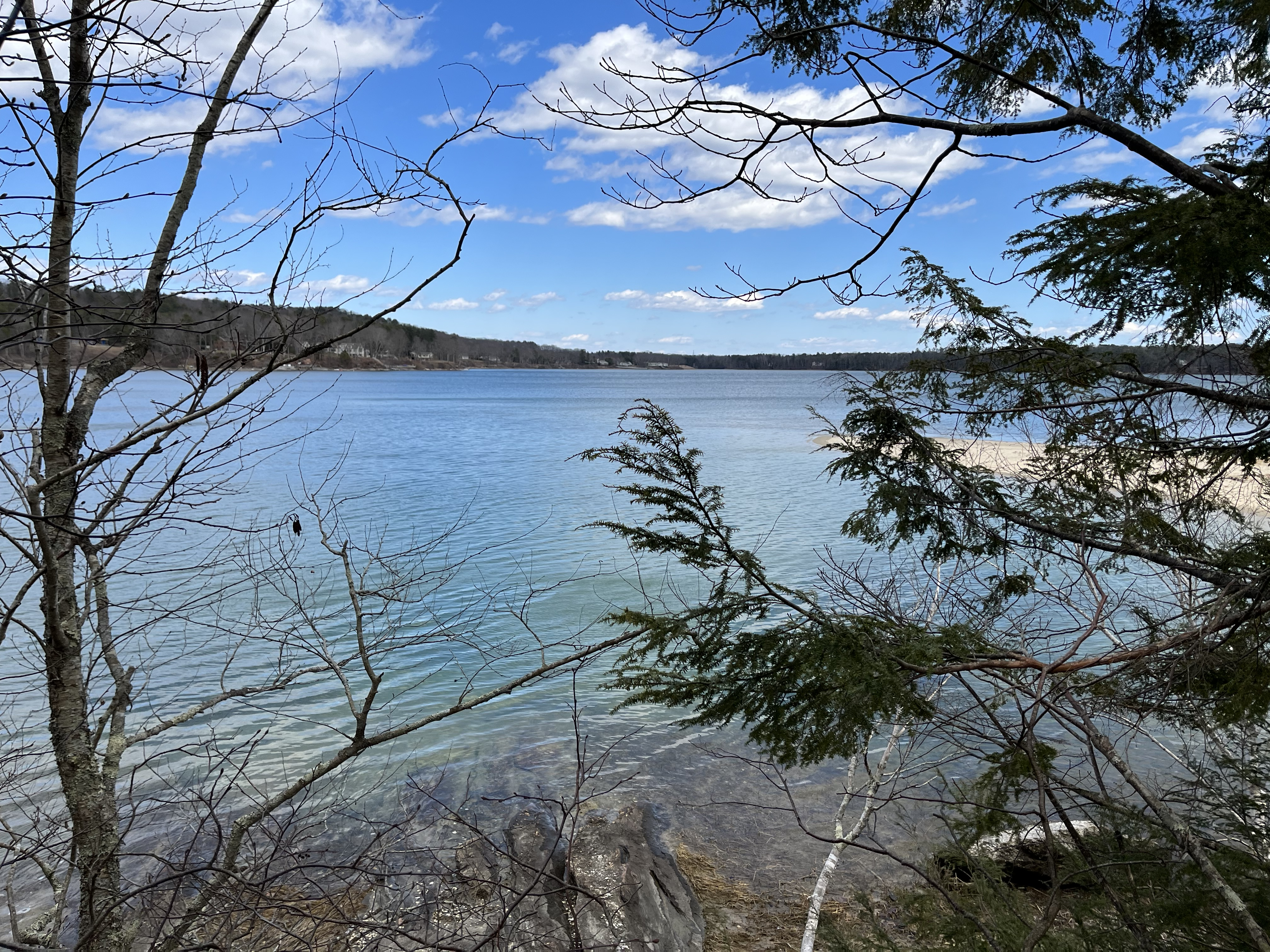
- Looking north from around the cove's midpoint in coastal Cumberland
- Interactive map of Broad Cove
- Coordinates: 43.76288587°N 70.187375206°W
- Country: United States
- State: Maine
- County: Cumberland
- Towns: Yarmouth and Cumberland Foreside
- Time zone: UTC-5 (Eastern (EST))
  - Summer (DST): UTC-4 (EDT)

Broad Cove is a prominent cove in Yarmouth, Maine, United States. It is around 1.5 miles (2.4 km) long and around 1 mile (1.6 km) wide at its mouth at inner Casco Bay. It sits between Sunset Point, at the southern end of Yarmouth, and the eastern edge of Cumberland Foreside. State Route 88 (formerly the Atlantic Highway) runs beside the cove (as Foreside Road south of the Yarmouth line and Lafayette Street beyond it).

== History ==
In 1643, Englishman George Felt, who came to what was then North Yarmouth, Massachusetts Bay Colony, from Charlestown, Boston, eleven years earlier, purchased 300 acres (120 ha) in Broad Cove from Welshman John Phillips.

Later in the 17th century, Walter Gendall's farm incorporated the western end of the cove, at Duck Cove.

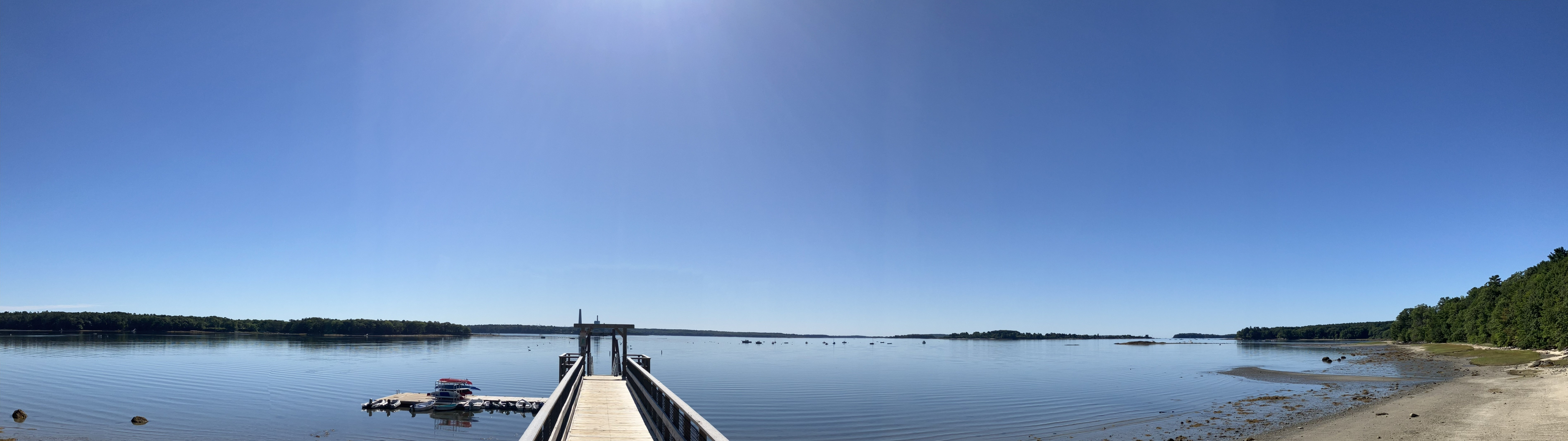
Panoramic view of Broad Cove from the town landing at today's Broad Cove Reserve in Cumberland Foreside. The stacks of Wyman Power Station, on Cousins Island, are in view straight ahead
