= Maine State Route 88 =

State highway in southern Maine

State Route 88

Route information
- Maintained by MaineDOT
- Length: 8.37 mi (13.47 km)

Major junctions
- South end: US 1 in Falmouth
- SR 115 in Yarmouth
- North end: US 1 in Yarmouth

Location
- Country: United States
- State: Maine
- Counties: Cumberland

Highway system
- Maine State Highway System; Interstate; US; State; Auto trails; Lettered highways
← SR 86	→ SR 89

State Route 88 (SR 88) is a state highway in southern Maine, United States. It runs south to north for 8.37 miles (13.47 km), from U.S. Route 1 (US 1) in Falmouth to US 1 in Yarmouth. It runs to the east of US 1, and its speed limit is 35 miles per hour (56 km/h). Over its course, its furthest distance from US 1 is about 1/2 mile (0.80 km). This occurs in its Falmouth Foreside section.

== Route description ==
The route is connected to US 1 directly at SR 88's two termini. It is also connected to US 1 indirectly, by a ramp, via Tuttle Road in Cumberland Foreside. Its name changes four times en route. It is Foreside Road between the southern terminus and the Yarmouth town line beside Broad Cove, at which point it becomes Lafayette Street. It then becomes East Main Street just before the Royal River's First Falls, before finishing as Spring Street.

"Herbie", New England's oldest and largest elm tree for the final thirteen years of its existence, stood on Route 88 (East Main Street) in Yarmouth, at its intersection with Yankee Drive, between 1793 and 2010.

SR 88 is mostly residential, although businesses are located on it at several points. These include (traveling nortbound) Portland Country Club, Skillins garden center and The Dockside Grill (all in Falmouth); Town Landing Market (which was once featured in a national Coca-Cola television commercial) (Falmouth Foreside); and the Lower Falls Landing plaza (Yarmouth). Each of these examples are situated on the northbound (eastern) side of the highway.

The section of road that runs between the Pleasant Street loop in Yarmouth did not formally exist prior to the construction of Route 88. Its predecessor, the Atlantic Highway, followed Pleasant Street. It was in this section that, in 1720, a young Massachusetts native, Gilbert Winslow, erected a saw mill on Atwell's Creek (which became known colloquially as Folly Creek, due to this venture, which was expected to fail). The creek was "a considerable watercourse then"; now, though, it is nothing more than a tidal inlet.

== Junction list ==
The entire route is in Cumberland County.

Location	mi	km	Destinations	Notes
Falmouth	0.00	0.00	US 1 – Portland, Yarmouth	
Yarmouth	7.52	12.10	SR 115 west (Marina Road) – Gray	Eastern terminus of SR 115
Yarmouth	8.37	13.47	US 1 to I-295 – Yarmouth, Freeport	
1.000 mi = 1.609 km; 1.000 km = 0.621 mi

== See also ==
- Gyger House, 70 Foreside Road
- Ephraim Sturdivant House, 114 Foreside Road
