= Falmouth Foreside =

- Census-designated place
- Town landing at Falmouth Foreside

- Location in Cumberland County and the state of Maine
- Coordinates: 43°44′04″N 70°12′54″W
- Country: United States
- State: Maine
- County: Cumberland
- Town: Falmouth

Area
  - Total: 1.66 sq mi (4.31 km^{2})
  - Land: 1.52 sq mi (3.94 km^{2})
  - Water: 0.14 sq mi (0.37 km^{2})
- Elevation: 115 ft (35 m)

Population (2020)
  - Total: 1,554
  - Density: 1,020.8/sq mi (394.13/km^{2})
- Time zone: UTC-5 (Eastern (EST))
  - Summer (DST): UTC-4 (EDT)
- ZIP Code: 04105 (Falmouth)
- Area code: 207
- FIPS code: 23-24530
- GNIS feature ID: 2377907

Falmouth Foreside is a census-designated place (CDP) within the town of Falmouth in Cumberland County, Maine, United States. As of the 2010 census, the CDP population was 1,511. It is part of the Portland–South Portland–Biddeford, Maine Metropolitan Statistical Area.

== Geography ==
According to the United States Census Bureau, the CDP has a total area of 1.7 square miles (4.3 km^{2}), of which 1.5 square miles (3.9 km^{2}) is land and 0.15 square miles (0.4 km^{2}), or 8.69%, is water.

== Demographics ==
Historical population
| Census | Pop. | Note | %± |
|---|---|---|---|
| 2020 | 1,554 | | — |
U.S. Decennial Census

As of the census of 2000, there were 1,964 people, 746 households, and 511 families residing in the CDP. The population density was 829.8 inhabitants per square mile (320.4/km^{2}). There were 794 housing units at an average density of 335.5 per square mile (129.5/km^{2}). The racial makeup of the CDP was 99.13% White, 0.41% Asian, 0.10% from other races, and 0.36% from two or more races. Hispanic or Latino of any race were 0.25% of the population.

There were 746 households, out of which 31.4% had children under the age of 18 living with them, 59.8% were married couples living together, 7.5% had a female householder with no husband present, and 31.4% were non-families. 26.8% of all households were made up of individuals, and 13.8% had someone living alone who was 65 years of age or older. The average household size was 2.38 and the average family size was 2.92.

In the CDP, the population was spread out, with 22.9% under the age of 18, 2.5% from 18 to 24, 22.4% from 25 to 44, 24.8% from 45 to 64, and 27.3% who were 65 years of age or older. The median age was 46 years. For every 100 females, there were 80.2 males. For every 100 females age 18 and over, there were 73.0 males.

The median income for a household in the CDP was $67,750, and the median income for a family was $87,382. Males had a median income of $50,441 versus $37,708 for females. The per capita income for the CDP was $36,602. About 1.2% of families and 2.4% of the population were below the poverty line, including 3.4% of those under age 18 and 2.0% of those age 65 or over.

== See also ==
- Town Landing Market
