= Means House =

Means House may refer to:

- Orna Villa, known also as Alexander Means House, Oxford, Georgia, NRHP-listed
- Emily Means House, South Bristol, Maine, NRHP-listed
- Means House (Jonesville, South Carolina), NRHP-listed
- V. R. Means House, Belton, Texas, NRHP-listed
- Means-Justiss House, Paris, Texas, NRHP-listed

== See also ==
- Means Street Historic District, Atlanta, Georgia, NRHP-listed
