= Harrington Meeting House =

Historic church in Maine, United States

- Harrington Meetinghouse
- U.S. National Register of Historic Places
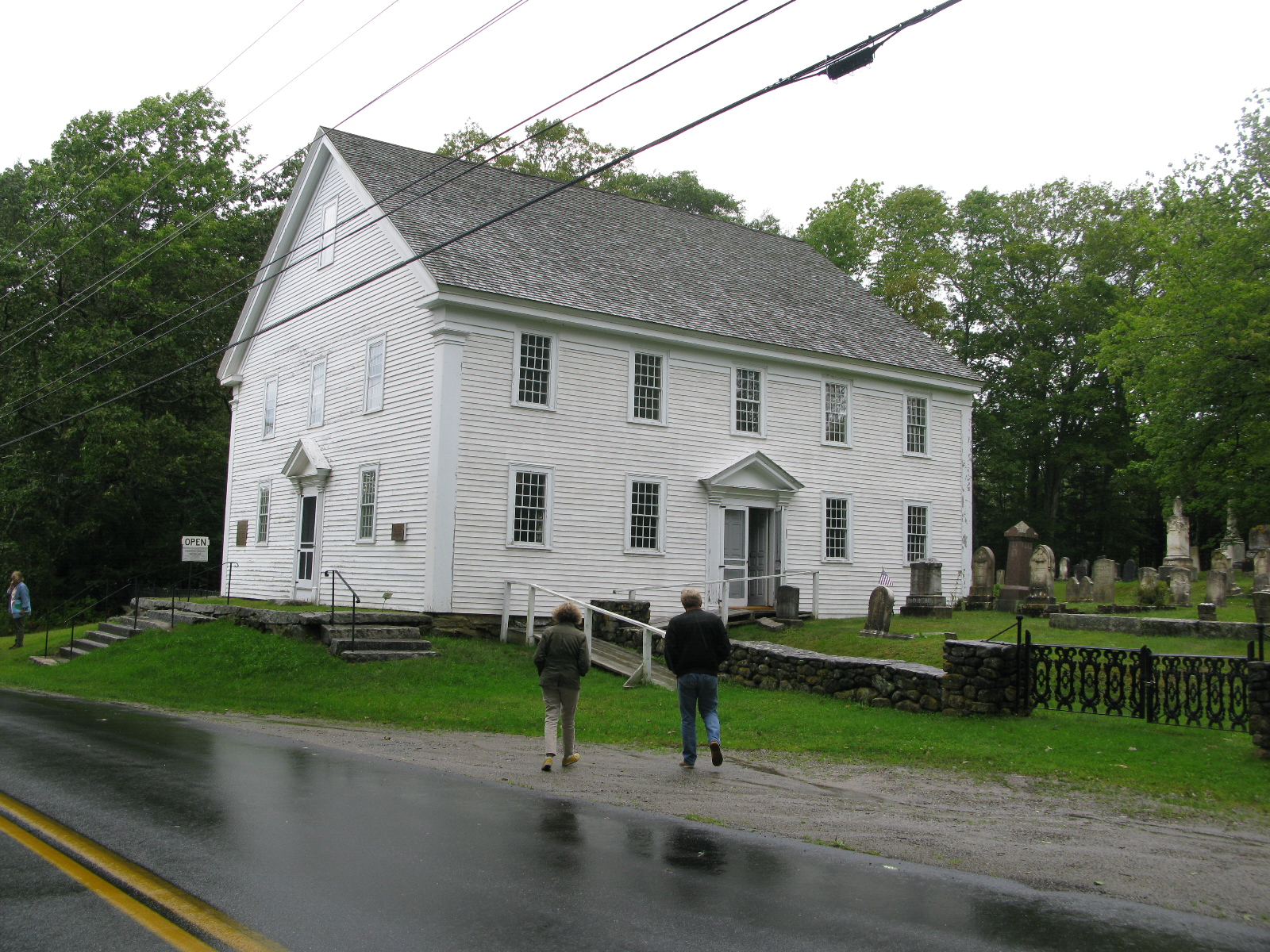

- Location within Maine Location within the United States
- Location: 278 Harrington Rd., Bristol, Maine
- Coordinates: 43°54′53″N 69°31′43″W
- Area: 1.4 acres (0.57 ha)
- Built: 1773
- NRHP reference No.: 70000051
- Added to NRHP: May 19, 1970

The Harrington Meeting House is a historic colonial meeting house at 278 Harrington Road in Bristol, Maine. Built in 1772 and moved to its present site in 1775, it is one of the town's original three meeting houses. It contains a small museum of old photographs, clothing, and books. The adjoining cemetery has gravestones of historical interest. The building was added to the National Register of Historic Places as Harrington Meetinghouse in 1970.

== History ==
When Bristol was settled the land area was larger than today and the distance required to travel to the meeting house was such that three meeting houses were built to serve the Presbyterian population, the others being at Broad Cove (destroyed) and the Walpole Meetinghouse. The framing for the Harrington meeting house was originally erected in the village of Bristol Mills in 1772 but was "pulled down" and re-erected at the head of John's Bay in 1773. Bristol voters accepted all three meeting houses in 1775.

In about 1850 the building was moved several hundred yards to its current location and the interior altered. The interior was made into a "back to" or "reverse plan" arrangement which means the entry doors are behind the pulpit. The windows and doors were changed and a cove, plaster ceiling installed. John Johnston's A History of Bristol and Bremen indicated that the original meeting house had been destroyed, but in 1960 Ilonka Fertig spearheaded a repair of the existing meeting house only to find evidence the building was the original meeting house from 1772. By 1970 they mostly restored the building to its original configuration, but the pews were left out of the gallery which now houses museum displays and the plaster ceiling was left out to allow a view of the unusual roof framing.

== Description ==
The roof framing consists of king post trusses with a double top chord (or top chord and rafter). This type of king post truss is rare but other examples have been noted in such as in the 1714 Lynnfield, Massachusetts meeting house, 1800 Congregational Church in Windham, Vermont, and the 1799 Strafford, Vermont meeting house.

== See also ==
- National Register of Historic Places listings in Lincoln County, Maine
