= Lithgow House =

Historic house in Maine, United States

- U.S. National Register of Historic Places
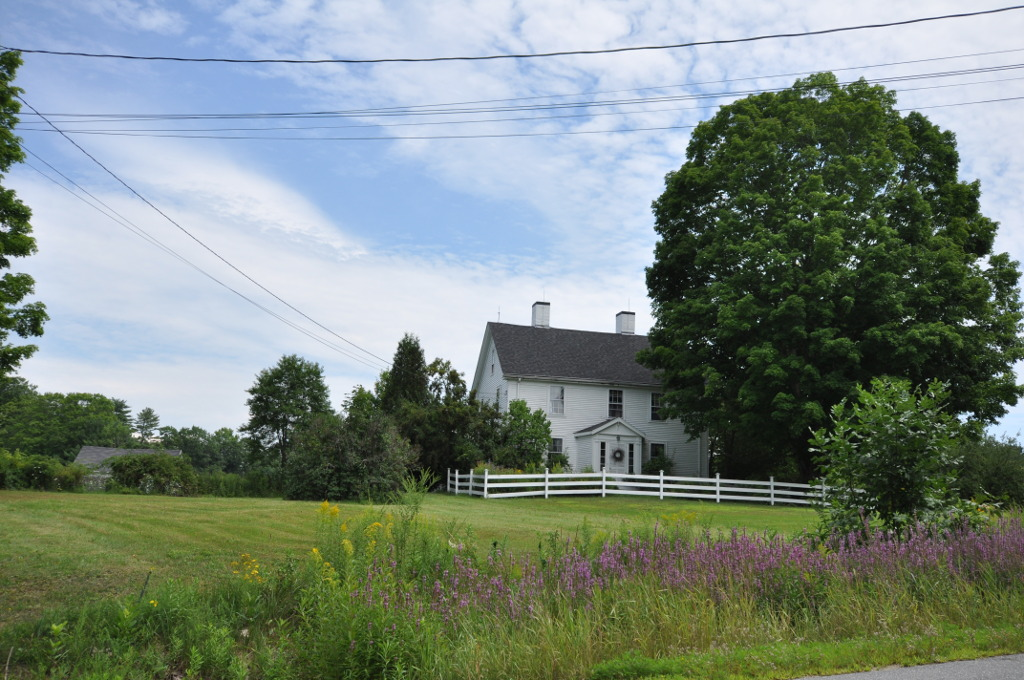

- Location within Maine Location within the United States
- Location: Blinn Hill Rd., Dresden, Maine
- Coordinates: 44°6′36″N 69°43′5″W
- Area: 1 acre (0.40 ha)
- Built: 1819
- NRHP reference No.: 85003156
- Added to NRHP: December 26, 1985

The Lithgow House is a historic house on Blinn Hill Road in Dresden, Maine. Built about 1819, it is a little-altered Federal period house, distinctive for an extremely unusual floor plan. It was listed on the National Register of Historic Places in 1985.

== Description and history ==
The Lithgow House stands northeast of the village of Dresden Mills, on the north side of Blinn Hill Road near the local cemetery. It is a 2 1/2-story wood-frame structure, with a side-gable roof pierced by two brick chimneys, and clapboard siding. The main facade faces south, and consists of three slightly asymmetrical bays. The entrance is in a gabled vestibule projecting from the center bay, flanked by sidelight windows. The interior retains many original period features, including woodwork and door hardware. The vestibule has two separate entrances into the two parlor rooms at the front of the house, which are also connected to each other by a wide pair of double-hinged door. The room originally serving as the kitchen is behind the left parlor, with a winding stair in a narrow hall between the two chimneys. A single-story ell, of mid-19th century construction, extends to the rear and provides a more modern kitchen space. The property also includes a barn of mid-19th century vintage.

The land on which this house was built was originally owned by James Lithgow, an early settler of this portion of the Kennebec River valley. In 1818 he divided it between his two sons, Alfred and Llewellyn, one of whom probably built this house before 1820. This determination is made primarily based on the style of the interior woodwork. The Lithgows were prominent local citizens, with Llewellyn operating a sawmill and gristmill, and financially underwriting the Bridge Academy. Later owners include Dr. Horatio Allen, one of the town's first physicians.

== See also ==
- National Register of Historic Places listings in Lincoln County, Maine
