= St. John's Episcopal Church (Dresden Mills, Maine) =

Historic church in Maine, United States

- U.S. National Register of Historic Places
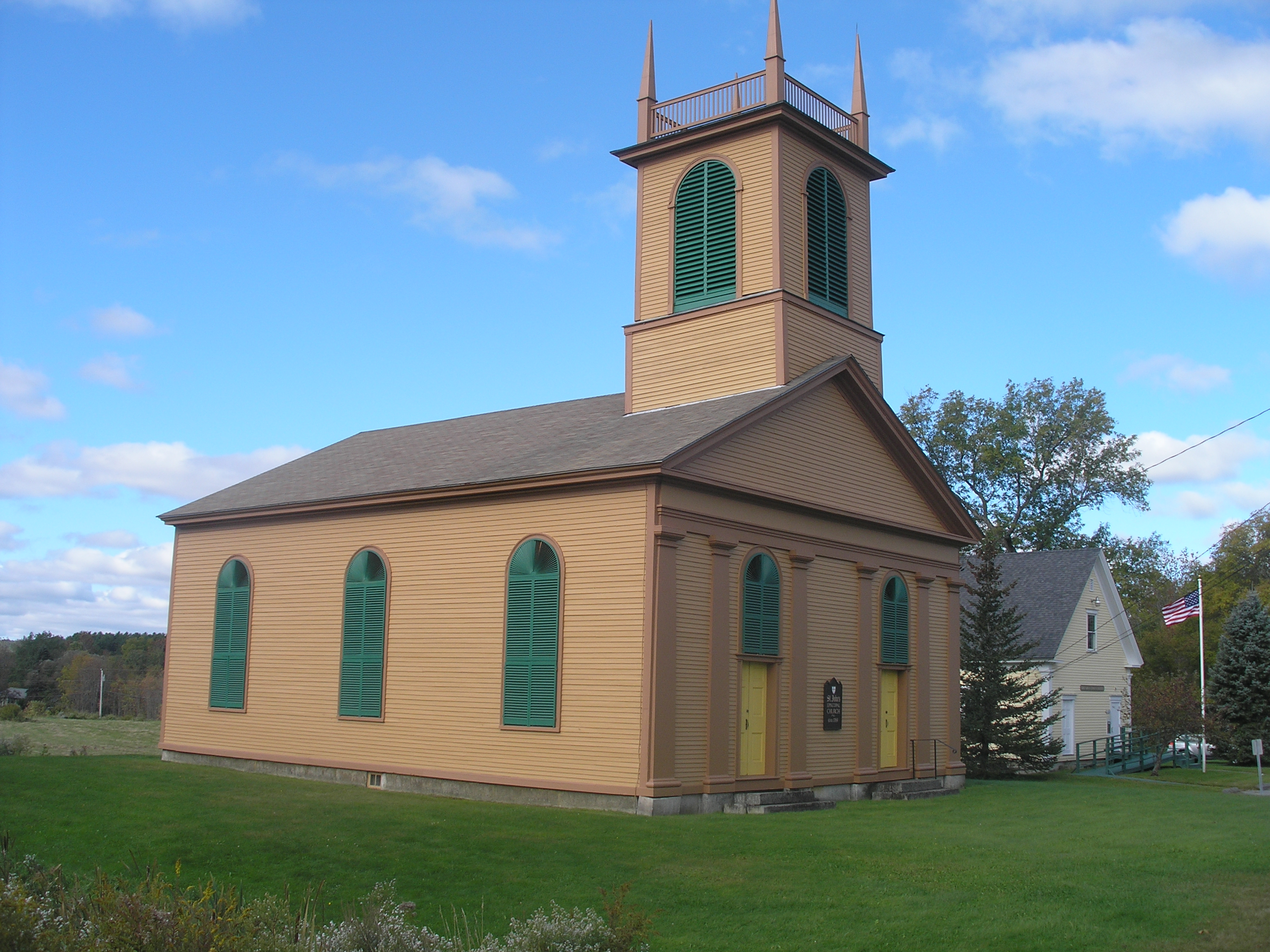

- Location within Maine Location within the United States
- Location: S side of ME 27 at jct. with Blinn Hill Rd., Dresden Mills, Maine
- Coordinates: 44°6′24″N 69°43′25″W
- Area: less than one acre
- Built: 1832
- Architectural style: Greek Revival, Gothic Revival, Federal
- NRHP reference No.: 91000769
- Added to NRHP: June 14, 1991

St. John's Episcopal Church is a historic church on the south side of Maine State Route 27 at Blinn Hill Road in Dresden Mills, Maine. Built in 1832, it is a distinctive architectural blend of Federal, Greek Revival and Gothic Revival styling. It was listed on the National Register of Historic Places in 1991.

== Description and history ==
St. John's Episcopal Church stands in the village of Dresden Mills, just east of the Dresden town offices on the south side of SR 27. It is a single-story wood-frame structure, with a gabled roof, clapboard siding, and granite foundation. A two-stage square tower rises from the roof, with a belfry in the second stage that has louvered round-arch openings, and pinnacled corners joined by a balustrade above. The front facade is symmetrical, with pilasters at the corners and on either side of the two entrances, rising to an entablature and fully pedimented gable. The doorways are set in otherwise simple openings, but are topped by Federal style round-arch louvered windows. Similar windows, taller in height, rise on the sides. The interior features an unusual mix of Federal and Gothic styling, with original box pews and a Romanesque screen separating the sanctuary from the vestry.

The church was built in 1832 as a union church, serving four congregations, and was formally dedicated the following year. It was built as a virtual duplicate of the Pittston Congregational Church, differing now due to subsequent alterations to each building. In 1852 it was dedicated exclusively for use by the Episcopal congregation, which named in St. John's, after an earlier church in Dresden that has not survived.

== See also ==
- National Register of Historic Places listings in Lincoln County, Maine
