= Waldoborough Town Pound =

- U.S. National Register of Historic Places
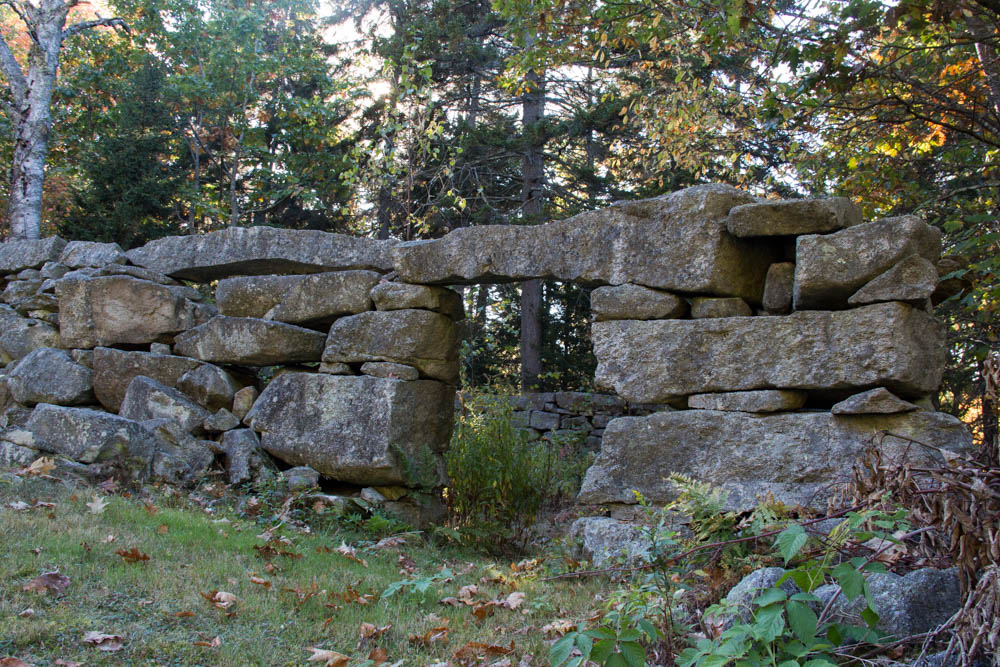

- Location within Maine
- Location: Main St., Waldoboro, Maine
- Coordinates: 44°6′5″N 69°22′12″W
- Area: 1 acre (0.40 ha)
- Built: 1819
- NRHP reference No.: 76000103
- Added to NRHP: May 28, 1976

The Waldoborough Town Pound is a historic animal pound on Main Street (Maine State Route 220) in Waldoboro, Maine. Built in 1819, the stone structure is an important reminder of the town's agricultural past, and one of a few such structures of its type to survive in the state. It was listed on the National Register of Historic Places in 1976.

== Description and history ==
The Waldoborough Town Pound is located on the west side of Main Street, south of United States Route 1 and just north of the Waldoboro Historical Society museum. It is a roughly rectangular structure, measuring 45 by 55 feet (14 m × 17 m), with its short face oriented toward the road. Its walls are fashioned out of uncoursed rough cut dry laid fieldstone, with a cap layer of squared granite slabs that have been fastened into the wall by large hand-forged staples driven through hand-drilled holes. The single entrance to the structure is located at the northern end of the street facade, with a single large slab of granite acting as a lintel over the opening. The opening would have been enclosed by a wooden gate during the pound's period of use.

Waldoboro's first town pound was a wooden structured erected in 1785, as a place to pen stray agricultural animals until they could be reclaimed by their owners. The present structure was authorized by the town in 1819, and fell out of use after the adoption of more scientific agricultural animal control practices. It is now owned and maintained by the historical society.

== See also ==
- National Register of Historic Places listings in Lincoln County, Maine
