= Godfrey Ludwig House =

Historic house in Maine, United States

- U.S. National Register of Historic Places
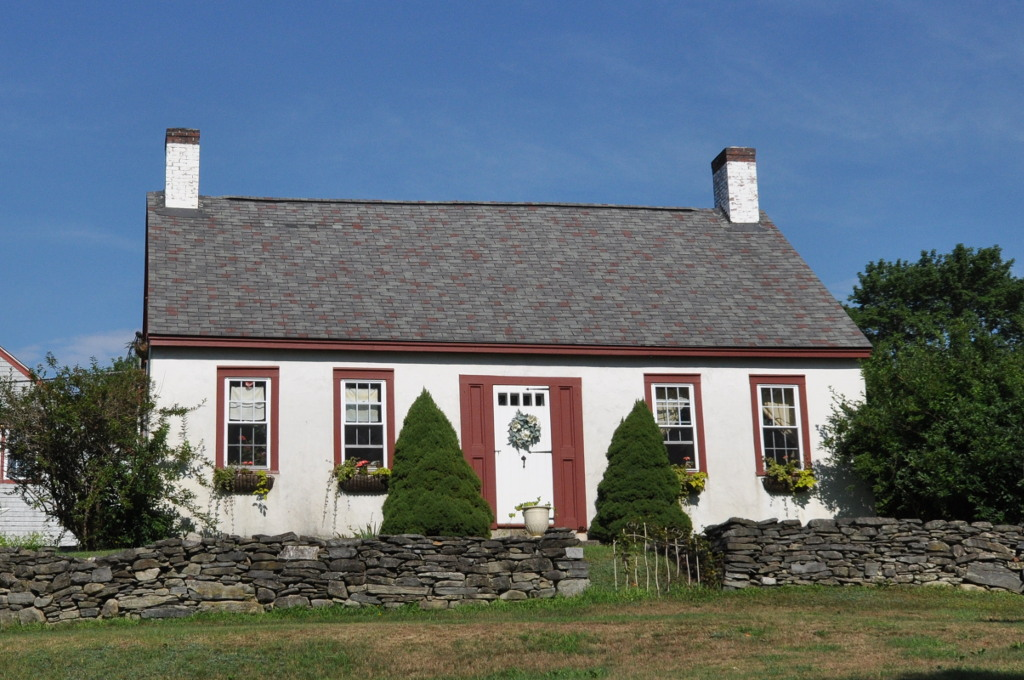

- Location within Maine Location within the United States
- Location: SR 32, Waldoboro, Maine
- Coordinates: 44°9′33″N 69°25′0″W
- Area: 0.5 acres (0.20 ha)
- Built: 1800
- Built by: Ludwig, Godfrey
- Architectural style: Cape Cod
- NRHP reference No.: 80000238
- Added to NRHP: September 22, 1980

The Godfrey Ludwig House is a historic house on Maine State Route 32 in Waldoboro, Maine. Built about 1800, it is a well-preserved brick Cape house, built by a descendant of one of the area's early German immigrants. It is notable for features enabling its use as a church. It was listed on the National Register of Historic Places in 1980.

== Description and history ==
The Godfrey Ludwig House stands on the west side of SR 32 in northern Waldoboro, roughly midway between the town center and that of neighboring Jefferson. The house is a 1 1/2-story brick Cape style house, with a side gable roof, end chimneys, and a granite foundation. The brick walls are painted white. Its street-facing front facade is five bays wide, with a center entrance flanked by recessed sidelight windows. A wood-frame ell with cross-gable roof extends from the rear of the main block. The interior of the house follows a center hall plan. The halls side walls are fitted with special hinged panel sections, making it possible to create a single large chamber out of the hall and the flanking parlors.

The house was built about 1800 by Godfrey Ludwig, the nephew of, and heir to, Joseph Ludwig, the first German immigrant from the population that settled Waldoboro to win election to the colonial legislature. Godfrey Ludwig was not as prominent as his uncle, but he was a devout Methodist, and his house became a stop on a circuit traveled by Methodist ministers. About 1820, the interior was modified so that it could accommodate the religious services of these ministers.

== See also ==
- National Register of Historic Places listings in Lincoln County, Maine
