= Dresden Town House =

- U.S. National Register of Historic Places
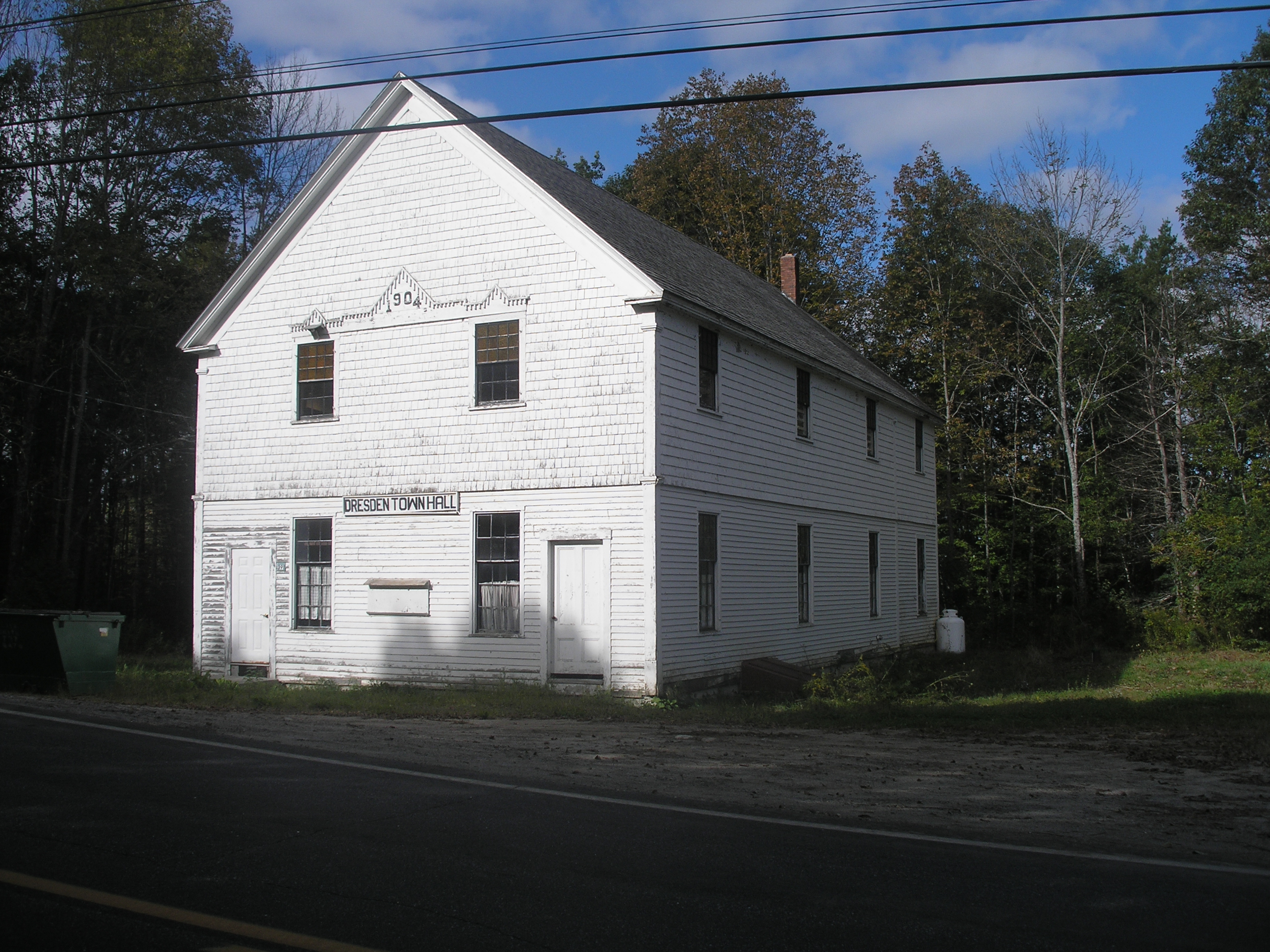

- Location within Maine Location within the United States
- Location: 391 Middle Rd., Dresden Mills, Maine
- Coordinates: 44°5′8″N 69°44′37″W
- Area: less than one acre
- Built: 1859
- Built by: George F. Houdlette
- Architectural style: Late Victorian
- NRHP reference No.: 00001204
- Added to NRHP: October 12, 2000

The Dresden Town House is a historic civic and social venue at 391 Middle Road in Dresden, Maine. Built in 1859 and enlarged in 1904, it has housed town meetings for many years, as well as serving as a polling place and venue for social events such as dances and community group meetings. It was listed on the National Register of Historic Places in 2000.

== Description and history ==
The Dresden Town House is located on the west side of Middle Road (Maine State Route 127), a short way north of its junction with Maine State Route 197, in a rural area known as Dresden Mills. It is a long two-story wood-frame structure, with a gabled roof, exterior of wooden shingles (upper floor) and clapboards (ground floor), and is set on piers of concrete and granite. Its front facaden is symmetrical, with entrances set near the outer corners and sash windows to the interior. The upper level has two sash windows, which are topped by triangular hoods. The decorative line of these hoods is extended to a larger central triangular peak, under which the year 1904 is marked. The interior has meeting spaces on both floors, with the ground floor vestibule housing the town's American Civil War memorial. The upper hall's ceiling is pressed tin.

Construction of a single-story town house was authorized by the town in 1859 and dedicated the following year. The building housed the town meeting space, and offices of the selectmen, and was rented out for other functions. It housed the district 5 school when that building burned down. In 1901 the town made an agreement with the local Grange chapter for the addition of a second floor, which was completed in 1904. The Grange ceased operations in 1969, but the building continues to be used for community and civic functions.

== See also ==
- National Register of Historic Places listings in Lincoln County, Maine
