= Clary Mill =

Historic place in Whitefield, Maine, US

- U.S. National Register of Historic Places
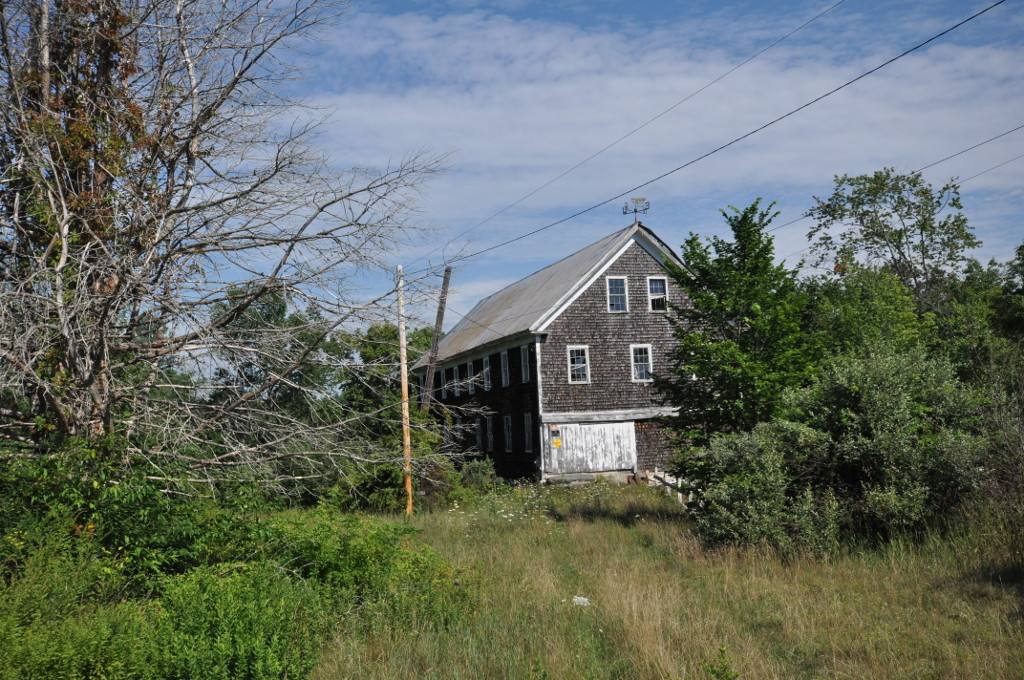

- Location within Maine Location within the United States
- Location: 104 Mills Rd., Whitefield, Maine
- Coordinates: 44°13′42″N 69°35′3″W
- Area: 3 acres (1.2 ha)
- Built: 1893
- Architectural style: Late Victorian
- NRHP reference No.: 04001283
- Added to NRHP: December 2, 2004

The Clary Mill is a historic mill building and associated water-control structures at 104 Mills Road in Whitefield, Maine. The property includes a late 19th-century wooden mill, a mill pond, dam and penstock. It is the last surviving sawmill in the town, which was once heavily dependent on the lumber industry. It was listed on the National Register of Historic Places in 2004.

== Description and history ==
The Clary Mill is set a short way north of the village of North Whitefield, on the banks of an unnamed stream that feeds into the Sheepscot River a short way to its west. The mill property is divided by Mills Road (Maine State Route 218), with the mill building on the west side of the road, and the mill pond, forming the outlet of the larger Clary Lake on the east side. The Clary Mill is one of several mills that once stood in this area; it is a two-story wood frame structure with a gable roof, set on the south side of the stream. A stone dam, partly patched with concrete, extends across the stream adjacent to the mill. A steel penstock, now disused, historically funneled water into the mill's wheelhouse, which was rebuilt in the mid-1980s. Below the mill building is a now-breached dam, and the foundational remnants of other mills. On the east side of Mills Road stands a two-story wooden bunkhouse, which is historically associated with the mill complex but is not part of the National Register listing.

The town of Whitefield was settled in the 1770s, and this area was from an early date used industrially. By the 1780s there were a dozen mills in the community, and a century later there were nineteen. This mill was established in 1897 by Henry W. Clary of Jefferson, and operated by him until after World War I. It continued as a sawmill under other owners until the mid-1980s, when the mill building was converted into an antique shop. Some of its original equipment remains, but some equipment was also brought into the building from the last phase of use. The building now stands vacant.

== See also ==
- National Register of Historic Places listings in Lincoln County, Maine
