= Nahanada Village Site =

- U.S. National Register of Historic Places
- Nearest city: Bristol, Maine
- Area: 0.5 acres (0.20 ha)
- NRHP reference No.: 80000240
- Added to NRHP: July 22, 1980

The Nahanada Village Site is an archaeological site near Pemaquid, Maine. It is believed to be the location of a Native American seasonal settlement which was visited by members of the 1607 Popham Colony, an early English attempt to settle on the Maine coast. The site was excavated by teams from the University of Maine at Orono in 1981 and 1982, finding a mixture of late prehistoric Native artifacts mixed with European trade goods of the period.

The site was listed on the National Register of Historic Places in 1980.

== See also ==
- National Register of Historic Places listings in Lincoln County, Maine
