= Glidden-Austin Block =

Historic building in Newcastle, Maine

- U.S. National Register of Historic Places
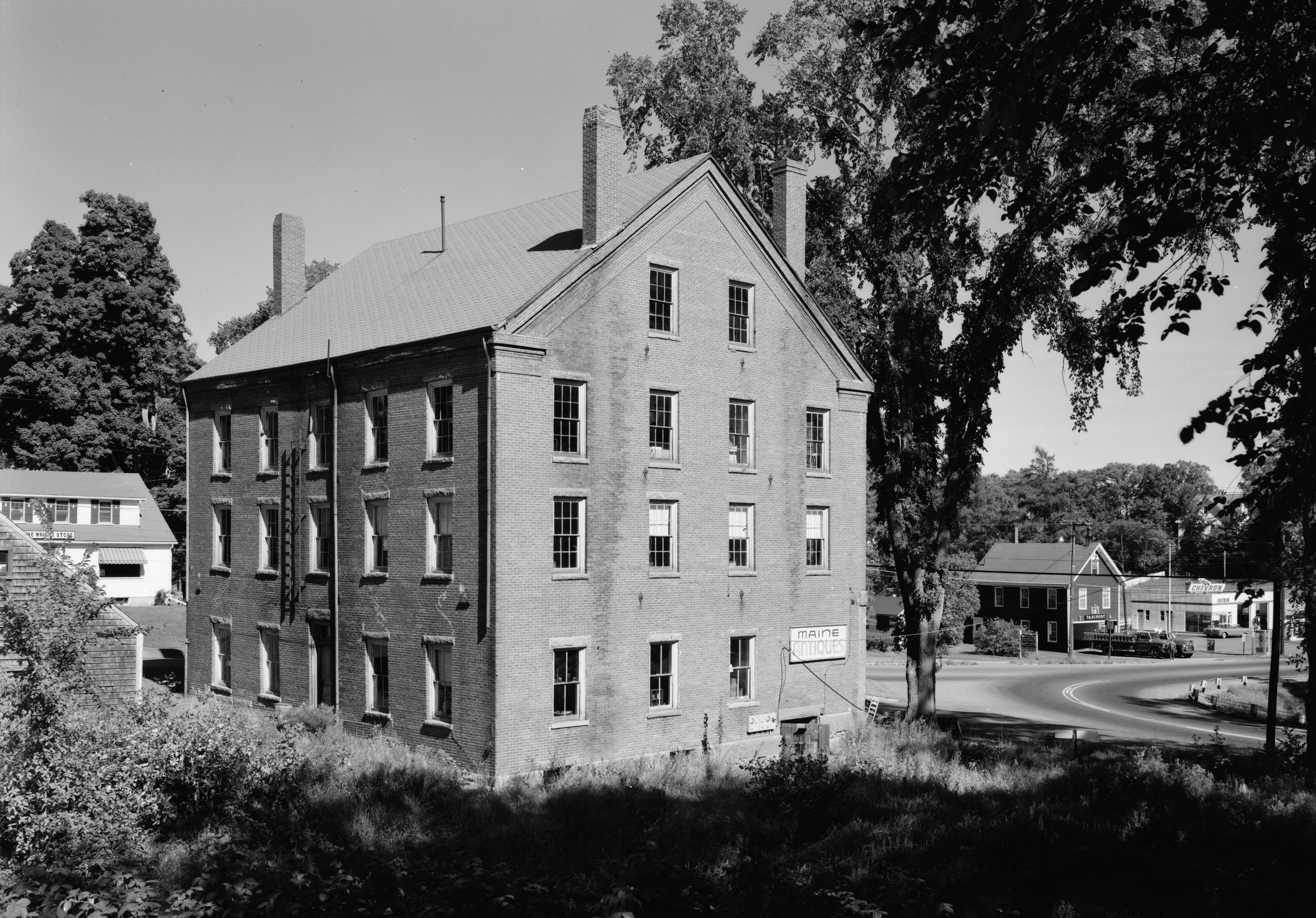
- 1960 HABS photo, rear/side view

- Location within Maine Location within the United States
- Location: 52 Main St., Newcastle, Maine
- Coordinates: 44°2′7″N 69°32′15″W
- Area: 1 acre (0.40 ha)
- Built: 1845
- NRHP reference No.: 75000102
- Added to NRHP: April 28, 1975

The Glidden-Austin Block is a historic commercial building at 52 Main Street in Newcastle, Maine. Built in 1845, it is a prominent local example of mid-19th century commercial architecture, occupying a prominent location in the community's downtown area. It was listed on the National Register of Historic Places on April 28, 1975.

== Description and history ==
The Glidden-Austin Block occupies a prominent location at the junction of Academy Hill Street and Main Street (Business United States Route 1) in the center of Newcastle. It is a 3 1/2-story brick building, with a gabled roof and granite foundation. The ground floor is seven bays wide, with two three-bay storefronts flanking a central building entrance. Each storefront consists of large fixed-pane display windows on either side of the store entrance, the elements divided and topped by rough granite lintels and posts. The second and third floors each have five windows, each with granite sills and lintels. Three gabled dormers project from the roof, and chimneys rise from the side walls.

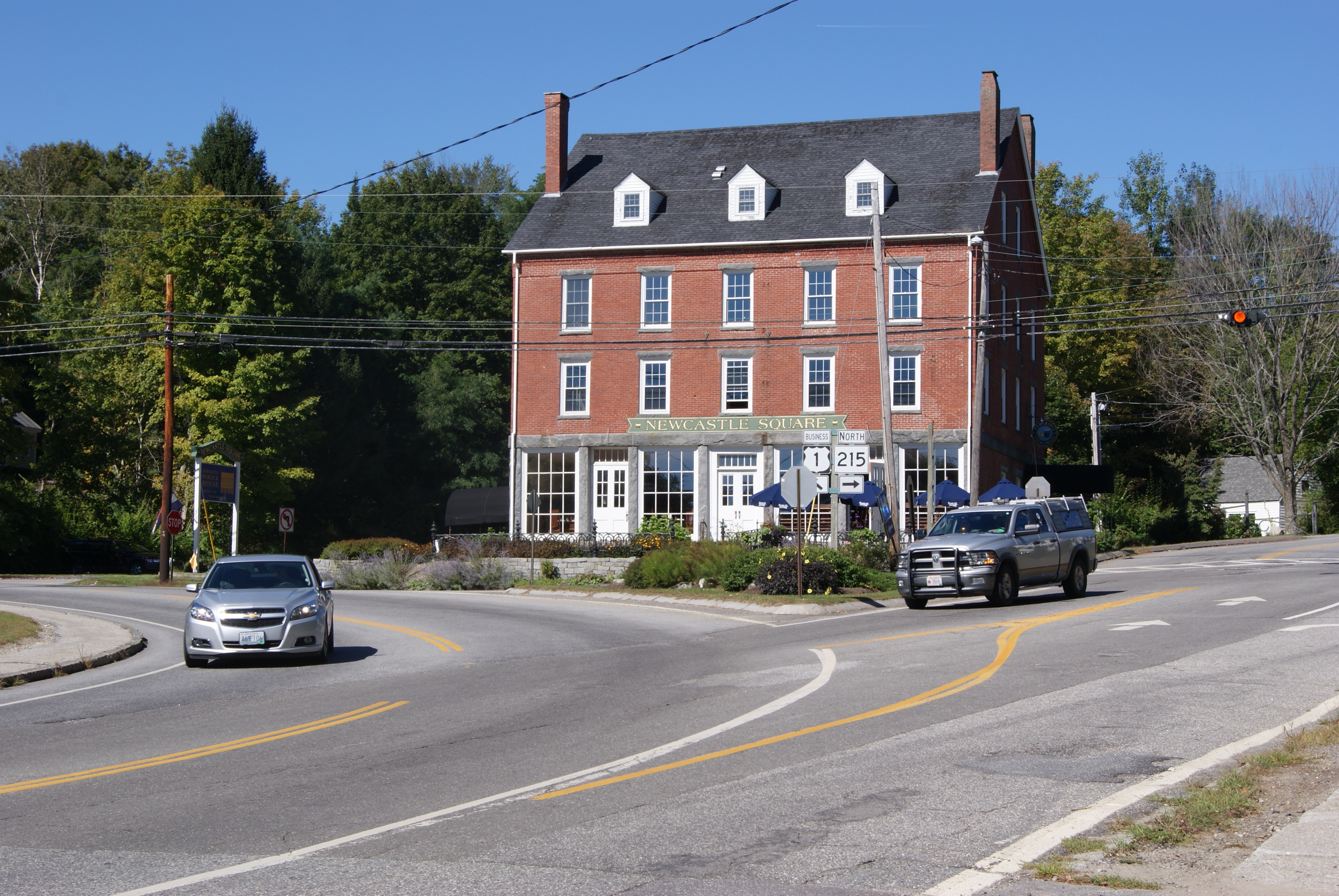
2013 photo

The block was built in 1845 by William Taylor Glidden, a prominent local ship's captain and merchant. Soon after building it, Glidden took on as a partner in the building Algernon S. Austin, a blacksmith who was involved in the locally prominent shipbuilding industry. The building probably originally housed a chandler's shop on the ground floor and residences above. It has seen a wide variety of uses, including as a garment factory, undertaker's shop, and tenement house. It presently houses the Newcastle Publick House, a restaurant and bar.

== See also ==
- National Register of Historic Places listings in Lincoln County, Maine
