= Union Church (Round Pond, Maine) =

Historic church in Maine, United States

- U.S. National Register of Historic Places
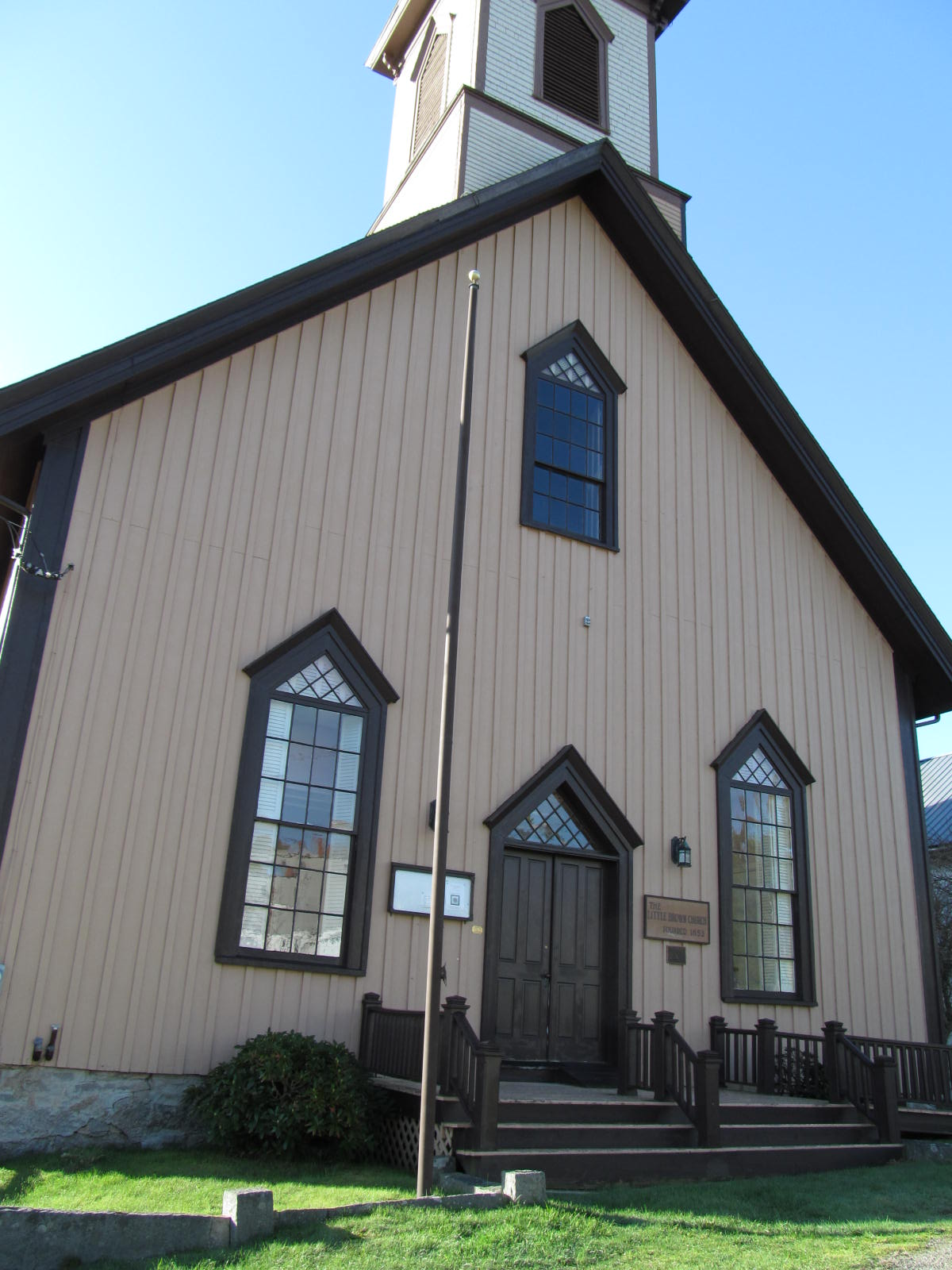

- Location within Maine Location within the United States
- Location: E. side ME 32, .05 miles S. of jct. with Back Shore Rd., Round Pond, Maine
- Coordinates: 43°56′49″N 69°27′40″W
- Area: less than one acre
- Built: 1853
- Architectural style: Gothic Revival
- NRHP reference No.: 98000723
- Added to NRHP: June 26, 1998

The Union Church, also known locally as the Little Brown Church, is a historic church on Maine State Route 32 in Round Pond, a village of Bristol, Maine. Built in 1853, it is a distinctive local example of Carpenter Gothic architecture, and one of the few of this type of church in the entire state. It was listed on the National Register of Historic Places in 1998.

== Description and history ==
The Union Church stands on the east side of SR 32 in the village of Round Pond, a short way south of its junction with Back Shore Road. It is a single-story wood frame structure, with a gabled roof, vertical board siding, and a granite foundation. The roof is topped by a two-stage square tower, whose upper stage houses a belfry with pointed-arch louvered openings. The tower is capped by a pyramidal roof with a finial at its peak. Windows are sash, set in pointed-arch openings with multi-light fixed windows in the arch, and a molded hood above. The main entrance, at the center of the west-facing front facade, is set in a similar opening. The building interior retains some original features, but much of it dates to a turn-of-the-20th-century renovation.

The church was built in 1853 for what was a mixed congregation, and was eventually also used by Baptist and Seventh-day Adventist congregations in the 19th century. It fell into disuse during the American Civil War, and was again revived as a non-denominational summer church in the 1870s. Although other Gothic Revival churches exist in the state, there are few that are built on a modest scale out of wood, and the others that survive in good condition were architect designed.

== See also ==
- National Register of Historic Places listings in Lincoln County, Maine
