= National Register of Historic Places listings in Lincoln County, Maine =

Location of Lincoln County in Maine

This is a list of the National Register of Historic Places listings in Lincoln County, Maine.

This is intended to be a complete list of the properties and districts on the National Register of Historic Places in Lincoln County, Maine, United States. Latitude and longitude coordinates are provided for many National Register properties and districts; these locations may be seen together in a map.

There are 107 properties and districts listed on the National Register in the county, including 3 National Historic Landmarks. An additional three properties were once listed on the register, but have since been delisted.

This National Park Service list is complete through NPS recent listings posted September 11, 2026.

Contents: Counties and municipalities in Maine
Androscoggin - Aroostook - Cumberland (City of Portland) - Franklin - Hancock - Kennebec - Knox - Lincoln - Oxford - Penobscot - Piscataquis - Sagadahoc - Somerset - Waldo - Washington - York

== Current listings ==
	Name on the Register	Image	Date listed	Location	City or town	Description
1	Alna Meetinghouse	Alna Meetinghouse	May 19, 1970 (#70000079)	State Route 218, Alna Center; 44°05′14″N 69°37′06″W	Alna	
2	Alna School	Alna School	April 28, 1975 (#75000101)	State Route 218, Alna Center; 44°04′56″N 69°37′08″W	Alna	
3	Arch Bridge	Arch Bridge	July 7, 2003 (#03000618)	Over the Pemaquid River on Benner Rd. 43°57′44″N 69°30′35″W	Bristol	
4	Archeological Site 16.8		June 29, 1984 (#84001433)	Address Restricted	Boothbay	
5	Archeological Site 16.20		June 29, 1984 (#84001456)	Address Restricted	Boothbay	
6	Archeological Site 16.21		June 29, 1984 (#84001452)	Address Restricted	Boothbay	
7	Archeological Site 16.37 Area I and II		June 29, 1984 (#84001428)	Address Restricted	Boothbay	
8	Archeological Site 16.38		June 29, 1984 (#84001448)	Address Restricted	Boothbay	
9	Archeological Site 16.47		June 29, 1984 (#84001445)	Address Restricted	Boothbay	
10	Archeological Site 16.68		June 29, 1984 (#84001436)	Address Restricted	Boothbay	
11	Archeological Site 16.73		May 29, 1984 (#84001431)	Address Restricted	Boothbay	
12	Archeological Site 26.27		June 29, 1984 (#84001430)	Address Restricted	Boothbay	
13	Archeological Site 16.175		June 29, 1984 (#84001462)	Address Restricted	Boothbay	
14	Archeological Site 16.198		June 29, 1984 (#84001460)	Address Restricted	Boothbay	
15	Auld-McCobb House	Auld-McCobb House	June 28, 1988 (#88000883)	Oak St. 43°51′08″N 69°37′42″W	Boothbay Harbor	
16	Averill-Philbrick House		January 2, 2025 (#100011224)	134 Golden Ridge Road; 44°04′23″N 69°36′41″W	Alna	
17	Boothbay Harbor Memorial Library	Boothbay Harbor Memorial Library	April 18, 1977 (#77000077)	State Route 27; 43°51′13″N 69°37′41″W	Boothbay Harbor	
18	Bowman-Carney House	Bowman-Carney House	April 7, 1971 (#71000071)	Bowman Ln., off State Route 128; 44°05′45″N 69°46′23″W	Dresden	
19	Bremen Town Hall, Former	Bremen Town Hall, Former	April 14, 2000 (#00000372)	State Route 32, 0.2 miles north of Medomak Rd. 44°00′47″N 69°25′18″W	Medomak	
20	Brick House Historic District	Brick House Historic District	February 13, 2009 (#09000013)	478 River Road; 44°00′19″N 69°33′27″W	Newcastle	Pre-20th century historic and archaeological listing of the Perkins Homestead.
21	Bridge Academy	Bridge Academy	January 9, 1987 (#86003540)	44 Middle Rd. 44°06′17″N 69°43′35″W	Dresden	Now houses the local public library.
22	Burnt Island Light Station	Burnt Island Light Station	November 23, 1977 (#77000139)	South of Boothbay Harbor on Burnt Island; 43°49′30″N 69°38′25″W	Boothbay Harbor	
23	Moses Carleton House	Moses Carleton House	July 18, 2002 (#02000783)	Hollywood Boulevard 0.2 miles northeast of its junction with State Route 94; 44°06′47″N 69°36′40″W	Alna	
24	Chapman-Hall House	Chapman-Hall House	May 19, 1970 (#70000077)	Main and Vine Sts. 44°01′57″N 69°31′47″W	Damariscotta	
25	Chimney Farm	Chimney Farm	February 7, 2007 (#07000012)	617 East Neck Rd. 44°06′57″N 69°28′31″W	Nobleboro	
26	Clary Mill	Clary Mill	December 2, 2004 (#04001283)	104 Mills Rd. 44°13′42″N 69°35′03″W	Whitefield	
27	Stephen Coffin House	Stephen Coffin House	April 15, 1987 (#86003519)	Main St. 44°01′57″N 69°31′53″W	Damariscotta	
28	Congregational Church of Edgecomb	Congregational Church of Edgecomb	June 12, 1987 (#87000923)	Cross Point Rd. 43°59′07″N 69°38′47″W	North Edgecomb	
29	CORA F. CRESSEY	CORA F. CRESSEY	April 18, 1990 (#90000586)	Keene Narrows; 43°59′04″N 69°24′54″W	Bremen	
30	Cottage on King's Row	Cottage on King's Row	January 12, 2016 (#15000970)	1400 ME 32; 43°56′42″N 69°27′46″W	Bristol	
31	Matthew Cottrill House	Matthew Cottrill House	May 2, 1974 (#74000177)	Main St. (U.S. Route 1); 44°01′50″N 69°32′06″W	Damariscotta	
32	Cuckolds Light Station	Cuckolds Light Station	December 2, 2002 (#02001413)	The Cuckolds; 43°46′46″N 69°39′03″W	Southport	
33	Damariscotta Baptist Church	Damariscotta Baptist Church	June 20, 1985 (#85001265)	King's Square; 44°01′53″N 69°31′47″W	Damariscotta	
34	Damariscotta Oyster Shell Heaps	Damariscotta Oyster Shell Heaps	December 30, 1969 (#69000027)	East and west banks of the Damariscotta River; 44°02′31″N 69°30′47″W	Damariscotta	Includes the Whaleback Shell Midden (now a state historic site) and the Glidden Shell Midden.
35	Damariscotta Shell Midden Historic District	Damariscotta Shell Midden Historic District	October 8, 1998 (#98001238)	Along the Damariscotta River; 44°02′34″N 69°30′54″W	Damariscotta	Includes 10 shell middens (including Whaleback and Glidden), and one non-midden prehistoric archaeological site.
36	Damariscove Island Archeological Site		May 22, 1978 (#78000186)	Damariscove Island; 43°45′55″N 69°36′45″W	Boothbay	Most of the island is archaeologically sensitive.
37	Damariscove Lifesaving Station		June 25, 1987 (#87000924)	Damariscove Island; 43°45′17″N 69°36′58″W	Boothbay	
38	Dodge Point Site		March 22, 1991 (#91000319)	Address Restricted	Newcastle	
39	Dresden Brick School House	Dresden Brick School House	June 13, 1986 (#86001273)	State Route 128; 44°05′07″N 69°46′26″W	Dresden	
40	Dresden Town House	Dresden Town House	October 12, 2000 (#00001204)	391 Middle Rd. 44°05′08″N 69°44′37″W	Dresden Mills	
41	Fisherman's Island		December 29, 2014 (#14001091)	Address Restricted; 43°47′54″N 69°36′11″W	Boothbay	
42	Fort Edgecomb	Fort Edgecomb	October 1, 1969 (#69000020)	On Davis Island in the Sheepscot River; 43°59′37″N 69°39′26″W	Edgecomb	Boundary increase December 22, 1991.
43	Fort William Henry	Fort William Henry	December 1, 1969 (#69000021)	Northwest of Pemaquid Beach; 43°52′39″N 69°31′29″W	Pemaquid Beach	
44	German Church and Cemetery	German Church and Cemetery	May 19, 1970 (#70000050)	1 mile south of Waldoboro Village on State Route 32; 44°05′24″N 69°23′19″W	Waldoboro	
45	Glidden-Austin Block	Glidden-Austin Block	April 28, 1975 (#75000102)	Junction of U.S. Route 1 and State Route 215; 44°02′07″N 69°32′15″W	Newcastle	
46	Old Gray House		May 8, 2007 (#07000408)	60 Tavenner Rd. 43°52′27″N 69°40′51″W	Boothbay	
47	Harrington Meetinghouse	Harrington Meetinghouse	May 19, 1970 (#70000051)	Northwest of Pemaquid on Old Harrington Rd. 43°54′53″N 69°31′43″W	Pemaquid	1772 meeting house originally stood in Bristol Mills, frame taken down and reerected, building moved to present location and altered into a reverse plan and then mostly restored in 1960-1970. One of three meeting houses built at the same time in Bristol.
48	Head Tide Historic District	Head Tide Historic District	November 19, 1974 (#74000320)	Both sides of the Sheepscot River; 44°06′53″N 69°37′28″W	Alna	
49	Hendricks Head Light Station	Hendricks Head Light Station	November 20, 1987 (#87002024)	Hendricks Head on Southport Island; 43°49′21″N 69°41′25″W	West Southport	
50	Anne Hilton Site		July 13, 1989 (#89000838)	Address Restricted	Newcastle	
51	Huston House	Huston House	February 8, 1985 (#85000241)	Bristol Rd. 44°01′04″N 69°31′49″W	Damariscotta	
52	Hutchins House	Hutchins House	February 19, 1982 (#82000769)	77 Main St. 44°05′46″N 69°22′26″W	Waldoboro	
53	The Influence	The Influence	December 29, 1983 (#83003655)	Main Street, Monhegan Island; 43°45′49″N 69°19′17″W	Monhegan	
54	Dr. F.W. Jackson House	Dr. F.W. Jackson House	November 10, 1980 (#80000236)	State Route 32; 44°12′09″N 69°27′50″W	Jefferson	
55	Jefferson Cattle Pound	Jefferson Cattle Pound	July 28, 2004 (#04000742)	0.75 miles west of the junction of Gardiner Rd. and State Route 213; 44°12′01″N 69°29′48″W	Jefferson	
56	Jefferson Town House	Jefferson Town House	July 12, 1999 (#99000771)	Junction of State Routes 126 and 213; 44°12′02″N 69°29′06″W	Jefferson	
57	Gov. Edward Kavanaugh House	Gov. Edward Kavanaugh House	May 3, 1974 (#74000178)	State Route 215 (Damariscotta Mills); 44°03′39″N 69°31′51″W	Newcastle	
58	Rockwell Kent Cottage and Studio		April 8, 1992 (#92000278)	Off the northern side of Horn Hill Rd. on Monhegan Island; 43°45′47″N 69°19′08″W	Monhegan	
59	Knight-Corey House	Knight-Corey House	March 13, 1980 (#80000237)	Corey Lane; 43°52′35″N 69°38′09″W	Boothbay	
60	Lithgow House	Lithgow House	December 26, 1985 (#85003156)	Blinn Hill Rd. 44°06′36″N 69°43′05″W	Dresden	
61	Loudville Church	Loudville Church	December 14, 1995 (#95001457)	Center of Louds Island; 43°55′49″N 69°26′07″W	Loudville	
62	Godfrey Ludwig House	Godfrey Ludwig House	September 22, 1980 (#80000238)	State Route 32; 44°09′33″N 69°25′00″W	Waldoboro	
63	Main Street Historic District	Main Street Historic District	August 10, 1979 (#79000154)	Main St.; also 170-270 Main St. and 4-5 Bristol Rd. 44°01′58″N 69°31′56″W	Damariscotta	Second set of addresses represents a boundary increase
64	Manana Island Fog Signal Station	Manana Island Fog Signal Station	December 2, 2002 (#02001412)	Manana Island; 43°45′54″N 69°19′37″W	Monhegan	
65	Mariners Lodge No. 53, IOOF	Mariners Lodge No. 53, IOOF	September 11, 2026 (#100013373)	1415 State Route 32; 43°56′47″N 69°27′44″W	Bristol	
66	Emily Means House	Emily Means House	February 8, 1985 (#85000242)	Birch Island; 43°50′58″N 69°32′57″W	South Bristol	
67	Monhegan Island Lighthouse and Quarters	Monhegan Island Lighthouse and Quarters	May 7, 1980 (#80000239)	Monhegan Island; 43°45′54″N 69°19′00″W	Monhegan	
68	John Moore House	John Moore House	July 10, 1979 (#79000155)	Southwest of Edgecomb on Cross Point Rd. 43°58′35″N 69°38′55″W	Edgecomb	
69	Nahanada Village Site		July 22, 1980 (#80000240)	Address Restricted	Bristol	
70	Nickels-Sortwell House	Nickels-Sortwell House	December 30, 1970 (#70000078)	Northeastern corner of Main and Federal Sts. 44°00′15″N 69°40′03″W	Wiscasset	
71	Parson's Bend	Parson's Bend	December 21, 2005 (#05001439)	100 Nelson Rd. 44°05′55″N 69°36′00″W	Alna	
72	Josiah K. Parsons Homestead		February 4, 1982 (#82000770)	Greenleaf Cove Rd. 43°55′12″N 69°41′35″W	Westport	Listed as being in the Wiscasset vicinity
73	Stephen Parsons House	Stephen Parsons House	October 6, 1983 (#83003648)	Southwest of Edgecomb on Parsons Creek; 43°56′55″N 69°38′38″W	Edgecomb	
74	Pemaquid Point Light	Pemaquid Point Light	April 16, 1985 (#85000843)	Pemaquid Point; 43°50′13″N 69°30′23″W	Bristol	
75	Pemaquid Restoration and Museum	Pemaquid Restoration and Museum	December 2, 1969 (#69000022)	North of Pemaquid Beach at Pemaquid Point; 43°52′41″N 69°31′17″W	Pemaquid Beach	
76	Perkins Homestead	Perkins Homestead	August 25, 2014 (#14000919)	478 River Rd. 44°00′19″N 69°33′27″W	Newcastle	Homestead associated with Frances Perkins, the first female United States Cabinet member; also listed as the "Brick House Historic District" for earlier significance.
77	Pownalborough Courthouse	Pownalborough Courthouse	January 12, 1970 (#70000052)	Cedar Grove Rd. 44°06′19″N 69°45′59″W	Dresden	
78	Pythian Opera House	Pythian Opera House	December 30, 2008 (#08001256)	86 Townsend Ave. 43°51′16″N 69°37′35″W	Boothbay Harbor	
79	Ram Island Light Station	Ram Island Light Station	January 21, 1988 (#87002280)	Ram Island, Boothbay Harbor; 43°48′14″N 69°36′00″W	Boothbay Harbor	
80	Red Brick School	Red Brick School	October 6, 1970 (#70000089)	Warren St. 44°00′19″N 69°40′00″W	Wiscasset	
81	Capt. George Scott House	Capt. George Scott House	February 23, 1972 (#72000104)	Federal St. 44°00′26″N 69°39′49″W	Wiscasset	
82	Second Congregational Church	Second Congregational Church	May 7, 1979 (#79000156)	River St. 44°02′04″N 69°32′15″W	Newcastle	
83	Sheepscot Historic District	Sheepscot Historic District	June 23, 1978 (#78000424)	Sheepscot Rd. and Kings Hwy. 44°03′00″N 69°36′35″W	Newcastle and Alna	
84	Sproul Homestead	Sproul Homestead	March 21, 1978 (#78000188)	North of South Bristol on State Route 129; 43°54′30″N 69°33′11″W	South Bristol	
85	Sprucewold Lodge	Sprucewold Lodge	October 8, 2014 (#14000837)	4-9 Nahanada Road; 43°50′27″N 69°37′12″W	Boothbay Harbor	
86	Squire Tarbox House		April 11, 1985 (#85000725)	State Route 144; 43°54′05″N 69°42′30″W	Westport	
87	St. Andrew's Church	St. Andrew's Church	October 8, 1976 (#76000101)	Glidden St. 44°02′03″N 69°32′04″W	Newcastle	
88	St. Denis Catholic Church	St. Denis Catholic Church	October 29, 1976 (#76000102)	298 State Route 126; 44°13′43″N 69°36′52″W	North Whitefield	
89	St. John's Anglican Church and Parsonage Site	St. John's Anglican Church and Parsonage Site	November 21, 1978 (#78000187)	Address Restricted	Dresden	
90	St. John's Episcopal Church	St. John's Episcopal Church	June 14, 1991 (#91000769)	Southern side of State Route 27 at its junction with Blinn Hill Rd. 44°06′24″N 69°43′25″W	Dresden Mills	
91	St. Patrick's Catholic Church	St. Patrick's Catholic Church	April 23, 1973 (#73000133)	Academy Rd. 44°03′25″N 69°32′07″W	Newcastle	
92	Taylor Site 16.65		June 29, 1984 (#84001441)	Address Restricted	Boothbay	
93	Thompson Icehouse	Thompson Icehouse	December 31, 1974 (#74000179)	State Route 129; 43°52′44″N 69°33′38″W	South Bristol	
94	U.S. Customhouse (Old Customhouse) and Post Office	U.S. Customhouse (Old Customhouse) and Post Office	August 25, 1970 (#70000053)	Water St. 44°00′03″N 69°39′58″W	Wiscasset	
95	U.S. Customhouse and Post Office	U.S. Customhouse and Post Office	January 18, 1974 (#74000180)	Main St. 44°05′44″N 69°22′33″W	Waldoboro	
96	Union Church	Union Church	June 26, 1998 (#98000723)	Eastern side of State Route 32, 0.05 miles south of its junction with Back Shore Rd. 43°56′49″N 69°27′40″W	Round Pond	
97	Union Meeting House, (Former)		July 15, 2002 (#02000786)	Main Rd., State Route 144; 43°53′55″N 69°42′34″W	Westport	
98	Village School at Puddle Dock	Village School at Puddle Dock	June 28, 2024 (#100010456)	275 Head Tide Road / ME 194; 44°06′23″N 69°36′16″W	Alna	
99	Waldo Theatre	Waldo Theatre	September 11, 1986 (#86002434)	Main St. 44°05′45″N 69°22′30″W	Waldoboro	
100	Waldoborough Town Pound	Waldoborough Town Pound	May 28, 1976 (#76000103)	Main St. 44°06′05″N 69°22′12″W	Waldoboro	
101	Walpole Meetinghouse	Walpole Meetinghouse	November 7, 1976 (#76000104)	North of Walpole on Meeting House Rd. 43°59′09″N 69°32′28″W	Walpole	
102	Daniel Weston Homestead	Daniel Weston Homestead	October 1, 1979 (#79000157)	West of Medomak on State Route 32; 44°00′06″N 69°25′43″W	Medomak	
103	Westport Community Church		July 15, 2002 (#02000784)	Main Rd., State Route 144; 43°53′57″N 69°42′34″W	Westport	
104	Wetherill Site		December 17, 1992 (#92001709)	Address Restricted	Waldoboro	
105	Whitefield Union Hall	Whitefield Union Hall	February 7, 2007 (#07000014)	901 Townhouse Rd. 44°10′15″N 69°37′41″W	Whitefield	
106	Wiscasset Historic District	Wiscasset Historic District	January 12, 1973 (#73000242)	Roughly Parker, Dresden, Bradford, Main, and Federal Sts. 44°00′20″N 69°40′04″W	Wiscasset	
107	Wiscasset Jail and Museum	Wiscasset Jail and Museum	January 26, 1970 (#70000054)	State Route 218; 44°00′38″N 69°39′44″W	Wiscasset	

== Former listings ==
	Name on the Register	Image	Date listed	Date removed	Location	City or town	Description
1	HESPER and LUTHER LITTLE		April 18, 1990 (#90000589)	April 29, 2004	Wiscasset waterfront off Water Street	Wiscasset	Both ships have been grounded since the 1930s. Demolished in 1998.
2	Col. Isaac G. Reed House		August 5, 2005 (#100001676)	October 5, 2017	60 Glidden St. 44°05′49″N 69°22′38″W	Waldoboro	Destroyed by fire April 2, 2017.
3	Ada Smith Homestead		August 11, 1983 (#83000465)	January 15, 2004	ME 218	Alna	Destroyed by fire on December 27, 2000.

== See also ==
- List of National Historic Landmarks in Maine
- National Register of Historic Places listings in Maine
