= Cottage on King's Row =

Historic house in Maine, United States

- U.S. National Register of Historic Places
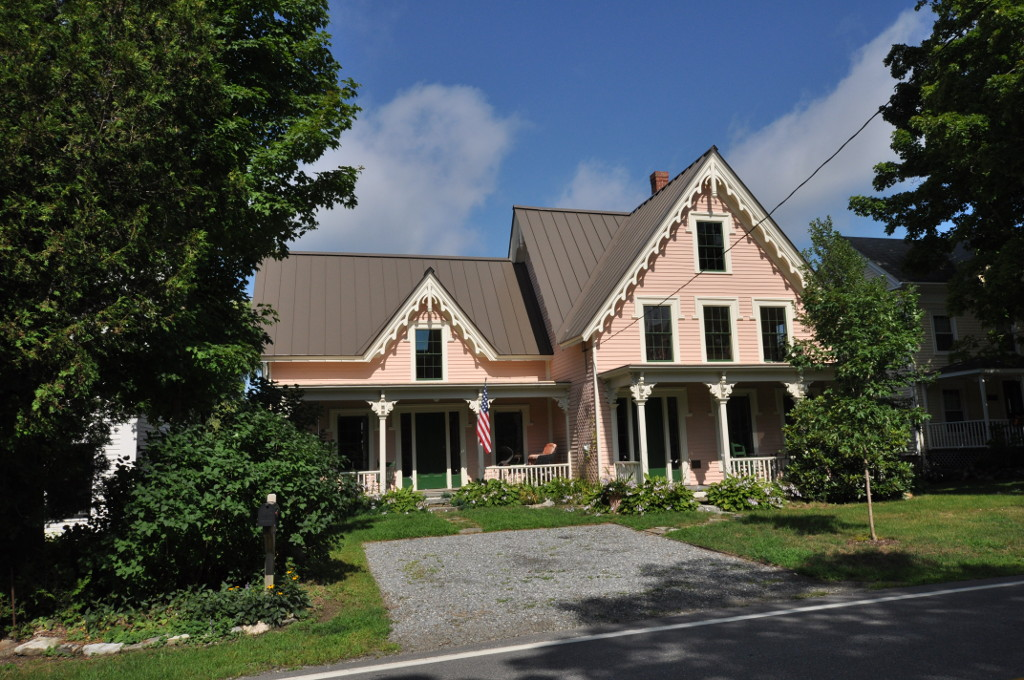

- Location within Maine Location within the United States
- Location: 1400 SR 32, Bristol, Maine
- Coordinates: 43°56′42″N 69°27′46″W
- Area: less than one acre
- Built: 1853
- Architectural style: Gothic Revival
- NRHP reference No.: 15000970
- Added to NRHP: January 12, 2016

The Cottage on King's Row is a historic house at 1400 Main Street (Maine State Route 32) in Bristol, Maine. Built c. 1853–54, it is a high-quality and well-preserved example of Gothic Revival architecture, based on the designs of Andrew Jackson Downing. The house was listed on the National Register of Historic Places in 2016.

== Description and history ==
The Cottage on King's Row stands on the west side of SR 32 in the Round Pond village of Bristol. It is a 1 1/2-story L-shaped wood-frame structure, with a cross-gabled main block and a gabled ell extending to the left with a smaller cross-gable. Both front-facing gables are treated with elaborately carved vergeboard, and the windows are framed by molded hoods with ears. Single-story porches extend across both sections, also featuring elaborate carved and turned woodwork. The interior retains many original finishes, including pine floors, plaster, and wooden trim elements.

The house is one of several Gothic cottages built in Round Pond in the 1850s. Three others were built in the immediate vicinity of this one, which retains more of its historical features than the other two that survive. The builders of three of them, including this one, were brothers in the Yates family, which had been present in Round Pond since 1742. This house appears to have been built about 1853 or 1854 for Alexander Yates by Edward Rowley. The architectural structure and detailing of the house are consistent with the principles laid down by designer Andrew Jackson Downing in his Cottage Residences (1842) and The Architecture of Country Houses (1850), suggesting that the builder was familiar with at least one of these works.

== See also ==
- National Register of Historic Places listings in Lincoln County, Maine
