= St. Denis Catholic Church =

Historic church in Maine, United States

- U.S. National Register of Historic Places
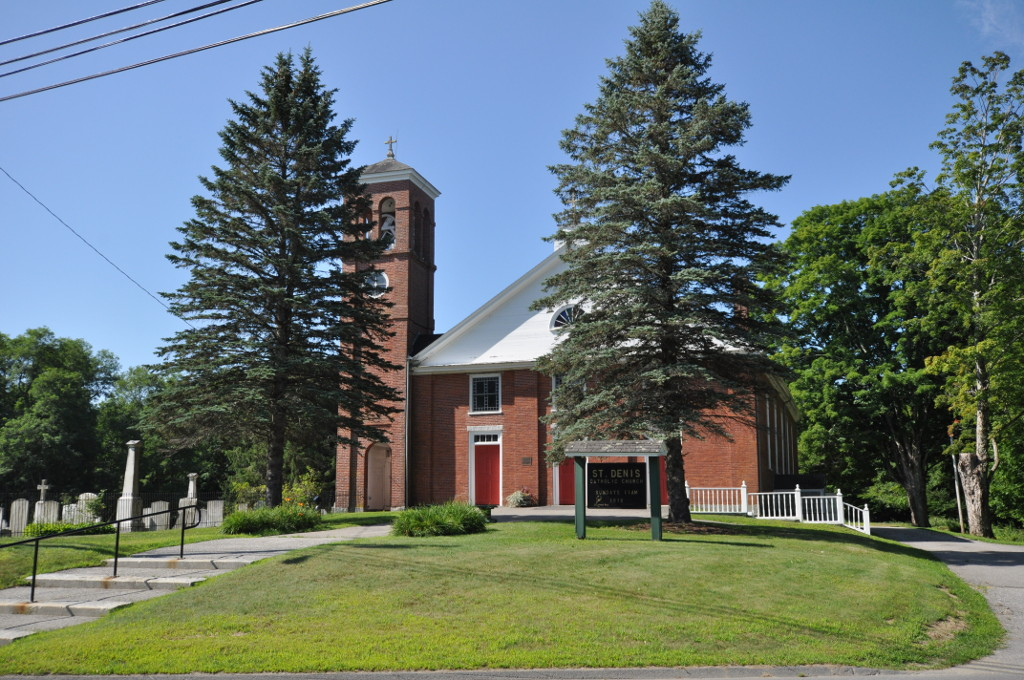

- Location within Maine Location within the United States
- Location: 298 SR 126, North Whitefield, Maine
- Coordinates: 44°13′43″N 69°36′52″W
- Area: 2 acres (0.81 ha)
- Built: 1838
- Architectural style: Greek Revival
- NRHP reference No.: 76000102
- Added to NRHP: October 29, 1976

St. Denis Catholic Church is a historic Roman Catholic church at 298 Grand Army Road (Maine State Route 126) in North Whitefield, Maine. Built 1833–38, it is the third oldest Catholic church in New England. It was listed on the National Register of Historic Places in 1976. It remains in use as an active community of the Parish of St. Michael in the Diocese of Portland.

== Description and history ==
The St. Denis Church complex stands in a rural setting, at a bend in SR 126 west of North Whitefield, just east of its junction with Cooper Road. The complex includes two buildings, both of brick: the church itself, located on the south side of the road, and the parish hall, on the north side. The church is a single-story structure, with a gabled roof and a square tower attached to the left side. The front facade is three bays wide, articulated by pilasters, with entrances set below square gallery-level windows. The tower is built in the Italian campanile style, with corner pilasters rises to clock stage and then an open belfry with paired round-arch openings on each side. It is topped by a flat roof. The church interior is decorated in an early version of the Gothic Revival.

The parish was established in 1818 as "St. Dennis" parish, and originally met in a wood-frame structure built on this site. Between 1833 and 1838, the main portion of the present brick building was built around that building. The parish was renamed with a single "n" in 1850. The tower was added in 1861, and the stained glass windows also date from later in the 19th century. The parish hall was built in 1871. The church underwent a major restoration in 1997.

On July 1, 2007, the parish of St. Denis was canonically merged with St. Mary of the Assumption in Augusta, St. Augustine in Augusta, St. Andrew in Augusta, and St. Joseph in Gardiner to form St. Michael Catholic Parish, serving all of central Maine.

== See also ==
- National Register of Historic Places listings in Lincoln County, Maine
