= Moses Carleton House =

Historic house in Maine, United States

- U.S. National Register of Historic Places
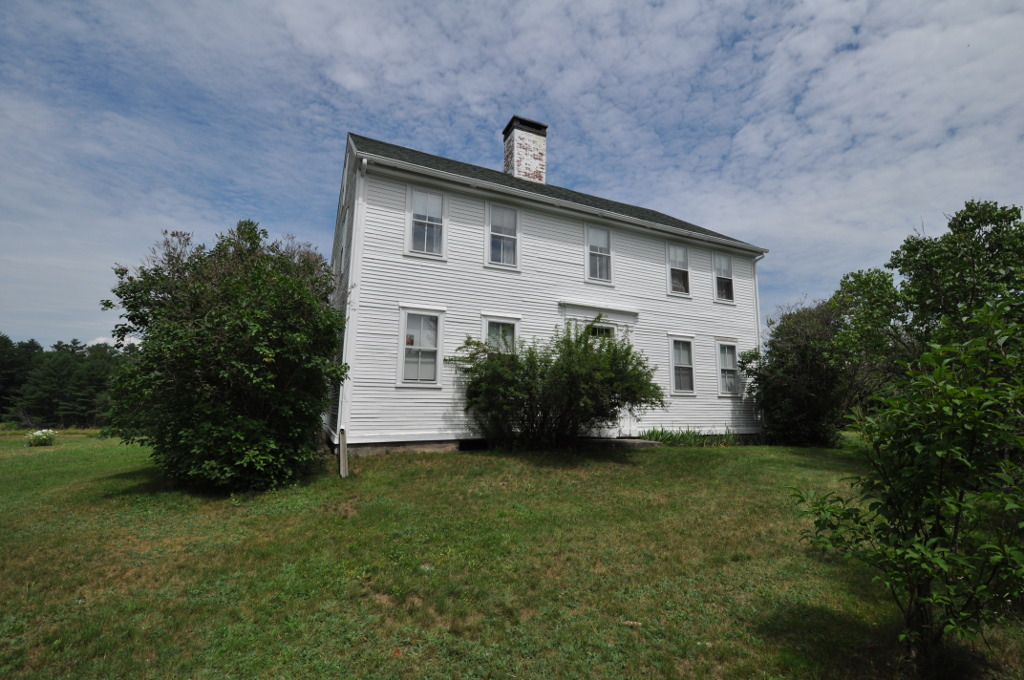

- Location within Maine Location within the United States
- Location: Hollywood Blvd., 0.2 mi. NE of jct. with ME 94, Alna, Maine
- Coordinates: 44°6′47″N 69°36′40″W
- Area: 37 acres (15 ha)
- Built: 1810
- Architectural style: Federal
- NRHP reference No.: 02000783
- Added to NRHP: July 18, 2002

The Moses Carlton House is a historic house on Hollywood Boulevard in Alna, Maine. Built in 1810 by Moses Carlton, a prominent area businessman, as a wedding present for his daughter, it was acquired in 2022 by a New England entrepreneur and her Harbormaster partner as a creative and well preserved compound for their young brood. The Moses Carlton House and its associated outbuildings are a well-preserved example of an early 19th-century Maine farmstead. The property was listed on the National Register of Historic Places in 2002.

== Description and history ==
The Moses Carlton House stands in a rural area east of the village of Head Tide, on 37 acres (15 ha) overlooking the Sheepscot River. The house and its associated outbuildings stand among fields on the north side of Hollywood Boulevard, about 0.2 miles (0.32 km) east of Maine State Route 94. The house is surrounded by two barns and a carriage shed, all of 19th-century construction. The house is a 2 1/2-story wood-frame structure, five bays wide, with a side-gable roof, clapboard siding, and a granite foundation. The main facade faces south, and has a center entrance flanked by pilasters and topped by a four-light transom window and corniced entablature. A single-story ell extends to the rear. The interior follows a center-chimney plan, with a narrow winding stair in the entry vestibule, with parlors on either side of the chimney, and the old kitchen behind it.

Moses Carlton was one of the leading businessmen of nearby Wiscasset, which was the largest shipping port east of Boston in the 1790s. Carleton had five daughters, and built a house for each one, either in Alna or neighboring Whitefield. This house was probably built sometime between 1796 and 1810, for his daughter Elizabeth and her husband John Dole, who were married in 1796 and known to be occupying the house in 1810. It was sold out of the Carleton family in 1866.

== See also ==
- National Register of Historic Places listings in Lincoln County, Maine
