= Josiah K. Parsons Homestead =

Historic house in Maine, United States

- U.S. National Register of Historic Places
- Location within Maine Location within the United States
- Location: Greenleaf Cove (Bakers) Rd., Westport, Maine
- Coordinates: 43°55′12″N 69°41′35″W
- Area: 7 acres (2.8 ha)
- Built: 1792
- Built by: Parsons, Capt. Josiah K.
- Architectural style: Federal
- NRHP reference No.: 82000770
- Added to NRHP: February 4, 1982

The Josiah K. Parsons Homestead is a historic house overlooking Greenleaf Cove in Westport, Maine. Built in 1792 by a veteran of the American Revolutionary War, it is a well-preserved example of early Federal period architecture. The property also includes an early 19th-century trading post with original fixtures, and was used in the 20th century for pioneering research in the neurophysiology and communications capabilities of dolphins by John C. Lilly. It was listed on the National Register of Historic Places in 1982.

== Description and history ==
The Parsons Homestead stands on the east side of the rural island community of Westport, overlooking Greenleaf Cove; it is located at the end of Baker Road, off Main Road (Maine State Route 144). The house is a 2 1/2-story wood-frame structure, with a single-story ell extending to the rear. The main block faces east, and has a symmetrical five-bay front, with a center entrance flanked by pilasters and topped by an entablature and cornice. The roof is gabled, and the walls are clapboarded. Located close to the water is a single-story wood-frame Cape style structure, which served as a trading post in the 19th century; its interior retains original store furnishings. Close to the trading post is the former site of a dolphin pool, which was an oval concrete structure measuring 50 by 75 feet (15 m × 23 m).

The house was built in 1792 by Josiah Parsons, a York native and veteran of the American Revolutionary War. Parsons was one of the town's largest landowners, and his trading post was for many years the only retail establishment on the island. The property was purchased in 1964 by scientist John C. Lilly, who constructed the dolphin pool (since removed), and performed some of his groundbreaking research on human and dolphin hearing here.

== See also ==
- National Register of Historic Places listings in Lincoln County, Maine
