= Dr. F.W. Jackson House =

Historic house in Maine, United States

- Dr. F. W. Jackson House
- U.S. National Register of Historic Places
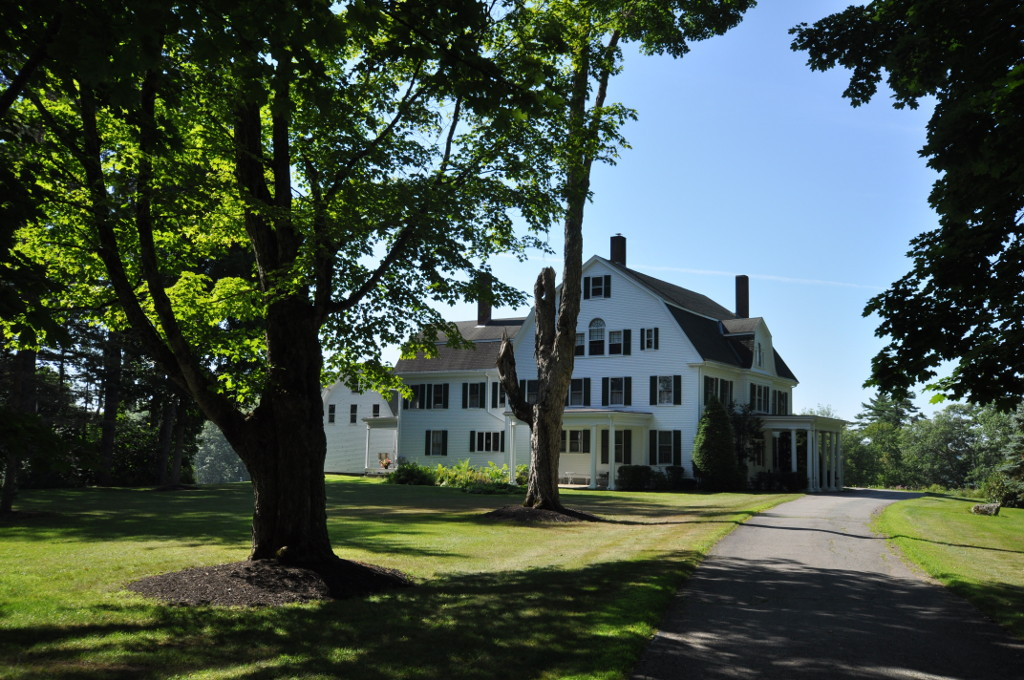

- Location within Maine Location within the United States
- Location: ME 32, Jefferson, Maine
- Coordinates: 44°12′9″N 69°27′50″W
- Area: 1 acre (0.40 ha)
- Built: 1903
- Architect: Patch, Samuel
- Architectural style: Colonial Revival
- NRHP reference No.: 80000236
- Added to NRHP: November 10, 1980

The Dr. F.W. Jackson House is a historic house on Maine State Route 32 in the village center of Jefferson, Maine. Built 1903–05, it is one of the rural community's largest and most elegant examples of Colonial Revival architecture. It was listed on the National Register of Historic Places in 1980.

== Description and history ==
The Jackson House stands on the south side of Waldoboro Road (SR 32), just south of its junction with Maine State Route 126, in the village center of Jefferson. The property has shoreline on Damariscotta Lake to the south. It is a 3 1/2-story wood-frame structure, with a gambrel roof and clapboard siding. It is oriented with its main facade facing west, with a 2 1/2-story gambreled ell extending to the east. The main facade is symmetrical, with five bays. The central bay is in a projecting element that has a gambrel dormer with a Palladian window, and a band of three sash windows above the main entrance. The entrance is sheltered by a projecting flat-roof portico, supported by groups of smooth Doric columns. A similar portico adorns the north side of the house, and the side elevations have Palladian windows in the third level.

The house was built in 1903–05 for Dr. Fred W. Jackson, a Jefferson native who met with business and professional success in Providence, Rhode Island, and married into a wealthy family. The house was designed by Samuel Patch of Waltham, Massachusetts, and is the largest and most architecturally sophisticated residence in the rural community. The overall effect of the house and its landscaping is that of a sprawling English country house.

== See also ==
- National Register of Historic Places listings in Lincoln County, Maine
