= Daniel Weston Homestead =

Historic house in Maine, United States

- U.S. National Register of Historic Places
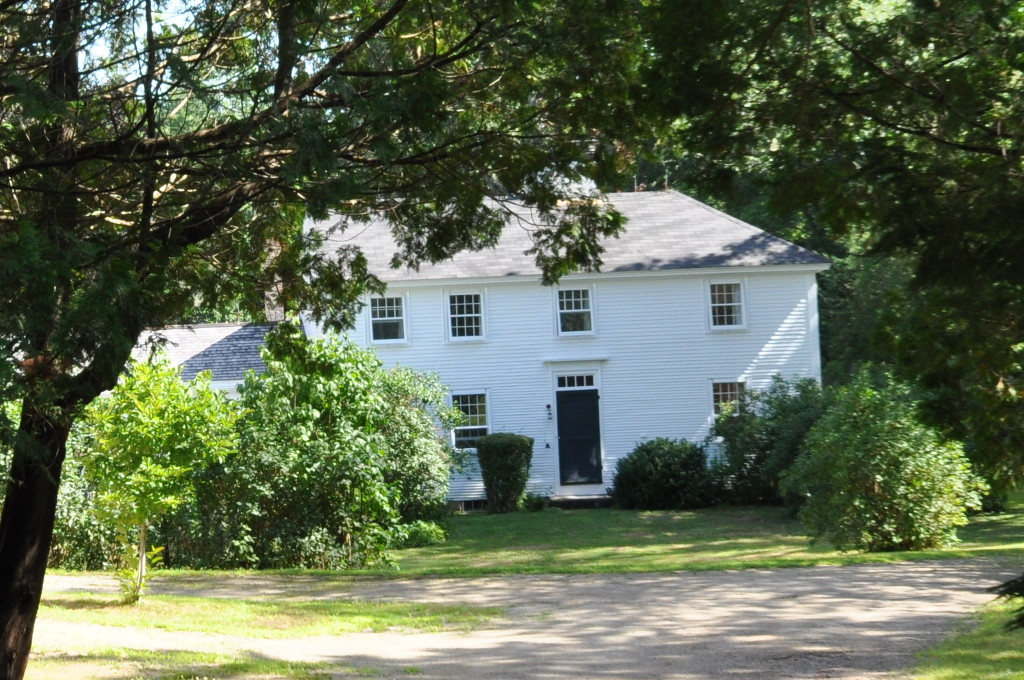

- Location within Maine Location within the United States
- Location: SR 32 at Shore Rd., Bremen, Maine
- Coordinates: 44°0′6″N 69°25′43″W
- Area: 1 acre (0.40 ha)
- Built: 1806
- Built by: Weston, Daniel
- Architectural style: Federal
- NRHP reference No.: 79000157
- Added to NRHP: October 1, 1979

The Daniel Weston Homestead is a historic house on Maine State Route 32 in Bremen, Maine. Built about 1806 by a son of one of the area's first colonial settlers, it is a well-preserved local example of Federal period architecture. It was listed on the National Register of Historic Places in 1979.

== Description and history ==
The Daniel Weston Homestead stands at a bend in the road of SR 32, on the north side of the road opposite its junction with Shore Road. It is a 2 1/2-story wood-frame structure, with a gabled roof, central chimney, clapboarded exterior, and fieldstone foundation. The main portion is L-shaped, with a shed and barn extending west and then south. The original main entrance is on the five-bay east facade, with a vertical-board door framed by sidelight windows and pilasters, and topped by an entablature with dentillated cornice. The south-facing secondary entrance is more modest, with a four-light transom topped by an entablature and simple cornice. The interior retains many original period finishes, including floors, paneling, wainscoting, and fireplace surrounds.

The house was built about 1806 by Daniel Weston, whose father and uncle were among the first settlers of the Bremen area, arriving in 1772. Weston was, like his father, a shipbuilder, and the construction of this house exhibits some features peculiar to that specialized craft. Much of the woodwork is slightly curvilinear, and in the upper story, the ceilings have been curved inward to achieve greater height than is typically found in period houses.

== See also ==
- National Register of Historic Places listings in Lincoln County, Maine
