= Parson's Bend =

Historic house in Maine, United States

- U.S. National Register of Historic Places
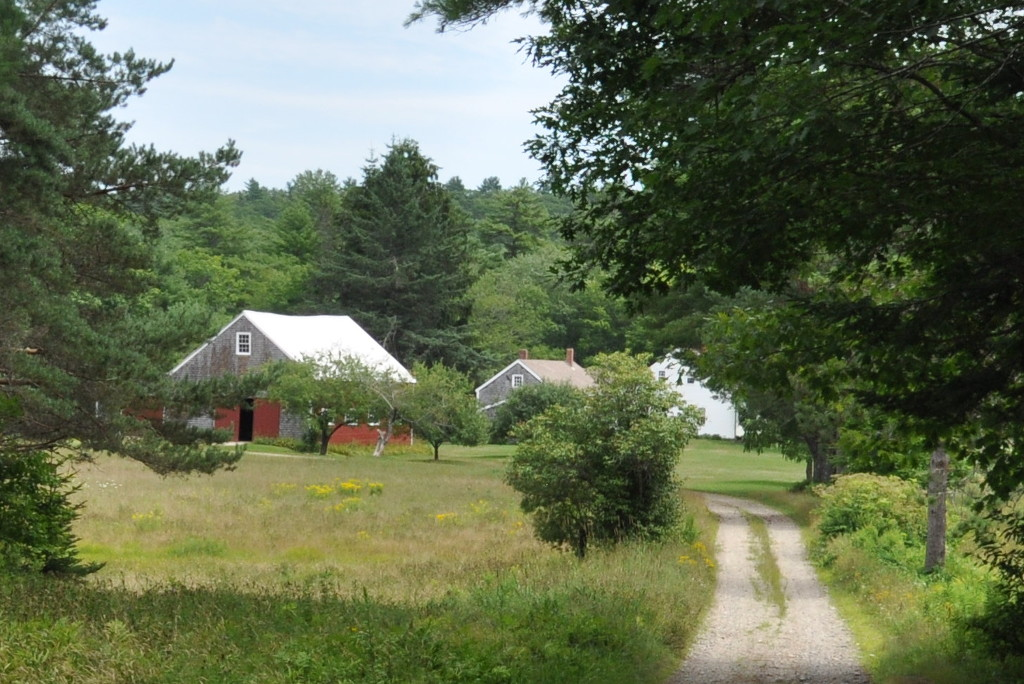

- Location within Maine Location within the United States
- Location: 100 Nelson Rd., Alna, Maine
- Coordinates: 44°5′58″N 69°35′57″W
- Area: 39 acres (16 ha)
- Built: 1800
- Built by: Jacob Nelson
- Architectural style: Federal, Georgian
- NRHP reference No.: 05001439
- Added to NRHP: December 21, 2005

Parson's Bend is a historic farm property on Nelson Street in Alna, Maine. Built about 1800, the farmhouse is a well-preserved and idiosyncratic Georgian-Federal style Cape house. It was listed on the National Register of Historic Places in 2005.

== Description and history ==
Parson's Bend is a farm property of 39 acres (16 ha) that occupies the inside of a bend in the Sheepscot River a short way south of the main village in the rural community of Alna. The river flows southeast and then makes a ninety-degree bend to the southwest. The farm property is bounded on the southwest side by Nelson Road, a narrow dirt lane. The farm complex is located on the northern side of the cleared portion of the property, and includes the main house, a guest house, and a barn. The main house is a 1 1/2-story wood-frame structure, with single-story ells extending to one side. The main block has a gabled roof, central chimney, clapboard siding, and a fieldstone foundation. The front is five bays wide, with a center entrance and windows that have essentially vernacular trim. The interior follows a fairly typical center-chimney plan, with a narrow vestibule in front, parlors to either side of the chimney, and a long kitchen behind with small rooms at the corners. The stairs from the vestibule to the attic are particularly unusual, rising steeply and skirting around the mass of the chimney, which shrinks in cross-section as it rises. Original woodwork and flooring are found throughout.

Land in this area was purchased in the 1760s by David Nelson, who dammed the Sheepscot River and established mills at the Head of Tide village upriver. Nelson moved to Boothbay in 1782, and this land was later taken over by his nephew Jacob, who built the farmhouse c. 1800. At one time, town records note the presence of four Nelson family farms in the area, of which this one is the last to survive. The property was purchased by Henry and Woodbury Parsons, for whom the property is now named. The Cape-style farmhouse is one of the best-preserved of Alna's surviving pre-1825 buildings.

== See also ==
- National Register of Historic Places listings in Lincoln County, Maine
