= The Influence (Monhegan, Maine) =

Historic house in Maine, United States

- U.S. National Register of Historic Places
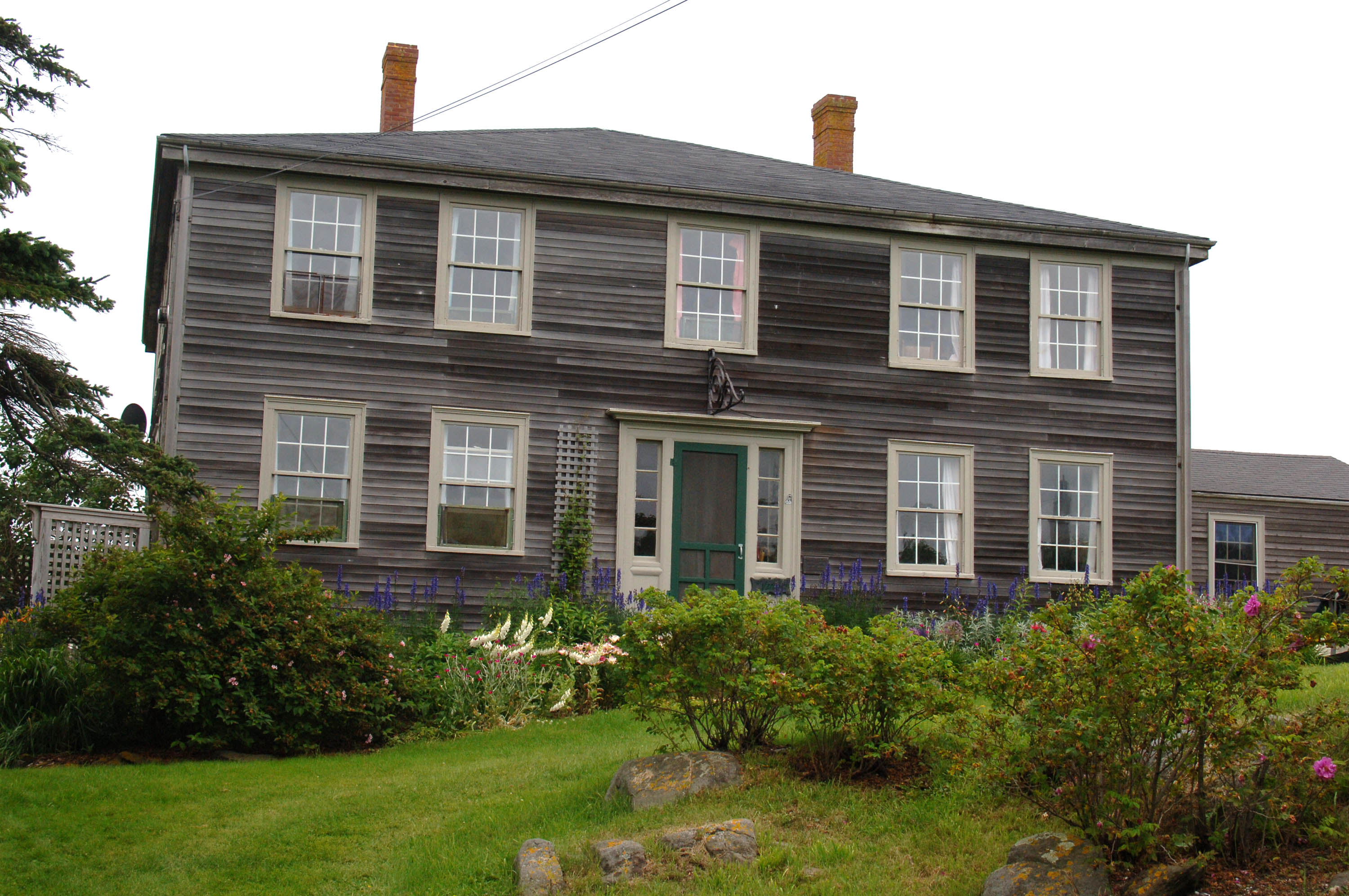

- Location within Maine Location within the United States
- Location: Main St., Monhegan, Maine
- Coordinates: 43°45′49″N 69°19′17″W
- Area: 0.5 acres (0.20 ha)
- Built: 1826
- Built by: Trefethren, Henry Jr.
- Architectural style: Federal
- NRHP reference No.: 83003655
- Added to NRHP: December 29, 1983

The Influence is a historic house on Main Street in Monhegan, Maine. Built in 1826, it is one of the largest and oldest houses in the small island community, built by the son of the last person to own the entire island. The house was listed on the National Register of Historic Places in 1983.

== Description and history ==
Monhegan is a small island community 12 miles (19 km) off the coast of Maine, consisting of Monhegan Island, and a number of nearby smaller islands. Its harbor is situated in the channel between Monhegan and Manana Islands. The Influence stands on a knoll facing Manana Island, on the west side of Main Street, just north of its junction with Fish Beach Lane. The house is a large two-story wood-frame structure, with a hip roof, clapboard siding, and granite foundation. Its formal facades face east (toward the street) and west (toward the harbor); both are five bays wide, with a center entrance flanked by sidelight windows and topped by a narrow cornice. A single-story ell extends to one side.

Monhegan Island was purchased in 1777 by Henry Trefethren, a native of Kittery, Maine. After his death in 1807, the island was divided among his heirs, and property ownership diversified thereafter. His son, also named Henry, continued to exert significant influence in the affairs of the small community, and it was thus that the imposing house he built in 1826 acquired its name. The house was divided into a duplex in 1829 to provide residential space for Henry's son, George.

== See also ==
- National Register of Historic Places listings in Lincoln County, Maine
