= Jefferson Cattle Pound =

- U.S. National Register of Historic Places
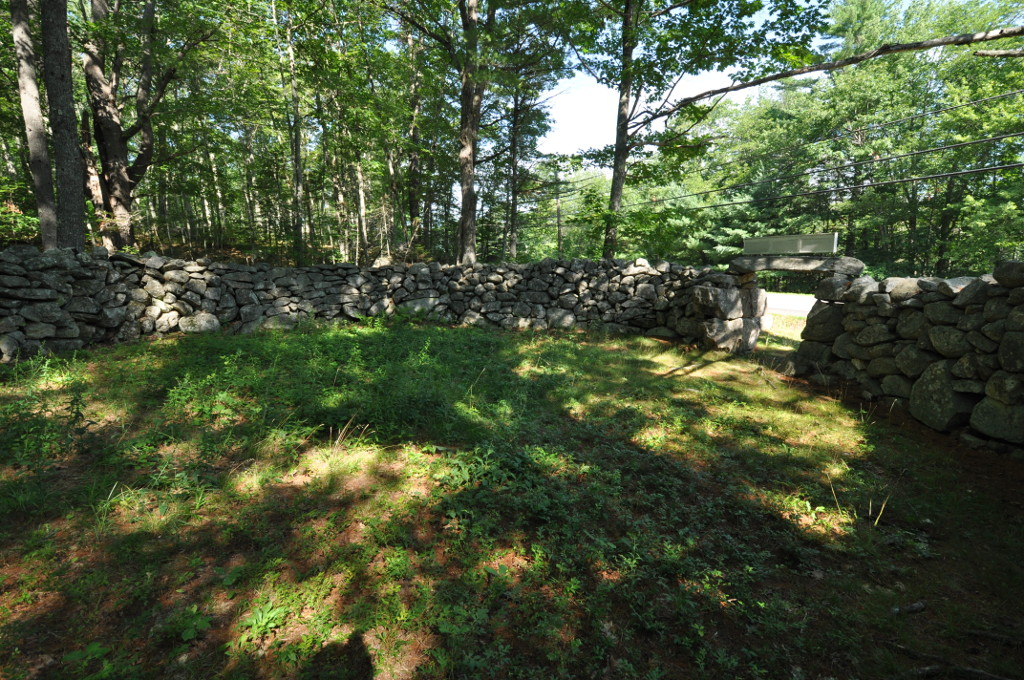
- View from inside the pound

- Location within Maine Location within the United States
- Location: 0.75 mi. W of jct. of Gardiner Rd. and ME 213, Jefferson, Maine
- Coordinates: 44°12′1″N 69°29′48″W
- Area: 0.3 acres (0.12 ha)
- Built: 1829
- Built by: Noyes, Silas
- NRHP reference No.: 04000742
- Added to NRHP: July 28, 2004

The Jefferson Cattle Pound is a historic animal pound in Jefferson, Maine. Built in 1829, it is one of the state's best-preserved stone pounds. It is located on the south side of Gardiner Road (Maine State Route 126), about 0.75 miles (1.21 km) west of its junction with Maine State Route 213. It was listed on the National Register of Historic Places in 2004.

== Description and history ==
The Jefferson Cattle Pound is located in central northern Jefferson, a rural community in northern Lincoln County. It stands on the south side of Gardiner Road in a rural wooded area. It is a circular fieldstone structure about 40 feet (12 m) in diameter, with walls about 7 feet (2.1 m) high. The inside face of the wall is nearly vertical, while the outside is angled, giving the wall a thickness at its base of about 4 feet (1.2 m) and about 3 feet (0.91 m) at its top. Facing the road is an opening about 4.5 feet (1.4 m) wide, formed by roughly squared granite blocks. The opening is topped at a height of about 5.5 feet (1.7 m) by a shaped granite lintel that is about 8 feet (2.4 m) long and 1 foot (0.30 m) thick. There are three iron bolts mounted in the stones on the west side, which originally would have held a sturdy wooden gate. Remnants of lower walls extend from the opening toward the road, at a widening angle. These were historically joined to a stone wall that lined the roadway.

The pound was built for the town by Silas Noyes, a local resident, in 1828 at a cost of $28. Prior to its construction, the town's pound keepers (of which there were seven at one time) had kept stray animals on their own properties. The pound remained in use until about 1888, when the town office of pound keeper was discontinued. Changes in the demographics of farm animals, and the increasing use of barbed wire to limit movements of animals led to a decline in the need for such a public facility. At the time of its listing on the National Register in 2004, it was one of the best-preserved of 21 surviving animal pounds in the state.

== See also ==
- National Register of Historic Places listings in Lincoln County, Maine
