= Sproul Homestead =

Historic house in Maine, United States

- U.S. National Register of Historic Places
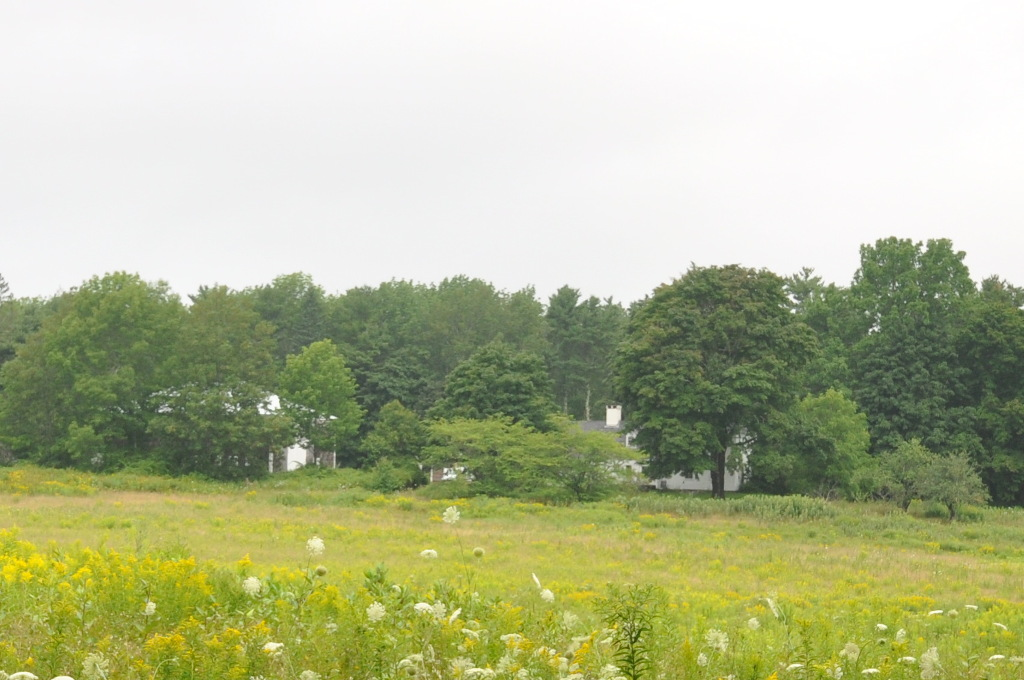

- Location within Maine Location within the United States
- Location: ME 129, South Bristol, Maine
- Coordinates: 43°54′30″N 69°33′11″W
- Area: 2 acres (0.81 ha)
- Built: 1749
- Built by: Robert Sproul
- Architectural style: Colonial, Federal
- NRHP reference No.: 78000188
- Added to NRHP: March 21, 1978

The Sproul Homestead is a historic house on Maine State Route 129 in southern Bristol, Maine. It consists of a c. 1815 Federal period building, which was joined to a c. 1749 colonial Cape style house. Both sections were built by members of the locally prominent Sproul family. The house was listed on the National Register of Historic Places in 1978.

== Description and history ==
The Sproul Homestead stands on the west side of SR 129, near the northern end of the South Bristol peninsula. It is recessed from the road, accessed via a tree-lined lane. The main portion of the house is a two-story hip-roofed frame structure, with interior brick chimneys, clapboard siding, and granite foundation. It has a five-bay front facade, with a center entrance framed by Doric pilasters and topped by a four-light transom window and entablatured lintel. The interior of this section retains Federal period woodwork and decorative features. To the rear (west) extends a 1 1/2-story wood-frame gabled Cape style structure. Its interior includes a former parlor space that retains original woodwork and early decorative stencilling.

James Sproul arrived in the Bristol area in 1729 with Colonel David Dunbar, who sought to establish a colony called "Georgia" at Pemaquid. Although the colony was a failure, the Sprouls remained, and James' son Robert built the Cape that is now the ell in about 1749. Robert's grandson, also named Robert, built what is now the main house in 1815, originally locating it across the street from his father's house. After his father's death in 1833, he moved his house to higher land to the west of its original location, and attached his father's house to it. The Sprouls are still one of the largest families in the area.

== See also ==
- National Register of Historic Places listings in Lincoln County, Maine
