= Jefferson Town House =

- U.S. National Register of Historic Places
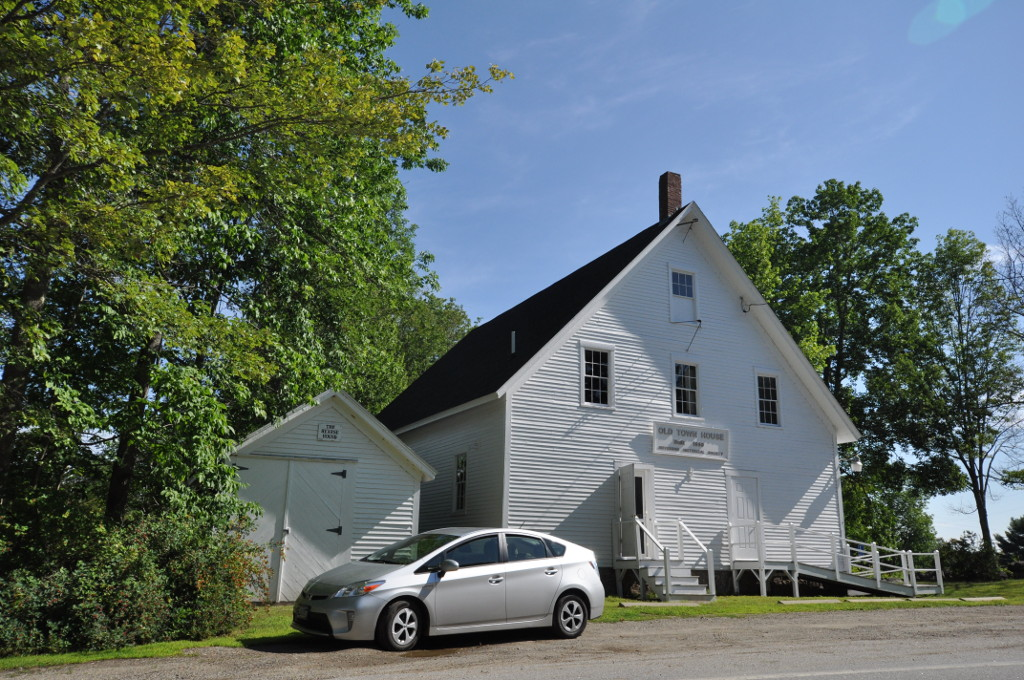

- Location within Maine Location within the United States
- Location: Jefferson, Maine
- Coordinates: 44°12′2″N 69°29′6″W
- Area: less than one acre
- Built: 1869
- Built by: Bruce, Josiah
- Architectural style: Mid 19th Century Revival
- NRHP reference No.: 99000771
- Added to NRHP: July 12, 1999

The Jefferson Town House is the historic former town hall of Jefferson, Maine. It is located at the junction of Maine State Routes 126 and 213. It was built in 1869, and served as the community's town hall until 1958. It is now maintained by the local historical society as a museum. It was listed on the National Register of Historic Places in 1999.

== Description and history ==
The Jefferson Town House is located on the western edge of the dispersed rural village center of Jefferson, on the north side of SR 126 (Gardiner Road) at its junction with SR 213. It is a two-story wood frame structure, with a steep gabled roof, clapboard siding, and a foundation of original fieldstone and replacement concrete piers. Its front facade is symmetrical, with a pair of entrances on the ground floor, three windows in the half-story, and a fourth window near the gable peak. A wooden flagpole is mounted below the topmost window, extending upward in front of it and beyond the gable ridge. The interior of the building has a large meeting space taking up the first floor, and two rooms on the second. Next to the town house stands a small gabled building that once served as a "hearse house", for storage of the town hearse. It is believed to be older than the town house.

The town house was built in 1869 at a cost of $895, replacing an 1828 town house that had been located nearby. The upper level of the building is a relative oddity in Maine's 19th-century town houses, and was apparently rented out to fraternal organizations and used for one season for high school classes. It was leased to the local historical society in 1962, which has taken care of it since.

== See also ==
- National Register of Historic Places listings in Lincoln County, Maine
