= Whitefield Union Hall =

- U.S. National Register of Historic Places
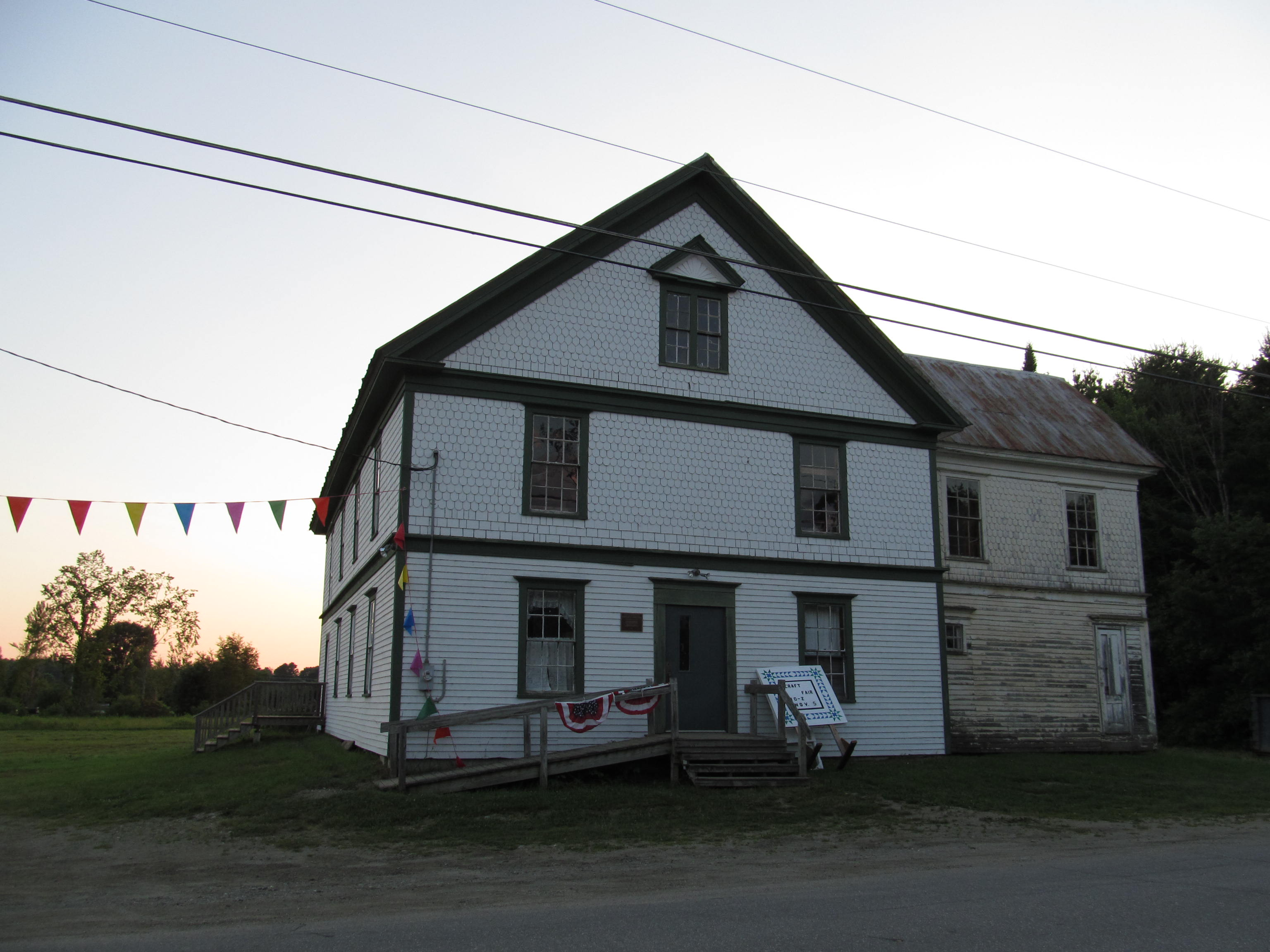

- Location within Maine Location within the United States
- Location: 901 Townhouse Rd., Whitefield, Maine
- Coordinates: 44°10′15″N 69°37′41″W
- Area: 0.2 acres (0.081 ha)
- Built: 1900
- Architectural style: Queen Anne
- NRHP reference No.: 07000014
- Added to NRHP: February 7, 2007

The Whitefield Union Hall is a historic social venue at 901 Townhouse Road in the Kings Mill village of Whitefield, Maine. Built in 1900 by the local Grange chapter and the Whitefield Fish and Game Club, it has served for more than a century as a major social meeting point. It was listed on the National Register of Historic Places in 2007.

== Description and history ==
The Whitefield Union Hall stands on the west side of Townhouse Road, a short way north of its junction with Pittston Road (Maine State Route 194). The small village in which it stands is largely unaltered, having only lost a mill complex (and major local source of jobs) to a hurricane in 1954. The building is a 2-1/2 story wood frame structure with Victorian styling. It is basically L-shaped, with a rectangular main block from which a recessed ell projects to the right. The exterior of the main block is finished in wooden clapboards on the first floor, and with fish-scale shingles above, while the ell is finished in clapboards. The main entrance is at the center of the three-bay facade, flanked by windows that have modest projecting cornices. Similar windows are on the second floor, and there is in the gable end a double window topped by a gabled cornice. The interior of the hall is divided into function spaces, with a dining room and kitchen on the ground floor, and an auditorium with stage on the second floor.

The hall was built in 1900, primarily under the auspices of the Whitefield Fish and Game Club, but with design input from the local Grange chapter, which contributed funds to its construction and was also a major tenant. It was until 1919 the only public hall with a stage in southern Whitefield, playing host to dances, meetings of fraternal and social organizations, and other community events. The hall was managed by an association of the two organizations until 1947, and by the Fish and Game Club after the Grange chapter merged with another in 1969. The club closed down in 1974, and the hall is now managed by a union consortium of village community groups.

== See also ==
- National Register of Historic Places listings in Lincoln County, Maine
