= Hutchins House =

Historic house in Maine, United States

- U.S. National Register of Historic Places
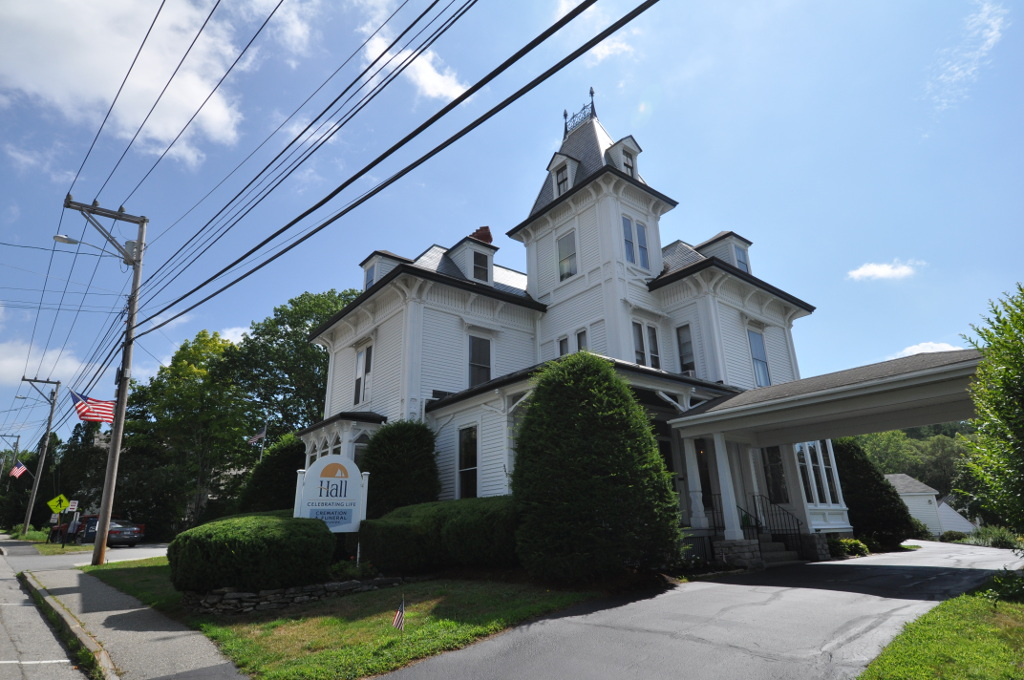

- Location within Maine Location within the United States
- Location: 949 Main St., Waldoboro, Maine
- Coordinates: 44°5′46″N 69°22′26″W
- Area: 0.5 acres (0.20 ha)
- Built: 1879
- Architectural style: Stick/eastlake, Second Empire
- NRHP reference No.: 82000769
- Added to NRHP: February 19, 1982

The Hutchins House is a historic house at 949 Main Street in Waldoboro, Maine. Built in 1879 for the widow of a successful ship's captain and shipbuilder, it is an elaborately decorated example of Second Empire architecture with Stick style features. It was listed on the National Register of Historic Places in 1982; it presently houses a funeral home.

== Description and history ==
The Hutchins House is prominently situated in the village center of Waldoboro, on the north side of Main Street (Maine State Route 220) between the post office and the Broad Bay Congregational United Church. It is a 2 1/2-story wood-frame building, with a roughly rectangular footprint augmented by several projecting sections and a three-story tower. It is covered by a flared hip roof pierced by hipped dormers, and the tower is capped by a hipped roof with iron cresting at the peak. Eaves are decorated with Stick style brackets, and there is applied stick style woodwork on many exterior surfaces. Windows have shallow shed-roof hoods above them, and some have wooden panels below. Projecting bays have windows set in pointed-arch openings, again decorated with Stick style elements.

The house was built about 1879 for "Aunt Mary Hutchins", the widow of Captain Joseph Clark, who built shipping schooners in the town. The architect is not known.

== See also ==
- National Register of Historic Places listings in Lincoln County, Maine
