= Dodge Point Preserve =

Conservation area in Maine, United States

- IUCN category V (protected landscape/seascape)
- Location within Maine
- Location: Newcastle, Lincoln, Maine, United States
- Coordinates: 43°59′25″N 69°33′54″W
- Area: 500 acres (200 ha)
- Established: 1989
- Operator: Damariscotta River Association
- Website: www.damariscottariver.org/trail/dodge-point-public-reserved-land/

Dodge Point Preserve is a state-owned conservation area in Newcastle, Maine. It includes 500 acres (200 ha) of land, with 8,000 feet (2,400 m) of frontage on the Damariscotta River. Public facilities include hiking trails and a dock. The preserve was established in 1989, and is managed by a partnership between the state and the Damariscotta River Association.

== Features ==
The preserve is located in southern Newcastle, with River Road passing through the western third of the property. A parking area and trailhead with informational kiosk is located at the road's northern entry into the reserve. The landscape is dominated by red pine, dating to the land's use as a tree farm, and still subject to occasional harvest by the state. There are more than 5 miles (8.0 km) of marked hiking trails. Near the northern boundary lies Ice Pond, a site historically used for ice harvesting. One section of the shoreline is called Brickyard Beach, for the large number of bricks and brickmaking detritus found there, left from 18th and 19th-century brickmaking operations.

== History ==
The preserve's land has seen human activity since prehistoric times; at least one prehistoric archaeological site (now listed on the National Register of Historic Places has been found there. In the 19th century, the land was cleared for farming, resulting in the creation of the stone walls found throughout the property. In the 20th century, the property was used as a tree farm prior to its acquisition by the state in 1989.

== See also ==
- National Register of Historic Places listings in Lincoln County, Maine
