= Huston House =

Historic house in Maine, United States

- U.S. National Register of Historic Places
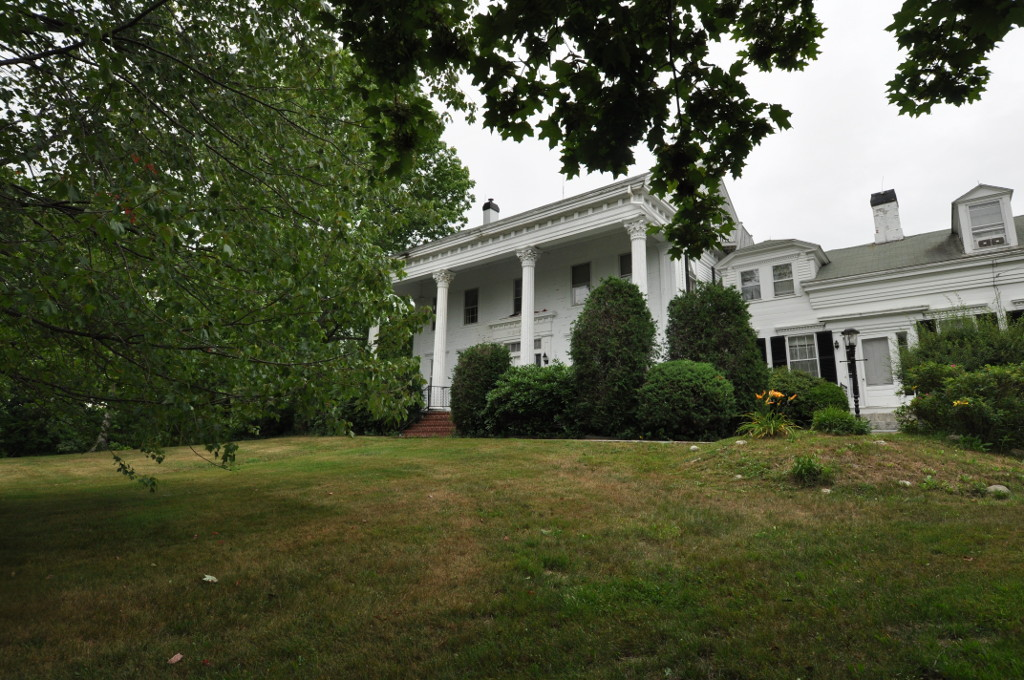

- Location within Maine Location within the United States
- Location: 220 Bristol Rd., Damariscotta, Maine
- Coordinates: 44°1′4″N 69°31′49″W
- Area: 1 acre (0.40 ha)
- Built: 1853; 173 years ago
- Architect: Simmons, Peabody
- Architectural style: Greek Revival
- NRHP reference No.: 85000241
- Added to NRHP: February 8, 1985

The Huston House is a historic house at 220 Bristol Road (Maine State Route 129) in Damariscotta, Maine. Built in 1853, it is a rare statewide example of a large Greek Revival house with a longitudinal temple front. It now serves as home to the Down Easter Inn, and was listed on the National Register of Historic Places in 1985.

== Description and history ==
The Huston House is located south of downtown Damariscotta, on the east side of Bristol Road, just south of Huston Cove Road. It is a large 2 1/2-story timber-frame structure, with a side gable roof that extends beyond the west-facing front facade to form the temple portico. It is supported by large fluted composite order columns, which rise to an entablature with recessed panels extending around the sides. The ground floor windows are topped by cornices with dentil moulding. The interior of the house retains original woodwork and marble fireplace mantels.

The oldest section of the house, which extends from the dining room in the front to the second lilac bush along the side, was built in 1790 by Robert Huston, the first Justice of the Peace of Lincoln County. The Hustons has been one of the first families to settle the peninsula along the river from Damariscotta, and several houses along Bristol Road were built by members of that family. In 1853 James Gilmore Huston added the Greek Revival section of the house, and that, together with the older section, is the house that we see today. Gilmore Huston was a prominent local businessman, operating a sawmill, brickyard, and shipping-related businesses, either on his extensive property surrounding this area, or in downtown Damariscotta.

The Hustons sold the house in 1876 to the Piper family, who owned it until 1959. The Pipers operated a dairy farm on the property stretching across the street to the Damariscotta River and in the massive barn, and operated a sawmill on their extensive properties to the east and north of the house itself.

Design of the house has been ascribed to Peabody Simmons, a native of Union who had studied architecture in Bangor.

== See also ==
- National Register of Historic Places listings in Lincoln County, Maine
