= Dresden Brick School House =

- U.S. National Register of Historic Places
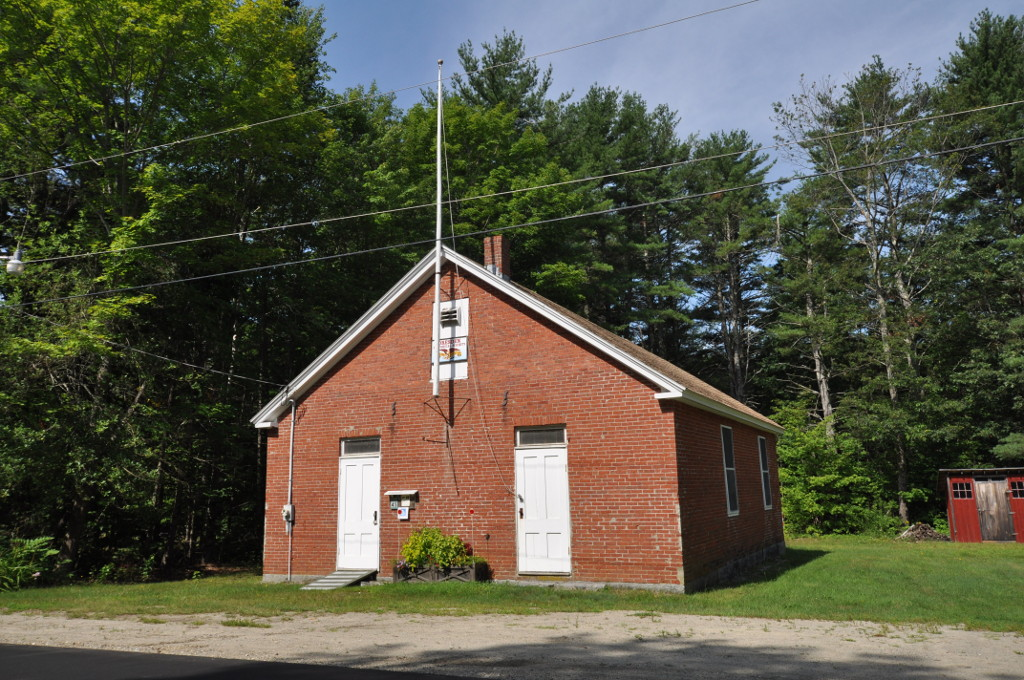

- Location within Maine Location within the United States
- Location: ME 128, Dresden, Maine
- Coordinates: 44°5′7″N 69°46′26″W
- Area: 0.3 acres (0.12 ha)
- Built: 1816
- NRHP reference No.: 86001273
- Added to NRHP: June 13, 1986

The Dresden Brick School House is a historic school building on Maine State Route 128 in Dresden, Maine. Built in 1816, it is one of the oldest surviving brick district school buildings in the state. It is now a museum property, owned by the local historical society. It was listed on the National Register of Historic Places in 1986.

== Description and history ==
The Dresden Brick School House is located on the west side of a rural stretch of ME 128, about 0.25 miles (0.40 km) south of its junction with Maine State Route 197 in West Dresden. It is a single-story brick building, with a gabled roof. The street-facing front facade has a pair of entrances, each devoid of trim except for a transom window above the door, with a window (now boarded over) in the gable above. The sides of the building have two sash windows. The interior of the building has original wainscoting on the walls.

The school was built in 1816, when this area was still called Pownalborough. It is the second-oldest known brick school in the state, after only the Brick School (1810) in nearby Winslow. The school is now maintained by the local historical society, which displays items of local historical interest in the building.

== See also ==
- National Register of Historic Places listings in Lincoln County, Maine
