= Bridge Academy Public Library =

- Bridge Academy
- U.S. National Register of Historic Places
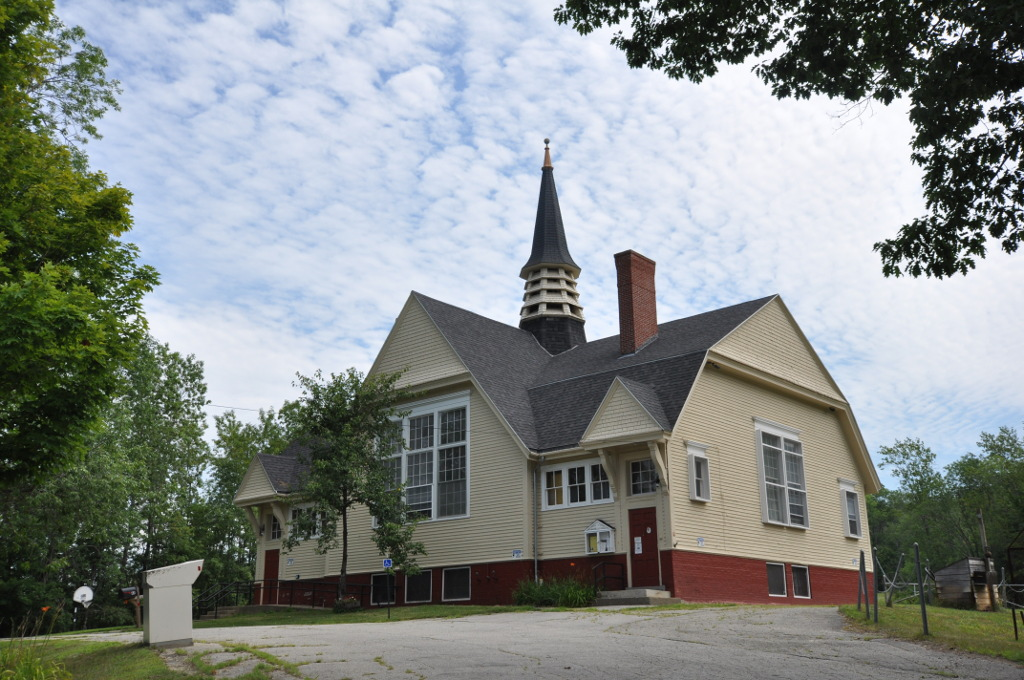

- Location within Maine Location within the United States
- Location: 44 Middle Rd., Dresden, Maine
- Coordinates: 44°6′17″N 69°43′35″W
- Area: less than one acre
- Built: 1890
- Built by: Beedle, Roscoe
- Architect: Clough, George A.
- Architectural style: Shingle Style
- NRHP reference No.: 86003540
- Added to NRHP: January 9, 1987

The Bridge Academy Public Library is the public library of Dresden, Maine. It is located at 44 Middle Road, in the former Bridge Academy building, which served as an area high school from 1890 to 1966, and is a sophisticated example of Shingle style architecture designed by Maine native George A. Clough. The building was listed on the National Register of Historic Places in 1987.

== Architecture and history ==
The Bridge Academy Public Library stands on the east side of Middle Road (Maine State Route 197), a short way south of the town center, where Middle Road meets Maine State Route 27. It is a tall single-story wood frame structure, topped by a tall gambrel roof and set on a deep foundation. Its exterior walls are finished mostly in clapboards, with wooden shingles in a few gable ends. The roof, originally also finished in wooden shingles, is now asphalt. There are entrances at either end of the front facade, set under gabled hoods supported by scrolled brackets. A cross-gable section projects slightly between them, with a gable roof that is raised slightly above that of the main ridge, with an octagonal turret at the central meeting point. The interior of the building originally had a single classroom flanked by entrance halls, whose ceiling conformed to the roof line.

The building's construction came about through two gifts. The first was a large general-purpose bequest by Llewellyn Lithgow, a native son, and the second was gift and the personal efforts of Samuel J. Bridge, who promised to match Lithgow's gift if it was used for a school instead of a bridge over the Kennebec River. George A. Clough, a native of Blue Hill, was the architect; although most of Clough's work took place in Boston, Massachusetts, where he was the city architect for many years, he summered in Maine and is credited with a number of institutional buildings there. This building is the only known example of a late 19th-century school in the Shingle style.

Bridge Academy served as a local high school until 1966, also taking in tuition-paying students from surrounding towns. By 1966, it could no longer meet state requirements for high schools, and was converted to a junior high school. It served in that capacity until 1983, and has since then been adapted for use as the local library.

== See also ==
- National Register of Historic Places listings in Lincoln County, Maine
