= St. John's Anglican Church and Parsonage Site =

- U.S. National Register of Historic Places
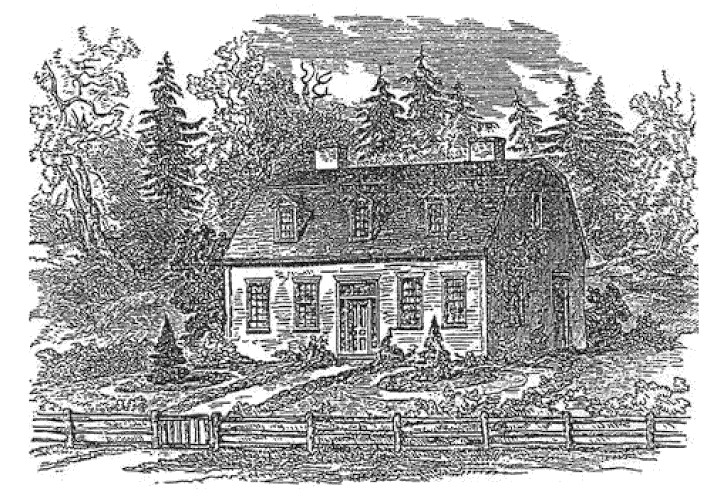
- 1853 depiction of the parsonage house
- Nearest city: Dresden, Maine
- Area: 5 acres (2.0 ha)
- Built: 1770
- Architect: Johnson, Thomas
- NRHP reference No.: 78000187
- Added to NRHP: November 21, 1978

St. John's Anglican Church and Parsonage Site is an historic religious site in Dresden, Maine. It is the site of an Anglican church built in 1770 in what was then called Pownalborough or Frankfort, and was active until 1779. The church congregation was founded in 1760, and the church and parsonage were built with funding support from Dr. Silvester Gardiner, a major area landowner, and operated until 1779, when Jacob Bailey, the minister, fled the area because of his Loyalist views in the American Revolution. The site was listed on the National Register of Historic Places in 1978.

== History ==
The territory that is now Maine was part of the Province of Massachusetts Bay during the colonial period. The part of Lincoln County, Maine that included Dresden and surrounding towns was settled in the 1750s through the efforts of the Kennebec Proprietors, who held title to most of the land in the area. Most of the settlers placed on the eastern bank of the Kennebec were French and German Protestants, who in 1756 petitioned the Society for the Propagation of the Gospel in Foreign Parts for a minister. William McClenachan was sent to the area as an itinerant minister based on the former site of Fort Richmond, but left in 1758. In 1760, the proprietors engineered the creation of Lincoln County, with its headquarters at Frankfort (now Dresden, not to be confused with present-day Frankfort), and sent Jacob Bailey, a recent seminary graduate, to be its first settled minister.

Bailey was at first settled near the Pownalborough Courthouse, which is where he held Anglican services until 1770, when Dr. Silvester Gardiner, the principal proprietor resident in the area, funded construction of a church and parsonage house. Bailey was Loyalist in his political views, and fled the area in 1779 amid hostility both to his political views and his religious ones, the latter occasioned by resentment and mistrust among powerful Congregationalist businessmen and politicians in the region.

Bailey described the church that was built at Pownalborough as follows: "The dimensions of the Church are sixty feet in length including the chancel and thirty two feet in breadth. I acknowledge not only the generosity of Dr. Gardiner, but also the charitable assistance of several gentlemen in Marblehead and other places." The parish was formally dedicate as "St. John's" in 1773. Congregationalists sought to dispute ownership of the land on which the church and parsonage were built, bringing suit against the parish; this matter was resolved out of court by Dr. Gardiner. Despite considerable hostility to the church and Bailey personally with the outbreak of the American Revolutionary War in 1775, he kept the church open until 1778. He withdrew to Halifax, Nova Scotia in 1779. The church and parsonage thereafter fell into decay, although lay attempts to maintain it continued through the 1780s.

== See also ==
- National Register of Historic Places listings in Lincoln County, Maine

== Sources ==
- Batchelder, Calvin Redington (1874). A History of the Eastern Diocese: In Three Volumes, Volume 1. Claremont, NH: Claremont Manufacturing Company. OCLC 13951641.
