= Walpole Meetinghouse =

Historic church in Maine, United States

- U.S. National Register of Historic Places
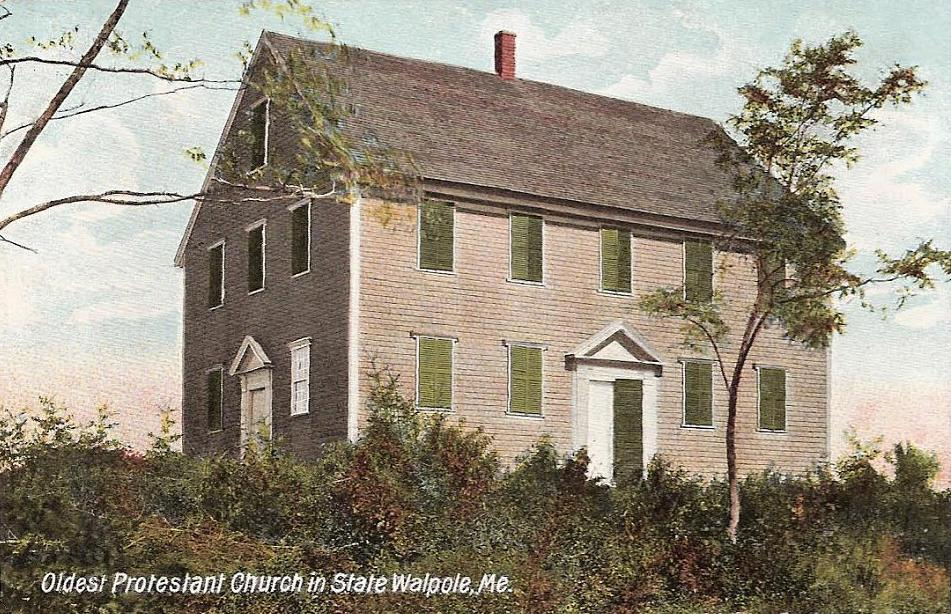
- Walpole Meetinghouse in a c. 1908 postcard

- Location within Maine Location within the United States
- Location: Walpole Meeting House Rd., Walpole, Maine
- Coordinates: 43°59′9″N 69°32′28″W
- Area: 1 acre (0.40 ha)
- Built: 1772
- NRHP reference No.: 76000104
- Added to NRHP: November 07, 1976

The Walpole Meetinghouse is a historic church on Walpole Meeting House Road in the Walpole area of South Bristol, Maine. Built in 1772, it is a well-preserved and little-altered example of a late colonial church in coastal Maine, and one of the oldest actively used churches in the state. It was listed on the National Register of Historic Places in 1976. It is maintained by a non-profit organization, and is still used occasionally for summer services.

== Description and history ==
The Walpole Meetinghouse stands on the north side of Walpole Meeting House Road, just east of Maine State Route 129. It is a two-story wood frame structure, with a gabled roof and an original wooden shingle exterior, fastened with hand-cut nails. It has entrances on three sides, with the main entrance on the long south facade. It is a double door flanked by pilasters and topped by a pedimented gable. Similar details are also found on the western entrance, while the eastern one has a modest surround. The doors all enter the single main chamber, where the ground floor is dominated by a series of box pews and the elevated pulpit on the north wall, backed by a large wooden soundboard supported by fluted wooden pilasters that have a marbleized paint finish. Stairs to the gallery are located in the front corners.

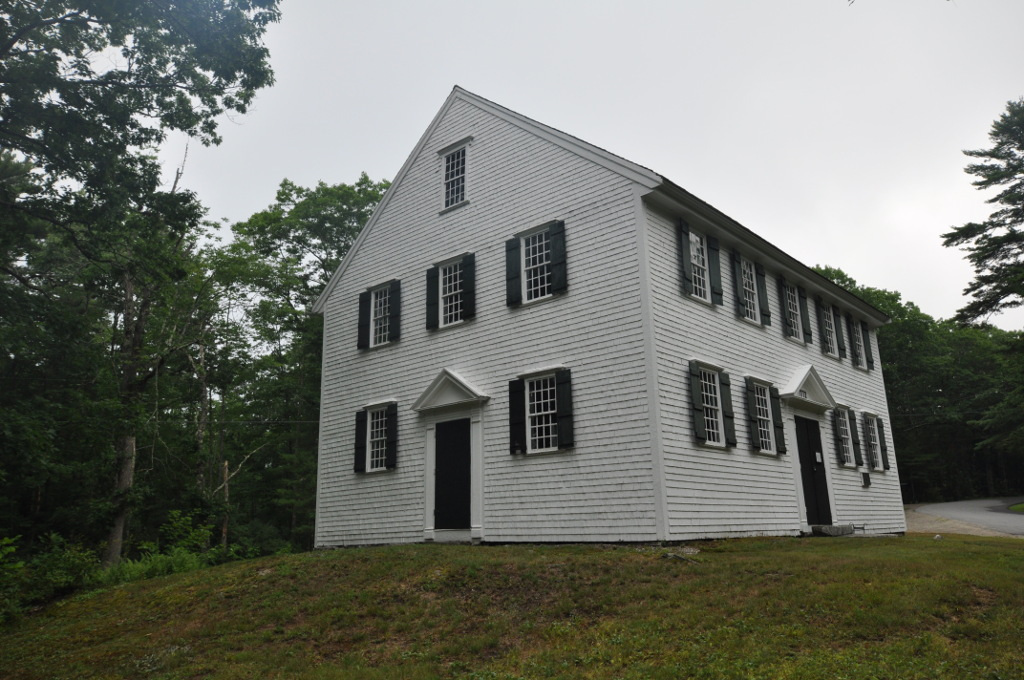
The meetinghouse in 2018

The meetinghouse was built in 1772, and originally housed a predominantly Presbyterian congregation of Scottish immigrants. Because the presbytery was based far away in Boston, the congregation eventual became Congregationalist. During major restorative work in the late 19th century, the original exterior shingling was found to be in good condition, and was not replaced.

== See also ==
- National Register of Historic Places listings in Lincoln County, Maine
