= Emily Means House =

Historic house in Maine, United States

- U.S. National Register of Historic Places
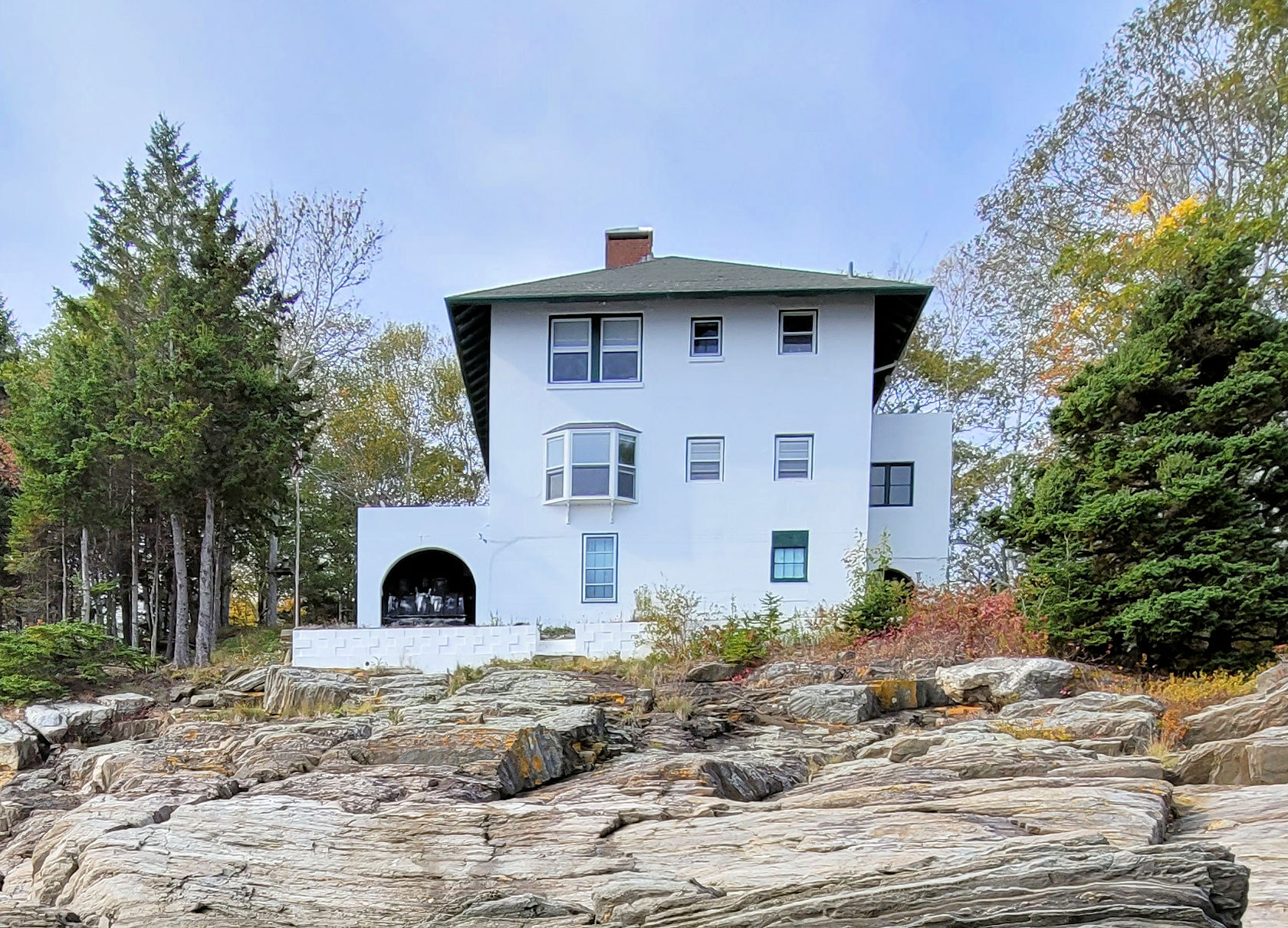

- Location within Maine Location within the United States
- Location: Birch Island, South Bristol, Maine
- Coordinates: 43°50′58″N 69°32′57″W
- Area: 8 acres (3.2 ha)
- Built: 1914
- Built by: Very, Samuel R. T.
- Architectural style: Mediterranean Revival
- NRHP reference No.: 85000242
- Added to NRHP: February 8, 1985

The Emily Means House is a historic house on Birch Island in South Bristol, Maine. Built in 1914, it is a distinctive local example of Mediterranean Revival architecture, designed by New York architect Samuel Very. It was built for Emily Means, a nationally known horticulturalist. It was listed on the National Register of Historic Places in 1985.

== Description and history ==
Birch Island is a small island on the east side of Rutherford Island, which makes up the southernmost portion of the town of South Bristol. Birch Island is just northeast of the village of Christmas Cove, and is separated from the larger island by narrow channel, which is now spanned by a private bridge. The Emily Means House is set on the east side of Birch Island, overlooking Johns Bay. It is a two-story masonry structure, built out of terra cotta tile finished in smooth stucco, and covered by a tile hip roof. The roof has extended eaves with exposed rafters. The ground floor on the eastern (water-facing) side consists of a terrace with an arcade of rounded arches. The main entrance, located on the north side, is also set in a round-arch opening. The interior of the house is in an austere and restrained version of the Colonial Revival, and retains significant original woodwork.

The house was built in 1914 as a summer residence for Emily Means, a nationally known horticulturalist. It was designed for her by New York City architect Samuel R.T. Very, and is distinctive within the small community for its Mediterranean styling. Means had purchased Birch Island in 1900, and planted extensive rock gardens with exotic specimens on the island.

== See also ==
- National Register of Historic Places listings in Lincoln County, Maine
