= Maine State Route 126 =

State highway in Maine, US

State Route 126

Route information
- Maintained by MaineDOT
- Length: 48.78 mi (78.50 km)

Major junctions
- West end: US 202 / SR 100 in Lewiston
- I-95 / Maine Turnpike in West Gardiner; I-295 in West Gardiner; US 201 in Gardiner
- East end: SR 220 in Washington

Location
- Country: United States
- State: Maine
- Counties: Androscoggin, Kennebec, Knox, Lincoln

Highway system
- Maine State Highway System; Interstate; US; State; Auto trails; Lettered highways
← SR 125	→ SR 127

State Route 126 (SR 126) is a state highway in central Maine connecting Lewiston and Washington.

== Route description ==
SR 126 begins at an intersection with U.S. Route 202 (US 202) and SR 100 in Lewiston. In Sabattus, it begins a long concurrency with SR 9, which continues until it reaches Gardiner. Along the way, it intersects with Interstate 295 (I-295) just outside Gardiner. From Gardiner, it travels eastward towards Washington.

== History ==
SR 126 was originally designated in 1925 and ran between Lewiston and Richmond Corner. In 1929, the road was extended to Jefferson. Shortly thereafter, it was extended to its current terminus near Washington.

== Junction list ==
County	Location	mi	km	Destinations	Notes
Androscoggin	Lewiston	0.0	0.0	US 202 / SR 100 (Main Street) – Auburn, Greene, Augusta	Western terminus
Androscoggin	Sabattus	5.9	9.5	SR 9 west (Middle Road) – Lisbon Falls	Western end of SR 9 concurrency
Androscoggin	Sabattus	6.8	10.9	SR 132 north (Wales Road) – Wales, Monmouth	Southern terminus of SR 132
Androscoggin	Sabattus	8.0	12.9	SR 197 east (Litchfield Road) – Richmond	Western terminus of SR 197
Kennebec	West Gardiner	22.5	36.2	I-95 south / Maine Turnpike south – Lewiston, Auburn, West Gardiner Service Plaza	Roundabout; exit 102 on I-95 / Turnpike
Kennebec	West Gardiner	22.7	36.5	I-295 to I-95 north / Maine Turnpike north – Brunswick, Augusta	Exit 51 on I-295; I-295 north not signed
Kennebec	Gardiner	25.7	41.4	US 201 south (Brunswick Avenue)	Western end of US 201 concurrency
Kennebec	Gardiner	26.0	41.8	US 201 north / SR 24 south (Church Street) / SR 27 north – Hallowell, Augusta	Eastern end of US 201 concurrency; northern terminus of SR 24; western end of SR 27 concurrency
Kennebec	Randolph	26.2	42.2	SR 9 east (Water Street) – Augusta	Eastern end of SR 9 concurrency
Kennebec	Randolph	26.4	42.5	SR 226 east (Windsor Street) – Togus U.S.V.A.	Western terminus of SR 226
Kennebec	Pittston	27.1	43.6	SR 27 south – Wiscasset	Eastern end of SR 27 concurrency
Lincoln	Whitefield	36.3	58.4	SR 218 (East River Road) – Alna, Wiscasset	
Lincoln	Jefferson	39.1	62.9	SR 215 (Clary Road) – Newcastle	
Lincoln	Jefferson	42.1	67.8	SR 213 south (Bunker Hill Road) – Newcastle	Northern terminus of SR 213
Lincoln	Jefferson	42.6	68.6	SR 32 north (Augusta Road)	Western end of SR 32 concurrency
Lincoln	Jefferson	43.7	70.3	SR 32 south (Waldoboro Road) – Waldoboro	Eastern end of SR 32 concurrency
Knox	Washington	48.78	78.50	SR 220 (Waldoboro Road)	Eastern terminus
1.000 mi = 1.609 km; 1.000 km = 0.621 mi: Concurrency terminus
