= Maine State Route 215 =

State highway in Lincoln County, Maine, US

State Route 215

Route information
- Maintained by MaineDOT
- Length: 17.24 mi (27.75 km)

Major junctions
- South end: US 1 Bus. in Newcastle
- North end: SR 32 in Jefferson

Location
- Country: United States
- State: Maine
- Counties: Lincoln

Highway system
- Maine State Highway System; Interstate; US; State; Auto trails; Lettered highways
← SR 214	→ SR 216

State Route 215 (SR 215) is a state highway in the U.S. state of Maine. It runs for about 17 miles (27 km) between Newcastle at U.S. Route 1 Business (US 1 Bus.) and Jefferson at SR 32, entirely in Lincoln County.

== Route description ==
SR 215 begins at an intersection with US 1 Bus. and Academy Hill Road in Newcastle. The business route of US 1 runs to the southwest towards US 1 south and to the southeast towards Damariscotta. SR 215 heads northeast along Mills Road passing a few houses before coming to a half-diamond interchange with the limited-access US 1 expressway. Ramps are provided to US 1 northbound and from US 1 southbound. North of the interchange, SR 215 begins to closely follow the Damariscotta River/Salt Bay on its east side and businesses and churches on the west side. It crosses a railroad at a skewed grade crossing and enters the village of Damariscotta Falls. The road reaches Austin Road which carries the southbound lane of SR 215 through the village. The northbound lane of SR 215 continues north along Mills Road, through the road itself is still bidirectional. After crossing a short bridge over the river, SR 215 northbound enters the town of Nobleboro. At Main Street, northbound SR 215 turns west onto the one-way road and climbs a small hill passing numerous houses. It descends this hill and crosses the river again reentering Newcastle, now arriving at a wye intersection with the other end of Austin Road (southbound SR 215).

Both directions of SR 215 continue west along Pond Road heading south of Damariscotta Lake. The road then curves to the north to head along the west side of the lake traveling along rolling hills. After passing the southern terminus of SR 213, SR 215 heads west through a wooded area. It then makes a turn to the north along Ridge Road at its intersection with SR 194's eastern terminus near the settlement of North Newcastle. Along Ridge Road, the route heads past some houses, small clearings, and wooded areas. It enters the town of Jefferson where the road name changes to South Clary Road. The road passes between several hills, the tallest of which is named Dyer Hill. It heads through the settlement of South Jefferson where SR 215 passes several houses and small farms. After crossing the Dyer River, the road briefly jogs northwest and then comes to a wye intersection with SR 126. SR 126 and SR 215 share a short 0.1-mile-long (0.16 km) concurrency until SR 215 breaks off the concurrency at a second wye intersection. Now heading north on North Clary Road, the road winds its way through wooded area. It climbs to the top of Brooks Turner Hill and shortly afterwards, comes to an end at SR 32.

== Major junctions ==
The entire route is in Lincoln County.

Location	mi	km	Destinations	Notes
Newcastle	0.00	0.00	US 1 Bus. (Main Street) to Academy Hill Road south / US 1 – Damariscotta	
Newcastle	0.33– 0.44	0.53– 0.71	US 1 north (Atlantic Highway) – Nobleboro	Interchange; southbound US 1 exit / northbound US 1 entrance only
Newcastle	4.09	6.58	SR 213 north (Bunker Hill Road) – Jefferson	Southern terminus of SR 213
Newcastle	5.68	9.14	SR 194 west (Jones Woods Road) – Alna, Whitefield	Eastern terminus of SR 194
Jefferson	14.63	23.54	SR 126 west (Gardiner Road) – Whitefield	Southern end of SR 126 concurrency
Jefferson	14.76	23.75	SR 126 east (Gardiner Road) – Jefferson	Northern end of SR 126 concurrency
Jefferson	17.24	27.75	SR 32 (Augusta Road) – Windsor, Jefferson, Waldoboro	
1.000 mi = 1.609 km; 1.000 km = 0.621 mi: Concurrency terminus; Incomplete access
