= Alna School =

- U.S. National Register of Historic Places
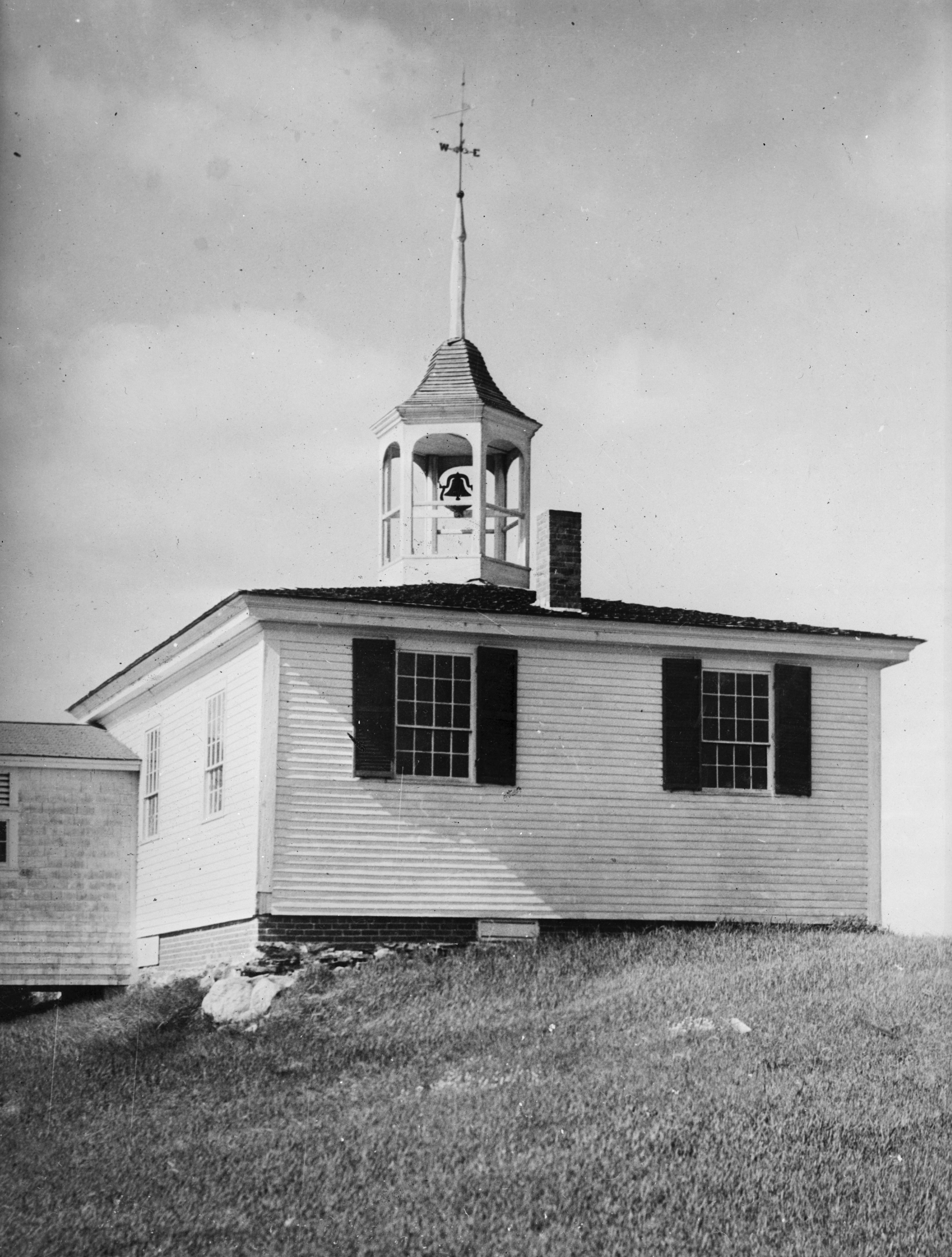
- Alna School in 1936.

- Location within Maine Location within the United States
- Location: Alna Center, Alna, Maine
- Coordinates: 44°4′56″N 69°37′8″W
- Area: 1 acre (0.40 ha)
- Built: 1795
- Architect: Carlton, Moses; Averill, Samuel
- Architectural style: Federal
- NRHP reference No.: 75000101
- Added to NRHP: April 28, 1975

The Alna School is located on Alna Road in the town of Alna, Maine. Built in 1795, it is one of the oldest surviving school buildings in the state. It has also housed Alna's town offices. It was added to the National Register of Historic Places on April 28, 1975.

== Description and history ==
The Alna School is located in central Alna, a rural community in Lincoln County, Maine. It is set on the west side of Alna Road (Maine State Route 218), north of its junction with Golden Ridge Road and south of the historic Alna Meetinghouse. The school is a single story wood-frame structure, with a low-pitch hipped roof topped by an open octagonal cupola with bell. Its exterior is finished in wooden clapboards, and it rests on a brick foundation. There are two windows on each side, with the main entrance set near one corner. A small single story addition, of 20th-century origin, has been added.

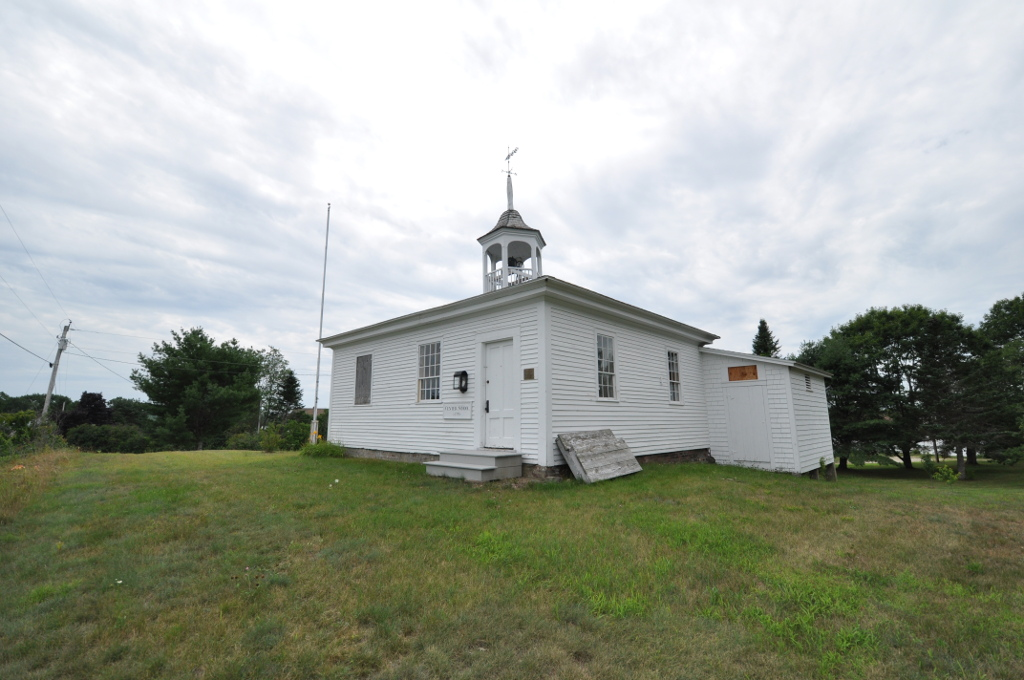
The school in 2018

The school was built in 1795, by either Moses Carlton or Samuel Averill, each of whom was contracted by the newly incorporated town to build a school; it is not known which of the two built this school. The cupola was added in the early 19th century. The building served the town as a school well into the 20th century. It is the second-oldest school in Maine; only the Old Schoolhouse in York is older (1755).

== See also ==
- Education in Maine
- National Register of Historic Places listings in Lincoln County, Maine
