= Dyer River =

Location
- Country: United States

Physical characteristics
- Source
  - location: Maine
  - elevation: 230 feet (70 m)
- Mouth
  - location: Sheepscot River
  - coordinates: 44°03′03″N 69°36′35″W
  - elevation: 0 ft (0 m)
- Length: 20 mi (32 km)

The Dyer River is a 20.2-mile-long (32.5 km) river in Maine. It originates along the northern boundary of the town of Jefferson with the town of Somerville (44°14′13″N 69°28′12″W) and flows southwesterly through Jefferson, passing through Dyer Long Pond and near South Jefferson. It continues southwest into the town of Newcastle, passing the villages of North Newcastle and Sheepscot where it joins the tidal Sheepscot River. The Dyer river is integral to the health of the Dyer River Valley preserve where each year thousands of migrant birds rest and feed on their trek. Additionally, the Dyer River valley houses several bald eagles and red tailed hawks.

== See also ==
- List of rivers of Maine
