= Maine State Route 213 =

State highway in Lincoln County, Maine, US

State Route 213
- Bunker Hill Road

Route information
- Maintained by MaineDOT
- Length: 9.26 mi (14.90 km)

Major junctions
- South end: SR 215 in Newcastle
- North end: SR 126 in Jefferson

Location
- Country: United States
- State: Maine
- Counties: Lincoln

Highway system
- Maine State Highway System; Interstate; US; State; Auto trails; Lettered highways
← SR 212	→ SR 214

State Route 213 (SR 213) is part of Maine's system of numbered state highways, located entirely in Lincoln County. It runs from SR 215 in Newcastle to SR 126 at Jefferson. For the entire length, the route is known as Bunker Hill Road.

== Junction list ==
The entire route is in Lincoln County.

Location	mi	km	Destinations	Notes
Newcastle	0.00	0.00	SR 215 (Pond Road / Jones Woods Road) – Newcastle, Whitefield	
Jefferson	9.26	14.90	SR 126 (Gardiner Road / Bunker Hill Road) – Jefferson, North Whitefield, Gardiner	
1.000 mi = 1.609 km; 1.000 km = 0.621 mi
