= Sheepscot Historic District =

Historic district in Maine, United States

- U.S. National Register of Historic Places
- U.S. Historic district
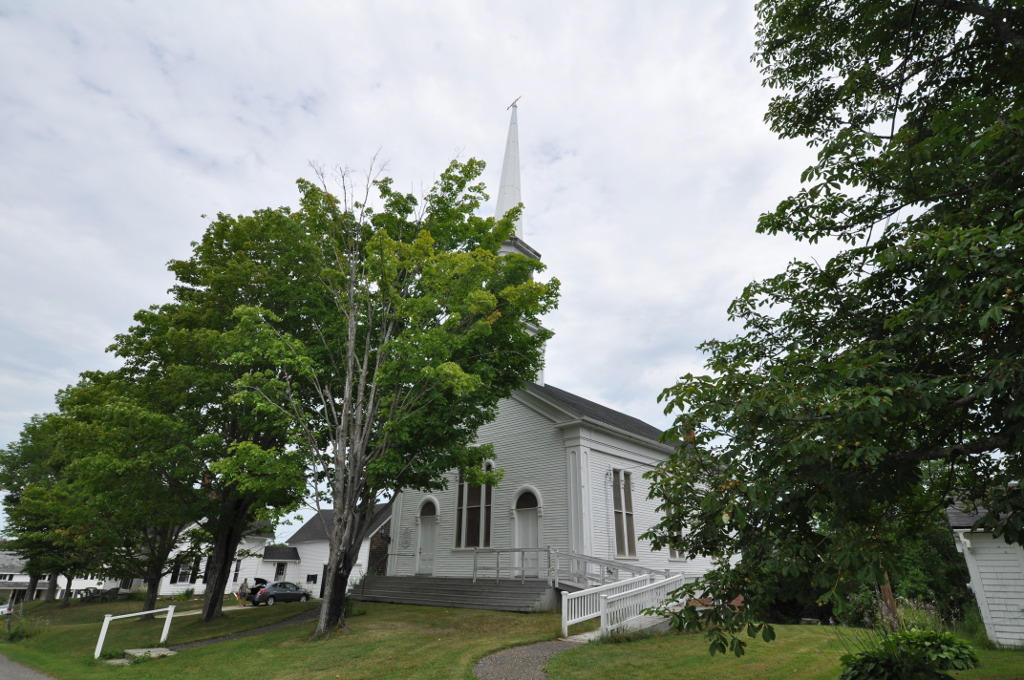
- The Sheepscot Community Church

- Location within Maine Location within the United States
- Location: At the confluence of Sheepscot River and Dyer Brook, Alna and Newcastle, Maine
- Coordinates: 44°3′0″N 69°36′35″W
- Area: 1,200 acres (490 ha)
- Built: 1635
- Architectural style: Italianate, Greek Revival, Federal
- NRHP reference No.: 78000424
- Added to NRHP: June 23, 1978

The Sheepscot Historic District encompasses a historic village in Alna and Newcastle, Maine. Located just below the mouth of Dyer Brook where it enters the Sheepscot River, the 1,200-acre (490 ha) includes an area that has seen little alteration in more than 100 years, and includes one of the oldest roadways in the state. The area is archaeologically sensitive for prehistoric and historic settlement sites. The district was added to the National Register of Historic Places on June 23, 1978.

== Description and history ==
The village of Sheepscot lies astride a narrow point in the upper tidal section of the Sheepscot River, which is the border between the towns of Newcastle and Alna. The main portion of the village consists of a row of closely spaced houses along The King's Highway, one of the Maine's oldest roads, which runs south from the east-west Sheepscot Road on the Newcastle side of the river, just south of the mouth of Dyer Creek. Just south of the junction stands the Sheepscott [sic] Community Church, and there are a scattering of residences on the Alna side. The buildings exhibit a range of 19th-century architecture styles, from the Federal, through the Greek Revival, to the Italianate period.

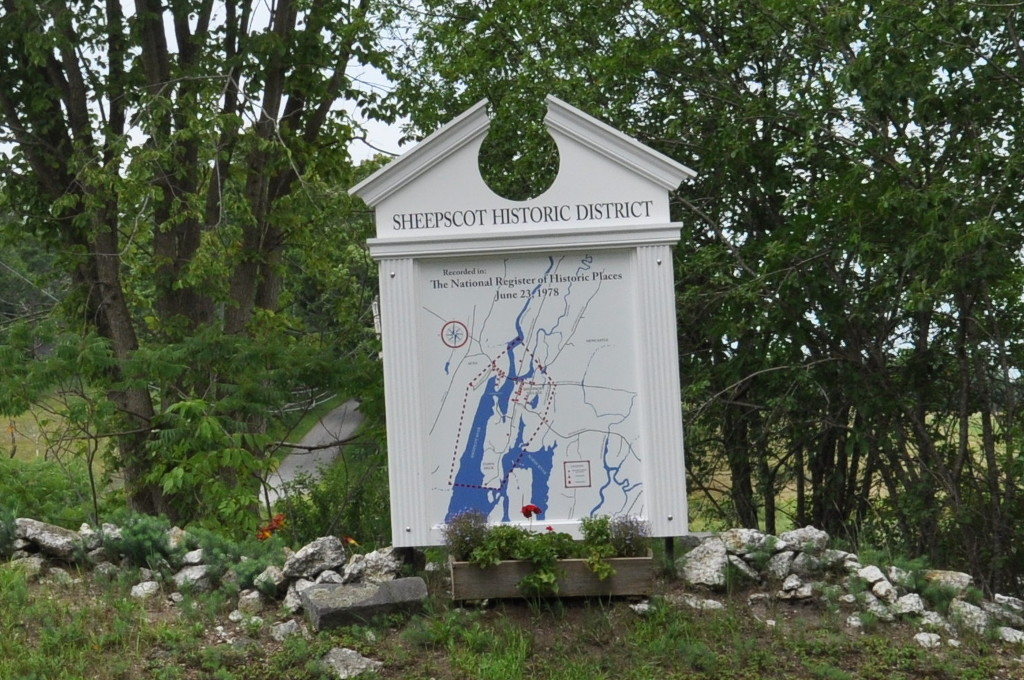
Marker in Newcastle indicating the boundaries of the district

The area has a colonial settlement history dating at least to the 1630s, and possibly the 1620s, and was before then the site of Native American activity. The Sheepscot area fell between major land grants, one bounded on the east by the Kennebec River, the other on the west by the Damariscotta River. The first bridge spanning the Sheepscot was built here in 1794, and the present bridge occupies roughly the original footprint of that bridge.

== See also ==
- National Register of Historic Places listings in Lincoln County, Maine
