= Jennifer Mayher =

American politician

Member-elect of the Maine House of Representatives from the 46th district
- Assuming office January 2027
- Succeeding: Lydia Crafts

Personal details
- Party: Democratic
- Education: Harvard College; Teachers College, Columbia University

Jennifer Mayher is an American politician. A member of the Democratic Party from Newcastle, she is the member-elect for the 46th district of the Maine House of Representatives.

Mayher attended Harvard College, earning her bachelor's degree in 1993. She also attended Teachers College, Columbia University, earning her Master of Education degree in 1999.
