= West Branch Sheepscot River =

Location
- Country: United States

Physical characteristics
- Source
  - location: Maine
  - elevation: 410 feet (120 m)
- Mouth
  - location: Sheepscot River
  - coordinates: 44°14′26″N 69°34′23″W
  - elevation: 110 feet (34 m)
- Length: 25 miles (40 km)

The West Branch Sheepscot River is a 24.9-mile-long (40.1 km) river in Maine. The branch originates in the northwest corner of Palermo (44°27′27″N 69°25′20″W) and flows southwesterly through Branch Pond and the village of Weeks Mills in the town of China. The branch then flows southerly through the town of Windsor to a confluence with the Sheepscot River between Coopers Mills and North Whitefield. The branch is bridged by Maine State Route 3 between Branch Pond and Weeks Mills, by Maine State Route 105 at Windsor and by concurrent Maine State Routes 17 and 32 near Coopers Mills.

== See also ==
- List of rivers of Maine
