= Second Congregational Church of Newcastle =

Historic church in Maine, United States

- U.S. National Register of Historic Places
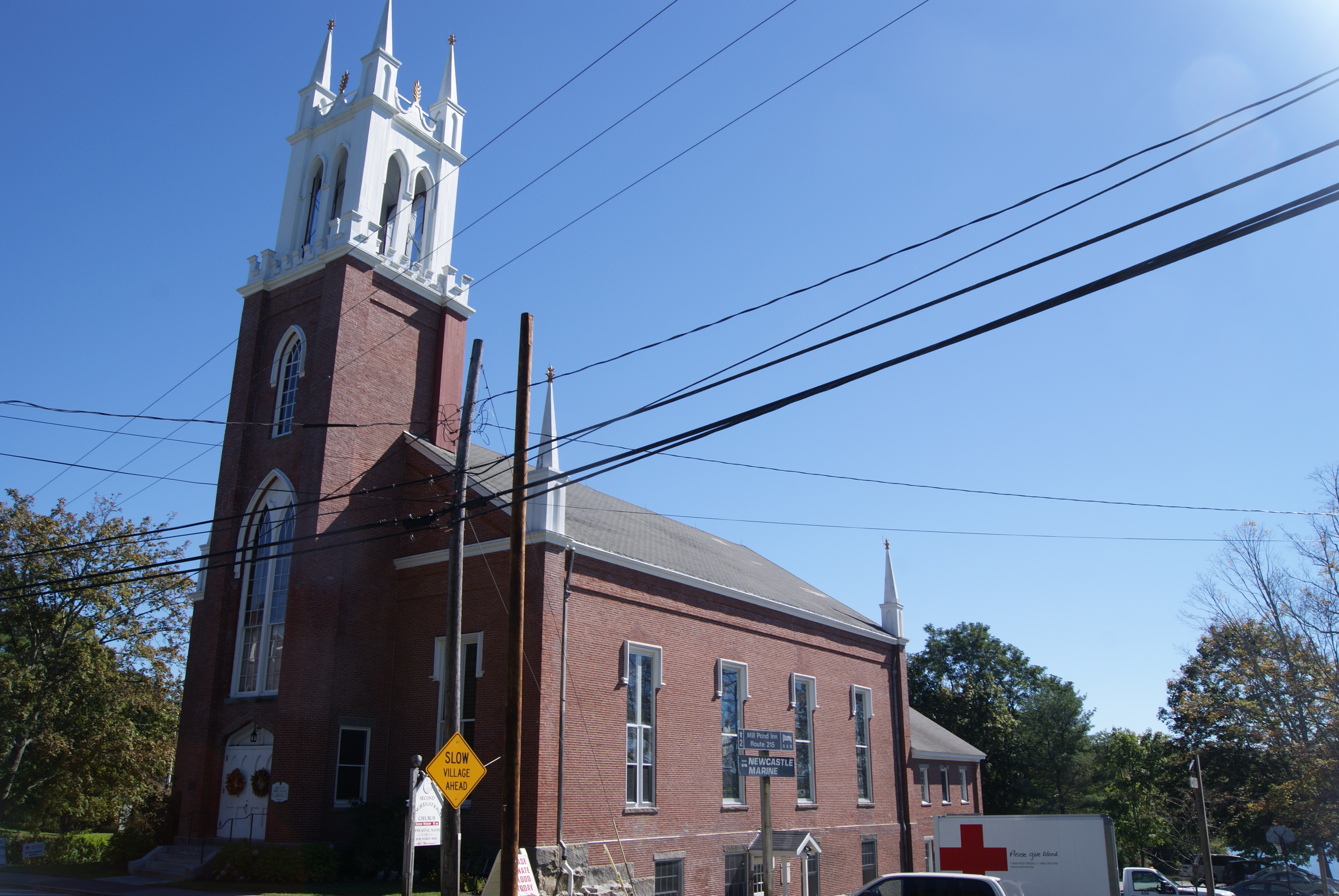

- Location within Maine Location within the United States
- Location: 51 Main Street, Newcastle, Maine
- Coordinates: 44°2′4″N 69°32′15″W
- Area: 0.5 acres (0.20 ha)
- Built: 1848
- Architectural style: Gothic Revival
- NRHP reference No.: 79000156
- Added to NRHP: May 07, 1979

The Second Congregational Church of Newcastle is a historic church on River Street in Newcastle, Maine. Built in 1848, it is one of Mid Coast Maine's finest examples of brick Gothic Revival architecture. It was listed on the National Register of Historic Places in 1979. The congregation, established in 1843, is affiliated with the United Church of Christ.

== Description and history ==
The Second Congregational Church of Newcastle stands in the town center, just south of the junction of United States Route 1 Business and Maine State Route 215. It is a single-story brick building with wooden trim and a gable roof. Projecting from the center of the main facade is a tower, which houses the main entrance at the base. The tower and building corners are articulated by pilasters; the tower has Gothic arched windows on the front, and rises to a wooden crenellation that surrounds an open wood-frame belfry. The belfry also has corner pilasters, and its openings are also arched in the Gothic style. The belfry is topped by corner pinnacles joined by a decorative swag-like rail.

The first congregation to be established in what is now Newcastle was founded in the village of Sheepscot in 1797. The second congregation was organized in 1843 to meet the needs of the growing Damariscotta community (just across the Damariscotta River), and the present church was built for it in 1849. The church is a highly visible landmark, especially for travelers arriving by boat on the river.

== See also ==
- National Register of Historic Places listings in Lincoln County, Maine
