= The Alna Store =

Restaurant in Alna, Maine, U.S.

- Interactive map of The Alna Store

Restaurant information
- Location: 2 Dock Road, Alna, Maine, 04535, United States
- Coordinates: 44°6′0″N 69°36′52″W

The Alna Store is a restaurant in Alna, Maine.

== Reception ==
In 2024, The Alna Store was a semifinalist in the Best New Restaurant category of the James Beard Foundation Awards.
