= Alna Meetinghouse =

Historic church in Maine, United States

- U.S. National Register of Historic Places
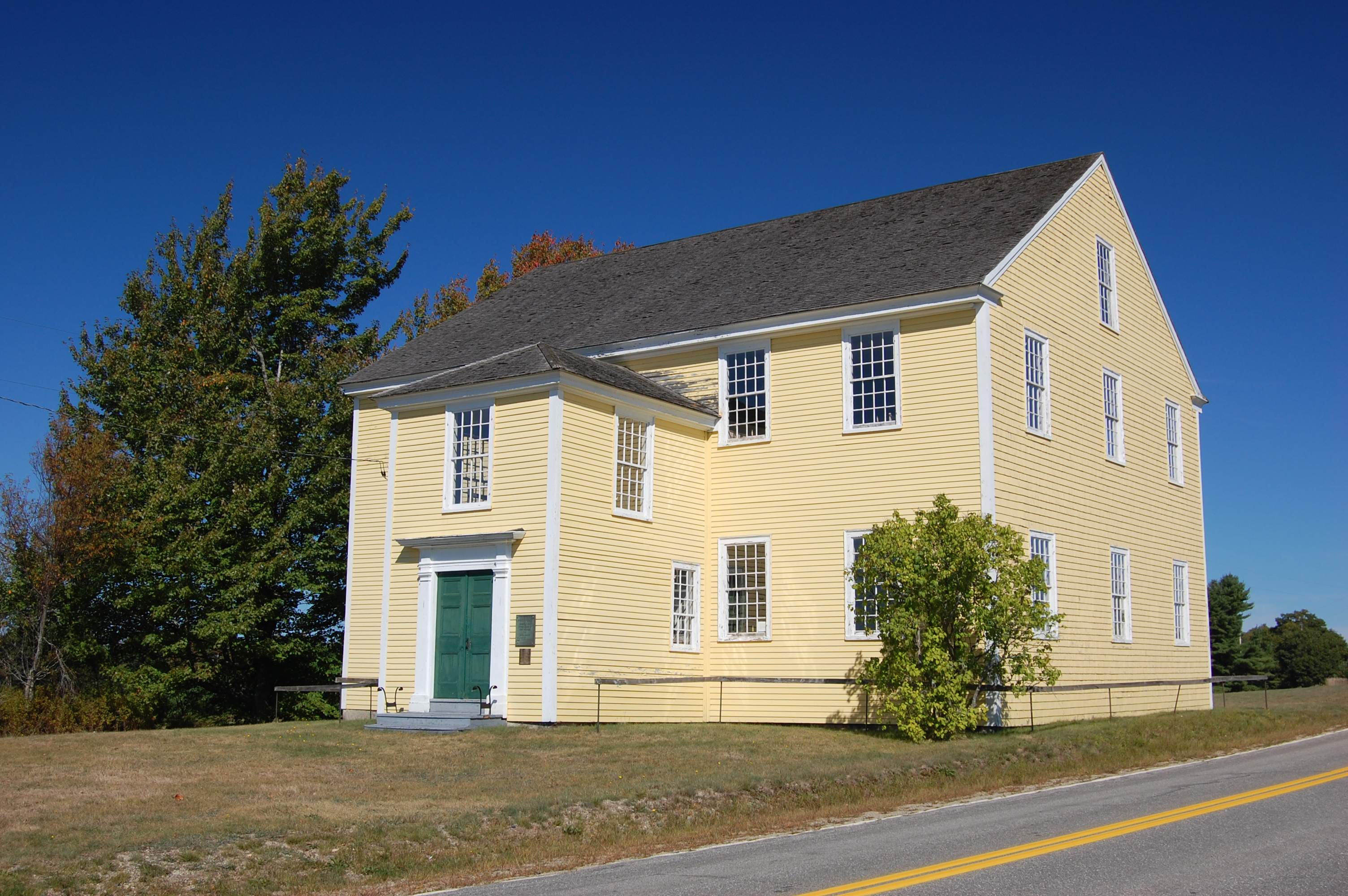
- Side of the meetinghouse

- Location within Maine Location within the United States
- Location: ME 218, Alna Center, Maine
- Coordinates: 44°5′15″N 69°37′3″W
- Area: 0.2 acres (0.081 ha)
- Built: 1789
- Architectural style: Colonial
- NRHP reference No.: 70000079
- Added to NRHP: May 19, 1970

The Alna Meetinghouse is a historic meeting house on Maine State Route 218 in Alna Center, Maine. Built in 1789, it is one of the oldest churches in the state, with a virtually intact interior. It was listed on the National Register of Historic Places in 1970.

== Description ==
The Alna Meetinghouse is located on the west side of Maine 218, a short way north of Alna Cemetery and about 1.3 miles (2.1 km) south of the road's Sheepscot River crossing. It is set close to the road, and faces south. The building is a 2 1/2-story wooden structure, with a side gable roof and exterior of clapboards and wooden shingles. It has no tower, and a gable-roofed entry vestibule and stairhouse projects from the center of the five-bay front facade. The entrance is flanked by pilasters and topped by an entablature and cornice. Balconies surround three sides of the interior and are supported by hand-hewn pillars. The original box pews are still in place, as is the original pulpit with a sounding board hung from the ceiling. The roof is supported by massive hand-hewn beams, measuring 14 to 18 inches (36 to 46 cm) in thickness.

The area that is now Alna was originally incorporated as part of a larger township called Pownalborough (now Dresden) in 1760. Organized as that town's North Precinct, it was incorporated as New Milford in 1794 and renamed Alna in 1811. This church was built in 1789, and saw active use until 1876.
