= Maine State Route 194 =

State highway in Maine, US

State Route 194

Route information
- Maintained by MaineDOT
- Length: 16.54 mi (26.62 km)
- Existed: 1925 (original route); 1951 (modern route)–present

Major junctions
- West end: SR 27 in Pittston
- SR 218 in Whitefield
- East end: SR 215 in North Newcastle

Location
- Country: United States
- State: Maine
- Counties: Kennebec, Lincoln

Highway system
- Maine State Highway System; Interstate; US; State; Auto trails; Lettered highways
← SR 193	→ I-195

State Route 194 (SR 194) is a numbered state highway in the U.S. state of Maine. The route runs 16.5 miles (26.6 km) from an intersection with SR 27 in Pittston to an intersection with SR 215 in North Newcastle, a village of Newcastle. The state route has one major junction with SR 218 in the town of Whitefield.

== History ==
SR 194 was designated in 1925 and originally ran from New England Interstate Route 24 (now U.S. Route 1) in Easton, a town in Aroostook County, and the Canadian border. In the 1930s, SR 194 was decommissioned, and the border crossing became one of the few in Maine to not have an assigned route number. After the original route was decommissioned, SR 194 was assigned to a short 3.0-mile (4.8 km) road located entirely in the town of Rockport. In 1948, SR 194 was decommissioned again when the road was designated part of the new SR 90. SR 194 was assigned to its current alignment in 1951.

== Junction list ==
County	Location	mi	km	Destinations	Notes
Kennebec	Pittston	0.00	0.00	SR 27 (Wiscasset Road) – Wiscasset, Gardiner	
Lincoln	Whitefield	8.26	13.29	SR 218 south (Wiscasset Road) – Wiscasset	Western end of SR 218 concurrency
Lincoln	Whitefield	8.36	13.45	SR 218 north (East River Road) – North Whitefield	Eastern end of SR 218 concurrency
Lincoln	Newcastle	16.54	26.62	SR 215 (Ridge Road / Jones Woods Road) – Newcastle, Jefferson	
1.000 mi = 1.609 km; 1.000 km = 0.621 mi: Concurrency terminus
