= Kennebec Central Railroad =

Overview
- Headquarters: Gardiner
- Locale: Maine
- Dates of operation: 1890–1929
- Successor: Abandoned

Technical
- Track gauge: 2 ft (610 mm)
- Length: 8 km (5.0 mi)

The Kennebec Central Railroad was a 2 ft (610 mm) narrow gauge railroad operating between Randolph and Togus, Maine. The railroad was built to offer transportation for American Civil War veterans living at Togus to the nearby City of Gardiner. Tracks of 25-pound steel rails ran five miles from Randolph, Maine (across the Kennebec River from Gardiner) to the veterans home at Togus. Train service began on 23 July 1890.

The Randolph terminal included a small, Queen Anne style station and a long set of stairs up to the covered bridge passengers used to reach Gardiner. Initial rolling stock was six flat cars and two box cars built by W.H.Dyer of Strong, Maine, two passenger coaches and a combination passenger-baggage car built by Jackson & Sharpe, and a 16-ton 0-4-4 Forney locomotive built by Baldwin Locomotive Works. Operational experience during the first summer encouraged purchase of two open, arch-roofed excursion cars from Jackson & Sharp to handle the crowds traveling during fair weather. Portland Company built a spare 18-ton 0-4-4 Forney to provide reliable service when one engine required repairs. The veterans at Togus gave a band concert on summer Sundays while other veterans played baseball games. Sunday and holiday passenger service filled all the coaches and excursion cars with local civilians enjoying a Sunday afternoon on the spacious grounds including a herd of deer.

The Kennebec Central had no rail connection with the outside world at Randolph. Coal was delivered by barges and schooners to a large government-owned coal shed between the Randolph yard and the Kennebec River. Coal was loaded onto flat cars for transport to a trestle feeding the Togus steam heating plant. Portland Company built two lowside gondolas in 1904 and three more in 1907 to help the railroad carry increasing quantities of coal needed to heat the expanding facility. These lowside gondolas had side gates to facilitate unloading on the coal trestle. Kennebec Central rebuilt three of the original flat cars with similar side gates in 1908. The two box cars handled small quantities of freight and were painted coach green to match the passenger equipment.

The railroad settled into a profitable routine of four round trips per day from Randolph to Togus and return with a couple of coal gondolas between the engine and the combination car. One of the excursion cars was rebuilt into a second combination car after availability of automobiles reduced the number of passengers. The railroad purchased a used 19-ton Portland Company 0-4-4T Forney from the Bridgton and Saco River Railroad when their first engine wore out in 1922 and purchased another used 18-ton Portland Company 0-4-4T Forney from the Sandy River and Rangeley Lakes Railroad to replace their second engine in 1926.

Operations were suspended abruptly on 29 June 1929 after the federal government awarded the coal-haul contract to a trucking firm. The locomotives were closed up in the two-stall Randolph enginehouse; and the cars waited on sidings for three years. Then a December 1931 enginehouse fire in Wiscasset damaged the locomotives of the nearby Wiscasset, Waterville and Farmington Railway. The owner of the Wiscasset railroad bought the whole Kennebec Central Railroad for less than it would have cost to repair his burned locomotives. Kennebec Central engines #3 and #4 were trucked to Wiscasset, repainted, and renumbered 8 and 9. Kennebec Central rails and car hardware became scrap metal. Some of the box car and passenger car bodies were sold as sheds, and the remainder floated down the Kennebec River in the 1936 flood.

== Locomotives ==
Name	Number	Builder	Type	Built	Acquired	Retired	Disposition	Notes
Volunteer	1	Baldwin Locomotive Works	0-4-4t	1890	1890	1922	Scrapped	
Veteran	2	The Portland Company	0-4-4t	12/1890	1890	1925	Scrapped	
	3	The Portland Company	0-4-4t	4/1892	1920	1929	Sold in 1933 to the Wiscasset, Waterville & Farmington #8	Purchased from the Birdgton & Saco River #3
	4	The Portland Company	0-4-4t	1891	1925	1929	Sold in 1933 to the Wiscasset, Waterville & Farmington #9	Purchased from the Sandy River & Rangeley Lakes #6. Originally Sandy River #5. Preserved at the Wiscasset, Waterville & Farmington Railway Museum.
