= Damariscotta Lake State Park =

State park in Lincoln County, Maine

- Location within Maine
- Interactive map of Damariscotta Lake State Park
- Location: Jefferson, Maine, United States
- Coordinates: 44°11′51″N 69°27′14″W
- Area: 19 acres (7.7 ha)
- Elevation: 56 ft (17 m)
- Established: 1970
- Visitors: 25,000 (in 2010)
- Administrator: Maine Department of Agriculture, Conservation and Forestry
- Website: Official website
- Maine State Parks

Damariscotta Lake State Park is a public recreation area located in the town of Jefferson, Lincoln County Maine. The park occupies 19 acres (7.7 ha) at the northeast corner of 10-mile-long (16 km) Damariscotta Lake. It is managed by the Maine Department of Agriculture, Conservation and Forestry.

== History ==
The park was created in 1970 and had 25,000 visitors in 2010. The park's original group shelter, which dated from 1976, was destroyed by arson in 2009. A replacement shelter was dedicated in 2011.

== Activities and amenities ==
The park features sandy beach, swimming, canoeing, picnicking facilities, and fishing.
