= Damariscotta-Newcastle, Maine =

- Former CDP
- Location in Maine Location in the United States
- Coordinates: 44°2′0″N 69°31′57″W
- Country: United States
- State: Maine
- County: Lincoln

Area
  - Total: 7.1 sq mi (18.4 km^{2})
  - Land: 5.6 sq mi (14.5 km^{2})
  - Water: 1.5 sq mi (3.9 km^{2})

Population (2000)
  - Total: 1,751
  - Density: 313/sq mi (120.7/km^{2})
- Time zone: UTC-5 (Eastern (EST))
  - Summer (DST): UTC-4 (EDT)
- Area code: 207
- FIPS code: 23-16322

Damariscotta-Newcastle was a census-designated place (CDP) in Lincoln County, Maine, United States. It designated a concentration of population around where the most developed portions of the towns of Damariscotta and Newcastle meet, generally corresponding to the "Twin Villages" area. As of the 2000 census, the CDP population was 1,751 (roughly half of the combined population of the two towns). For the 2010 census, the area was delineated as two separate CDPs, Damariscotta and Newcastle.

== Geography ==
Damariscotta-Newcastle is located at 44°2′0″N 69°31′57″W (44.033409, -69.532547).

According to the United States Census Bureau, the CDP had a total area of 7.1 square miles (18 km^{2}), of which 5.6 square miles (15 km^{2}) was land and 1.5 square miles (3.9 km^{2}), or 20.99%, was water.

== Demographics ==
As of the census of 2000, there were 1,751 people, 834 households, and 456 families residing in the CDP. The population density was 312.6 inhabitants per square mile (120.7/km^{2}). There were 938 housing units at an average density of 167.4 per square mile (64.6/km^{2}). The racial makeup of the CDP was 98.86% White, 0.11% African American, 0.11% Native American, 0.40% Asian, and 0.51% from two or more races. Hispanic or Latino of any race were 0.57% of the population.

There were 834 households, out of which 16.9% had children under the age of 18 living with them, 43.2% were married couples living together, 8.0% had a female householder with no husband present, and 45.3% were non-families. 40.3% of all households were made up of individuals, and 23.6% had someone living alone who was 65 years of age or older. The average household size was 1.96 and the average family size was 2.57.

In the CDP, the population was spread out, with 15.7% under the age of 18, 4.5% from 18 to 24, 17.5% from 25 to 44, 25.2% from 45 to 64, and 37.0% who were 65 years of age or older. The median age was 55 years. For every 100 females, there were 74.1 males. For every 100 females age 18 and over, there were 68.9 males.

The median income for a household in the CDP was $35,921, and the median income for a family was $51,250. Males had a median income of $32,375 versus $24,224 for females. The per capita income for the CDP was $23,697. About 6.1% of families and 11.4% of the population were below the poverty line, including 18.6% of those under age 18 and 6.8% of those age 65 or over.
