= Newcastle (CDP), Maine =

Newcastle, Maine
- Census-designated place
- Location in Lincoln County and the state of Maine
- Coordinates: 44°02′34″N 69°32′10″W
- Country: United States
- State: Maine
- County: Lincoln
- Town: Newcastle

Area
  - Total: 2.79 sq mi (7.23 km^{2})
  - Land: 2.17 sq mi (5.61 km^{2})
  - Water: 0.63 sq mi (1.62 km^{2})
- Elevation: 194 ft (59 m)

Population (2020)
  - Total: 660
  - Density: 304.5/sq mi (117.57/km^{2})
- Time zone: UTC-5 (Eastern (EST))
  - Summer (DST): UTC-4 (EDT)
- ZIP code: 04553
- Area code: 207
- FIPS code: 23-48610
- GNIS feature ID: 2583564
- Website: newcastlemaine.us

Newcastle is a census-designated place (CDP) comprising the main village of the town of Newcastle in Lincoln County, Maine, United States. The population was 667 at the 2010 census, out of 1,752 in the entire town. In the 2000 census, the village was part of the Damariscotta-Newcastle CDP.

== Geography ==
The Newcastle CDP is in the eastern part of the town of Newcastle in central Lincoln County. The CDP is on the west bank of the Damariscotta River, which forms the boundary with the town of Damariscotta. The CDP extends south down the river to a location north of Little Point, and north upriver and along Salt Bay to Damariscotta Mills and the outlet of Damariscotta Lake. Starting at its southern point on the Damariscotta River, the western boundary of the CDP follows Schrafft Road, River Road, an unnamed stream, a powerline, Old County Road, Kavanagh Road, Academy Road and Pond Road (Maine State Route 215) to Damariscotta Lake.

US Route 1 passes through the community, leading northeast 26 miles (42 km) to Rockland and southwest 18 miles (29 km) to Bath. Portland is 52 miles (84 km) to the southwest. U.S. Route 1 Business splits off US 1 to run through the centers of Newcastle and Damariscotta as Main Street. Maine Route 215 has its southern terminus at US 1 Business in Newcastle and leads north 16 miles (26 km) to ME 32 in the northern part of the town of Jefferson.

According to the United States Census Bureau, the Newcastle CDP has a total area of 2.8 square miles (7.2 km^{2}), of which 2.2 square miles (5.6 km^{2}) are land and 0.62 square miles (1.6 km^{2}), or 22.41%, are water.

== Demographics ==
Historical population
Census	Pop.	Note	%±
2020	660		—
U.S. Decennial Census
