= Maine State Route 218 =

State highway in Lincoln County, Maine, US

State Route 218

Route information
- Maintained by MaineDOT
- Length: 20.78 mi (33.44 km)

Major junctions
- South end: US 1 / SR 27 in Wiscasset
- North end: SR 17 / SR 32 in Whitefield

Location
- Country: United States
- State: Maine
- Counties: Lincoln

Highway system
- Maine State Highway System; Interstate; US; State; Auto trails; Lettered highways
| ← SR 216 | → SR 219 |

State Route 218 (SR 218) is a 21-mile-long (34 km) state highway in Lincoln County, Maine. The road connects U.S. Route 1 (US 1) and SR 27 at Wiscasset and SR 17/SR 32 in the town of Whitefield. Throughout its whole route, SR 218 parallels the Sheepscot River.

== Route description ==
SR 218 begins along Federal Street in Wiscasset, the county seat of Lincoln County. From Main Street (US 1/SR 27), it heads north past many houses, a cemetery, school, and a museum. After staying near the west side of the Sheepscot River through downtown Wiscasset, the river bends away from the road and the road starts to climb a small bluff near a stream. It enters the town of Alna and continues north through a mix of wooded areas and houses. At the settlement known as Alna Center, SR 218 passes the town hall and fire department. In this area, the road also passes various small farms. As the road approaches an east-west segment of the Sheepscot River, the road first descends from the ridge on which it traveled through Alna but then travels along the rolling bluffs lining the south side of the river. After passing under a power line corridor, the road enters the town of Whitefield. SR 218 strays further from the river at this point first passing a sand quarry but then returns to closely following it on top of a bluff. It descends a hill where at the bottom, reaches an intersection with SR 194.

SR 194 and SR 218 form a short concurrency to head north and cross the Sheepscot River near the town center of Whitefield. Shortly after the bridge, SR 194 heads off towards the east along Head Tide Road. SR 218 continues north on East River Road on the east side of the river passing some small farms along the way. At North Whitefield, the road reaches an intersection with SR 126. SR 218 heads west along SR 126 and climbs a small hill. Near the top of this hill, SR 218 breaks off of SR 126 and heads north along Mills Road. It first passes a general store/gas station then heads through an area containing houses, clearings, and woods. After passing a few farms, the road enters the community of Coopers Mills. At Rockland Road (SR 17/SR 32), SR 218 ends but the road continues north as Somerville Road.

== Major junctions ==
The entire route is in Lincoln County.

| Location | mi | km | Destinations | Notes |
|---|---|---|---|---|
| Wiscasset | 0.00 | 0.00 | US 1 / SR 27 (Main Street) / Fort Hill Street – Boothbay, Rockland, Bath | |
| Whitefield | 13.12 | 21.11 | SR 194 west (Pittston Road) | Southern end of SR 194 concurrency |
| Whitefield | 13.24 | 21.31 | SR 194 east (Head Tide Road) – Alna | Northern end of SR 194 concurrency |
| Whitefield | 17.61 | 28.34 | SR 126 east (Jefferson Road) – Jefferson | Southern end of SR 126 concurrency |
| Whitefield | 17.69 | 28.47 | SR 126 west (Grand Army Road) – Gardiner | Northern end of SR 126 concurrency |
| Whitefield | 20.78 | 33.44 | SR 17 / SR 32 (Rockland Road) / Somerville Road – Augusta, Waldoboro, Rockland | |
1.000 mi = 1.609 km; 1.000 km = 0.621 mi: Concurrency terminus
