= Sheepscot River =

River in the U.S. state of Maine

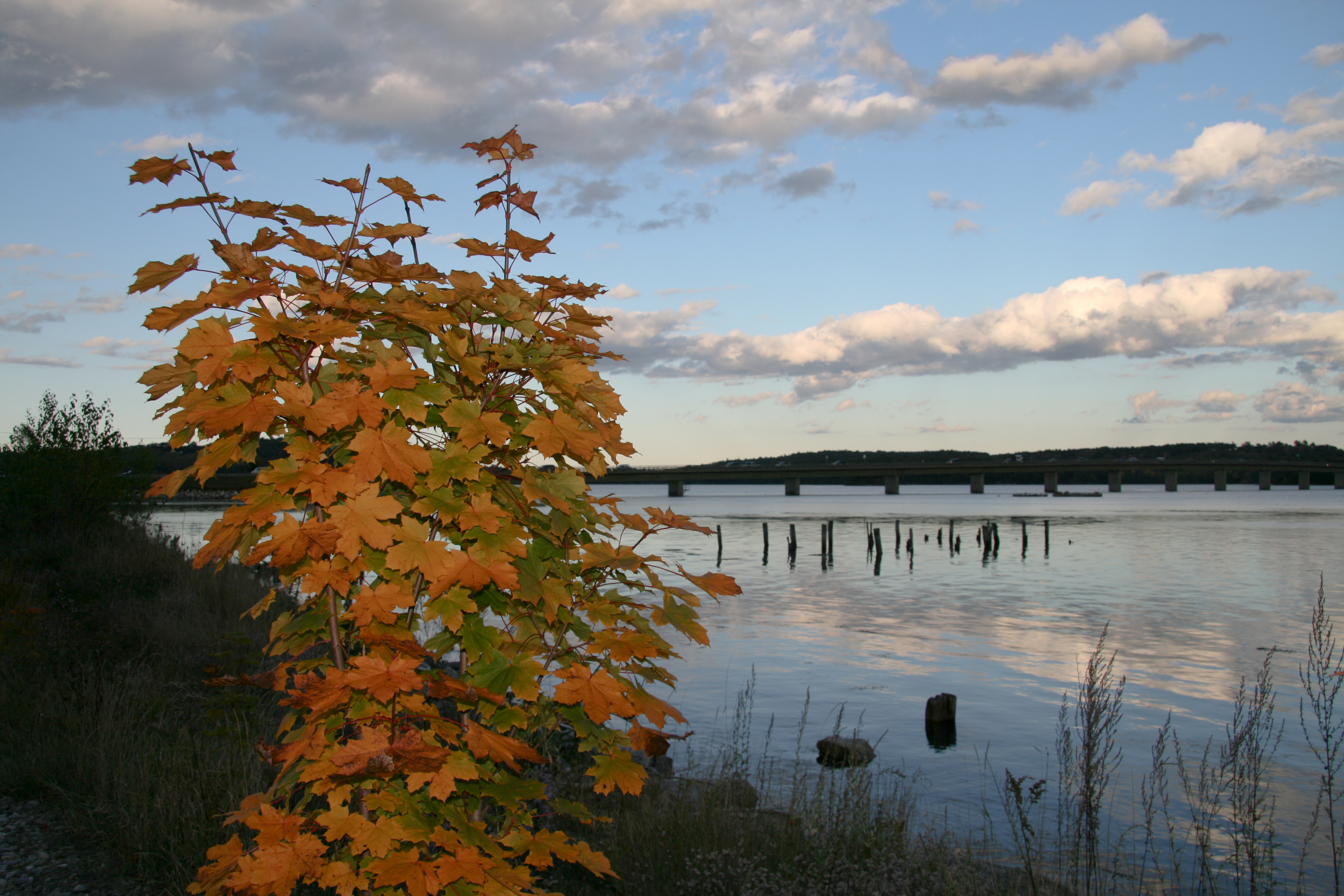
- Evening on the Sheepscot River

Location
- Country: United States

Physical characteristics
- Source
  - location: Freedom, Maine
  - coordinates: 44°29′22″N 69°18′40″W
  - elevation: 540 feet (160 m)
- Mouth
  - location: Gulf of Maine, Atlantic Ocean
  - coordinates: 43°48′10″N 69°42′0″W
  - elevation: sea level
- Length: 66 mi (106 km)

The Sheepscot River is a 66-mile-long (106 km) river in the U.S. state of Maine. Its lower portion is a complex island estuary with connections to the Kennebec River downstream of Merrymeeting Bay.

== Route ==
The Sheepscot River originates in Freedom (44°29′22″N 69°18′40″W) and flows southwesterly through Sheepscot Pond in Palermo and Long Pond in Somerville and Windsor. The river is bridged by Maine State Route 3 upstream of Sheepscot Pond and by Maine State Route 105 in Somerville between Sheepscot Pond and Long Pond. The river continues flowing southwesterly through the villages of Coopers Mills, North Whitefield, and Whitefield in the town of Whitefield. The river is bridged by concurrent Maine State Routes 17 and 32 at Coopers Mills. The West Branch Sheepscot River joins the main stem between Cooper's Mills and North Whitefield. The river is bridged by Maine State Route 126 at North Whitefield and by concurrent Maine State Routes 194 and 218 at Whitefield. The river flows south from Whitefield and becomes a tidal estuary at the village of Head Tide in Alna. The narrow gauge Wiscasset, Waterville and Farmington Railway closely followed the river through the town of Whitefield to Head Tide from 1895 until 1933 and bridged the river between the villages of Whitefield and Head Tide. At Wiscasset the estuary is bridged by the Maine Central Railroad Rockland Branch and by Davey Bridge, carrying U.S. Route 1. Sheepscot Bay is navigable for a distance of approximately 15 miles (24 km) from Wiscasset to the mouth between Reid State Park and Southport Island.

== Estuary ==
The lower estuary is defined by large islands. The estuary is split by Westport Island. The channel east of Westport Island is considered the Sheepscot River, while the western channel is identified as the Back River. The Back River is crossed in Hockomock Bay by a tidal channel identified as the Sasanoa River. The Sasanoa River connects the Kennebec River estuary at Woolwich with the Sheepscot River estuary between Westport Island and Georgetown Island. Georgetown Island forms the west side of the mouth of Sheepscot Bay and the east side of the mouth of the Kennebec River estuary. The Back River reaches the Kennebec River on the west side of Georgetown Island. Arrowsic Island forms the east side of the Kennebec River estuary between the Sasanoa River and the Back River. Maine State Route 144 bridges the Back River from Wiscasset to Westport Island. Maine State Route 127 bridges the Sasanoa River from Woolwich to Arrowsic Island and the Back River from Arrowsic Island to Georgetown Island.

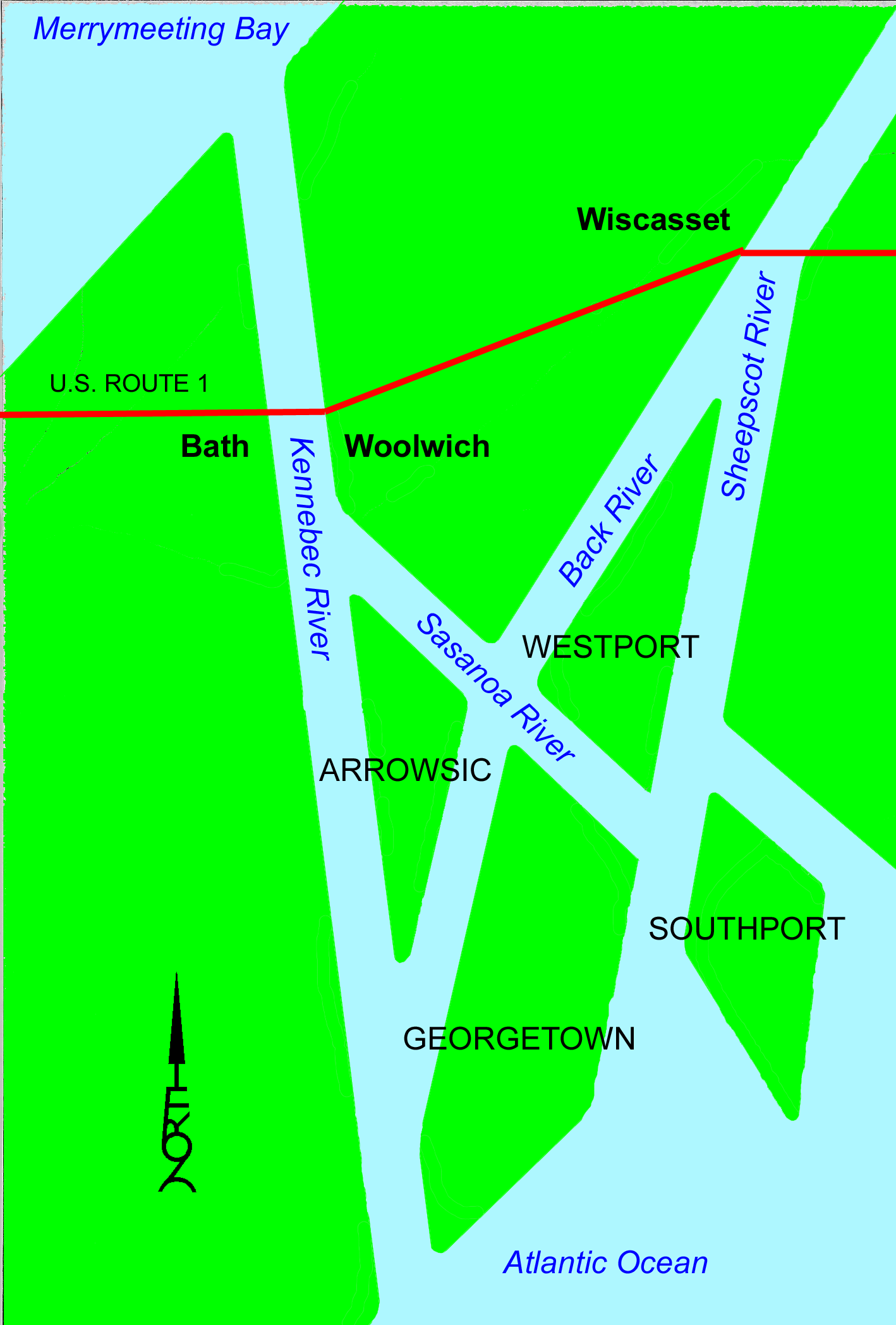
Schematic map of estuary.

== Smaller islands of the estuary ==
The Sheepscot River portion of the estuary includes the following named islands:

- Barters Island
- Boston Island
- Crow Island
- Davis Island
- Fox Island
- Green Island
- Hen Island
- Hodgdon Island
- Indiantown Island
- Isle of Springs
- MacMahan Island
- Malden Island
- Lower Mark Island
- Upper Mark Island
- Merrow Island
- Miles Island
- Mink Island
- Pratts Island
- Ram Island
- Sawyer Island
- Spectacle Island
- Tibbet Island
- Turnip Island
- Whittum Island
- Wood Island

== Restoration ==
In 2018, the Coopers Mill Dam was removed from the Sheepscot River. During the summer and fall of 2019, the Head Tide Dam near Alna was partially breached to allow easier passage for various fish species. A pedestrian overlook was constructed in late 2019 on the re-configured Head Tide Dam. This overlook will allow locals, visitors, and tourists to access the continued restoration of the lower portions of the Sheepscot. Alewives, herring, Atlantic salmon, and resident trout species will assuredly benefit from these restoration efforts.

== See also ==
- List of rivers of Maine
