= Maine State Route 32 =

State highway in Maine, US

State Route 32

Route information
- Maintained by MaineDOT
- Length: 58.39 mi (93.97 km)
- Existed: c. 1937–present

Major junctions
- South end: SR 130 in Bristol
- US 1 in Waldoboro; US 202 / SR 3 / SR 9 in China
- North end: US 201 / SR 100 / SR 137 Bus. in Winslow

Location
- Country: United States
- State: Maine
- Counties: Lincoln, Kennebec

Highway system
- Maine State Highway System; Interstate; US; State; Auto trails; Lettered highways
← SR 27	→ SR 35

State Route 32 (abbreviated SR 32) is part of Maine's system of numbered state highways, located in the southern coastal part of the state. It runs 58.39 miles (93.97 km) from an intersection with SR 130 in Bristol north to Windsor where it ends at U.S. Route 202 (US 202), SR 100, and SR 137 Business.

== Route description ==
SR 32 begins at an intersection with SR 130 about three miles (4.8 km) north of Pemaquid Point (the southernmost point of Bristol and SR 130). The route meanders north for almost 20 miles (32 km), through the eastern side of town, along Muscongus Bay, and through the small town of Bremen without any major intersections. SR 32 enters the town of Waldoboro where it crosses US 1 before heading northwest to Jefferson. In the town center SR 32 intersects and briefly overlaps with SR 126. SR 32 also overlaps with SR 17 and both routes cross into Windsor, immediately intersecting with SR 218. SR 32 and SR 17 continue west for just over three miles before SR 32 splits off to the north and meets SR 105 in the town center. SR 32 continues due north for another six miles into the southwestern corner of China, where it intersects with the Augusta-Belfast Road (US 202 / SR 3 / SR 9). SR 32 joins the multiplexed routes for 1.3 miles before again turning north. The highway continues for another ten miles into Winslow, crossing over SR 137 and briefly joining SR 137 Business before terminating at US 201 / SR 100 at the confluence of the Sebasticook and Kennebec Rivers at Winslow.

== History ==
SR 32 has maintained its current alignment from Bristol to Winslow since it was designated in the late 1930s. Its route from Bristol to Waldoboro was entirely new, while the rest of the route replaced older designations.

SR 32 originally continued north along the Sebasticook River to Benton, ending at SR 11/SR 139, but was truncated to its current northern terminus in 1954. The orphaned northern alignment was considered to be an alternate to SR 100 (which predated US 202) and was designated SR 100A.

== Major intersections ==
County	Location	mi	km	Destinations	Notes
Lincoln	Bristol	0.0	0.0	SR 130 (Bristol Road) – Pemaquid Point, Bristol	
Lincoln	Waldoboro	19.6	31.5	US 1 (Atlantic Highway) to SR 220 / SR 235 – Newcastle, Rockland	
Lincoln	Jefferson	28.1	45.2	SR 126 east (Washington Road) – Jefferson	Eastern terminus of SR 126 concurrency
Lincoln	Jefferson	29.2	47.0	SR 126 west (Bunker Hill Road) to SR 213 – Whitefield, Damariscotta	Western terminus of SR 126 concurrency
Lincoln	Jefferson	32.9	52.9	SR 215 south (North Clery Road) – Newcastle	Northern terminus of SR 215
Lincoln	Jefferson	33.9	54.6	SR 17 south (Rockland Road) – Somerville, Rockland	Southern terminus of SR 17 concurrency
Lincoln	Whitefield	34.3	55.2	SR 218 south (Mills Road) – Whitefield	Northern terminus of SR 218
Kennebec	Windsor	37.4	60.2	SR 17 north (Augusta-Rockland Road) – Augusta	Northern terminus of SR 17 concurrency
Kennebec	Windsor	39.9	64.2	SR 105 (South Belfast Road) – Augusta, Washington	
Kennebec	China	46.0	74.0	US 202 / SR 3 / SR 9 east – China, Hampden	Eastern terminus of US 202 / SR 3 / SR 9 concurrency
Kennebec	China	47.2	76.0	US 202 / SR 3 / SR 9 west – Augusta	Western terminus of US 202 / SR 3 / SR 9 concurrency
Kennebec	Winslow	57.7	92.9	SR 137 (Carter Memorial Drive) – Waterville	
Kennebec	Winslow	58.3	93.8	SR 137 Bus. (China Road)	Southern terminus of SR 137 Bus. concurrency
Kennebec	Winslow	58.4	94.0	US 201 / SR 100 / SR 137 Bus. (Augusta Road) to SR 100A	Northern terminus of SR 137 Bus. concurrency
1.000 mi = 1.609 km; 1.000 km = 0.621 mi: Concurrency terminus
