= Damariscotta Lake =

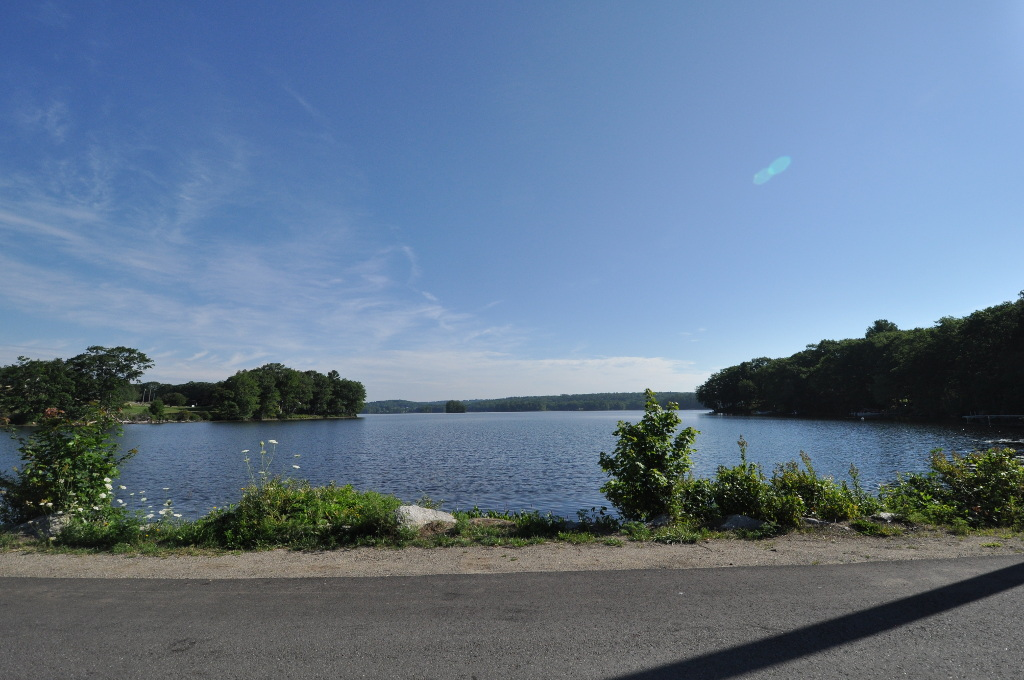
- View of Damariscotta Lake in Nobleboro, Maine

- Location within Maine
- Location: Lincoln County, Maine
- Coordinates: 44.147°N 69.486°W
- Type: Lake
- Primary outflows: Damariscotta River
- Max. length: 10 miles (16 km)
- Max. width: 1.9 miles (3.1 km)
- Surface area: 4,381 acres (1,773 ha)
- Average depth: 30 feet (9.1 m)
- Max. depth: 114 feet (35 m)
- Shore length^{1}: 21.4 miles (34.4 km)
- Surface elevation: 52 feet (16 m)
- Islands: Spectacle Islands
- ^{1} Shore length is not a well-defined measure.

Damariscotta Lake is a lake in Lincoln County, Maine. Damariscota Lake, which covers 4,300 acres (1,700 ha), encompasses part of the towns of Jefferson, Nobleboro, and Newcastle. Damariscotta Lake State Park in Jefferson occupies 19 acres at the far northern end of the lake. The lake is known for its annual run of alewives and the dam and fish ladder built in 1807 at Damariscotta Mills at the lake's southern tip.
