= Waldoboro (CDP), Maine =

Waldoboro, Maine
- Census-designated place
- Location in Lincoln County and the state of Maine
- Coordinates: 44°05′21″N 69°22′12″W
- Country: United States
- State: Maine
- County: Lincoln
- Town: Waldoboro

Area
  - Total: 5.80 sq mi (15.01 km^{2})
  - Land: 5.39 sq mi (13.97 km^{2})
  - Water: 0.40 sq mi (1.04 km^{2})
- Elevation: 0 ft (0 m)

Population (2020)
  - Total: 1,300
  - Density: 240.9/sq mi (93.03/km^{2})
- Time zone: UTC-5 (Eastern (EST))
  - Summer (DST): UTC-4 (EDT)
- ZIP code: 04572
- Area code: 207
- FIPS code: 23-79515
- GNIS feature ID: 2377965

Waldoboro is a census-designated place (CDP) comprising the central village in the town of Waldoboro in Lincoln County, Maine, United States. The population was 1,300 at the 2020 census, out of 5,075 people in the entire town of Waldoboro.

== Geography ==
The CDP is located in the south-central part of the town of Waldoboro in eastern Lincoln County. The CDP includes all of the primary village of Waldoboro, on both sides of the Medomak River, as well as part of the village of West Waldoboro. The CDP extends southwest down the Medomak as far as Meetinghouse Cove, from which point the western boundary of the CDP follows Dutch Neck Road and Bremen Road (Maine State Route 32) north to the German Cemetery, then leads northwest to the junction of Main Street and U.S. Route 1. The western boundary continues east along US 1 to ME 32, angles west to include The Hill Road, then returns to ME 32, following it north to Cross Street at Winslows Mills, the northernmost extent of the CDP. The eastern edge of the CDP follows Depot Street southeastward from Cross Street, then a powerline east to Maine State Route 220 at Hahn Road. From there, the CDP boundary runs south down Back Brook and Slaigo Brook to Route 220 just north of Sampson Cove on the Medomak River. The border then runs northwest along Route 220 to an unnamed driveway that leads west down to the Medomak.

U.S. Route 1 passes through the northern part of the community, leading east (northbound) 11 miles (18 km) to Thomaston and southwest 10 miles (16 km) to Damariscotta. Maine State Route 220 passes through the center of Waldoboro, leading north 23 miles (37 km) to Liberty and south 9 miles (14 km) to Friendship. Maine State Route 32 runs through the western side of the community, leading north 9 miles (14 km) to Jefferson and southwest 18 miles (29 km) to New Harbor.

According to the United States Census Bureau, the Waldoboro CDP has a total area of 5.8 square miles (15.0 km^{2}), of which 5.4 square miles (14.0 km^{2}) are land and 0.39 square miles (1.0 km^{2}), or 6.90%, is water. The Medomak River runs through the center of the village, where it reaches tidewater and continues south as an arm of Muscongus Bay, part of the Gulf of Maine and the Atlantic Ocean.

The bedrock geology of the area has been mapped by William C. Sidle in 1991. A minute degree of contamination was found due to naturally occurring mercury.

== Demographics ==
Historical population
Census	Pop.	Note	%±
2020	1,300		—
U.S. Decennial Census

As of the census of 2000, there were 1,291 people, 585 households, and 329 families residing in the CDP. The population density was 264.0 inhabitants per square mile (101.9/km^{2}). There were 674 housing units at an average density of 137.8 per square mile (53.2/km^{2}). The racial makeup of the CDP was 98.53% White, 0.08% Black or African American, 0.08% Native American, 0.70% Asian, and 0.62% from two or more races. Hispanic or Latino of any race were 0.39% of the population.

There were 585 households, out of which 23.8% had children under the age of 18 living with them, 41.7% were married couples living together, 12.1% had a female householder with no husband present, and 43.6% were non-families. 36.4% of all households were made up of individuals, and 18.5% had someone living alone who was 65 years of age or older. The average household size was 2.11 and the average family size was 2.72.

In the CDP, the population was spread out, with 21.1% under the age of 18, 6.3% from 18 to 24, 21.1% from 25 to 44, 25.5% from 45 to 64, and 26.0% who were 65 years of age or older. The median age was 46 years. For every 100 females, there were 83.4 males. For every 100 females age 18 and over, there were 75.2 males.

The median income for a household in the CDP was $25,682, and the median income for a family was $36,645. Males had a median income of $27,500 versus $21,979 for females. The per capita income for the CDP was $20,249. About 13.3% of families and 17.3% of the population were below the poverty line, including 23.0% of those under age 18 and 15.4% of those age 65 or over.
