= Wiscasset, Waterville and Farmington Railway =

Railway in Maine, USA

Coordinates: 44.0603°N 69.6238°W

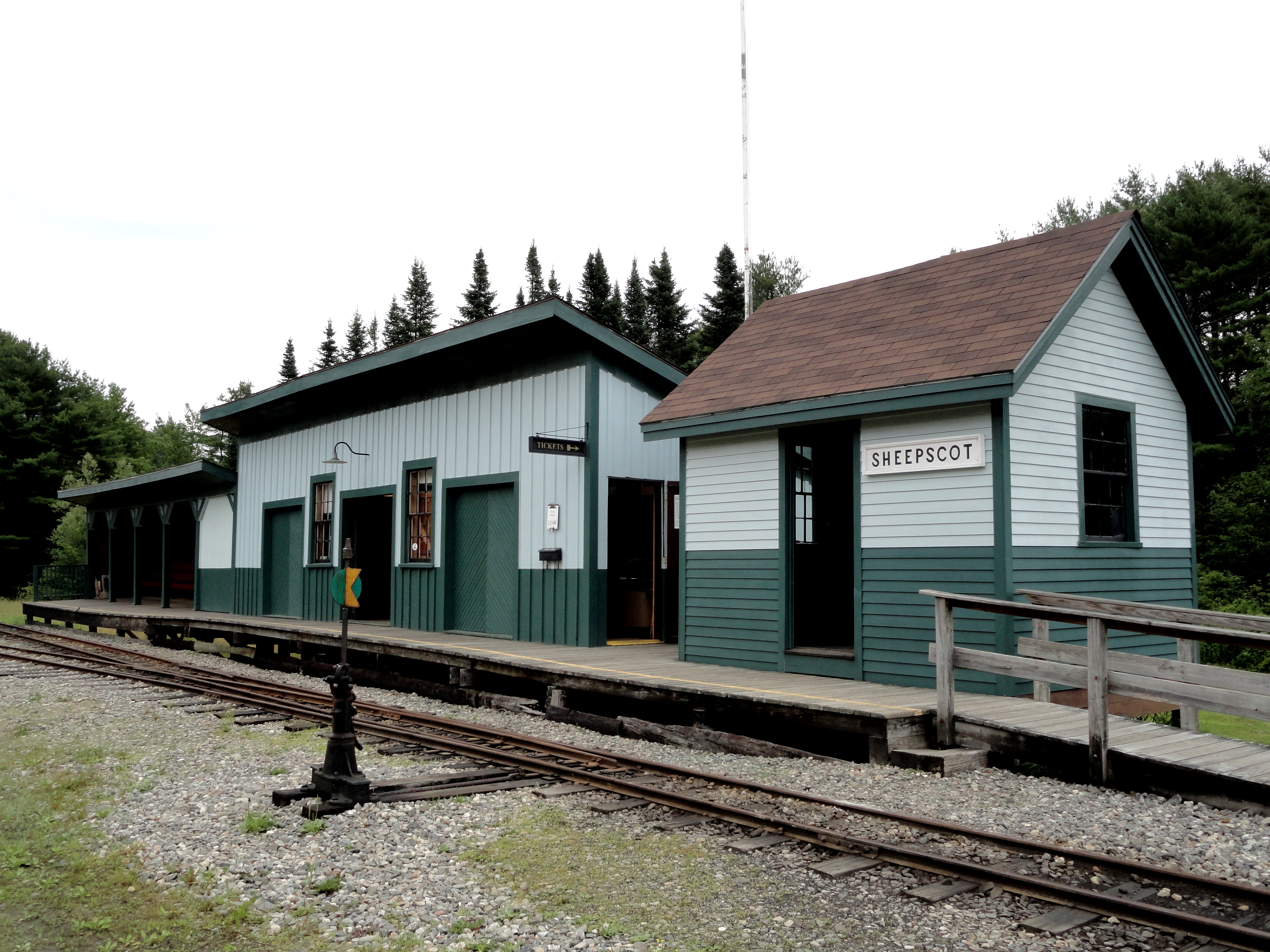
- The WW&FR depot on July 20, 2014

Overview
- Headquarters: Wiscasset, Maine
- Reporting mark: WW&FR
- Locale: Alna, Maine
- Dates of operation: 1895–1933; 1989–present

Technical
- Track gauge: 2 ft (610 mm)
- Length: 3.5 miles (5.6 km)

Other
- Website: http://www.wwfry.org

The Wiscasset, Waterville and Farmington Railway (reporting mark WW&FR) is a 2 ft (610 mm) narrow gauge railway. The line was operated as a for-profit company from 1895 until 1933 between the Maine towns of Wiscasset, Albion, and Winslow, but was abandoned in 1936. Today 3.5 miles (5.6 km) of the track in the town of Alna has been rebuilt and is operated by the non-profit Wiscasset, Waterville and Farmington Railway Museum as a heritage railroad offering passenger excursion trains and hauling occasional cargo.

== History ==
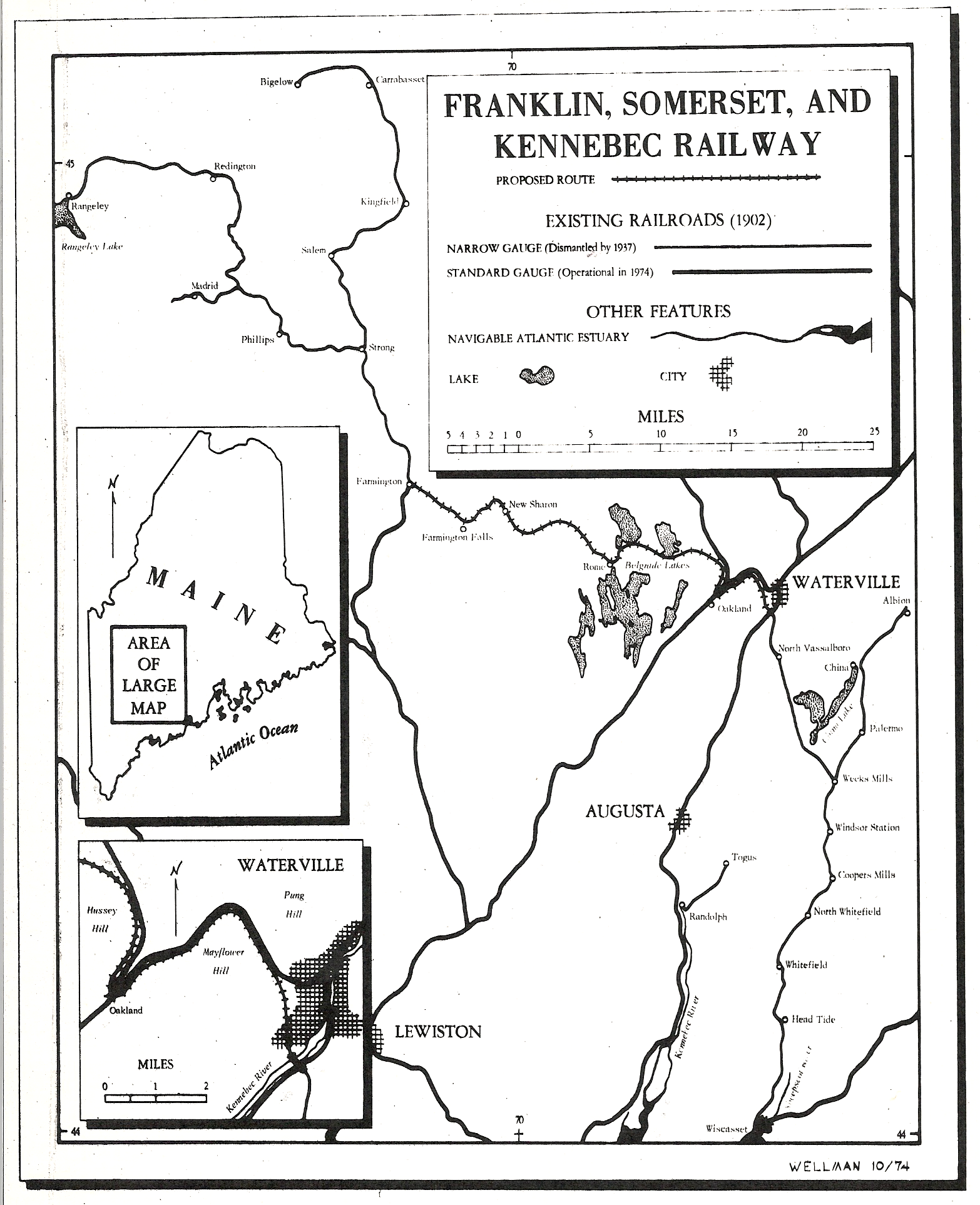
Map of a proposed 2 ft (610 mm) gauge railroad that would have linked the WW&F with the Sandy River Railroad. The Franklin, Somerset and Kennebec Railway was chartered in 1897; construction began in 1901 on the northern portion of the line from Farmington to New Sharon. The line was never completed because the Maine Central Railroad objected to a connection between the two narrow gauge lines on their property in Farmington.

The line began operating to Weeks Mills on February 20, 1895, as the Wiscasset and Quebec Railroad. The line was reorganized in 1901 as the Wiscasset, Waterville and Farmington Railway following the inability to negotiate a crossing of the Belfast and Moosehead Lake Railroad near Burnham Junction. The reorganized WW&F completed a branch line from Weeks Mills to the Kennebec River at Winslow but failed to negotiate a connection with the Sandy River Railroad at Farmington, and therefore never reached Quebec.

The WW&F hauled potatoes, lumber, and poultry along with other general freight and passengers. Freight tonnage in 1914 was 43% outbound lumber, 16% outbound potatoes and canned corn, 14% inbound feed and grain, 10% inbound manufactured goods, 5% inbound coal, and 4% outbound hay.

In the late 1920s, the railroad began to struggle, thanks to competition from roads. It was purchased by Frank Winter, a businessman with lumber interests in Palermo. He had also bought two cargo schooners, which he proposed would carry coal north from Boston and return south with lumber, while the railroad would transport coal and lumber between Wiscasset and interior points in Maine. On June 15, 1933, as a result of a locomotive derailment, operations ceased and this business venture never came to fruition. Winter died in 1936. Most of the railroad was scrapped, while the schooners were abandoned beside the railroad wharf in Wiscasset.

=== Wiscasset, Waterville & Farmington Railway Museum ===
Beginning in 1989, a non-profit organization established the WW&F Railway Museum, which continues to operate as of 2026. It restored several privately owned pieces of former WW&F rolling stock and runs 3.5 miles of former WW&F track in Alna. The museum runs 2 ft (610 mm) gauge steam and diesel locomotives and other historic equipment, and has other pieces on static display.

On July 13, 2021, construction began on a new three-stall roundhouse to store the museum's locomotives, based on the original engine house used by the railroad in the 1930s. Work was completed on July 21, 2024 and has been dubbed as "Morse Engine House" in honor of longtime WW&F volunteer Frederick Morse.

On August 2, 2022, the railroad completed a 0.75 to 1 mile stretch of track to State Route 218, with a new built turntable and station at the end of the line. The extended track officially opened on August 6 and seven days later, the first inaugural passenger train ran on the mountain extension track to Troutbrook Station for the first time since 1933.

In December 2025, the museum announced that they plan to extend their track southward to the town of Wiscasset. A second station is also planned to be built at the end of the southwest track when completed. Fundraising began in 2026 and constructed is scheduled to began in either 2027 or 2028.

== Main Line geography 1895–1933 ==
Milepost 0: Wiscasset - Transfer yard largely built on pilings over the Sheepscot River estuary including a wharf, passing siding, interchange tracks with the standard gauge Maine Central Railroad and spurs serving a creamery and a grain warehouse. North of the transfer yard was the diamond crossing of the Maine Central Railroad with a wooden platform connecting separate station buildings for the two railroads. A 3-stall enginehouse and turntable, a long coal shed, a large 3-track car shop, two storage sidings, and a water tank were north of the Maine Central diamond.

Milepost 4.8: Sheepscot - Small agent's station building with a northbound spur.

Milepost 6.4: Alna Centre - Small flag stop passenger shelter.

"Top of Mountain" was a southbound spur atop the uphill grade from Head Tide to Alna

Milepost 9.1: Head Tide - Agent's station building of standard design with 2 southbound spurs. Some distance north of the station a third southbound spur served a gravel pit. A covered water tank was north of the gravel pit.

Milepost 12.3: "Iron Bridge" The most impressive bridge on the line carried the rails over the Sheepscot River. The railroad was within a relatively steeply incised portion of the Sheepscot River valley between Head Tide and Whitefield. The through truss bridge had previously been used as part of an early Maine Central Railroad bridge over the Kennebec River at Waterville, Maine.

Milepost 13.3: Whitefield - Agent's station building of standard design with a passing siding.

Milepost 15.7: Prebles - Small flag stop passenger shelter.

Milepost 17.4: North Whitefield - Agent's station building of standard design with a southbound spur serving a potato warehouse. A short distance north of the station, a second southbound spur served Clary's mill.

Milepost 20.4: Cooper's Mills - Agent's station with a passing siding and a southbound spur serving a potato warehouse. The original station was a covered design with doors at either end to allow the train to pass through; but this was replaced in the early 1900s with a newer design similar to those constructed on the Winslow branch. There was a covered water tank south of the station.

Milepost 23: Maxcy's - Small flag stop passenger shelter with a southbound spur.

Milepost 24: Windsor - Agent's station building of standard design with a southbound spur.

Milepost 28.2: Weeks Mills - Agent's station building of standard design with a separate shed-roofed freight house, a covered water tank, one or two passing sidings, a wye for the branch to Winslow, and two southbound spurs for a potato warehouse and a cannery.

Milepost 31: Newell's - Small flag stop passenger shelter with a southbound spur.

Milepost 32.9: Palermo - Agent's station building of standard design with a passing siding and a southbound spur serving a potato warehouse. Some distance north of Palermo was a covered water tank, a southbound spur serving a gravel pit, and, in later years, a northbound spur serving a sawmill owned by the last operator of the railroad.

Milepost 36.5: Cole's - Flag stop.

Milepost 38: China - Agent's station building of standard design with a southbound spur serving a potato warehouse.

Milepost 40: South Albion - Small flag stop passenger shelter.

Milepost 43.5: Albion - Agent's station building of standard design was subsequently modified to add a second story with living quarters. Several southbound spurs served a cannery, a sawmill, a tannery, and two potato warehouses. A turntable and single-stall enginehouse were near the station, and there was a covered water tank about a half-mile south of the station.

== Branch Line geography 1902–1916 ==
Milepost 31.5: South China - Agent's station building of newer design with a northbound spur serving a potato warehouse. There was a covered water tank about one-quarter mile south of the station.

Milepost 32.5: China Lake - Flag stop.

Milepost 33.7: Clark's - Flag stop.

Milepost 36.5: East Vassalboro - Agent's station building of newer design with a northbound spur.

Milepost 39.1: North Vassalboro - Agent's station building of newer design with a southbound spur. A northbound spur served a gravel pit south of the station. Three southbound spurs served an American Woolen Company mill north of the station; and there was a covered water tank north of the woolen mill.

Milepost 42.7: Winslow - Agent's station building of newer design with a southbound spur. There was also a turntable and enginehouse for the decade this point served as the primary northern terminus of the railroad. Rails were removed from the Winslow end of the branch in 1912, but the railroad provided freight service as far as North Vassalboro for a few more years.

== Equipment ==
=== Locomotives ===
Locomotives details
Number	Image	Type	Model	Built	Builder	Status
4		Railcar	Model T Ford	2007–2010	Leon Weeks	Operational
9		Steam	0-4-4RT	1891	Portland Company	Operational
10		Steam	0-4-4RT	1904	Vulcan Iron Works	Under restoration
11		Steam	2-4-4RT	2017–present	Wiscasset, Waterville and Farmington Railway	Under construction
51		Track car	Unknown	1947	Brookville	Operational
52		Diesel	DDT-6 12 ton-switcher	1962	Plymouth Locomotive Works	Operational
53		Diesel	45-ton switcher	1941	General Electric	Stored, out of service

=== Visiting locomotives ===
Locomotives details
Number	Image	Type	Model	Built	Builder	Works number	Status	Owner	Notes
3	Frameless	Steam	0-4-4RT	1912	Vulcan Iron Works	2093	Operational	Maine Narrow Gauge Railroad Museum	In service at Edaville
4	Frameless	Steam	0-4-4RT	1918	Vulcan Iron Works	2780	Dissassembled, awaiting overhaul	Maine Narrow Gauge Railroad Museum	
7		Steam	2-4-4RT	1913	Baldwin Locomotive Works	40864	Operational	Maine Narrow Gauge Railroad Museum	In service at Maine Narrow Gauge
8	Frameless	Steam	2-4-4RT	1924	Baldwin Locomotive Works	57659	Stored, awaiting restoration	Maine Narrow Gauge Railroad Museum	
11		Steam	0-4-0	1925	HK Porter	6976	Operational	Maine Locomotive & Machine Works	On loan from Maine Locomotive & Machine Works

=== Former units ===
Former locomotives
Number	Image	Type	Model	Built	Builder	Works number	Notes
1		Steam	0-4-4RT	1883	HK Porter	565	Scrapped in 1916
2		Steam	0-4-4RT	1894	Portland Company	626	Scrapped in 1937
3		Steam	0-4-4RT	1894	Portland Company	627	Scrapped in 1937
4		Steam	0-4-4RT	1902	HK Porter	2497	Scrapped in 1937
5		Steam	0-4-4RT	1882	Hinkley Locomotive Works	1564	Scrapped in 1912
6		Steam	2-6-2	1907	Baldwin Locomotive Works	31691	Scrapped in 1937
7		Steam	2-4-4RT	1907	Baldwin Locomotive Works	31692	Scrapped in 1937
8		Steam	0-4-4RT	1892	Portland Company	624	Scrapped in 1937

=== Rolling stock ===
Construction started with a Porter 14-ton 0-4-4T Forney locomotive originally built for the Sandy River Railroad in 1883. During construction, Portland Company provided the railroad with a number of 10-ton capacity cars 28 ft (8.5 m) long. They were flat cars #1–20, box cars #21-25, caboose #26, lowside coal gondolas #27–30, and box cars #31–36. The Portland Company also built a wedge snowplow, a flanger, and two 19-ton 0-4-4T Forney locomotives #2–3. Jackson & Sharp built four passenger cars 40 ft (12 m) long. These were clerestory-roofed baggage-express-RPO #1, clerestory-roofed coaches #2–3, and arch-roofed coach #4 designated a smoking car.

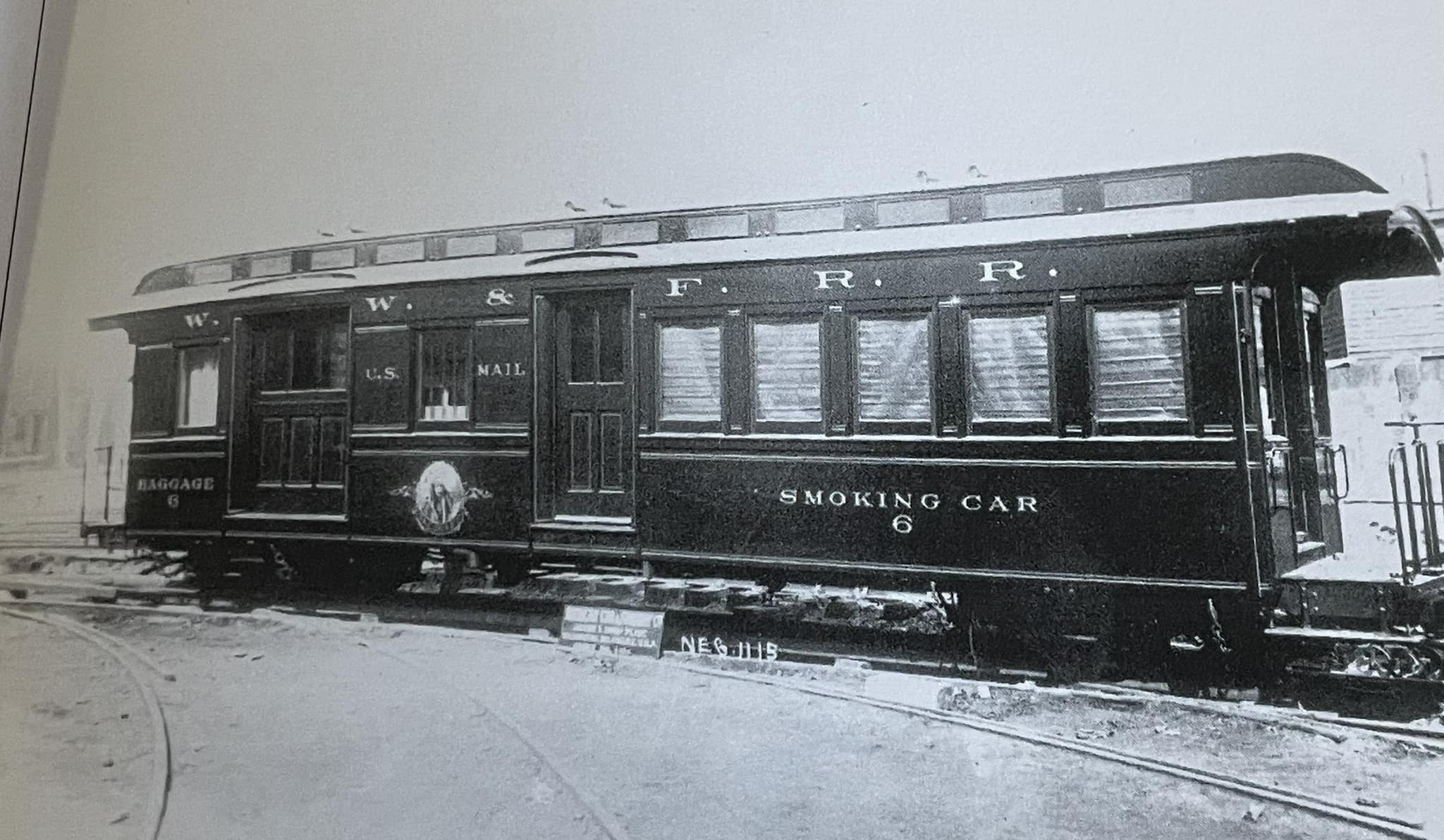
Triple-Combination Coach called 'Taconet' of the Wiscasset, Waterville and Farmington Railway built by Jackson & Sharpe company of Wilmington, Delaware in 1901 as a smoking car, and for baggage and mail

Portland Company built 32 more cars when the railroad reorganized for construction to Winslow. These cars were 30 ft (9.1 m) long and had a capacity of 12 tons. Coal gondolas were numbered 101–105 and flatcars were numbered 38, 40, 42, 44, 46, and 48-58. Boxcars #33, 35, 37, 39, 41 and 43 were the same height as the original box cars, with door width expanded from 4 ft (1.2 m) to 5 ft (1.5 m). Boxcars #60–64 were about 1 ft (0.30 m) taller than the earlier boxcars. Porter built 24-ton 0-4-4T Forney locomotive #4 and Jackson & Sharpe built three clerestory-roofed passenger cars 32 ft (9.8 m) long. These were coach #5, baggage-RPO-smoking car #6, and open excursion car #7.

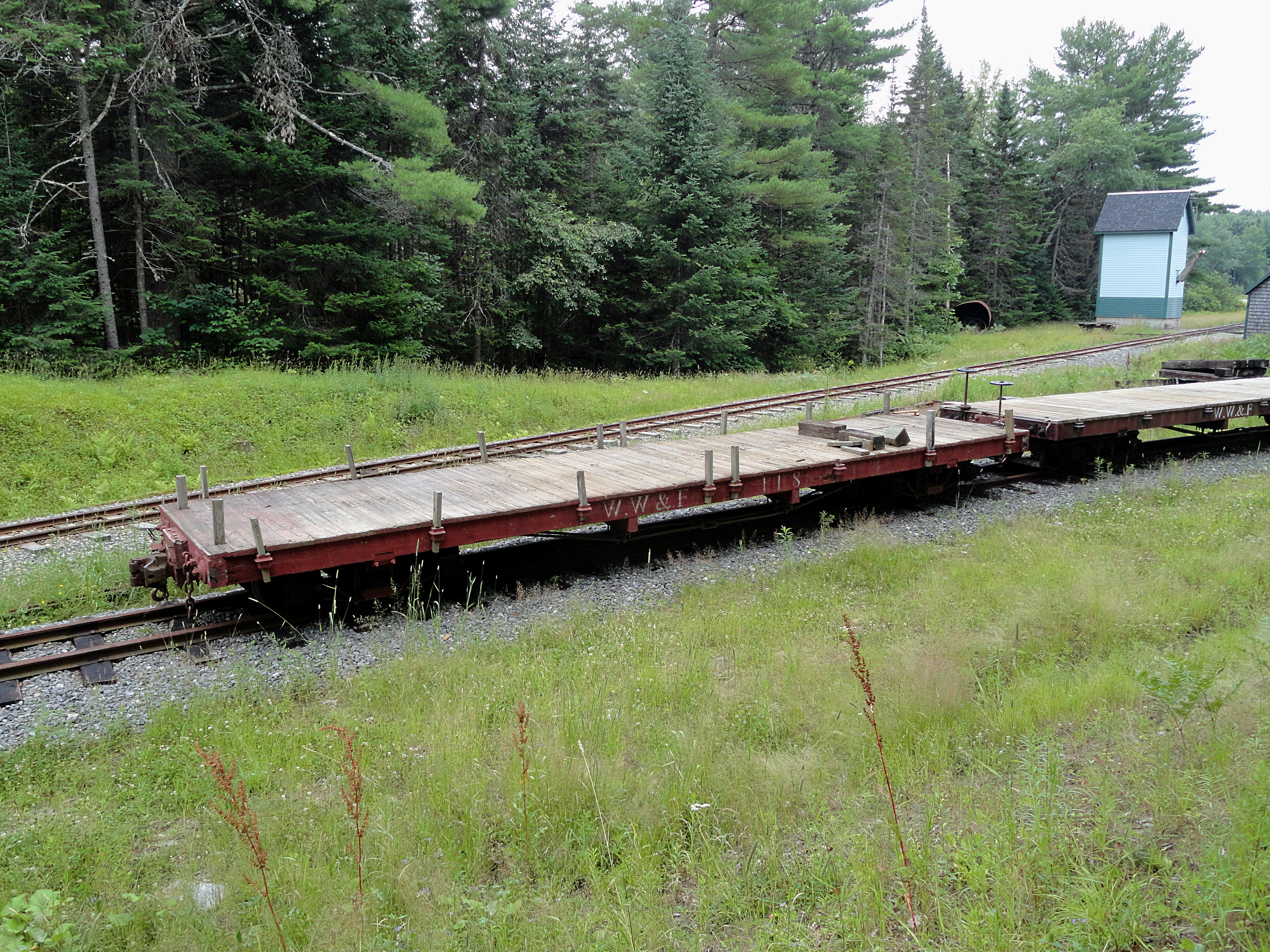
Flatcar #118, the only original surviving flatcar

Portland Company built 32 more cars before World War I. Wedge snowplow #402 and flanger #202 were built in 1905. Boxcars #65–74 were built in 1906. Flatcars #106–115 were built in 1907 and #116–125 were built in 1912. All except the snowplow were on the heavy 30 ft (9.1 m) underframe.

Carson Peck purchased three locomotives in 1907. No. 5 was a 15-ton 0-4-4T Forney built by Hinkley for the Bridgton & Saco River Railroad in 1882. Baldwin #6 was a 26-ton 2-6-2 and #7 was a 28-ton 2-4-4T Forney. These two new outside-frame Baldwin engines moved most main-line trains until they were damaged in the 1931 Wiscasset enginehouse fire. Frank Winter then purchased two used locomotives from the discontinued Kennebec Central Railroad to keep the Wiscasset railroad operating. Portland #8 was a 19-ton 0-4-4T Forney built for the Bridgton & Saco River Railroad in 1892 and Portland #9 was an 18-ton 0-4-4T Forney built for the Sandy River Railroad in 1891.

The Wiscasset car shop completed a number of rebuilding projects starting with the conversion of six of the original flatcars to boxcars during the first year of railroad operations. The shop then rebuilt one end of smoking car #4 into a baggage compartment. After the smoking car burst into flame in 1904, its trucks were used under the caboose. The caboose was renumbered from 26 to 301 after its cupola was removed. Excursion car #7 was converted to a replacement combination RPO-smoking car in 1906. The 28 ft (8.5 m) gondolas were rebuilt as flatcars when the 30 ft (9.1 m) gondolas were delivered, and the 30 ft (9.1 m) gondolas were rebuilt as simple flatcars within a year. Box cars #65, 72 and 73 were rebuilt with hinged doors, insulated walls, and 2 windows for use as cream cars carrying an attendant to load and record milk cans. As the 28 ft (8.5 m) boxcars needed repair, they were rebuilt to the full height of the 30 ft (9.1 m) boxcars and renumbered in the 300 series with special-purpose modifications. Cars #302-304 had end doors and six windows on each side for use as express cars in passenger train service. Many later cars of the 300 series contained stoves to keep potatoes from freezing during winter shipment. Ten of the 28 ft (8.5 m) flatcars were rebuilt in 1910 as heated insulated boxcars #501–510 for potato loading. Boxcar #509 was rebuilt with hinged doors for cream car service after car #73 was destroyed in 1913. Flatcar #10 was rebuilt in 1913 with a derrick for placing riprap. The remaining three 28 ft (8.5 m) flatcars were rebuilt in 1916 into express cars #80–82 with end doors and 6-foot-wide side doors. Combination #6 was converted to an express car by removing interior features and placing protective bars across the windows.

== See also ==
- List of heritage railroads in the United States
