= Alna, Maine =

Town in Maine, United States

- Town
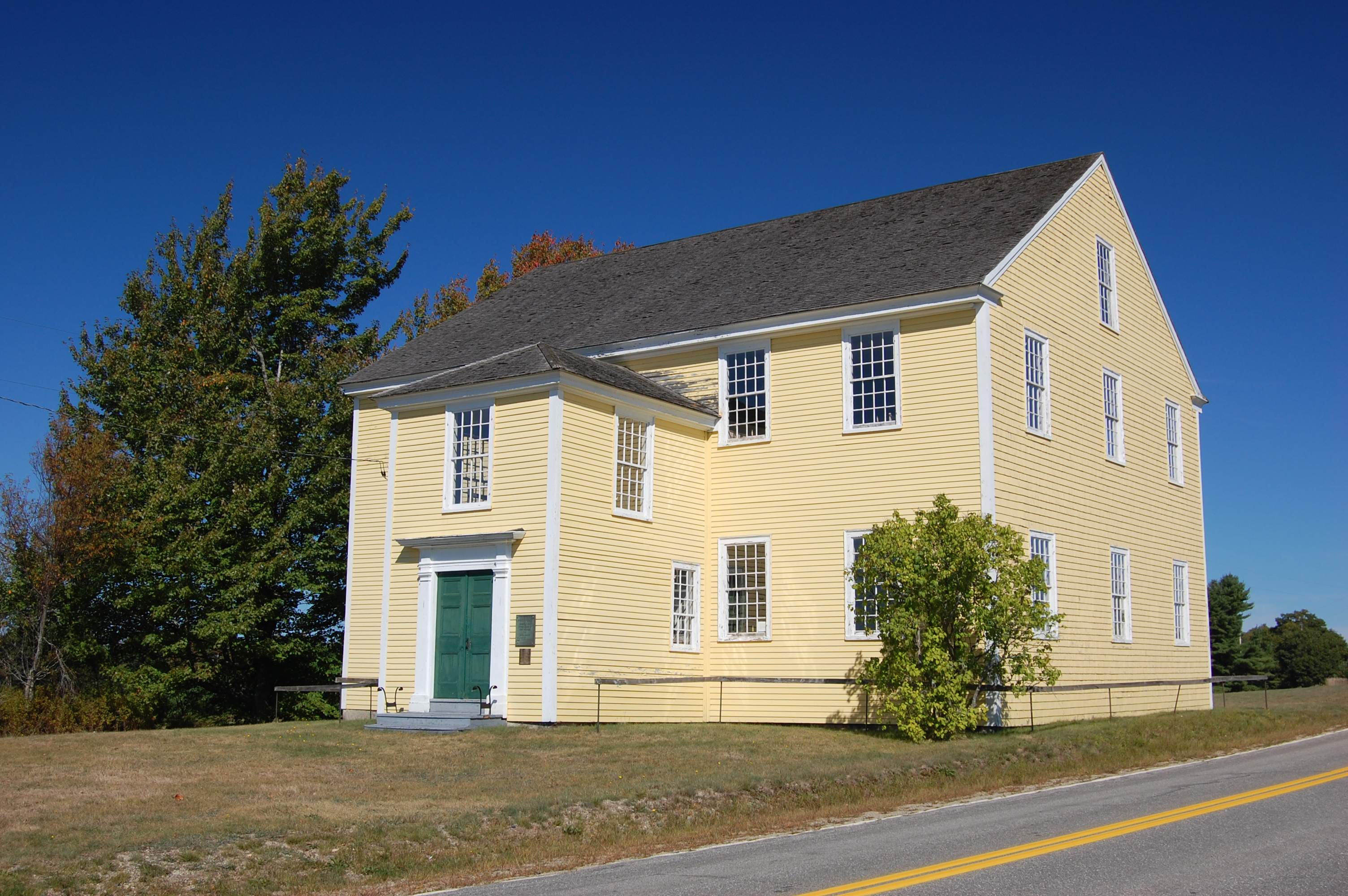
- Alna Meeting House, built in 1789

- Seal

- Location in Lincoln County and the state of Maine.
- Coordinates: 44°06′35″N 69°37′39″W
- Country: United States
- State: Maine
- County: Lincoln
- Settled: 1760
- Incorporated as Pownalborough: February 13, 1760
- Incorporated as New-Milford: June 25, 1794
- Name Changed to Alna: February 28, 1811

Government
  - Type: Town Meeting

Area
  - Total: 21.32 sq mi (55.22 km^{2})
  - Land: 20.90 sq mi (54.13 km^{2})
  - Water: 0.42 sq mi (1.09 km^{2})
- Elevation: 105 ft (32 m)

Population (2020)
  - Total: 710
  - Density: 34/sq mi (13.1/km^{2})
- Time zone: UTC-5 (Eastern)
  - Summer (DST): UTC-4 (Eastern)
- ZIP code: 04535
- Area code: 207
- FIPS code: 23-01010
- GNIS feature ID: 582321
- Website: http://alna.maine.gov

Alna is a town in Lincoln County, Maine, United States. The population was 710 at the 2020 census. Alna is home to the Wiscasset, Waterville and Farmington Railway Museum and is noted for its historic architecture, including the early mill village of Head Tide.

== History ==
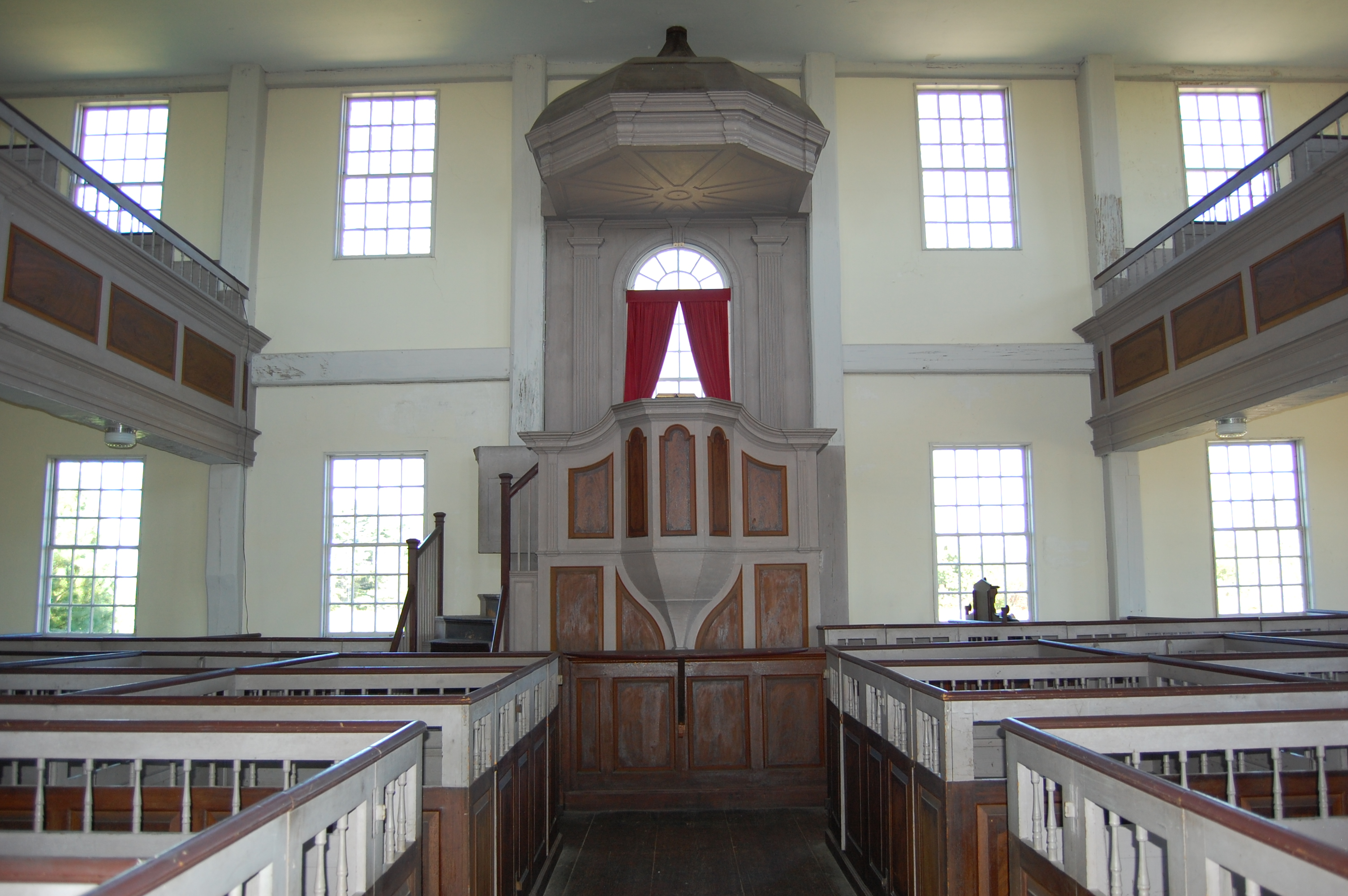
Pulpit at the Alna Meeting House

Originally a part of old Pownalborough, the town was settled around 1760 and incorporated in 1794 by the Massachusetts General Court as New Milford. But residents did not like the name, so it was changed in 1811 to Alna, Latin for alder, a tree which grows in abundance along the banks of the Sheepscot River.

Alna was the site of the first fish hatchery in Maine, started shortly after the Civil War. Between 1895 and 1933, the narrow gauge Wiscasset, Waterville & Farmington Railway operated three stations in the town: Head Tide, Alna Center, and Sheepscot. The latter now serves as the base of operations for a heritage railway in town.

In 2024, The Alna Store, at the intersection of Dock Road and Alna Road (Maine State Route 218), was voted by The New York Times one of America's Best Restaurants 2024.

== Geography ==
According to the United States Census Bureau, the town has a total area of 21.32 square miles (55.22 km^{2}), of which 20.90 square miles (54.13 km^{2}) is land and 0.42 square miles (1.09 km^{2}) is water. Alna is drained by the Sheepscot River.

The town in crossed by Maine State Route 194 and Maine State Route 218. It borders the towns of Wiscasset to the south; Dresden to the west; Pittston, Whitefield and Jefferson to the north; and across the Sheepscot River, Newcastle to the east.

== Demographics ==
Historical population
Census	Pop.	Note	%±
1800	636		—
1810	797		25.3%
1820	978		22.7%
1830	1,175		20.1%
1840	990		−15.7%
1850	916		−7.5%
1860	805		−12.1%
1870	747		−7.2%
1880	687		−8.0%
1890	512		−25.5%
1900	444		−13.3%
1910	457		2.9%
1920	320		−30.0%
1930	294		−8.1%
1940	339		15.3%
1950	350		3.2%
1960	347		−0.9%
1970	315		−9.2%
1980	425		34.9%
1990	571		34.4%
2000	675		18.2%
2010	709		5.0%
2020	710		0.1%
U.S. Decennial Census

=== 2010 census ===
As of the census of 2010, there were 709 people, 295 households, and 210 families living in the town. The population density was 33.9 inhabitants per square mile (13.1/km^{2}). There were 346 housing units at an average density of 16.6 per square mile (6.4/km^{2}). The racial makeup of the town was 97.5% White, 0.1% African American, 1.1% Native American, 0.4% Asian, 0.1% from other races, and 0.7% from two or more races. Hispanic or Latino of any race were 0.6% of the population.

There were 295 households, of which 28.1% had children under the age of 18 living with them, 60.0% were married couples living together, 6.8% had a female householder with no husband present, 4.4% had a male householder with no wife present, and 28.8% were non-families. 21.0% of all households were made up of individuals, and 6.7% had someone living alone who was 65 years of age or older. The average household size was 2.40 and the average family size was 2.78.

The median age in the town was 45.7 years. 20.9% of residents were under the age of 18; 5.5% were between the ages of 18 and 24; 22.1% were from 25 to 44; 35.2% were from 45 to 64; and 16.2% were 65 years of age or older. The gender makeup of the town was 48.7% male and 51.3% female.

=== 2000 census ===
As of the census of 2000, there were 675 people, 266 households, and 197 families living in the town. The population density was 32.3 inhabitants per square mile (12.5/km^{2}). There were 315 housing units at an average density of 15.1 per square mile (5.8/km^{2}). The racial makeup of the town was 99.56% White, 0.30% Native American and 0.15% Asian. Hispanic or Latino of any race were 0.15% of the population. 0.1% African Americans.

There were 266 households, out of which 34.6% had children under the age of 18 living with them, 64.3% were married couples living together, 6.4% had a female householder with no husband present, and 25.6% were non-families. 19.9% of all households were made up of individuals, and 9.4% had someone living alone who was 65 years of age or older. The average household size was 2.54 and the average family size was 2.94.

In the town, the population was spread out, with 25.0% under the age of 18, 4.9% from 18 to 24, 27.4% from 25 to 44, 28.6% from 45 to 64, and 14.1% who were 65 years of age or older. The median age was 41 years. For every 100 females there were 99.7 males. For every 100 females age 18 and over, there were 96.9 males.

The median income for a household in the town was $43,125, and the median income for a family was $48,611. Males had a median income of $34,375 versus $23,977 for females. The per capita income for the town was $17,340. About 6.7% of families and 6.3% of the population were below the poverty line, including 5.7% of those under age 18 and 10.1% of those age 65 or over.

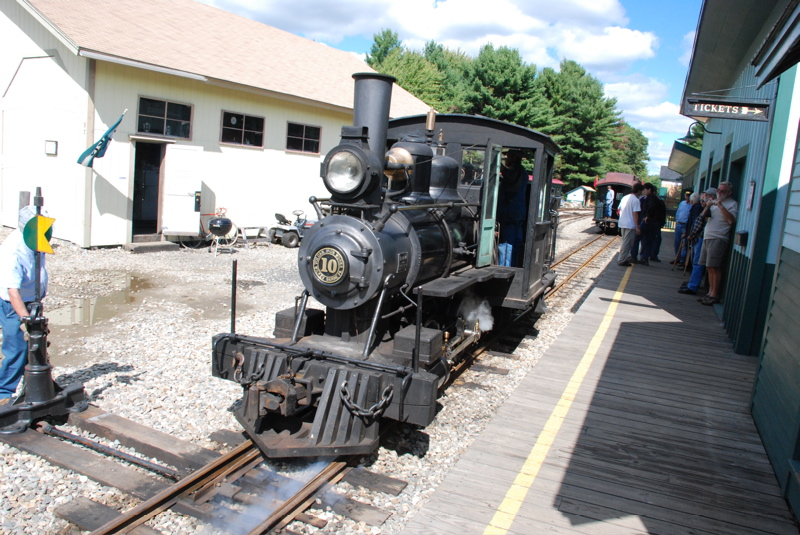
The Wiscasset, Waterville & Farmington Railway Museum

== Sites of interest ==
- Alna Meetinghouse (1789)
- Alna School (1795)
- Wiscasset, Waterville and Farmington Railway

== Notable people ==
- Fred H. Albee, surgeon
- John T. Averill, U.S. Representative from Minnesota
- Edwin Arlington Robinson, poet and Pulitzer Prize recipient
