= Newcastle, Maine =

Town in Maine, United States

- Town
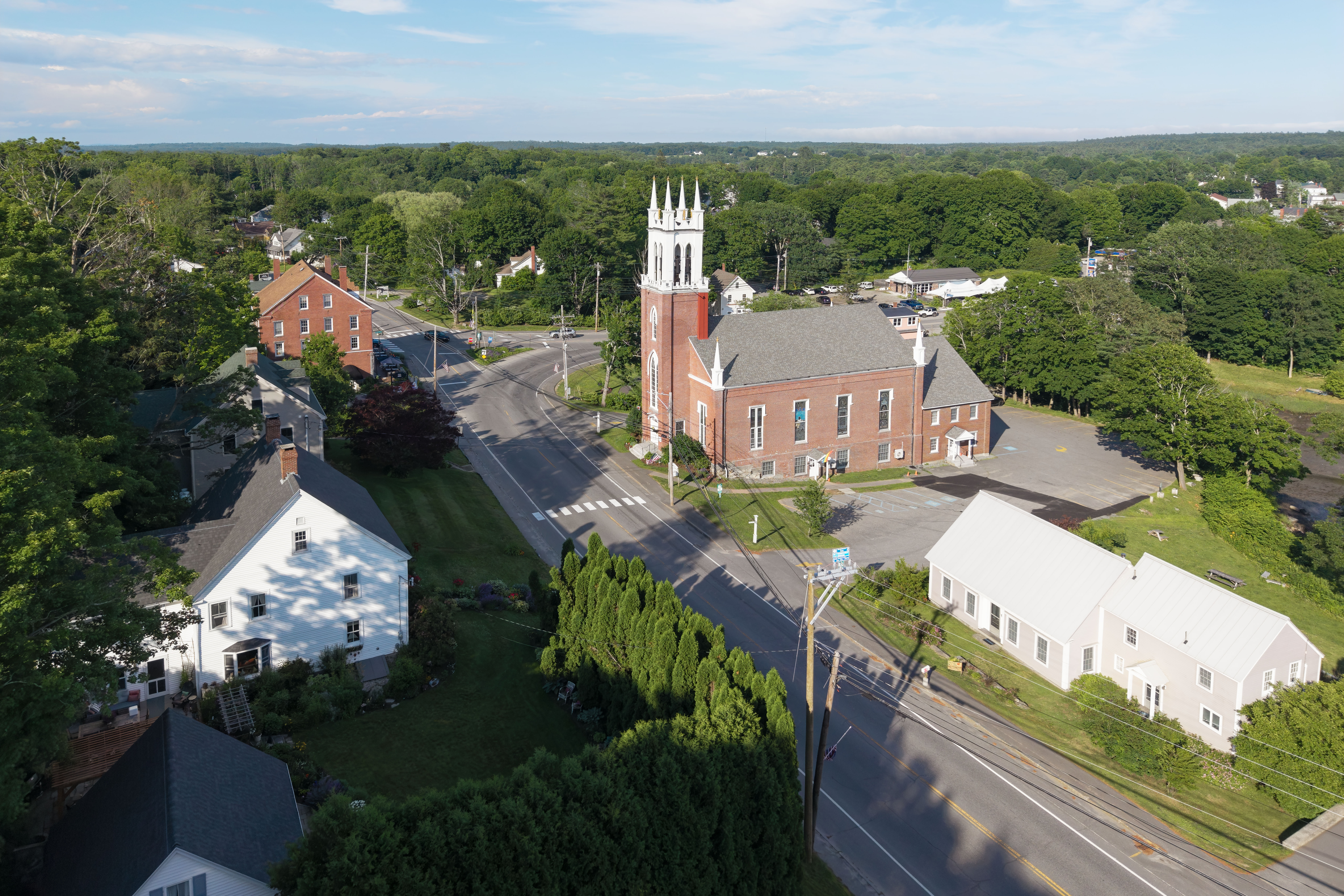
- Newcastle c. 2026

- Seal

- Location in Lincoln County and the state of Maine.
- Coordinates: 44°00′55″N 69°34′53″W
- Country: United States
- State: Maine
- County: Lincoln
- Incorporated (district): June 19, 1753
- Incorporated (town): August 23, 1775

Area
  - Total: 32.57 sq mi (84.36 km^{2})
  - Land: 29.05 sq mi (75.24 km^{2})
  - Water: 3.52 sq mi (9.12 km^{2})
- Elevation: 115 ft (35 m)

Population (2020)
  - Total: 1,848
  - Density: 64/sq mi (24.6/km^{2})
- Time zone: UTC-5 (Eastern (EST))
  - Summer (DST): UTC-4 (EDT)
- ZIP code: 04553
- Area code: 207
- FIPS code: 23-48645
- GNIS feature ID: 582617
- Website: www.newcastlemaine.us

Newcastle is a town in Lincoln County, Maine, United States. The population was 1,848 at the 2020 census. The village of Newcastle is located in the eastern part of the town, on the Damariscotta River. Together with the village of Damariscotta linked by the Main Street bridge, they form the Twin Villages (see Damariscotta-Newcastle CDP).

== History ==
=== Early settlement and European contact ===
Originally known as Sheepscot Plantation, Newcastle was among the earliest European settlements in Maine, first established in the 1630s by fishermen and approximately 50 families. Settled in the early 1630s, Newcastle was the first town to be incorporated within the colonial territory of Sagadahoc. The settlement was part of the broader English colonization efforts along the Maine coast during the early 17th century, following the failed Popham Colony of 1607-1608.

Between 1649 and 1650, John Mason purchased a tract of land from the local sachems Chief Robinhood and Chief Jack Pudding, though the specifics of this transaction remain unclear from surviving records. The territory came under the authority of the Duke of York in 1665, who renamed the settlement New Dartmouth.

=== Colonial conflicts and abandonment ===
The settlement faced repeated destruction during the colonial period as part of the broader French and Indian Wars. As was the case in many early places, residents fled in 1675 during the first Indian War on a vessel supplied by William Phipps. In 1676, during King Philip's War, the plantation was attacked and destroyed. Although some inhabitants returned after the war's conclusion, the village was destroyed again in 1689 during King William's War. Following this second destruction, the area remained largely unoccupied for approximately 40 years.

This pattern of settlement and abandonment was common throughout coastal Maine during this period. The French developed and maintained strong relations with the local Indian tribes through Catholic missionaries. The conflicts reflected the broader struggle between French and English colonial powers for control of northeastern North America, with native peoples often caught between competing European claims.

=== Resettlement and incorporation ===
In 1730, Colonel David Dunbar, superintendent and governor of the Province of Sagadahoc, led efforts to resettle the area. The new settlement was named Newcastle in honor of Thomas Pelham-Holles, 1st Duke of Newcastle-upon-Tyne, the King's primary secretary and a friend of the colonies.

Newcastle was incorporated into a District on June 19, 1753, in the county of York. A District is not a town and, as such could not send a representative to the General Assembly. The community was later incorporated as a full town on August 23, 1775, allowing it to send representatives to the Massachusetts General Court. It set off land to New Milford (Alna) in 1795 and annexed land from Jefferson in 1858.

=== 19th century development ===
==== Maritime economy and shipbuilding ====
During the 19th century, Newcastle became an important center of Maine's thriving shipbuilding industry. Beginning as early as 1770 and continuing until 1920, the shipbuilding era on the Damariscotta River spanned a remarkable 150 years. Over 32 shipyards have been documented, mostly in the upper section of the river including Great Salt Bay. By the time national records of the industry were being kept in the 1830s, Maine was building more ships each year than any other state.

Ships built here sailed the entire globe with destinations near and far, exporting timber, salted fish, bricks and ice and returning with coal, spices, tropical fruits, and other trade items. The town's location on the Damariscotta River provided ideal conditions for shipbuilding, with deep water access and abundant timber resources from Maine's forests.

One of Newcastle's most prominent maritime figures was William T. Glidden, born in Newcastle on September 22, 1805. He was a partner in the clipper ship firm Glidden & Williams along with John M. S. Williams, which operated primarily between Boston and California during the 1850s and 1860s. Over the years the firm owned over 50 ships, running about one ship per month to California during its heyday. Although spending his winters in Boston, Glidden maintained a summer home in Newcastle. His continued interest in the town was manifested by his endowment of the Episcopal Church in 1850.

==== Transportation revolution ====
The arrival of the railroad dramatically transformed Newcastle's economy and connectivity. In 1871 the 1st train arrived in Newcastle operated by the Knox Lincoln Railroad. The Knox and Lincoln Railroad was part of a broader effort to connect Maine's coastal communities, commencing service to Rockland in 1871.

The country was madly building railroads in all parts of the country but the magnitude of the project of building a railroad from Bath to Rockland was not fully appreciated. Most railroads had followed the easy slopes of river valleys. This proposed route crossed every river, inlet, pond, stream, brook and marsh along the coast. In 1959 connecting passenger train service was ended by Maine Central Railroad.

==== Religious and cultural development ====
Newcastle became home to significant religious institutions during this period. St. Patrick's Church, Damariscotta Mills Foundation laid 1807 ~ Completed in 1808. The church holds the distinction of being "the oldest Catholic Church in New England" and was "the oldest surviving Catholic Church between New York and Quebec." The architectural design of the St. Patrick's Church was the responsibility of Nicolas Codd, an Irishman who came to New England to design and build the church.

The town also became associated with Irish Catholic immigration to Maine. James Kavanagh enlisted housewright Nicholas Codd, also an Irish immigrant, to design his Federal-style mansion. James Kavanagh's son, Edward Kavanagh, became a prominent political figure, serving as the seventeenth governor of Maine and becoming the first Catholic Governor of Maine upon the resignation of Governor Fairfield on March 7, 1843.

==== Educational development ====
Beginning in 1765, the town began to support schools. By the 1890s and many years later, 15 school districts existed. The town's commitment to education reflected broader trends in 19th-century Maine toward establishing public schooling systems.

=== 20th century and modern era ===
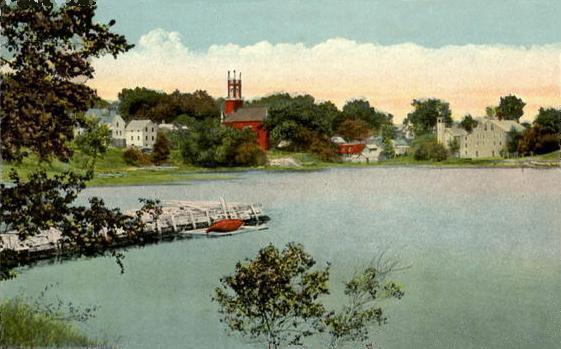
Damariscotta River c. 1920

The early 20th century brought significant changes to Newcastle's economy as traditional maritime industries declined. In the second half of the century Maine's traditional industries showed little of the vigor they displayed earlier. The lumber, leather, granite, ice, slate, fish, and lime industries still supported more than 40 percent of Maine's working population at the end of the century, but these industries were technologically stagnant and plagued with seasonal layoffs and declining markets.

Newcastle gained national significance through its association with Frances Perkins, the first woman to hold a cabinet position as United States Secretary of Labor under Franklin D. Roosevelt. During her childhood, she often spent summers visiting her grandmother at the Perkins Family Homestead in Newcastle, Maine. She always considered this her "true home," and lived there later in life. Perkins designed or influenced many of the most significant programs and policies of the New Deal, including Social Security, the Civilian Conservation Corps, the Fair Labor Standards Act, anti-child labor laws, and a minimum wage.

In December 2024, the Frances Perkins Homestead received designation as a National Monument, furthering the Administration's goal to more fully recognize the contributions women have made to our country. The Frances Perkins National Monument sits on a fifty-seven-acre saltwater farm in Newcastle, Maine.

=== Historic preservation ===
In 1978, the village of Sheepscot on the Sheepscot River in western Newcastle was listed on the National Register of Historic Places as the Sheepscot Historic District. The district encompasses 51 contributing buildings representing Italianate, Greek Revival, and Federal architectural styles. The United States Geological Survey recognizes several spelling variants of the name Sheepscot, including Sheepscott, Shepscooke, Shippscutt, and Shipscot.

== Geography ==
According to the United States Census Bureau, the town has a total area of 32.57 square miles (84.36 km^{2}), of which 29.05 square miles (75.24 km^{2}) is land and 3.52 square miles (9.12 km^{2}) is water. Newcastle is situated beside the Damariscotta River.

The town is crossed by U. S. Route 1 and state routes 194 and 215. It borders the towns of Jefferson to the north, Edgecomb to the south, and Alna to the northwest. Separated by water, it is near the towns of Wiscasset to the southwest, and Nobleboro, Damariscotta, Bristol and South Bristol to the east.

=== Climate ===
Climate data for Newcastle, Maine, 1991–2020 normals, extremes 1965–2022
Month	Jan	Feb	Mar	Apr	May	Jun	Jul	Aug	Sep	Oct	Nov	Dec	Year
Record high °F (°C)	57 (14)	63 (17)	85 (29)	87 (31)	94 (34)	93 (34)	98 (37)	101 (38)	93 (34)	82 (28)	71 (22)	64 (18)	101 (38)
Mean maximum °F (°C)	48.4 (9.1)	47.7 (8.7)	58.1 (14.5)	70.7 (21.5)	83.5 (28.6)	86.8 (30.4)	88.8 (31.6)	87.2 (30.7)	82.4 (28.0)	70.3 (21.3)	61.3 (16.3)	52.6 (11.4)	91.0 (32.8)
Mean daily maximum °F (°C)	30.1 (−1.1)	33.0 (0.6)	41.0 (5.0)	53.5 (11.9)	64.9 (18.3)	73.0 (22.8)	78.3 (25.7)	77.1 (25.1)	69.0 (20.6)	57.0 (13.9)	45.8 (7.7)	35.5 (1.9)	54.9 (12.7)
Daily mean °F (°C)	22.4 (−5.3)	25.0 (−3.9)	32.9 (0.5)	44.2 (6.8)	54.8 (12.7)	63.3 (17.4)	69.1 (20.6)	68.1 (20.1)	60.6 (15.9)	49.4 (9.7)	39.0 (3.9)	28.7 (−1.8)	46.5 (8.1)
Mean daily minimum °F (°C)	14.7 (−9.6)	16.9 (−8.4)	24.8 (−4.0)	34.8 (1.6)	44.6 (7.0)	53.7 (12.1)	59.8 (15.4)	59.1 (15.1)	52.2 (11.2)	41.8 (5.4)	32.1 (0.1)	21.9 (−5.6)	38.0 (3.4)
Mean minimum °F (°C)	−7.0 (−21.7)	−2.9 (−19.4)	4.9 (−15.1)	24.0 (−4.4)	33.6 (0.9)	42.7 (5.9)	51.2 (10.7)	49.0 (9.4)	37.7 (3.2)	28.4 (−2.0)	16.4 (−8.7)	2.1 (−16.6)	−8.9 (−22.7)
Record low °F (°C)	−20 (−29)	−18 (−28)	−9 (−23)	12 (−11)	27 (−3)	36 (2)	44 (7)	36 (2)	27 (−3)	21 (−6)	3 (−16)	−20 (−29)	−20 (−29)
Average precipitation inches (mm)	3.83 (97)	3.61 (92)	4.32 (110)	4.17 (106)	3.80 (97)	4.28 (109)	3.42 (87)	3.35 (85)	4.19 (106)	4.97 (126)	4.57 (116)	4.74 (120)	49.25 (1,251)
Average snowfall inches (cm)	19.6 (50)	20.3 (52)	14.1 (36)	4.4 (11)	0.0 (0.0)	0.0 (0.0)	0.0 (0.0)	0.0 (0.0)	0.0 (0.0)	0.3 (0.76)	3.5 (8.9)	16.5 (42)	78.7 (200.66)
Average precipitation days (≥ 0.01 in)	12.3	10.6	11.1	12.2	13.6	12.7	12.4	10.0	10.3	12.0	12.0	13.1	142.3
Average snowy days (≥ 0.1 in)	10.2	8.6	6.7	2.5	0.0	0.0	0.0	0.0	0.0	0.2	2.2	7.7	38.1
Source 1: NOAA
Source 2: National Weather Service

== Demographics ==
Historical population
Census	Pop.	Note	%±
1790	896		—
1800	996		11.2%
1810	1,232		23.7%
1820	1,243		0.9%
1830	1,544		24.2%
1840	1,712		10.9%
1850	2,012		17.5%
1860	1,791		−11.0%
1870	1,729		−3.5%
1880	1,534		−11.3%
1890	1,282		−16.4%
1900	1,075		−16.1%
1910	1,066		−0.8%
1920	993		−6.8%
1930	914		−8.0%
1940	994		8.8%
1950	1,021		2.7%
1960	1,101		7.8%
1970	1,076		−2.3%
1980	1,227		14.0%
1990	1,538		25.3%
2000	1,748		13.7%
2010	1,752		0.2%
2020	1,848		5.5%
U.S. Decennial Census

=== 2000 census ===
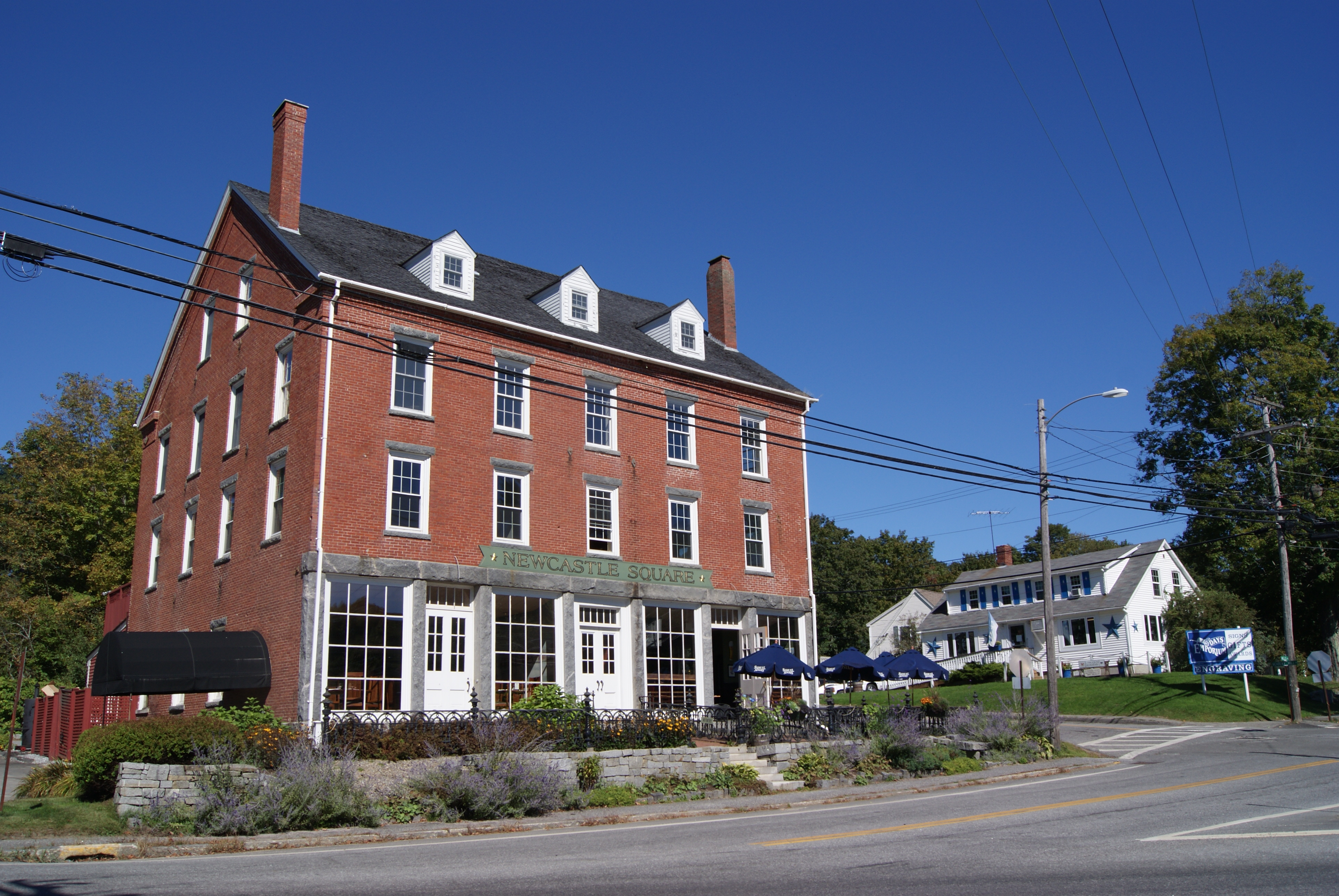
Newcastle Publick House

As of the census of 2000, there were 1,748 people, 724 households, and 493 families living in the town. The population density was 60.3 inhabitants per square mile (23.3/km^{2}). There were 880 housing units at an average density of 30.4 per square mile (11.7/km^{2}). The racial makeup of the town was 98.74% White, 0.11% African American, 0.11% Native American, 0.29% Asian, 0.06% from other races, and 0.69% from two or more races. Hispanic or Latino of any race were 0.69% of the population.

There were 724 households, of which 28.6% had children under the age of 18 living with them, 56.5% were married couples living together, 8.0% had a female householder with no husband present, and 31.9% were non-families. 26.4% of all households were made up of individuals, and 12.3% had someone living alone who was 65 years of age or older. The average household size was 2.37 and the average family size was 2.86.

In the town, the population was spread out, with 22.7% under the age of 18, 5.0% from 18 to 24, 22.7% from 25 to 44, 30.8% from 45 to 64, and 18.8% who were 65 years of age or older. The median age was 45 years. For every 100 females, there were 88.0 males. For every 100 females age 18 and over, there were 85.8 males.

The median income for a household in the town was $43,000, and the median income for a family was $51,250. Males had a median income of $33,750 versus $28,466 for females. The per capita income for the town was $24,289. About 4.2% of families and 7.0% of the population were below the poverty line, including 6.1% of those under age 18 and 9.5% of those age 65 or over.

=== 2010 census ===
As of the census of 2010, there were 1,752 people, 787 households, and 505 families living in the town. The population density was 60.3 inhabitants per square mile (23.3/km^{2}). There were 992 housing units at an average density of 34.1 per square mile (13.2/km^{2}). The racial makeup of the town was 97.8% White, 0.1% African American, 0.5% Native American, 0.3% Asian, 0.1% from other races, and 1.2% from two or more races. Hispanic or Latino of any race were 0.7% of the population.

There were 787 households, of which 23.8% had children under the age of 18 living with them, 52.9% were married couples living together, 8.5% had a female householder with no husband present, 2.8% had a male householder with no wife present, and 35.8% were non-families. 28.7% of all households were made up of individuals, and 15.2% had someone living alone who was 65 years of age or older. The average household size was 2.21 and the average family size was 2.70.

The median age in the town was 49.6 years. 18.6% of residents were under the age of 18; 5.2% were between the ages of 18 and 24; 19.8% were from 25 to 44; 33.4% were from 45 to 64; and 23.1% were 65 years of age or older. The gender makeup of the town was 47.7% male and 52.3% female.

== Sites of interest ==
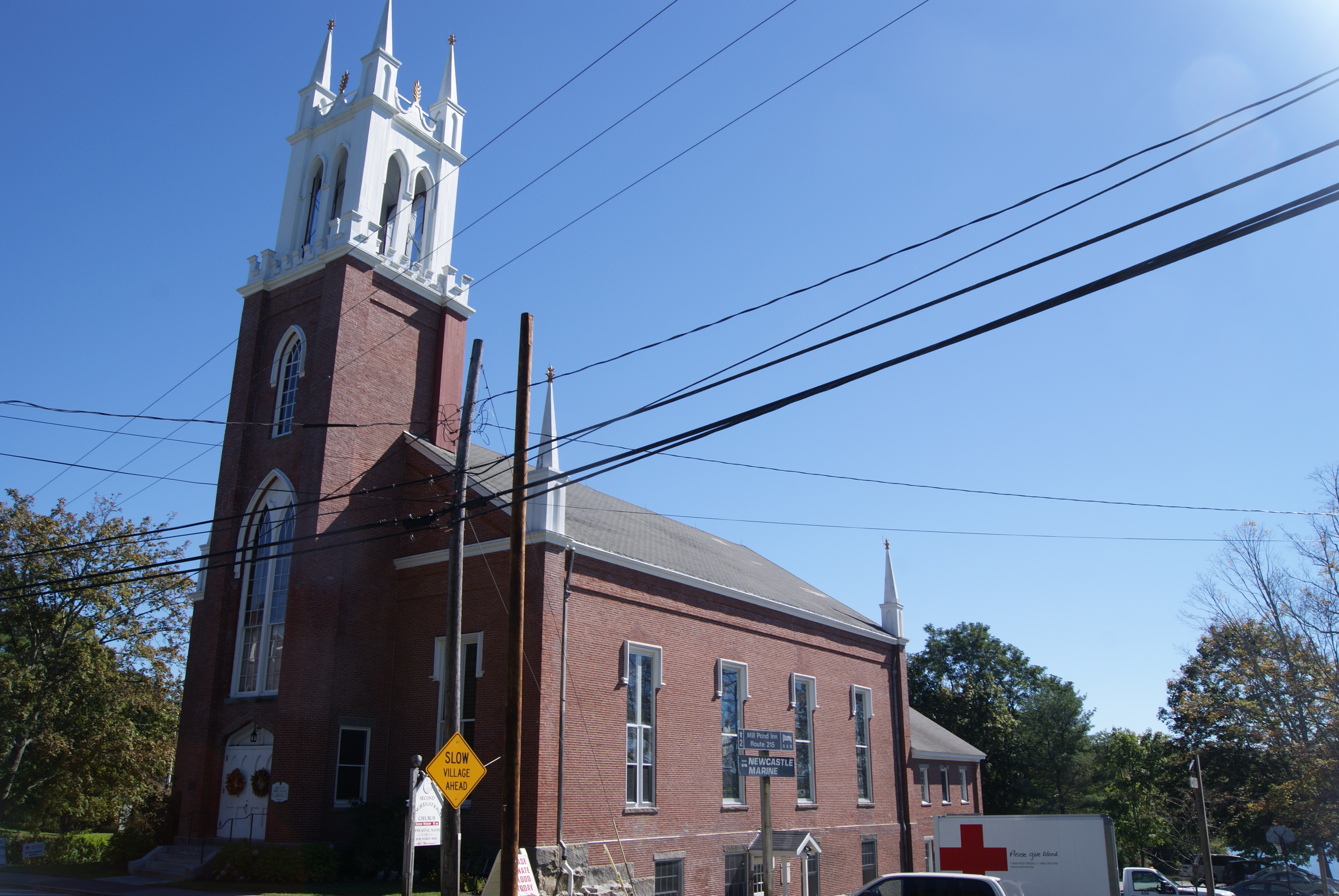
Second Congregational Church

- Frances Perkins National Monument
- Newcastle Historical Society & Museum
- Lincoln Academy
- Second Congregational Church
- St. Andrew's Church
- St. Patrick's Church

== Education ==
The elementary school district is the Great Salt Bay Community School District, while the municipality would be its own school district at the secondary level. Great Salt Bay Community School, a K-8 school, is in Damariscotta.

It was a part of Central Lincoln County School System a.k.a. Alternative Organizational Structure (AOS) 93. On July 21, 2025, Newcastle left AOS 93. It formed a regional school unit with Bremen and Damariscotta.

== Notable people ==
- Edwin Flye, US congressman
- William T. Glidden, clipper ship line co-owner and railroad investor
- Sumner Jackson, medical doctor of member of the French Resistance during World War II
- Frances Perkins, US Secretary of Labor under President Franklin Roosevelt
- Peter Throckmorton, American pioneer underwater archaeologist
