= Jefferson, Maine =

Town in Maine, United States

- Town
- Seal

- Location in Lincoln County and the state of Maine.
- Coordinates: 44°11′24″N 69°29′45″W
- Country: United States
- State: Maine
- County: Lincoln
- Settled (Ballstown Plantation): 1770
- Incorporated (Jefferson): February 24, 1807

Area
  - Total: 58.58 sq mi (151.72 km^{2})
  - Land: 52.57 sq mi (136.16 km^{2})
  - Water: 6.01 sq mi (15.57 km^{2})
- Elevation: 240 ft (73 m)

Population (2020)
  - Total: 2,551
  - Density: 18.7/sq mi (7.2/km^{2})
- Time zone: UTC-5 (Eastern (EST))
  - Summer (DST): UTC-4 (EDT)
- ZIP code: 04348
- Area code: 207
- FIPS code: 23-35695
- GNIS feature ID: 582535
- Website: jeffersonmaine.org

Jefferson is a town in Lincoln County, Maine, United States. The population was 2,551 at the 2020 census. Damariscotta Lake State Park, a popular Mid Coast swimming, canoeing and picnic area, is located within the town limits.

== History ==
Jefferson is a town in Lincoln County, incorporated on February 24, 1807, when Thomas Jefferson was president, from Ballstown Plantation. During the 19th Century, it set off land to Alna and Newcastle, and annexed land from Patricktown, later incorporated as Somerville.

Abandoned granite quarries and clay banks where bricks were made suggest the early economic activities of the area.

== Geography ==
According to the United States Census Bureau, the town has a total area of 58.58 square miles (151.72 km^{2}), of which 52.57 square miles (136.16 km^{2}) is land and 6.01 square miles (15.57 km^{2}) is water. Jefferson is located on the Great Bay of Damariscotta Lake. Damariscotta Lake State Park is a 17-acre (69,000 m^{2}) State Park located in Jefferson.

== Demographics ==
Historical population
Census	Pop.	Note	%±
1810	1,205		—
1820	1,577		30.9%
1830	2,074		31.5%
1840	2,214		6.8%
1850	2,225		0.5%
1860	2,121		−4.7%
1870	1,821		−14.1%
1880	1,590		−12.7%
1890	1,391		−12.5%
1900	1,155		−17.0%
1910	1,030		−10.8%
1920	914		−11.3%
1930	888		−2.8%
1940	938		5.6%
1950	1,215		29.5%
1960	1,048		−13.7%
1970	1,242		18.5%
1980	1,616		30.1%
1990	2,111		30.6%
2000	2,388		13.1%
2010	2,427		1.6%
2020	2,551		5.1%
U.S. Decennial Census

=== 2010 census ===
As of the census of 2010, there were 2,427 people, 1,010 households, and 703 families living in the town. The population density was 46.2 inhabitants per square mile (17.8/km^{2}). There were 1,564 housing units at an average density of 29.8 per square mile (11.5/km^{2}). The racial makeup of the town was 98.1% White, 0.3% African American, 0.5% Native American, 0.2% Asian, 0.1% from other races, and 0.7% from two or more races. Hispanic or Latino of any race were 1.5% of the population.

There were 1,010 households, of which 28.2% had children under the age of 18 living with them, 57.2% were married couples living together, 8.2% had a female householder with no husband present, 4.2% had a male householder with no wife present, and 30.4% were non-families. 23.0% of all households were made up of individuals, and 8.9% had someone living alone who was 65 years of age or older. The average household size was 2.39 and the average family size was 2.79.

The median age in the town was 46 years. 20% of residents were under the age of 18; 6.9% were between the ages of 18 and 24; 22.1% were from 25 to 44; 34% were from 45 to 64; and 17.1% were 65 years of age or older. The gender makeup of the town was 49.8% male and 50.2% female.

=== 2000 census ===
As of the census of 2000, there were 2,388 people, 945 households, and 687 families living in the town. The population density was 45.3 inhabitants per square mile (17.5/km^{2}). There were 1,427 housing units at an average density of 27.1 per square mile (10.5/km^{2}). The racial makeup of the town was 98.83% White, 0.08% African American, 0.04% Native American, 0.17% Asian, 0.13% from other races, and 0.75% from two or more races. Hispanic or Latino of any race were 0.34% of the population.

There were 945 households, out of which 31.7% had children under the age of 18 living with them, 62.4% were married couples living together, 6.3% had a female householder with no husband present, and 27.2% were non-families. 21.2% of all households were made up of individuals, and 9.1% had someone living alone who was 65 years of age or older. The average household size was 2.52 and the average family size was 2.91.

In the town, the population was spread out, with 24.6% under the age of 18, 5.5% from 18 to 24, 28.7% from 25 to 44, 26.3% from 45 to 64, and 14.9% who were 65 years of age or older. The median age was 40 years. For every 100 females, there were 97.4 males. For every 100 females age 18 and over, there were 98.6 males.

The median income for a household in the town was $42,311, and the median income for a family was $45,694. Males had a median income of $30,865 versus $25,430 for females. The per capita income for the town was $20,298. About 7.3% of families and 12.3% of the population were below the poverty line, including 17.4% of those under age 18 and 11.4% of those age 65 or over.

== Government ==
Jefferson's government consists of a three-member Board of Selectmen, A Chair Selectman is chosen each year, this person oversees the monthly meetings. There is no Town Manager, a Town Clerk runs maintains the day-to-day operations.

== Education ==
Jefferson has one K–8 public school, Jefferson Village School, and one public library.

The school district is the Jefferson School District. Jefferson Village School is a part of the Central Lincoln County School System (Alternative Organizational Structure 93).

For high school, AOS 93 does not have a public high school. It sends high school students to Lincoln Academy, a private school, and pays tuition. Students in the AOS 93 area are free to select other high schools instead, with tuition paid there.

== Notable people ==
- Beatrice Farnham, 20th-century artist and entrepreneur
- James A. Linscott (1846–1913), lumberman, politician
- Paul A. MacDonald, Secretary of State of Maine
- Estelle M. H. Merrill (pen name, Jean Kincaid; 1858–1908), journalist, editor
- Oakes Murphy, US congressman and fourteenth governor of Arizona Territory
