= Bridgton and Saco River Railroad =

American transport company

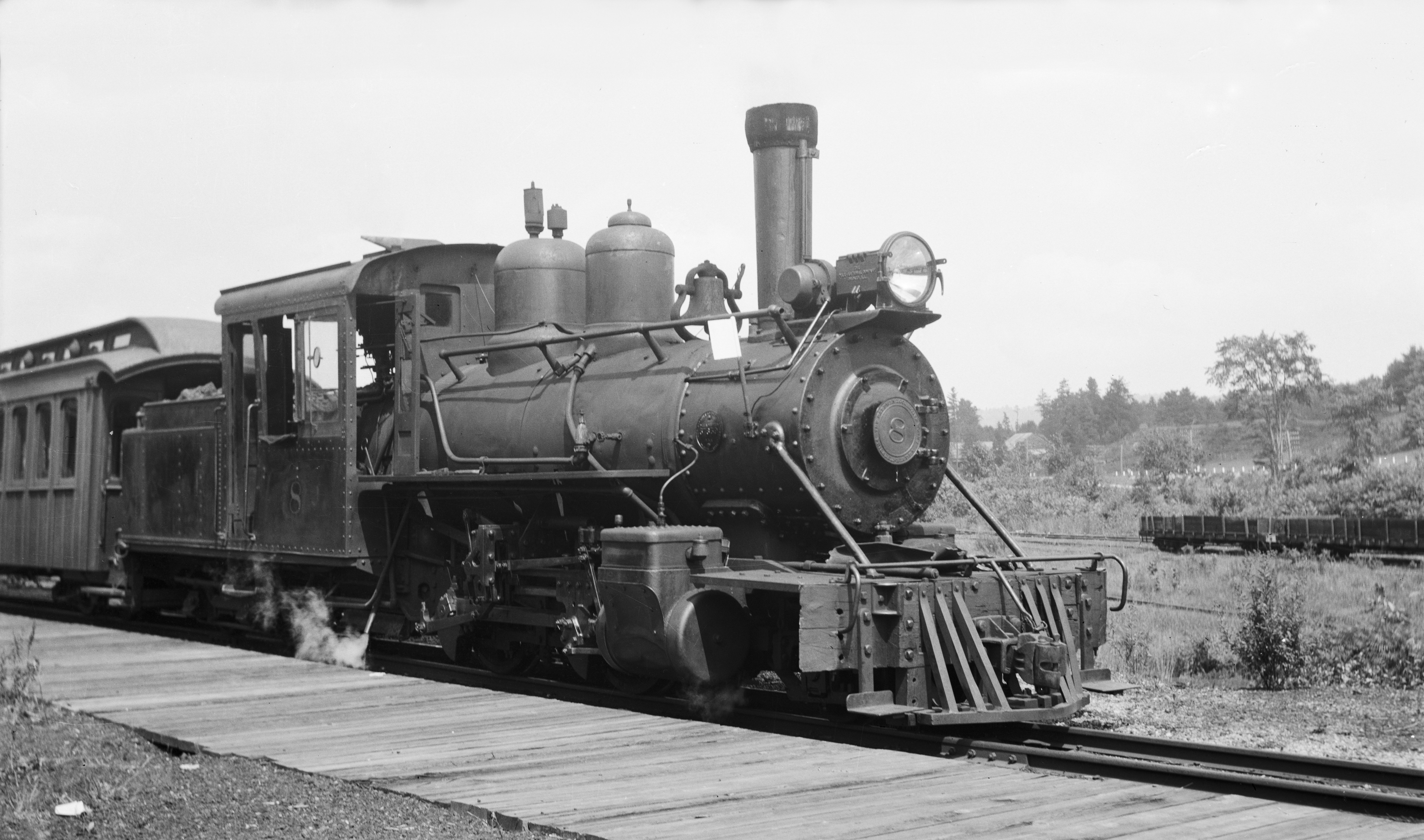
- Bridgton locomotive #8 at the station at Bridgton Jct. sometime in the 1930's.

Overview
- Headquarters: Bridgton
- Locale: Maine
- Dates of operation: 1883–1941

Technical
- Track gauge: 2 ft (610 mm)
- Length: 21 miles (34 km)

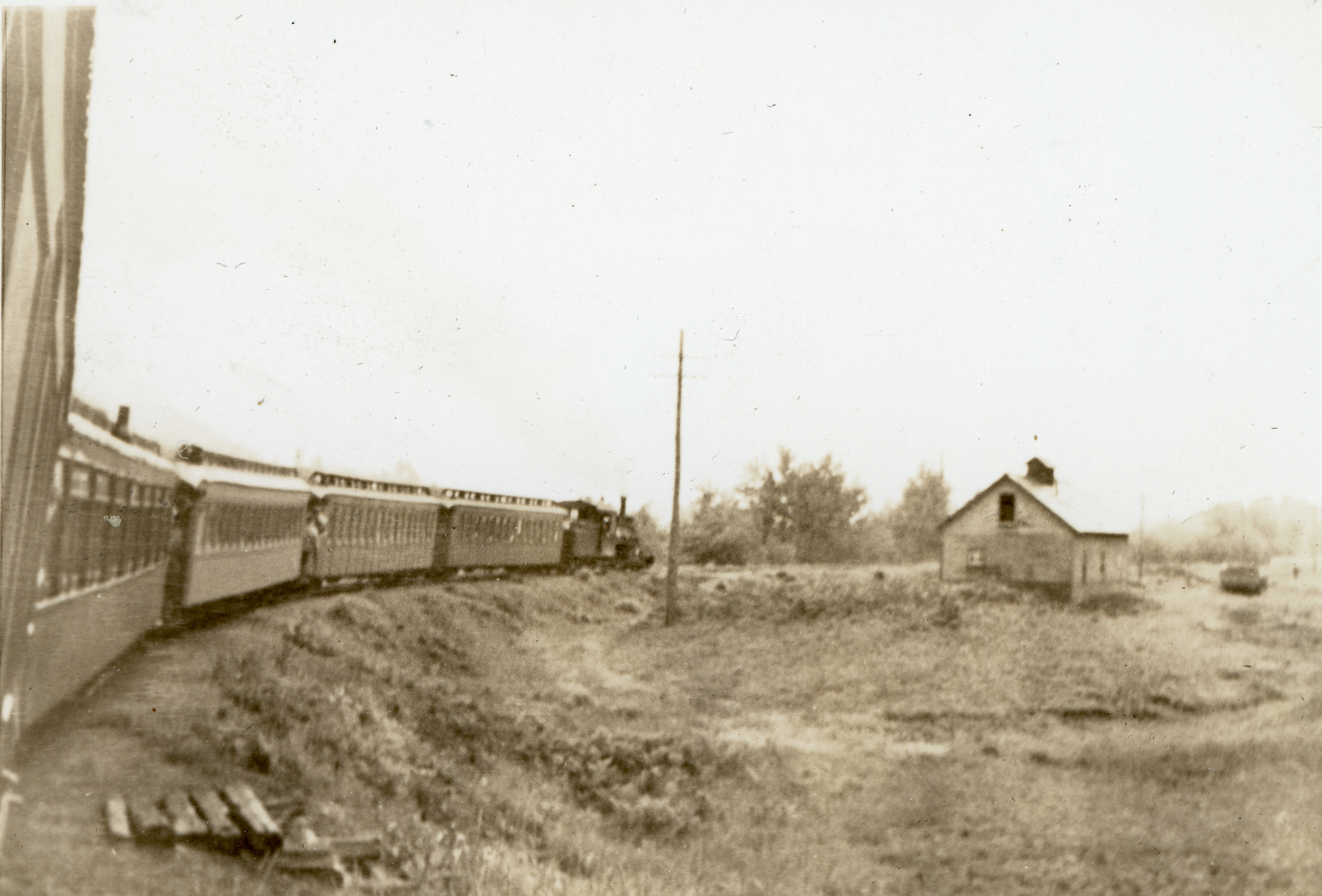
Bridgton & Harrison Railway (formerly Bridgton & Saco River Railroad) fan trip departing Bridgton Jct. on June 27th, 1937.

The Bridgton and Saco River Railroad (B&SR) was a 2 ft (610 mm) narrow gauge railroad that operated in the vicinity of Bridgton and Harrison, Maine. It connected with the Portland and Ogdensburg Railroad (later Maine Central Railroad Mountain Division) from Portland, Maine, to St. Johnsbury, Vermont, near the town of Hiram on the Saco River.

== History ==
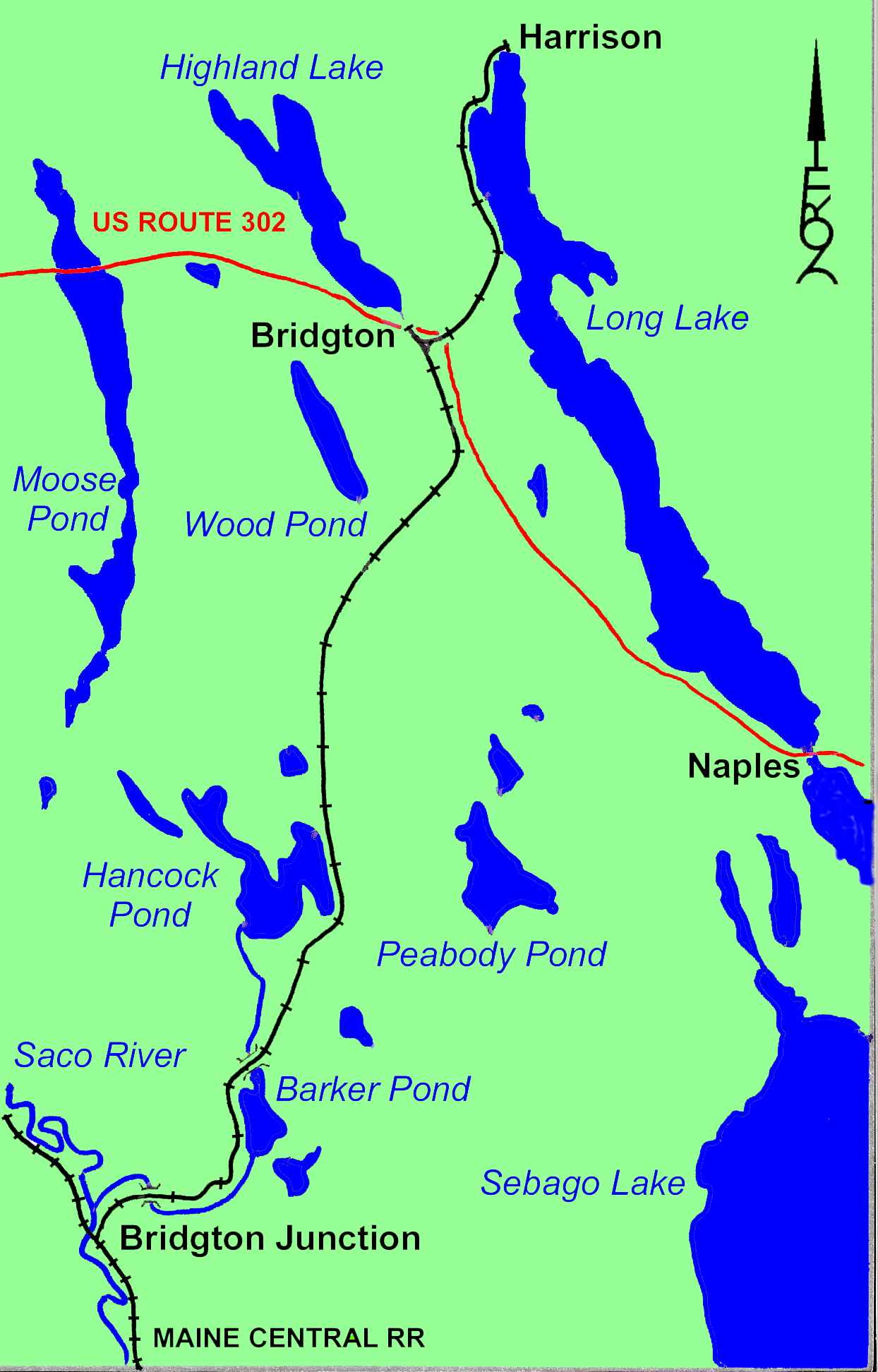
Map of the Bridgton & Saco River Railroad from 1898 to 1930.

B&SR design was based on experience of the Sandy River Railroad. Hinkley Locomotive Works modified their 2 ft (610 mm) gauge Forney design to run boiler first with an extended frame similar to that installed on Sandy River Railroad #1 following a wreck in early 1882. The successful design of the Bridgton Hinkleys was subsequently repeated for the Monson Railroad and the Franklin and Megantic Railway. Construction began in 1882, and trains were running to Bridgton by early 1883.

B&SR used early profits to replace wooden trestles with earthen fills. A 14-foot (4.3 m) granite masonry arch was constructed over Hancock Brook in 1895. Track was extended to Harrison with 35 lb/yd (17.4 kg/m) steel rails in 1898. Trestles on the Harrison extension had been replaced by earthen fills and plate girder bridges by 1906. Original Hinkley locomotives #1-2 were replaced by #5-6 of an improved design with pilot wheels. B&SR then replaced the original 30 lb/yd (14.9 kg/m) steel rails from Bridgton Junction to Bridgton with 48 lb/yd (23.8 kg/m) and 50 lb/yd (24.8 kg/m) steel rails from 1907 to 1910 before Maine Central Railroad secured control of the B&SR in 1912.

Under Maine Central operation, there were 4 mixed train round trips daily from Harrison to Bridgton Junction and return. The first left Harrison at 5:15 am and the last returned to Harrison at 8:45 pm. Train speed seldom exceeded 20 miles per hour (32 km/h). Two passenger train sets were required for this service. The first consisted of baggage #10, RPO #25, and one or two coaches. A couple of bench seats at one end of baggage-RPO #11 provided smoking accommodation for the second train set. Freight traffic in 1913 was 18% outbound lumber, 15% outbound pulpwood, 15% inbound coal, 11% outbound apples and canned corn, 11% manufactured goods, 10% feed & grain, 10% express, and 2% inbound petroleum products. Locomotive #8 was the last locomotive built for the Maine 2 ft gauge railways.

Bond interest went unpaid in 1926, and the town of Bridgton began a 15-year effort to preserve their railroad. The B&SR was reorganized as the Bridgton and Harrison Railway; but the extension to Harrison was dismantled after locomotive #8 tipped over when the 35 lb/yd rails sagged in 1930. Locomotive #8 was the heaviest locomotive on any 2 ft gauge railway in Maine. B&SR became a tourist attraction as the last 2 ft gauge railroad offering passenger service in the late 1930s. Operation ceased in September 1941. The rolling stock was preserved when the rails were converted to scrap metal as the United States prepared for World War II. The rolling stock was moved to Massachusetts for another half-century of operation on the Edaville Railroad after the war. Subsequent to the restructuring of the Edaville Railroad, the historic Bridgton and Saco narrow gauge equipment returned to the state of Maine and are mostly located at the Maine Narrow Gauge Railroad Co. & Museum in Portland.

There are still signs of the B&SR evident in a few places if one searches carefully for them. Members of the Wiscasset, Waterville and Farmington Railway Museum have organized informal tours in the past several years to explore these remains. A new group, the Bridgton & Saco River Railroad Museum, was established in 2020 and have plans to build a new railyard in Bridgton for a museum and possible tourist railroad on the original right of way between Sandy Creek and Perleys Mills. More info can be found about this new revival of the Bridgton & Saco River on their website at Bridgtonrailroad.org.

== Geography ==
Bridgton and Saco River Railroad (Main Line)

Technical
- Line length: 20.7 mi (33.3 km)
- Track gauge: 2 ft (610 mm)

Milepost 0: Bridgton Junction - Interchange yard with the Portland and Ogdensburg (later Maine Central Railroad Mountain Division.) Agent's station shared with Maine Central Railroad. B&SR had 6 northbound spurs plus a turntable with a single-stall enginehouse. The freight house spur was dual gauge, and there was a second dual gauge spur for loading and unloading narrow gauge-equipment on standard-gauge cars. There was no runaround track; so southbound B&SR locomotives uncoupled their train on the main line, moved into the yard, threw a turnout, and let their train roll past them into the yard by gravity to avoid being trapped at the end of the spur.

Milepost 0.8: Scribner's - southbound spur.

Milepost 1: granite masonry arch over Hancock Brook.

Milepost 1.2: Small's

Milepost 2.0: Rankin's Mill - small flag stop passenger shelter.

Milepost 2.7: Mullen Siding - northbound spur.

Milepost 3: Summit - highest point on the railroad.

Milepost 4: Fill over the north end of Barker pond with granite masonry abutments for a short timber stringer span on the boundary between Hiram and the town of Sebago.

Milepost 4.4: Twin Lake - small flag stop passenger shelter.

Milepost 5.4: Gravel Pit - northbound spur.

Milepost 7: The Notch - a rock cut.

Milepost 7.2: West Sebago - southbound spur with small flag stop passenger shelter.

Milepost 7.5: Water Tank Siding - passing siding adjacent to Hancock Pond. The main line ran between Hancock Pond and B&SR superintendent Joseph Bennett's lakeside cottage a short distance south of the covered water tank.

Milepost 9.0: Perley's Mills - southbound spur with small flag stop passenger shelter.

Milepost 10.5: Ingall's Road - southbound spur with small flag stop passenger shelter.

Milepost 11.3: Kennett's - southbound spur.

Milepost 12.1: South Bridgton - southbound spur with small flag stop passenger shelter.

Milepost 13: high fill with granite masonry abutments for a short timber stringer span over Willett Brook.

Milepost 13.5: Sandy Creek - agent's station with passing siding serving a sawmill.

Milepost 15.8: Bridgton - had the largest population of any village served by the Maine 2 ft (610 mm) gauge railroads. The yard was on the stub of a wye with branches to Harrison and Bridgton Junction. There were 2 storage sidings and 4 spurs serving the agent's station, a separate freight house, a team track, an oil distributor, a grain store, the B&SR shop, and a turntable with a 4-stall enginehouse.

Milepost 15.9: Farmers Market - two northbound spurs (one was a coal trestle.)

Milepost 16.4: Forest Mills—passing siding with a northbound coal trestle spur.

Milepost 19.5: North Bridgton - agent's station with passing siding serving a separate freight house.

Milepost 20.7: Harrison - agent's station with a passing siding and several southbound spurs serving a freight house, a cannery, a grain store, a 2-track car shed, and a turntable with a single-stall enginehouse.

== Master Mechanic Caswell ==
Bridgton machine shop foreman Millard M. "Mel" Caswell was born in 1850. He took an early interest in mechanical affairs of the proposed railroad and served as master mechanic for the B&SR until he retired in 1926. He remained interested in the railroad and frequently attended the railfan excursions of the 1930s. His son, Wilfred H. Caswell, was born in 1876 and shared his father's mechanical aptitude. Wilfred Caswell was the engineer assigned to the construction train for the Harrison extension in 1898. Wilfred was the Portland Company mechanical engineer who supervised construction of the first Maine narrow gauge Forney locomotive with a pilot truck (B&SR locomotive number 5) in 1906. Wilfred then served as a consulting engineer for Baldwin Locomotive Works during construction of B&SR locomotive number 6 and an identical locomotive for the Sandy River Railroad. In May 1909 Wilfred became master mechanic of the Sandy River and Rangeley Lakes Railroad (SR&RL). Wilfred's early recognition of the technical value of photography produced excellent photographic documentation of SR&RL operations through the period of Maine Central Railroad ownership. When SR&RL profits declined in 1922, Wilfred and his wife Blanche, who had been the SR&RL book-keeper, moved to Dedham, Massachusetts, where Wilfred worked for the New York, New Haven and Hartford Railroad.

== Locomotives ==
Number	Builder	Type	Date	Works number	Notes
1	Hinkley Locomotive Works	0-4-4T Forney locomotive	10/1882	1563	Scrapped 1913
2	Hinkley Locomotive Works	0-4-4T Forney locomotive	10/1882	1564	Sold to the Wiscasset, Waterville and Farmington Railway in 1907
3	Portland Company	0-4-4T Forney locomotive	4/1892	624	Sold to the Kennebec Central Railroad in 1922
Bo-Peep	Hinkley Locomotive Works	0-4-4T Forney locomotive	1877	1261	Temporarily leased from the Phillips and Rangeley Railroad in 1893 while fire-damaged B&SR engines 1 and 3 were repaired.
4	H. K. Porter, Inc	0-4-4T Forney locomotive	8/1901	2360	Retired 1927
5	Portland Company	2-4-4T Forney locomotive	11/1906	628	Retired 1927
6	Baldwin Locomotive Works	2-4-4T Forney locomotive	9/1907	31827	Retired 1935
7	Baldwin Locomotive Works	2-4-4T Forney locomotive	12/1913	40864	Sold to Ellis D. Atwood for use at the Edaville Railroad in 1941. Operable. It operated its first trips during Steam Fest on May 19, 2018, at the Maine Narrow Gauge Railroad Co. & Museum. Currently at the WW&F.
8	Baldwin Locomotive Works	2-4-4T Forney locomotive	3/1924	57659	Sold to Ellis D. Atwood for use at the Edaville Railroad in 1941. Stored, awaiting restoration at the Maine Narrow Gauge Railroad Co. & Museum. No. 8 is the largest Maine 2 footer locomotive in existence, heavier than even the 2-6-2's on the SR&RL railroad. Currently stored at the WW&F.
9	Plymouth Locomotive Works	10 ton diesel	1930s		Bought from the Silver Lake Railroad in New Hampshire 2022, will be rebuilt with a new prime mover and regauged to 2ft gauge

== Rolling stock ==
Number	Builder	Type	Date	Length	Capacity	Notes
10	Laconia Car Company	baggage car	1882	41 feet (12.50 m)	no seats	renumbered #31
11	Jackson & Sharpe	baggage-RPO	1900	41 feet 9 inches (12.73 m)	6 passengers	renumbered #30 3-door Baggage/RPO later converted by Edaville to Baggage/Coach, and later again to Coach. Located at Boothbay Railway Village, Boothbay ME
15	Laconia Car Company	coach	1882	41 feet (12.50 m)	28 passengers	
16	Laconia Car Company	coach	1882	41 feet (12.50 m)	28 passengers	
17	Laconia Car Company	coach	1904	42 feet 9 inches (13.03 m)	28 passengers	named "Elthea" on Edaville Railroad
18	Jackson & Sharpe	coach	1894	39 feet 9 inches (12.12 m)	28 passengers	purchased from Wiscasset, Waterville and Farmington Railway in 1911. preserved at the WW&F Railway Museum, restored as Wiscasset and Quebec #3
25	Portland Terminal Company	RPO-smoking car	1913	42 feet 9 inches (13.03 m)	30 passengers	badly damaged in a collision with locomotive #7 in the Bridgton yard about 1927. The larger smoking compartment was rebuilt to carry express with a single baggage door on only one side of the car; and the smaller RPO compartment was rebuilt with a few seats to carry passengers. The car was sold for use as a restaurant in 1935. The appearance of locomotive #7 was permanently changed by replacement of a smaller number plate on the front of the boiler.
101	Laconia Car Company	caboose	1882	26 feet (7.92 m)	5 passengers	
2-7	Portland Terminal Company	flat cars	1916	34 feet (10.36 m)	15 short tons (13 long tons; 14 t)	the largest flat cars on any 2 ft (610 mm) gauge railway in Maine.
8-10	Portland Terminal Company	flat cars	1915	34 feet (10.36 m)	15 short tons (13 long tons; 14 t)	the largest flat cars on any 2 ft (610 mm) gauge railway in Maine.
11-13	Portland Terminal Company	flat cars	1913	34 feet (10.36 m)	15 tons	the largest flat cars on any 2 ft (610 mm) gauge railway in Maine.
14-21	Portland Company	flat cars	1903	30 feet (9.14 m)	15 tons	Flat car #21 was fitted with a 3,000-US-gallon (2,500 imp gal; 11,000 L) oil tank for the Standard Oil Company of New York in 1920. The tank was later transferred to flat car #14 when #21 was scrapped.
22	Portland Company	flat cars	1899	28 feet (8.53 m)	10 tons	fitted with a 2,500-US-gallon (2,100 imp gal; 9,500 L) oil tank for the Standard Oil Company in 1901. Cars #22 and #21/14 were the only 2 ft (610 mm) gauge tank cars in Maine.
23	Portland Company	flat cars	1899	28 feet (8.53 m)	10 tons	parts used by Edaville to construct open car #202
24-27	Portland Company	flat cars	1899	28 feet (8.53 m)	10 tons	
28-33	Portland Company	flat cars	1891	28 feet (8.53 m)	10 tons	
34	B&SR	flat car	1889	26 feet (7.92 m)	10 tons	Preserved at WW&F
35-44	Laconia Car Company	flat cars	1882	26 feet (7.92 m)	10 tons	Flat cars #35, 38, and 41-42 were rebuilt by B&SR to a length of 28 feet (8.5 m) when they required repairs. Flat car #40 was rebuilt as a flanger.
45-49	Laconia Car Company	box cars	1882	26 feet (7.92 m)	10 tons	
50-51	B&SR	box cars	1889	26 feet (7.92 m)	10 tons	
52-54	Portland Company	box cars	1895	28 feet (8.53 m)	10 tons	car 54 converted by Edaville to excursion car, leased by SR&RL, Phillips, ME
55-58	Portland Company	box cars	1898	28 feet (8.53 m)	10 tons	Box cars #56-58 had two small hinged doors on either side which could be opened as windows when transporting livestock.
59-62	Portland Company	box cars	1900	30 feet (9.14 m)	15 tons	the first 30-foot (9.1 m) freight cars built for any 2 ft (610 mm) gauge railroad in Maine.
63-68	Laconia Car Company	box cars	1905	30 feet (9.14 m)	15 tons	
69-70	B&SR	box cars	1906	30 feet (9.14 m)	15 tons	
71-73	Portland Terminal Company	box cars	1913	34 feet (10.36 m)	15 tons	the largest box cars on any 2 ft (610 mm) gauge railway in Maine.
