= Phillips and Rangeley Railroad =

Railroad in Maine

Overview
- Headquarters: Phillips
- Locale: Maine
- Dates of operation: 1891–1908
- Successor: Sandy River and Rangeley Lakes Railroad

Technical
- Track gauge: 2 ft (610 mm)
- Length: 28 miles (45 km)

The Phillips and Rangeley Railroad was a 2 ft (610 mm) narrow gauge common carrier railroad in the State of Maine.

It connected the towns of Phillips and Rangeley and was built to serve the forestry and resort industries of Franklin County. This railroad pioneered the use of large 2 ft (610 mm) gauge rolling stock in North America. Earlier freight cars built for the Billerica and Bedford Railroad, the Sandy River Railroad, the Bridgton and Saco River Railroad, the Monson Railroad, the Franklin and Megantic Railroad, and the Kennebec Central Railroad had a maximum length of 26 feet (7.9 m).

Phillips and Rangeley Railroad ordered the first 28-foot (8.5 m) cars in 1890 and the subsidiary Eustis Railroad ordered the first 33-foot (10 m) cars in 1903. The Portland Company locomotive built in 1890 was 12.5% heavier than any previous 2 ft (610 mm) gauge locomotive in Maine. The 2-6-0 locomotive purchased from Baldwin Locomotive Works the following year was 28% heavier than the Portland locomotive; and its success encouraged subsequent purchase of similar locomotives by the Laurel River and Hot Springs Railroad of North Carolina in 1892, the Sandy River Railroad in 1893, the Cazadero and San Pablo Railroad in 1897, the South African Cape Government Railways in 1901, the Córdoba and Huatusco Railroad in 1902, and the Wiscasset, Waterville and Farmington Railway in 1907.

== Early history ==
Owners of the Phillips and Rangeley Railroad (P&R) were most interested in a means of transporting lumber to markets from the aboriginal spruce forests of Redington township. Redington Lumber Company owned 375 of the 400 shares of P&R stock sold. Construction began where the Sandy River Railroad ended in Phillips; and the first train reached Redington on 11 October 1890. After leaving Reeds Mills, the railroad climbed 800 feet up nine roadless miles of Orbeton Stream canyon between Saddleback Mountain and Mount Abraham. Redington sawmill was built near the summit of what came to be called Sluice Hill. Although no station buildings had been constructed, the P&R commenced regular train service to Redington a few days before the mill started producing lumber on 21 February 1891. Frozen ground halted construction for the winter, but spring weather brought rails to Rangeley on 10 June 1891. On 1 July 1891, scheduled train service commenced from Rangeley to the Maine Central Railroad in Farmington via the Sandy River Railroad from Phillips.

P&R locomotive #1 was the first 2 ft (610 mm) gauge locomotive built by the Portland Company. It was the largest 2 ft (610 mm) gauge locomotive in Maine when delivered. P&R #2 locomotive was purchased from the Sandy River Railroad and kept the Sandy River number although it was available for construction work before #1 was delivered. P&R #3 locomotive was even larger than #1, and was the first locomotive with a separate tender on Maine's 2 ft (610 mm) gauge railroads. Initial P&R purchases of 16 box cars, 3 coaches, and one combination car matched Sandy River Railroad inventories of those car types for joint service; but P&R had seventy flat cars to ship lumber from Redington and from Sanders sawmill. P&R #1 and identical Sandy River engine #4 generally pulled passenger trains between Farmington and Rangeley, while P&R #3 pulled freight trains from the sawmills. For the third time, P&R ordered the heaviest 2 ft (610 mm) gauge locomotive in Maine to replace #2 in 1893. The old Hinkley locomotive was too small to provide satisfactory service on Sluice Hill when the larger locomotives needed repairs, but it was renumbered #4, renamed Bo-Peep, and remained on the roster for less demanding work. P&R received a baggage-RPO car from Portland in 1892; and the Sandy River Railroad put a similar car into service the following year.

The Redington sawmill closed briefly in 1895. Although the P&R grade up Sluice Hill was well positioned to receive logs sluiced off the flank of Mount Abraham, there was a limited supply of timber left within easy reach of the railroad. Workers began to move away from the boom town of Redington. P&R made no further rolling stock purchases. A box car and 3 flat cars were destroyed when Sanders sawmill burned in 1900. Redington was virtually deserted by that time. Rangeley Lakes trout fishing was legendary, and the population of deer increased as wild berry bushes grew on cutover timberland. The Rangeley Lake House, a large wooden hotel on the lakeshore near Rangeley, offered luxury accommodation for tourists interested in fishing and hunting; but their summer and autumn business did not cover the cost of railroad maintenance through the winter and spring.

== Madrid Railroad ==
The P&R was in difficult financial circumstances when branch lines were needed to reach nearby timberlands. Berlin Mills purchased the Redington sawmill machinery and moved it into a new mill at Madrid Junction in 1902. The P&R formed the 2 ft (610 mm) narrow gauge Madrid Railroad in 1902 to build a branch line from the new sawmill to aboriginal spruce forests in Township #6. P&R management held controlling stock in the Madrid Railroad and issued bonds to cover costs. The Madrid Railroad was promptly leased to the P&R and operated as a P&R branch line upon completion. No rolling stock was owned by the Madrid Railroad.

== Eustis Railroad ==
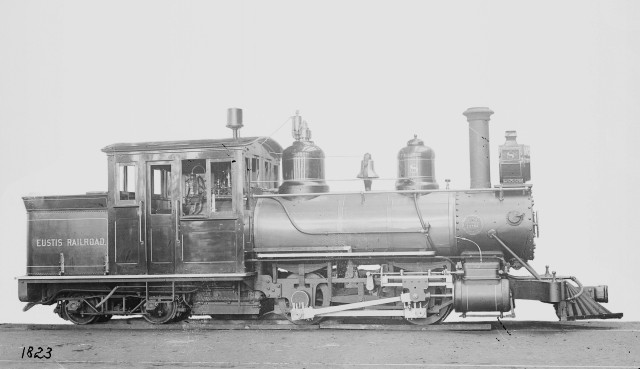
The three 'Eustis engines' Nos. 7, 8 and 9 were built by Baldwin in 1903 and 1904

The P&R needed cash to build a logging branch into aboriginal spruce forests north of their main line; but P&R's financial status was unattractive to investors. P&R management formed and kept controlling stock interest in the Eustis Railroad, and then issued Eustis Railroad bonds to cover the costs of building the branch and purchasing rolling stock. Portland Company built 25 flat cars for the Eustis Railroad. The flat cars were 33 feet (10 m) long and had a capacity of 12 tons. They were the largest 2 ft (610 mm) narrow gauge flat cars in Maine at the time. Construction of the branch began at Eustis Junction in May, 1903, and was completed in 1904. P&R management leased the Eustis Railroad to the P&R as soon as the branch was completed; and used the rolling stock for normal P&R operations. Summer-only passenger service from a resort at Green Farm connected with P&R trains at Eustis Junction.

Eustis locomotives carried numbers higher than the numbers of P&R locomotives. The Eustis locomotives were modernized versions of P&R locomotive #2 built in 1893. They were the heaviest 0-4-4T locomotives operated on any Maine 2 ft (610 mm) gauge railroad. The locomotives were destructive to the 35-pound steel rail used on the Eustis Railroad, but the P&R needed the branch only long enough to carry logs to Berlin Mills Madrid Junction sawmill.

== Declining sawmill operations ==
Trainloads of logs moved from the branches to Madrid Junction for the next few years, and trainloads of lumber moved south through Phillips and the Sandy River Railroad. In 1906, end-of-track at Rangeley was extended 1700 feet to serve Rangeley Lake House guests from a small stone lake-shore station on the hotel grounds.

Sandy River Railroad management began buying defaulted bonds of the P&R, Madrid, and Eustis railroads; and put the P&R into receivership in 1905. The Madrid Junction sawmill closed in 1908 when Franklin County's aboriginal spruce forests were virtually gone. Passenger service on the Eustis Railroad ended that year. Sandy River Railroad management forced auction of P&R properties to satisfy the defaulted bonds, purchased the P&R and Madrid railroads at that auction, and merged the P&R into their Sandy River and Rangeley Lakes Railroad in 1908.

The SR&RL had more difficulty obtaining title to the Eustis Railroad, but the receiver leased the Eustis Railroad to SR&RL when they purchased the P&R. Eustis Railroad was merged into the Sandy River and Rangeley Lakes Railroad (SR&RL) in 1911. The Eustis locomotives became SR&RL #20-22 and the Eustis flat cars became SR&RL #363-387.

== Geography ==
Milepost 0: Phillips - Connection with the Sandy River Railroad.

Milepost 5.4: Madrid Junction - Connection with the Madrid Railroad. Sawmill from 1903 to 1908.

Milepost 7.1: Reeds - Sawmill.

Milepost 9.6: Sanders - Sawmill from 1891 to 1900.

Milepost 16.2: Redington - Sawmill from 1891 to 1902.

Milepost 22.4: Eustis Junction - Connection with the Eustis Railroad.

Milepost 24.2: Dead River - Stage connections to Stratton and Eustis.

Milepost 28.6: Rangeley - Rangeley Lake House hotel.

== Locomotives ==
Number	Name	Builder	Type	Date	Works number	Weight	Notes
1	Calvin Putnam	Portland Company	0-4-4T Forney locomotive	10/1890	615	36,000 pounds (16 tonnes)	Became Sandy River and Rangeley Lakes Railroad No. 7
2	Izaak Walton	Hinkley Locomotive Works	0-4-4T Forney locomotive	1877	1261	23,750 pounds (11 tonnes)	Leased to the Bridgton and Saco River Railroad in 1893 where it became known as Bo-Peep to differentiate it from Bridgton engine 2 while fire-damaged Bridgton engines 1 and 3 were repaired. Renumbered 4 when returned to P&R service. Scrapped in 1912
3	George M. Goodwin	Baldwin Locomotive Works	2-6-0 tender	3/1891	11706	46,000 pounds (21 tonnes)	Became Sandy River and Rangeley Lakes Railroad No. 15
2nd #2		Baldwin Locomotive Works	0-4-4T Forney locomotive	3/1893	13276	51,500 pounds (23 tonnes)	Became Sandy River and Rangeley Lakes Railroad No. 17
7		Baldwin Locomotive Works	0-4-4T Forney locomotive	1903	23245	56,000 pounds (25 tonnes)	lettered for Eustis Railroad until 1911; became Sandy River and Rangeley Lakes Railroad No. 20
8		Baldwin Locomotive Works	0-4-4T Forney locomotive	1904	23754	56,000 pounds (25 tonnes)	lettered for Eustis Railroad until 1911; became Sandy River and Rangeley Lakes Railroad No. 21
9		Baldwin Locomotive Works	0-4-4T Forney locomotive	1904	23755	56,000 pounds (25 tonnes)	lettered for Eustis Railroad until 1911; became Sandy River and Rangeley Lakes Railroad No. 22
