= Monson Railroad =

Narrow gauge railway in Maine, US (1883–1943)

Overview
- Headquarters: Lowell, Massachusetts
- Locale: Maine
- Dates of operation: 1883–1943
- Successor: Abandoned

Technical
- Track gauge: 2 ft (610 mm)
- Length: 6 1/4 miles (10.06 km)

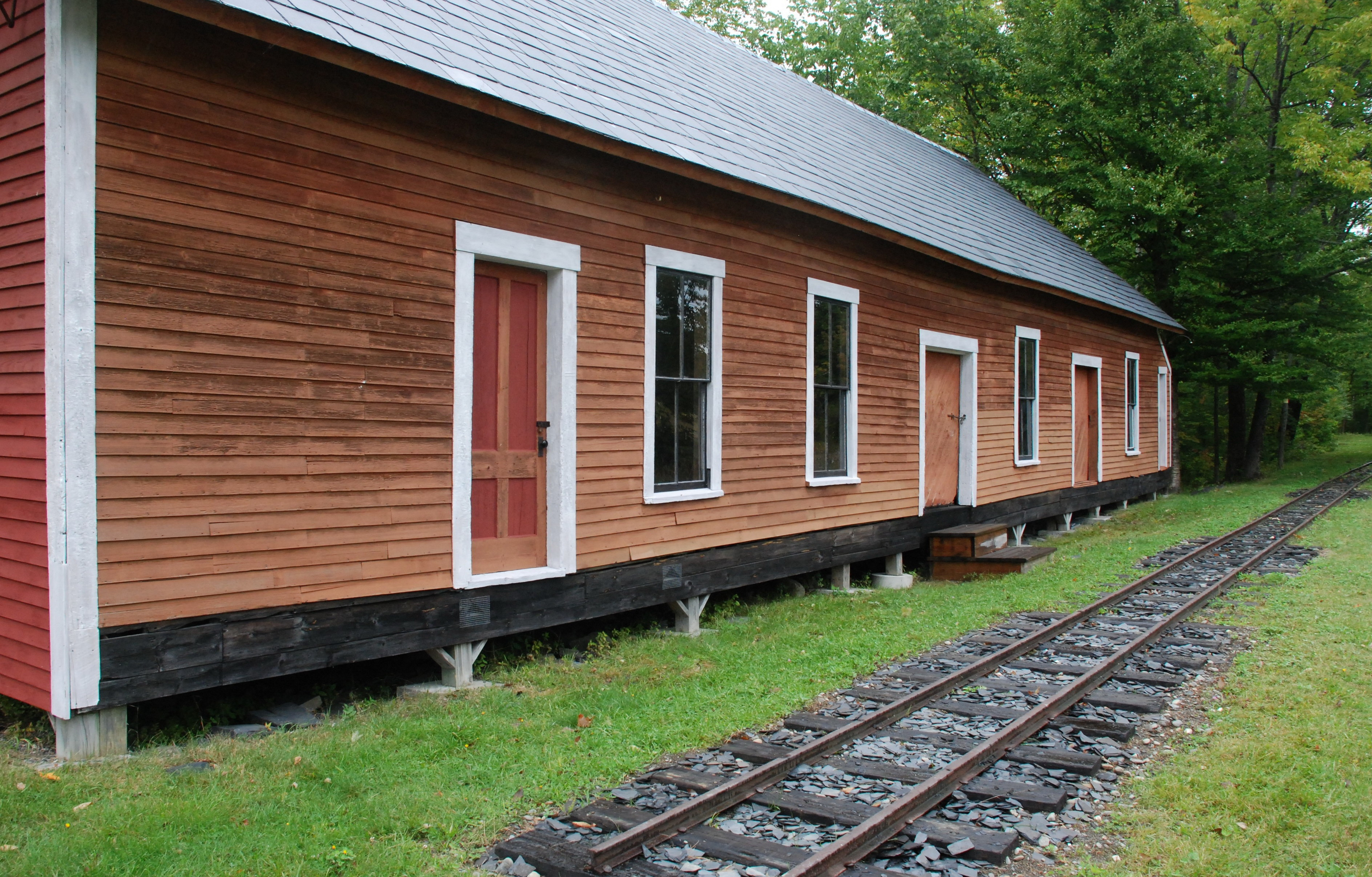
Monson station building and a short length of restored track, 2007

The Monson Railroad was a 2 ft (610 mm) narrow gauge railway, which operated between Monson Junction on the Bangor and Aroostook Railroad and Monson, Maine. The primary purpose of this railroad was to serve several slate mines and finishing houses in Monson. According to the Scientific American of 17 May 1890, it was the smallest railroad in the United States.

Equipment was never modernized, and the railroad used antique stub switches and link-and-pin couplers to the end of operations in 1943. The line was the last commercial carrier in the United States to use such couplers or to run above ground on a 2 ft (610 mm) gauge. (The 2 ft (610 mm) gauge Chicago Tunnel Company continued underground operation as a common carrier freight subway until 1959.)

== Construction ==
The slate underlying what became the town of Monson, Maine had very low ionizable mineral content, and was well suited for manufacture of electric switchboards. Quarrying commenced in the 1860s and slate finishing operations began in 1870. Slate was shaped into sinks, bathtubs, tabletops, chalkboards, roof shingles, and headstones. Transporting these heavy slate products was difficult in any weather, and became nearly impossible when spring thaw turned the roads to slush and mud.

The Monson and Athens Railroad Company was chartered 1 November 1882, when the standard gauge Bangor and Piscatquis Railroad (later part of the Bangor and Aroostook Railroad) bypassed Monson by six miles. The railroad was built with 30-pound (14.9 kg/m) rail in the summer of 1883, reached Monson on 4 September, and opened for business on 22 October.

Initial equipment consisted of two wood-burning locomotives from Hinkley Locomotive Works and two box cars, fourteen flat cars, and a combination from Laconia Car Company. The main line was promptly extended down a five percent grade to the Monson Slate Company approximately one mile (1.6 km) beyond the Monson village depot. A car shed for the combination and a two-stall engine house were built near the depot with a passing siding and a turntable. The turntables were a bit small for the locomotives, although they proved useful when a wedge snowplow arrived a few years later. Monson train crews found it much more convenient to run the locomotive in reverse for six miles than to wrestle it around on the turntables.

== Early common carrier operations ==
Four daily round trips were scheduled to meet each of the standard gauge trains. The Monson train crew consisted of an engineer, a conductor, and a fireman who doubled as brakeman. The train crew shoveled snow by hand for the first winter, and then fabricated a butterfly pilot plow in 1884. Two flat cars were converted to box cars during the first year of operations.

Athens was dropped from the railroad name on 18 February 1885, and the Monson Railroad requested legislative authorization to extend the main line sixteen miles (26 km) south from Monson Junction for connection with the standard gauge Sebasticook and Moosehead Railroad (later the Maine Central Railroad Harmony branch.) Legislative approval was granted, but funding was never available for the extension envisioning conversion to standard gauge railroad all the way to Monson.

The railroad acquired a wedge snowplow in 1888 to improve reliability of winter service. One of the flat cars was converted to a snow spreader in 1888 because the plow was unable to throw the snow far enough from the tracks. Four more flat cars were converted to box cars in 1891. Both locomotives were converted to burn coal about 1900. A coal transfer shed was built at Monson Junction, and the woodshed at Monson was henceforth used for storage of coal.

Portland Slate Company built a new mill on the Monson Main line in 1904, and six new flat cars were built by Laconia Car Company in 1905 to handle loadings from the new shipper. The additional traffic encouraged the Bangor and Aroostook Railroad to build a new freight transfer siding at Monson Junction in 1904.

== Monson Slate Company ownership ==
Monson Slate Company had been purchasing Monson Railroad stock for several years, and gained control of the railroad in 1908. Conductor Harold Morrill, who had started working for the railroad as fireman in 1884, was promoted to superintendent, but he continued to act as conductor through 1938. Track was extended with two miles (3.2 km) of 35-pound (17.4 kg/m) rail to Eighteen Quarry and Forest Quarry on Monson Pond in the summer and autumn 1909.

The Monson combination car carried 11,466 paying passengers in 1912, but superintendent Morrill observed that an automobile garaged in Monson was offering public conveyance and taking approximately 25 paying fares per week from the railroad. Both of the old Hinkley locomotives had serious boiler leaks, cracked cylinders, and/or broken frames since 1905, but they soldiered along until a new Vulcan locomotive arrived on 20 February 1913. Hinkley #2 never ran again, and #1 ran only on the rare occasions Vulcan #3 needed repairs.

In 1916 Monson's location provided an opportunity to purchase the longest freight cars operated by the railroad. The Sandy River Railroad shop at Phillips, Maine was rebuilding 185 older 2 ft (610 mm) gauge logging railroad flat cars into what became a fleet of 158 28-foot (8.53 m)-long flat cars of the Sandy River and Rangeley Lakes Railroad being purchased by the Maine Central Railroad in 1912. The Maine Central simultaneously contracted with Boyd and Harvey Lumber Company to cut railroad ties in the western Penobscot River drainage of the roadless Maine North Woods. The lumber company built the 2 ft (610 mm) gauge Carry Pond and Carry Brook Railroad in 1914 over the northwest carry from the eastern end of Seboomook Lake to Northwest Cove at the northern end of Moosehead Lake. Draft animals pulled two 28-foot-long flat cars over the railroad to deliver the ties to Moosehead Lake where they were floated across the lake for loading at Kineo Station on the northern end of the Maine Central Railroad Kineo Branch. After the ties had been delivered, the lumber company sold the two flat cars to the closest 2 ft (610 mm) gauge railroad at Monson.

The Monson Railroad purchased a couple of hand car trailers which could carry broken slate scraps from the quarries for use as ballast along the line. Within a few years, the Monson railroad became the only railroad in Maine with a completely rock-ballasted main line.

Arrival of the United States Railroad Administration in 1917 began a series of pointed reminders that Monson Railroad's oil headlights and link-and-pin couplers no longer met federal safety standards. The railroad kept the link-and-pin couplers for another quarter century of operations, but the oil headlights were removed when damaged by derailments. The locomotives thereafter ran without any headlights. Monson briefly considered a Davenport Locomotive Works 2-6-2 (similar to those being built for United States Army trench railways) before purchasing another Vulcan in 1918. Hinkley locomotive #1 was retired when the second Vulcan locomotive was delivered. Elimination of need for a source of spare Hinkley parts encouraged the innovative shop crew to strip old Hinkley #2 of all exterior fittings and attach a snowplow blade. Although the new snowplow was less likely to ride up on snow drifts, it was more likely to derail, so the old wedge plow remained in service.

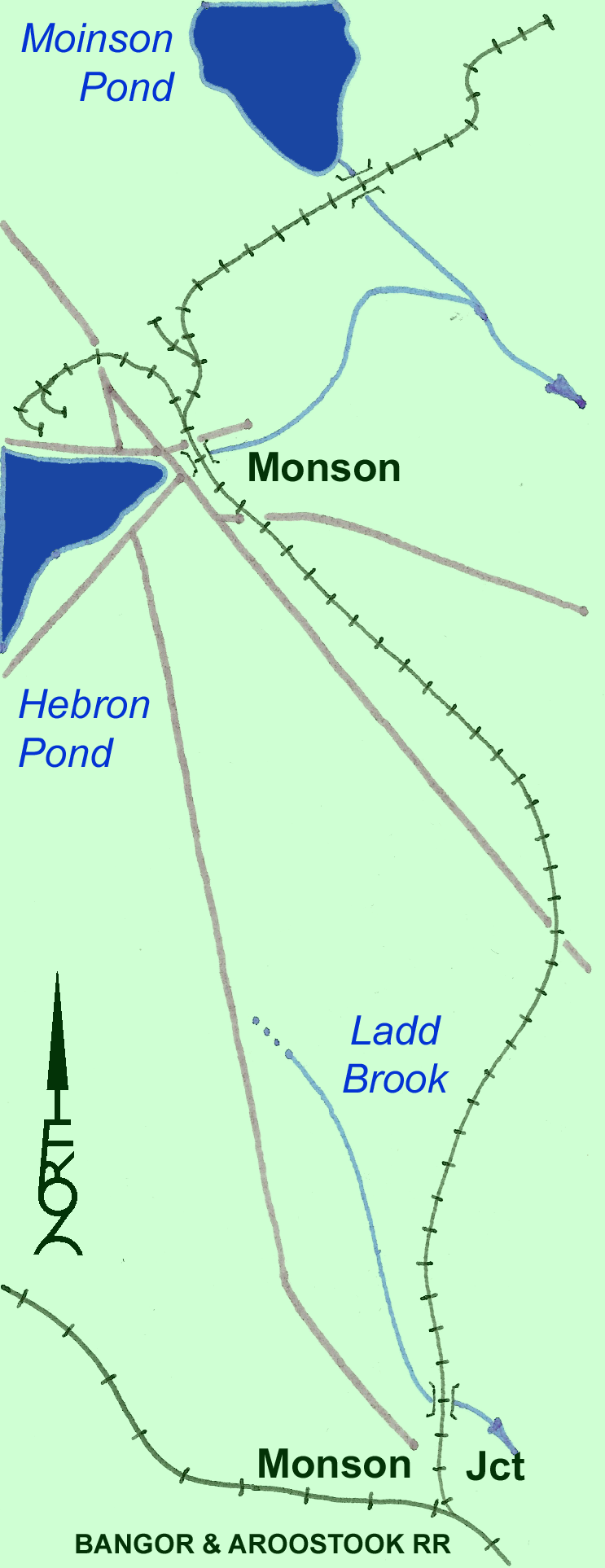
Map of Monson Railroad

== Decline of service ==
The Monson engine house burned on 3 November 1919. Vulcan locomotives 3 and 4 were damaged, and old Hinkley #1 was considered a total loss. A highway truck handled mail and express shipments for ten days until engine number 4 was repaired. Engine number 3 returned to service on 20 November, and the engine house was rebuilt in June 1920.

Under pressure from the Interstate Commerce Commission, Franklin firebox doors were installed on the locomotives, and an automobile headlight was connected to a six volt storage battery to serve as a headlight. Train service was reduced from four to two round trips per day effective 10 October 1921. The Monson Pond quarry extension was abandoned in 1922.

The track crew was laid off in 1933, and the train crew became responsible for right-of-way maintenance and freight transfer at Monson Junction. Locomotive #3 was the only operable engine after 1936. Passengers, mail, and express were carried in a slate company highway truck when the locomotive required repairs. Passenger service was discontinued on 1 November 1938.

Monson became the last of Maine's - and the nation's - 2 ft (610 mm) gauge railroads in commercial operation when the Bridgton and Saco River Railroad was dismantled in 1941. Infrequent flat car loads of crated slate products moved to Monson Junction until 12 July 1943. On that date Monson Slate Company received permission to use a highway truck for common carrier service. The railroad was dismantled during the winter of 1943-44 and the engine house became a garage for the truck.

Linwood Moody found Monson locomotives #3 and #4 in a Rochester, New York, used equipment yard in 1946. The two steam engines were shipped to the Edaville Railroad for restoration, and are still in operation at the Maine Narrow Gauge Railroad Co. & Museum in Portland, Maine.

== Locomotives ==
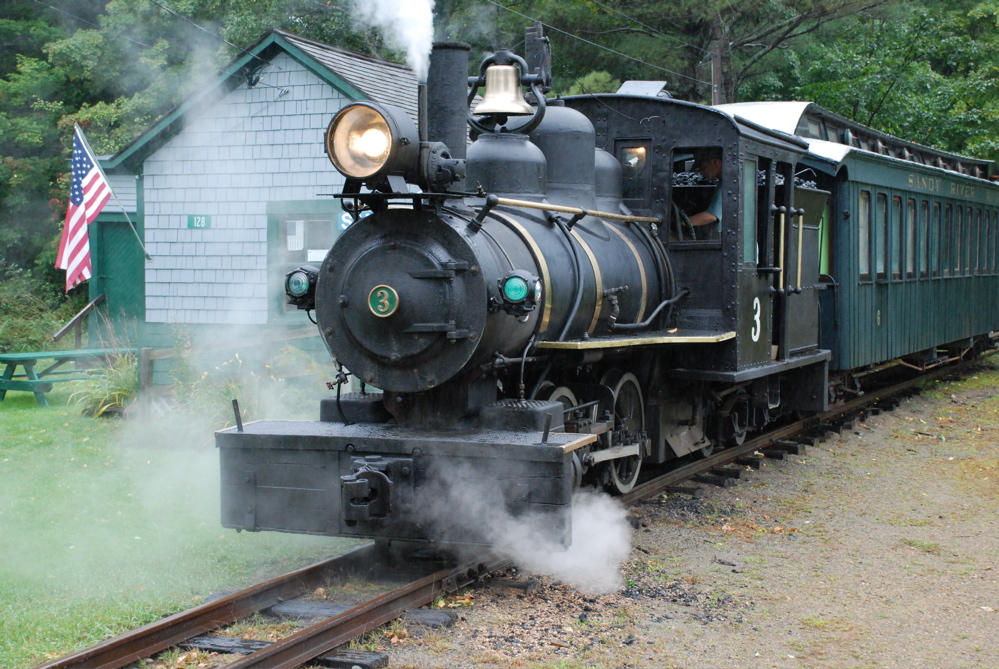
Monson Railroad #3 on loan to the SR&RL at Phillips in 2007

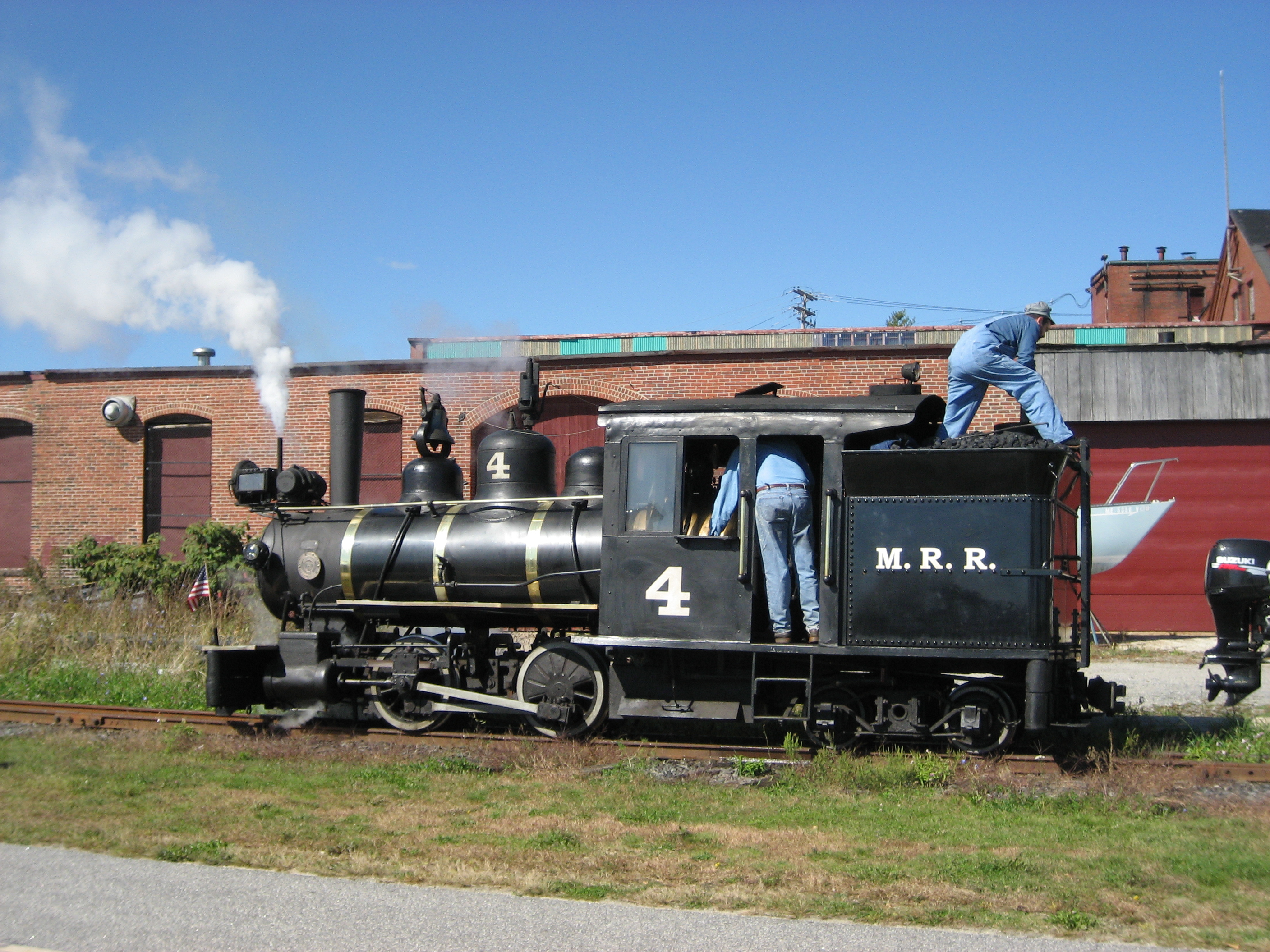
Monson Railroad #4 seen at the Maine Narrow Gauge Railroad Co. & Museum in 2006

Number	Builder	Type	Date	Works number	Notes
1	Hinkley Locomotive Works	0-4-4T Forney locomotive	1883	1621	Named H.A.Whiting. Scrapped 1919
2	Hinkley Locomotive Works	0-4-4T Forney locomotive	1884	1661	Named G.S.Cushing. Retired 1913, converted to a snowplow in 1918
3	Vulcan Iron Works	0-4-4T Forney locomotive	1912	2093	Operable. Owned by the Maine Narrow Gauge Railroad Co. & Museum, currently on loan to Edaville.
4	Vulcan Iron Works	0-4-4T Forney locomotive	1918	2780	Out of service in 2014. Owned by the Maine Narrow Gauge Railroad Co. & Museum, currently stored disassembled at the Wiscasset, Waterville and Farmington Railway. New boiler required.

== Rolling stock ==
Number	Builder	Type	Date	Length	Capacity
1	Laconia Car Company	combination	1883	29 feet	10 passengers
1-2	Laconia Car Company	box cars	1883	26 feet	8 tons
3-16	Laconia Car Company	flat cars	1883	25 feet	8 tons
17-22	Laconia Car Company	flat cars	1905	26 feet	11 tons
23-24		flat cars	1916	28 feet	11 tons
		wedge snowplow	1888	24 feet	
