= Portland Terminal Company =

Terminal railroad in Maine, U.S.

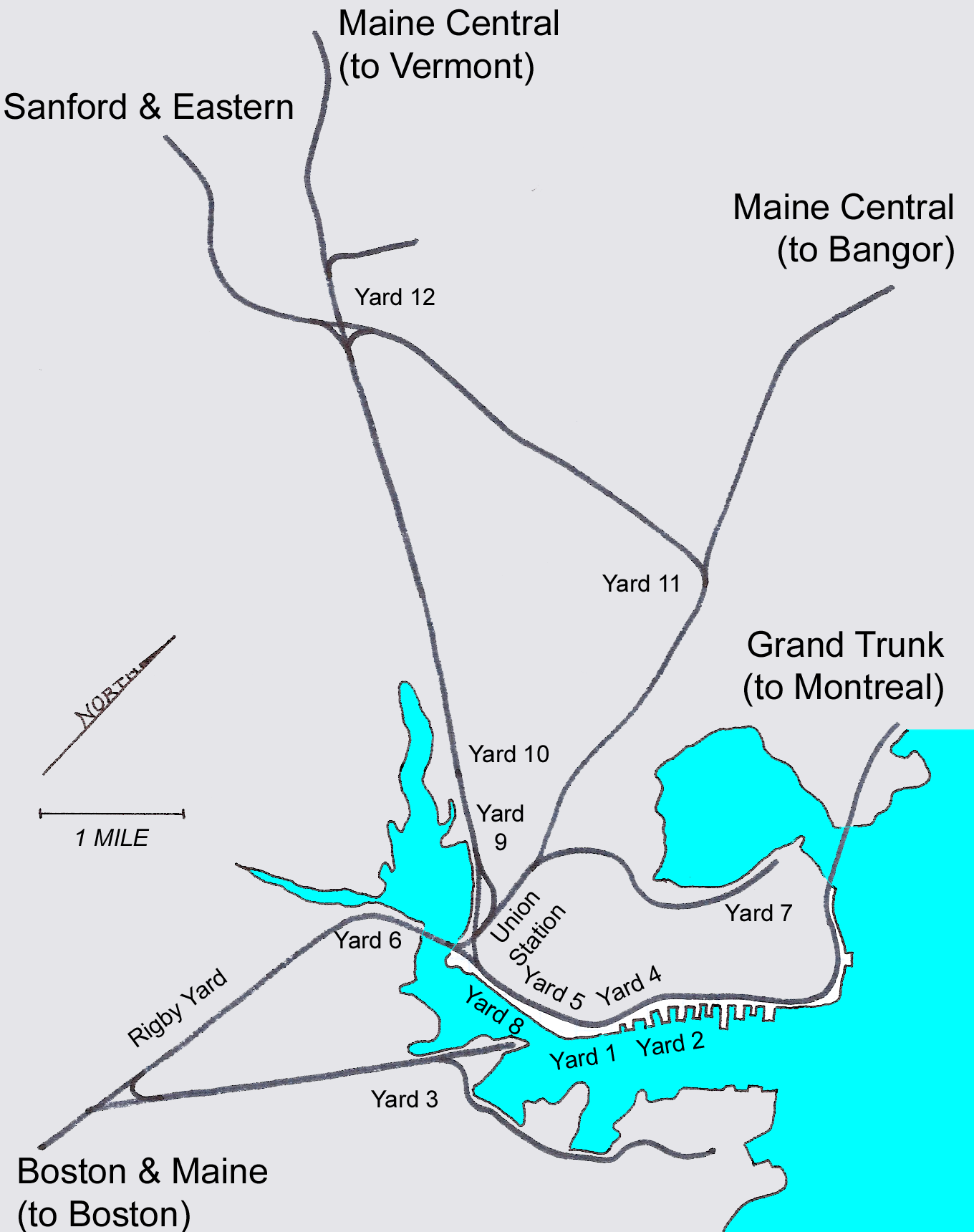
- Map of the Portland Terminal Company and connecting lines, circa 1960

Overview
- Headquarters: Portland, Maine
- Reporting mark: PTM
- Locale: Maine
- Dates of operation: 1911–1981
- Successor: Guilford Transportation Industries

Technical
- Track gauge: 4 ft 8 1/2 in (1,435 mm) standard gauge

The Portland Terminal Company (reporting mark PTM) was a terminal railroad notable for its control of switching (shunting) activity for the Maine Central Railroad (MEC) and Boston & Maine (B&M) railroads in the Maine cities of Portland, South Portland, and Westbrook.

== History ==
The Maine Central Railroad (MEC) came under the control of the Boston & Maine Railroad (B&M) in 1884. The New Haven Railroad secured control of the B&M in 1907, and the Portland Terminal Company was formed in 1911 as part of the New Haven's consolidation of New England transportation facilities. Portland Terminal Company became a subsidiary of MEC while B&M was in financial difficulty in 1914.

PTM's activities were vital to Portland's role as a winter seaport receiving Canadian products from the Grand Trunk Railway for export to Europe. Shipping from Portland declined sharply as Canadian exports were routed via the Maritime ports of Saint John, New Brunswick and Halifax, Nova Scotia following nationalization of the Grand Trunk in 1923. Exports from Portland declined from 600,000 short tons (536,000 long tons; 544,000 t) per year in the early 1920s to 21,000 short tons (18,700 long tons; 19,100 t) per year during the worst year of the following depression. In the decade following World War II, PTM operated on 40 miles (64 km) of main lines and branch tracks, 84 miles (135 km) of yard tracks, and 18 miles (29 km) of industry-owned tracks. PTM was acquired by Guilford Transportation Industries in 1981, and continues as CSX Corporation

== Geography ==
Portland occupies an Atlantic coast peninsula between Back Cove to the north and the Fore River estuary to the south. The peninsula is protected from North Atlantic swells by the islands of Casco Bay. Back Cove was too shallow for 20th century ocean commerce. Portland Harbor is the seaward portion of the Fore River estuary.

South Portland occupies the southern shore of the Fore River estuary.

Westbrook is inland of Portland where the pre-railroad Cumberland and Oxford Canal provided transportation for mills using water power of the Presumpscot River.

Grand Trunk Railway from Montreal entered Portland from the north via a long trestle over the mouth of Back Cove. The Grand Trunk yard and wharves occupied the seaward end of the Portland Harbor waterfront along the north shore of the Fore River estuary. This line became the Berlin Subdivision of the Canadian National Railway when the Grand Trunk was nationalized in 1923. Access to the Portland waterfront ended when the Back Cove trestle burned in 1984; and the line to Montreal was sold to a short line operator in 1989.

Maine Central Railroad Portland Division from Bangor, Maine, entered Portland from the north inland of Back Cove.

Maine Central Railroad Mountain Division from St. Johnsbury, Vermont, entered Westbrook from the northwest paralleling the old canal along the Presumpscot River. The Mountain Division was abandoned in 1983.

Boston and Maine Railroad Worcester, Nashua and Portland Division from Rochester, New Hampshire, entered Westbrook from the west. The Boston & Maine discontinued passenger service in 1932 and through-freight service in 1934. The line operated as the Sanford and Eastern Railroad from 1949 until abandonment in 1961.

Boston and Maine Railroad Portland Division Eastern Route from Boston entered South Portland from the south, and was dismantled in 1945.

Boston and Maine Railroad Portland Division Western Route from Boston entered South Portland from the south.

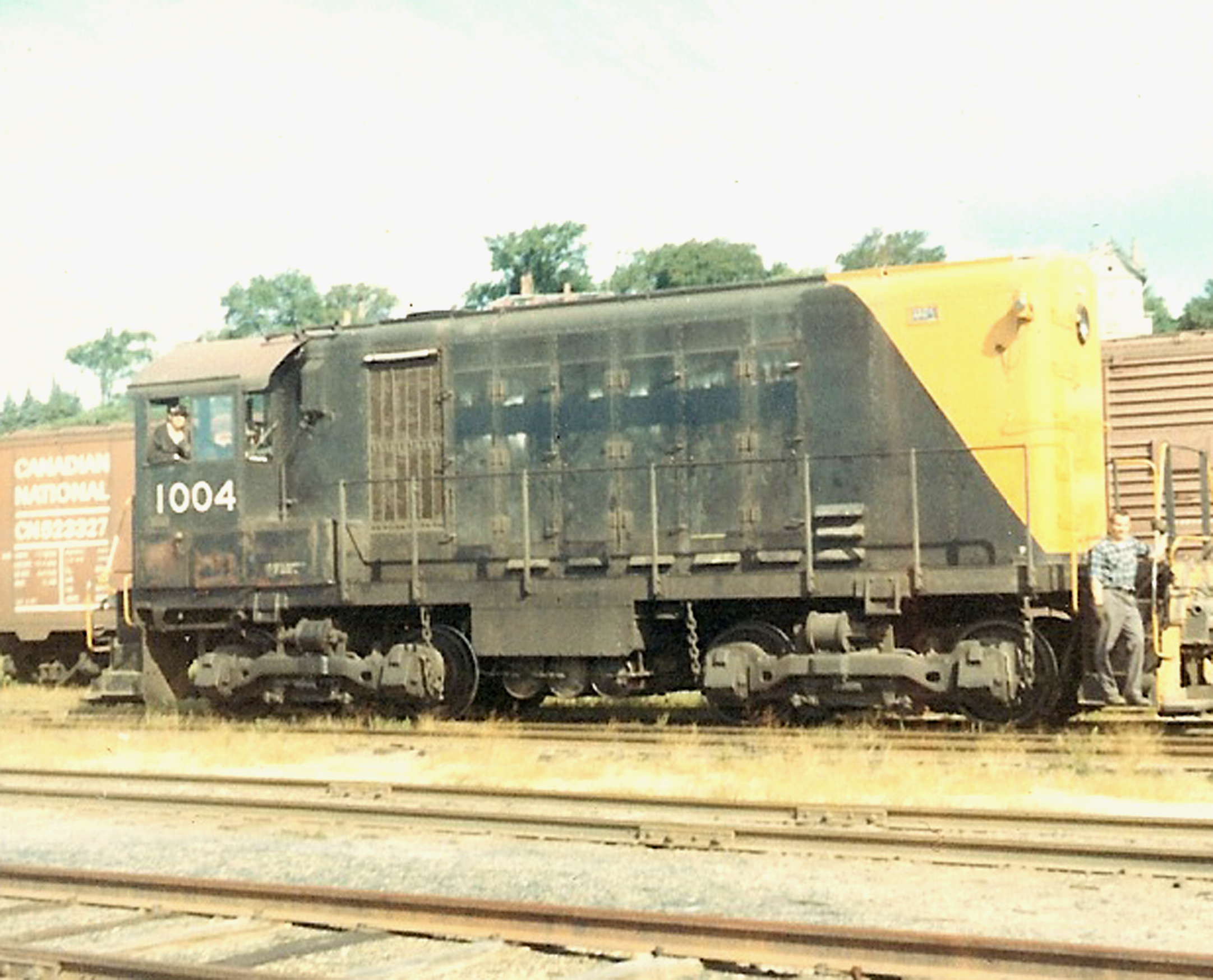
PTM HH600 #1004 working in Yard 5 during the summer of 1968.

Union Station had eastern and western yards along the Boston to Bangor main line between Rigby Yard and Yard 11. The PTM assembled trains in these yards and added mail and express cars to through trains. Following a 1933 joint operating agreement between the Maine Central and the Boston & Maine, passenger trains from Bangor and points east to Boston or Worcester, Massachusetts, and points south ran through Union Station with pooled equipment like the Gull and the Flying Yankee. Other Maine Central and Boston & Maine passenger trains originated or terminated at Union Station. Grand Trunk trains originated or terminated about 2 miles (3.2 km) east of Union Station without using Union Station. Union Station was razed in 1961.

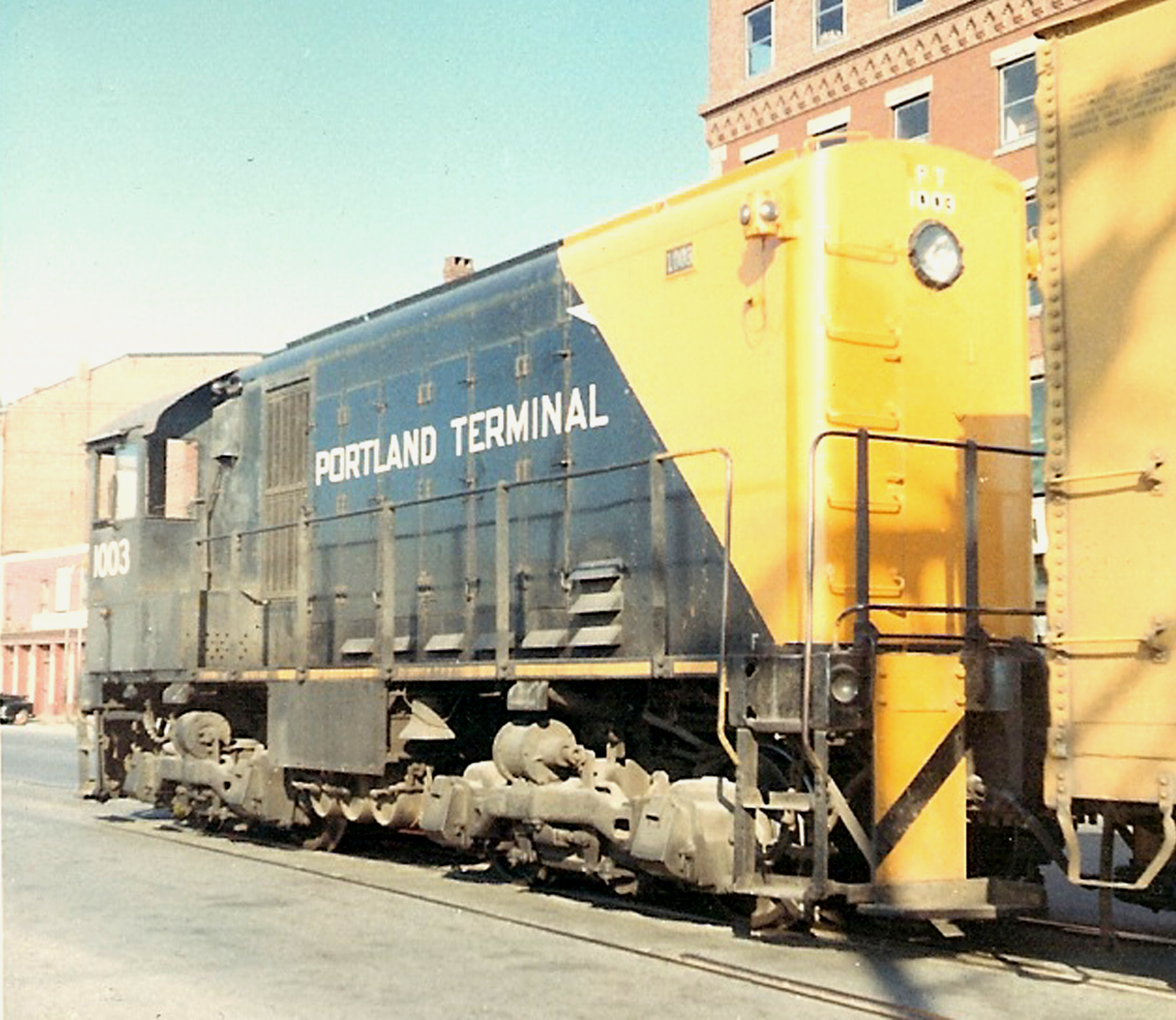
Portland Terminal Company working on Commercial Street (Yard 2) in the summer of 1968. The recently applied yellow nose was the third paint scheme for high-hood switcher #1003. The white triangle peeking out from behind the yellow is a remnant of the second paint scheme -- horizontal white and red nose stripes on the pattern of ALCO RS-2 demonstrator #1500. Boston and Maine Railroad bought the demonstrator, kept the number, and adopted the paint scheme (shared with Maine Central Railroad and PTM) for yard locomotives.

Yard 1 served PTM Wharf 1 on the Portland Harbor waterfront along the north shore of the Fore River estuary upstream of Yard 2 and downstream of yard 8. Wharf 1 had water frontage of 1,000 feet (300 m) and included a 100,000-square-foot (9,300 m^{2}) warehouse for handling package cargo interchanged with ships of up to 30-foot (9.1 m) draught.

Yard 2 served Portland Harbor waterfront wharves along the north shore of the Fore River estuary upstream of the Grand Trunk wharves and downstream of Wharf 1. Yard 2 became the local interchange with the Grand Trunk Railway after 1947.

Yard 3 along the original Boston & Maine eastern route served the South Portland waterfront of the Fore River estuary including PTM Wharf 4, the New England Shipbuilding Corporation and the Portland-Montreal Pipe Line terminal.

Yard 4 team tracks and less-than-carload (LCL) transfer facilities inland of Yard 1 and Yard 2.

Yard 5 car storage inland of Yard 8.

Yard 6 served petroleum bulk plants in South Portland north of Rigby Yard.

Yard 7 served distribution warehouses and light industries along the south shore of Back Cove. Yard 7 was the interchange with the Grand Trunk Railway until the Portland Junction connection was severed during construction of a highway bridge over the mouth of Back Cove in 1947.

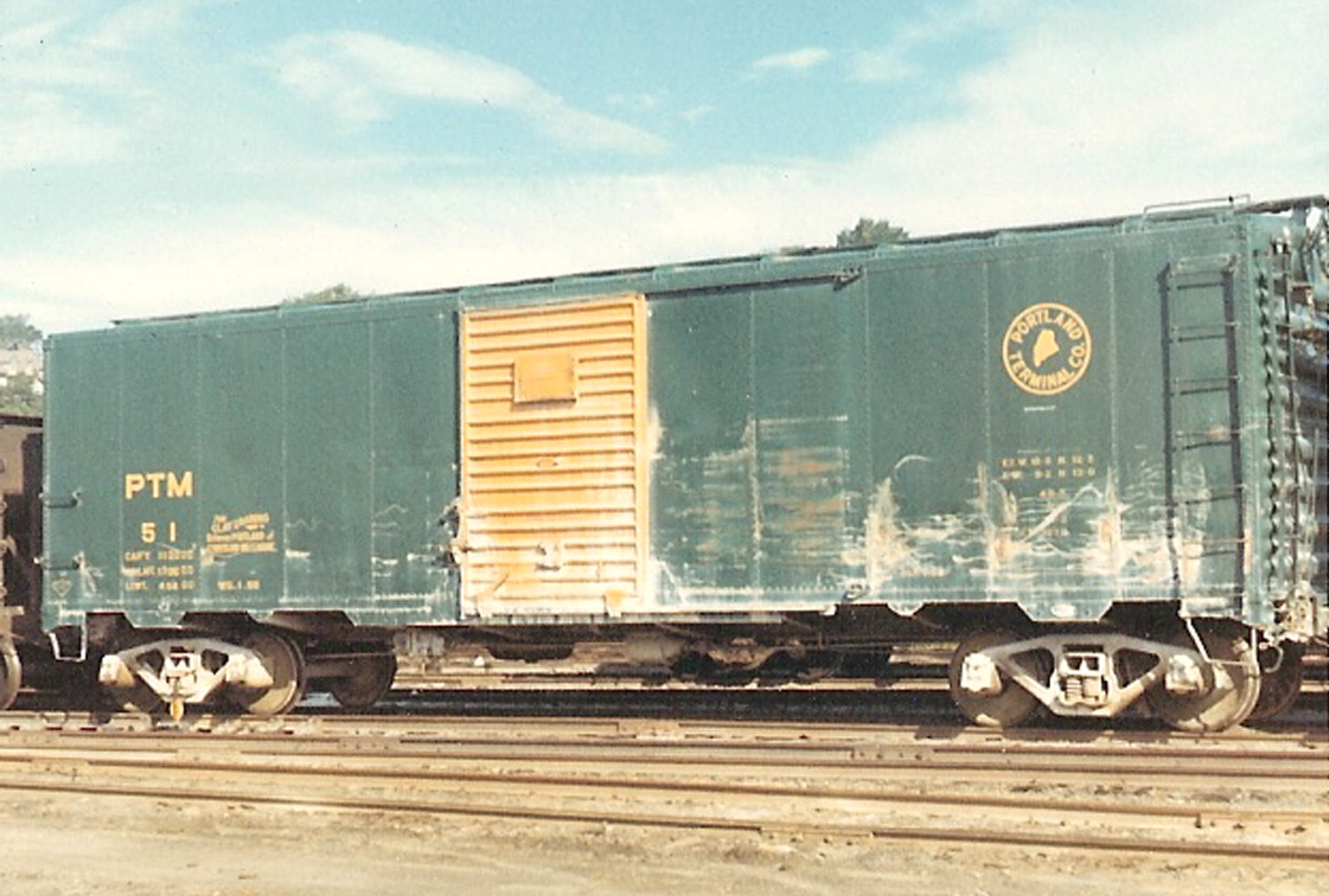
Portland Terminal Company boxcar #51 in china clay service at Portland, Maine Yard 8 in the summer of 1968

Yard 8 served PTM Wharf 3 on the Portland Harbor waterfront along the north shore of the Fore River estuary upstream of Yard 1. Wharf 3 had water frontage of 1,500 feet (460 m) designed for handling bulk commodities from ships and barges of up to 30-foot (9.1 m) draught. PTM #1601-1800 30-foot USRA hopper cars carried coal from this wharf to local industries. The wharf included a storage shed for 4000 tons of china clay transported to the Westbrook paper mill in PTM box cars. Maine Central 35000-series USRA 50-ton, 40-foot (12 m), single-sheathed box cars were repainted PTM #2001-2150 in 1956. Maine Central 4000-series 40-foot (12 m) steel box cars were repainted PTM #50-54 in 1966. Wharf 3 was closed about 1970. Yard 8 included the first piggyback ramp served by the Maine Central Railroad.

Yard 9 was the old Fore River Yard on the Mountain Division adjacent to the north shore of the Fore River estuary upstream of the dredged channel. Rigby Yard was enlarged to eliminate most activity in Yard 9.

Yard 10 served PTM's Thompson Point shops adjacent to the Mountain Division upstream of Yard 9. Thompson Point shops built 49 flat cars, 40 box cars, 3 cabooses, a baggage-RPO and a RPO-smoking car for the 2-foot (0.61 m) gauge Bridgton and Saco River Railroad and Sandy River and Rangeley Lakes Railroad between 1912 and 1917.

Yard 11 served large grocery distribution warehouses at Deering Junction where the Boston & Maine WN&P division joined the Maine Central main line to Bangor.

Yard 12 served the city of Westbrook including the S. D. Warren Paper Mill. 7,500 carloads originated or terminated in Westbrook in 1973.

Rigby Yard (Yard 13) was built in 1922 on the former site of Rigby Park at the South Portland junction of the eastern and western routes of Boston & Maine's Portland division. Rigby became the busiest New England rail yard north of Boston as car storage and locomotive servicing facilities were eliminated from older yards in Portland. Maine Central and Boston & Maine freight trains originated or terminated in Rigby Yard. Yard 12 became the interchange point for Sanford and Eastern trains.

Blue Rock Quarry was on the Mountain Division between Westbrook and Portland. Bethlehem Steel delivered 70-ton, 40-foot PTM hopper cars #101-150 in 1956 to replace the old USRA hoppers for coal loading. These cars were used for ballast service as heating oil minimized coal demand. Cars #101-122 were fitted with side extensions for off-line wood-chip loading on the Maine Central Railroad.

== Locomotives ==
| Number | Builder | Type | Date | Works number | Notes |
|---|---|---|---|---|---|
| 702 | Baldwin Locomotive Works | 4-6-4 | 1930 | 61371 | ex-Maine Central Railroad #702 acquired 1950 for use as a snow-melter Scrap 1955 |
| 801 | ALCO Manchester | 0-6-0 | 1902 | 26346 | ex-Maine Central Railroad #180 Scrap 1923 |
| 802 | ALCO Manchester | 0-6-0 | 1902 | 26347 | ex-Maine Central Railroad #181 Scrap 1924 |
| 803 | Schenectady Locomotive Works | 0-6-0 | 1900 | 5565 | ex-Maine Central Railroad #175 Scrap 1929 |
| 804 | Manchester Locomotive Works | 0-6-0 | 1899 | 1712 | ex-Boston and Maine Railroad #161 Scrap 1929 |
| 805 | Baldwin Locomotive Works | 0-6-0 | 1903 | 21454 | ex-Boston and Maine Railroad #192 Scrap 1929 |
| 806 | Baldwin Locomotive Works | 0-6-0 | 1903 | 21515 | ex-Boston and Maine Railroad #194 Scrap 1929 |
| 807 | ALCO Brooks | 0-6-0 | 1904 | 30327 | ex-Maine Central Railroad #183 Scrap 1939 |
| 808 | ALCO Brooks | 0-6-0 | 1904 | 30328 | ex-Maine Central Railroad #184 Scrap 1936 |
| 809 | ALCO Manchester | 0-6-0 | 1906 | 40580 | ex-Maine Central Railroad #185 Scrap 1936 |
| 810 | ALCO Manchester | 0-6-0 | 1906 | 40581 | ex-Maine Central Railroad #186 Scrap 1937 |
| 811 | ALCO Manchester | 0-6-0 | 1906 | 40582 | ex-Maine Central Railroad #187 Scrap 1939 |
| 820 | ALCO Manchester | 0-6-0 | 1909 | 46340 | ex-Boston and Maine Railroad #288 Scrap 1936 |
| 821 | ALCO Schenectady | 0-6-0 | 1910 | 49203 | ex-Maine Central Railroad #165 Scrap 1945 |
| 822 | ALCO Schenectady | 0-6-0 | 1910 | 49204 | ex-Maine Central Railroad #166 Sold 1943 to Todd-Bath Shipyard |
| 824 | ALCO Manchester | 0-6-0 | 1912 | 50737 | Scrap 1944 |
| 825 | ALCO Manchester | 0-6-0 | 1912 | 50738 | Scrap 1947 |
| 826 | ALCO Manchester | 0-6-0 | 1912 | 50739 | Scrap 1946 |
| 827 | ALCO Manchester | 0-6-0 | 1912 | 50740 | Scrap 1945 |
| 828 | ALCO Schenectady | 0-6-0 | 1913 | 52987 | Scrap 1950 |
| 829 | ALCO Schenectady | 0-6-0 | 1913 | 52988 | Scrap 1950 |
| 830 | ALCO Schenectady | 0-6-0 | 1917 | 57579 | sold to Boston and Maine Railroad in 1951 |
| 831 | ALCO Schenectady | 0-6-0 | 1917 | 57580 | sold to Boston and Maine Railroad in 1951 |
| 832 | ALCO Schenectady | 0-6-0 | 1918 | 59867 | sold to Boston and Maine Railroad in 1951 |
| 833 | ALCO Schenectady | 0-6-0 | 1918 | 59868 | Scrap 1951 |
| 834 | ALCO Schenectady | 0-6-0 | 1920 | 62202 | sold to Boston and Maine Railroad in 1951 |
| 835 | ALCO Schenectady | 0-6-0 | 1920 | 62203 | Scrap 1950 |
| 850 | Portland Company | 4-4-0 | 1887 | 545 | ex-Maine Central Railroad #64 Scrap 1917 |
| 850 | Rhode Island Locomotive Works | 4-4-0 | 1885 | 1546 | ex-Maine Central Railroad #55 Purchased 1917. Scrap 1928 |
| 851 | ALCO Schenectady | 0-8-0 | 1916 | 56566 | ex-Boston and Maine Railroad #600 Scrap 1951 |
| 852 | ALCO Schenectady | 0-8-0 | 1916 | 56567 | ex-Boston and Maine Railroad #601 Scrap 1951 |
| 1001 | ALCO | HH600 | 1936 | 68730 | scrapped 1961 |
| 1002 | ALCO | HH600 | 1936 | 68731 | scrapped 1967 |
| 1003 | ALCO | HH600 | 1936 | 68732 | scrapped 1969 |
| 1004 | ALCO | HH600 | 1938 | 69071 | scrapped 1973 |
| 1005 | ALCO | S-1 | 1941 | 69494 | scrapped 1977 |
| 1006 | ALCO | S-1 | 1945 | 73083 | sold 1976 to GE |
| 1007 | ALCO | S-1 | 1949 | 77111 | scrapped 1984 |
| 1008 | ALCO | S-1 | 1949 | 77112 | sold 1981 to North Stratford Railroad |
| 1051 | ALCO | S-2 | 1941 | 69565 | scrapped 1982 |
| 1052 | ALCO | S-2 | 1943 | 70244 | sold 1982 to Bay Colony Railroad |
| 1053 | ALCO | S-2 | 1946 | 73902 | retired 1980 |
| 1054 | ALCO | S-2 | 1949 | 76596 | scrapped 1984 |
| 1055 | ALCO | S-4 | 1950 | 78416 | sold 1981 to Conway Scenic Railroad, and sold in 2010 to the Downeast Scenic Railroad |
| 1056 | ALCO | S-4 | 1950 | 78417 | retired 1982 |
| 1057 | ALCO | S-4 | 1950 | 78418 | scrapped 1982 |
| 1058 | ALCO | S-4 | 1950 | 78419 | sold 1982 to Bay Colony Railroad |
| 1061 | ALCO | S-4 | 1950 | 78235 | ex-Delaware and Hudson Railroad #3041 purchased 1967 sold 1983 to Bay Colony Railroad |
| 1062 | ALCO | S-4 | 1950 | 78239 | ex-Delaware and Hudson Railroad #3045 purchased 1967 sold 1981 to Fore River Railroad |
| 1063 | ALCO | S-4 | 1950 | 78406 | ex-Delaware and Hudson Railroad #3047 purchased 1968 sold 1983 to Bay Colony Railroad |
| 1081 | EMD | GP7 | 1950 | 13533 | Used as a Boston and Maine Railroad mileage equalizer on Boston commuter trains until renumbered Maine Central Railroad #581 in 1956 |
| 1082 | ALCO | RS-11 | 1956 | 81917 | renumbered Maine Central Railroad #802 in 1956 |
| 1101 | ALCO | S-3 | 1950 | 78393 | ex-Greater Portland Public Development Commission #661 acquired in 1958 and was the last locomotive to wear PTM paint when sold in 1988. |
