= Sandy River and Rangeley Lakes Railroad =

Narrow gauge railroad in Franklin County, Maine

Sandy River & Rangeley Lakes Railroad
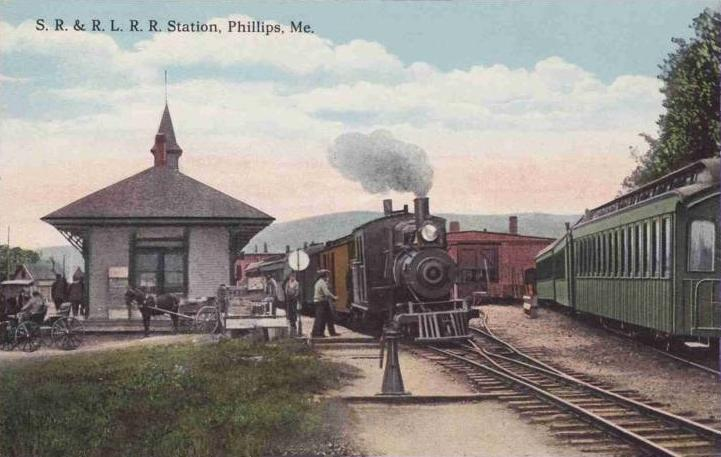
- Depot at Phillips c. 1912

Overview
- Headquarters: Phillips
- Locale: Phillips, Maine, U.S.
- Dates of operation: 1908–1935
- Successor: abandoned

Technical
- Track gauge: 2 ft (610 mm)
- Length: 112 mi (180 km)

Other
- Website: https://www.srrl-rr.org

The Sandy River and Rangeley Lakes Railroad (SR&RL) was a 2 ft (610 mm) narrow gauge common carrier railroad that operated approximately 112 miles (180 km) of track in Franklin County, Maine. The former equipment from the SR&RL continues to operate in the present day on a revived, short segment of the railway in Phillips, Maine.

== History ==
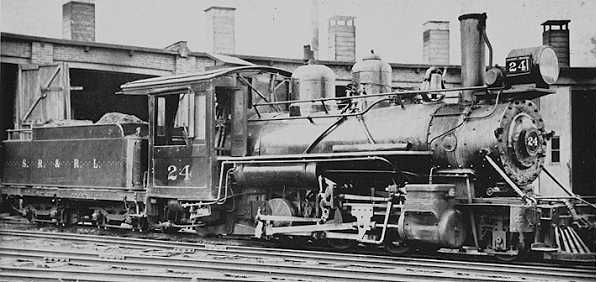
2-6-2 No.24 of the Sandy River & Rangeley Lakes Railroad

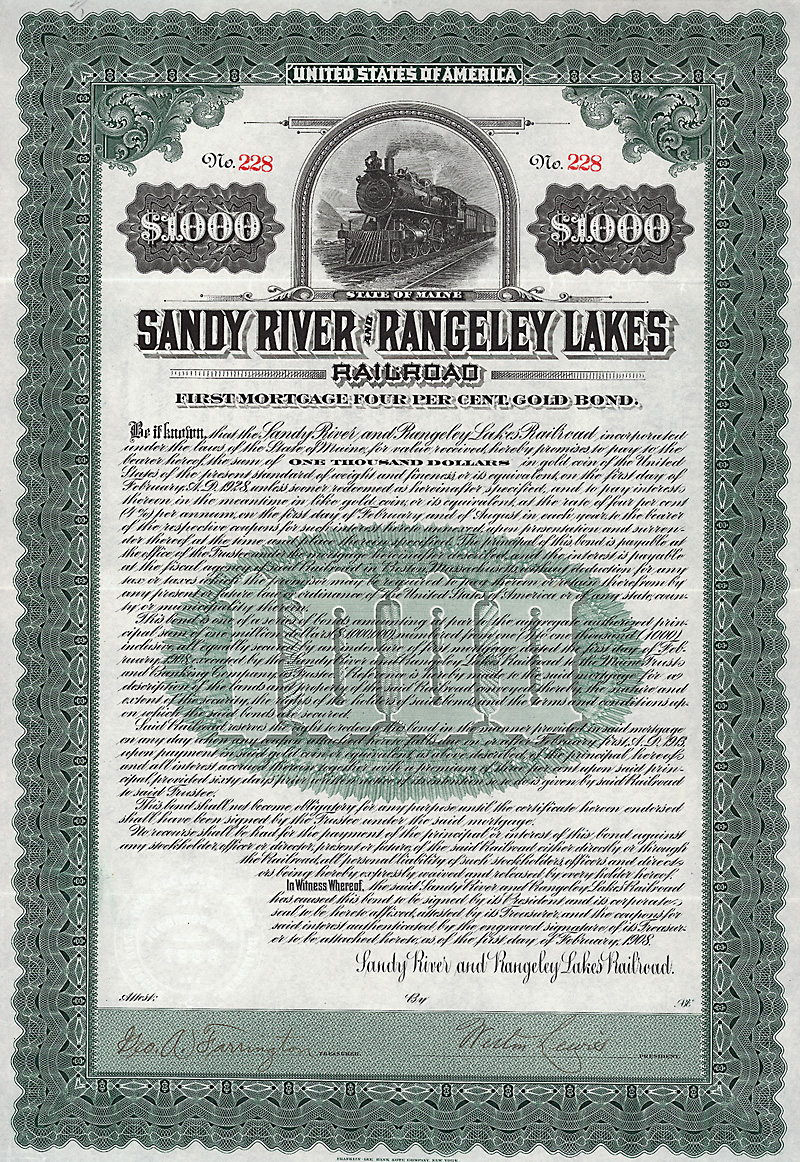
Bond of the Sandy River and Rangeley Lakes Railroad, issued 1 February 1908

Josiah S. Maxcy, a Gardiner banker who had recently financed construction of the Kennebec Central Railroad, obtained legislative approval for consolidation of the Sandy River Railroad and Phillips and Rangeley Railroad (P&R) on 10 March 1891. Maxcy purchased controlling stock of the Sandy River Railroad in 1892, and then obtained controlling stock of the Franklin and Megantic Railway (F&M) in 1897. Under Maxcy's direction, F&M purchased the Kingfield and Dead River Railway (K&DR) at auction on 2 August 1898; and the F&M, K&DR, and Sandy River railroads operated under common management until formally merged as the SR&RL in January 1908. Under Maxcy's direction, SR&RL purchased the Phillips & Rangeley Railroad (P&R) and the Madrid Railroad at auction on 12 June 1908 and the Eustis Railroad at auction on 24 August 1911.

== Maine Central control ==
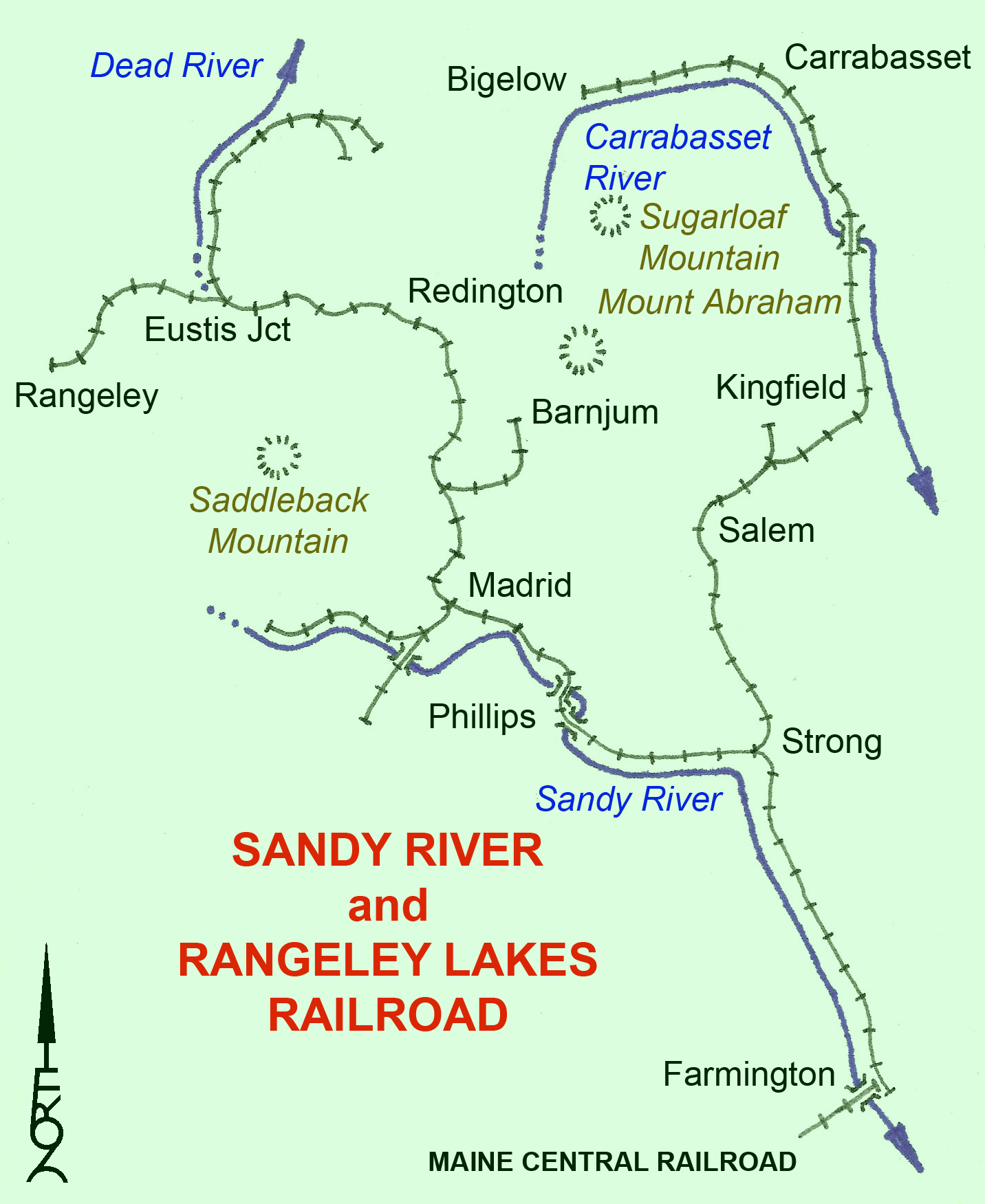

As part of the New England transportation monopoly organized by the New York, New Haven and Hartford Railroad, the SR&RL operated as a subsidiary of the Maine Central Railroad from 1912 until receivership in 1923. Maine Central built 37 box cars, 37 flat cars, 3 cabooses and a baggage-RPO car in their Portland Terminal Company shops for the SR&RL between 1912 and 1917. SR&RL locomotives 15, 16, 17 and 18 were reboilered in the Maine Central Waterville shops during the same period, and a 4-mile (6.4 km) freight branch was built from Perham Junction to Barnjum.

Outbound lumber traffic declined from 50,000 tons in 1906 to 11,000 tons in 1919. Pulpwood traffic increased as smaller spruce trees were harvested. The Phillips shop converted two-thirds of the flat cars for loading with 4-foot-long (1.2 meter) pulpwood logs by installing high, slatted sides and ends loosely resembling a stock car with doors and roof removed.

Federal railway post office service between Farmington and Phillips ended 13 March 1917. Freight traffic peaked at 157,809 tons in 1919; but 84 percent of that freight was pulpwood, and demand for pulpwood declined dramatically when federal paper contracts were canceled at the end of World War I. 1919 was the last year of service on the three miles of the former Eustis Railroad beyond Langtown.

Various curtailments of winter service were tried over the following years to reduce operating costs. Winter service was discontinued on the former K&DR north of Kingfield from 21 December 1921 to 1 May 1922. Winter service on the former P&R was discontinued from 15 December 1922 to 1 May 1923. Eight of the railroad's thirteen operational locomotives were damaged when the Phillips roundhouse burned on 12 February 1923. Josiah Maxcy and Kingfield mill and hotel owner Herbert Wing were appointed receivers when bond interest went unpaid.

== Receivership ==
The receivers took control on 8 July 1923 and discontinued freight service north of Perham Junction on the former P&R from 24 November 1923 until 1 June 1924, but passenger train service was continued over the entire system through that winter. For the next five years, winter freight and passenger service on the former P&R north of Phillips was discontinued from December through May. The former F&M remained in service for receiver Wing's mill in Kingfield, and for a Carrabasset wood veneer mill built by the Lawrence Plywood Company in 1924. The veneer mill used surplus World War I tanks to haul logs out of the woods.

The Phillips shop built internal combustion railcars numbered 3 and 4 in the spring of 1925. These passenger rail motors substituted for steam passenger trains during the summer months until October when snow and ice removal required daily operation of steam locomotives with pony plows. Railcar number 5 was built during the winter of 1926-27.

Rails were removed from the 1.9-mile (3-km) Mount Abram Branch to Soule's Mill in November 1924 and from the northern 4.4 miles (7 kilometers) of the former K&DR from Carrabasset to Bigelow in the summer of 1926. In 1927, rails were removed from the P&R extension formerly serving the Rangeley Lake House hotel.

In 1928 Oxford Paper Company began shipping pulpwood from Barnjum to their mill in Rumford Falls. The receivers operated extra winter trains to Barnjum, and were encouraged to resume full year service over the former P&R commencing 20 May 1929. The last steam train left Rangeley in May 1931 and railcar service over the former P&R north of Phillips ended in the autumn of 1931. Following a precedent set three years earlier on the Kennebec Central Railroad, Maxcy suspended all train and railcar service when the last mills shipping their products via the SR&RL transferred their business to highway trucking firms. Two SR&RL highway trucks began carrying express shipments on 8 July 1932, and no trains operated over any part of the railroad through the following winter.

== Dismantling ==
After observing reliability of winter truck traffic over Maine State Route 16, the Lawrence Plywood Company petitioned the railroad to resume service from their Carrabasset mill to Farmington. Operations resumed on 17 April 1933, with sale of unused equipment as scrap to meet operating costs. Dismantling of the former P&R began during the summer of 1934, but service to Phillips was required to reach the railroad machine shops; so the receivers petitioned for abandonment when rail removal reached Phillips in April 1935. A scrap metal firm purchased the railroad at auction in May and service ended on 2 July 1935. Remaining rails were lifted for scrap metal in 1936.

== Revival ==
Sandy River & Rangeley Lakes Railroad
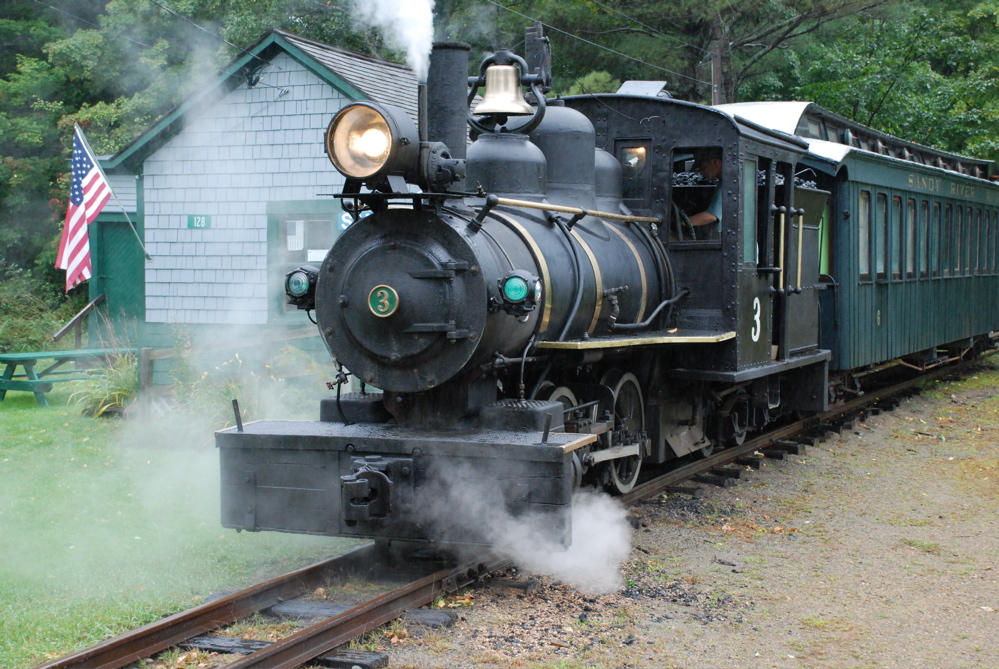
- Monson Railroad #3 at Phillips station, June 2007

Overview
- Headquarters: Phillips
- Locale: Phillips, Maine, U.S.
- Dates of operation: 1970–present

Technical
- Track gauge: 2 ft (610 mm)
- Length: 3 mi (4.8 km)

Other
- Website: https://www.srrl-rr.org

In 1970, a group of local railfans at the Phillips Historical Society formed a project to document the SR&RL. This group eventually formed a separate non-profit organization, the "Sandy River and Rangeley Lakes Railroad", to preserve remaining equipment from the railroad. As of 2023, the non-profit heritage railroad on the trackbed of the original SR&RL at Phillips continues to operate today.

== Locomotives ==
Number	Builder	Type	Date	Works number	Notes
1	Hinkley Locomotive Works	0-4-4T Forney locomotive	1877	1251	ex-Sandy River Railroad No. 1. Scrapped 1912.
2	Hinkley Locomotive Works	0-4-4T Forney locomotive	1877	1261	ex-Phillips and Rangeley Railroad No. 4. Scrapped 1912.
3	Hinkley Locomotive Works	0-4-4T Forney locomotive	1884	1664	ex-Franklin and Megantic Railway No. 1. Scrapped 1912.
4	Baldwin Locomotive Works	0-4-4T Forney locomotive	1886	8304	ex-Franklin and Megantic Railway No. 2. Scrapped 1912.
5	Portland Company	0-4-4T Forney locomotive	1890	616	ex-Sandy River Railroad No. 4. Scrapped 1919.
6	Portland Company	0-4-4T Forney locomotive	1891	622	ex-Sandy River Railroad No. 5; sold to the Kennebec Central Railroad 1925; preserved as WW&F #9
7	Portland Company	0-4-4T Forney locomotive	1890	615	ex-Phillips and Rangeley Railroad No. 1.
8	Baldwin Locomotive Works	2-4-4T Forney locomotive	1907	31826	Ordered for the Sandy River Railroad but delivered to the SR&RL. Burned 1923.
9	Baldwin Locomotive Works	2-4-4T Forney locomotive	1909	33550	Built new for the SR&RL. Scrapped 1936.
10	Baldwin Locomotive Works	2-4-4T Forney locomotive	1916	42231	Built new for the SR&RL. Used on the Farmington to Rangeley main line only. Scrapped 1936.
15	Baldwin Locomotive Works	2-6-0 tender	1891	11706	ex-Phillips and Rangeley Railroad No. 3; rebuilt in 1912 as a 2-6-2. Retired 1923.
16	Baldwin Locomotive Works	2-6-0 tender	1892	12964	ex-Sandy River Railroad No. 6; rebuilt in 1915 as a 2-6-2. Scrapped 1935.
17	Baldwin Locomotive Works	0-4-4T Forney locomotive	1893	13276	ex-Phillips and Rangeley Railroad No. 2. Scrapped 1936.
18	Baldwin Locomotive Works	2-6-0 tender	1893	13733	ex-Sandy River Railroad 2nd No. 2. Rebuilt in 1916 as a 2-6-2. New tender built by Baldwin Locomotive Works in 1926. The last locomotive to run on the SR&RL. Scrapped 1936.
19	Baldwin Locomotive Works	2-6-2 tender	1904	23874	ex-Sandy River Railroad No. 8. Scrapped 1935.
20	Baldwin Locomotive Works	0-4-4T Forney locomotive	1903	23245	ex Eustis Railroad No. 7. Wrecked 1922.
21	Baldwin Locomotive Works	0-4-4T Forney locomotive	1904	23754	ex Eustis Railroad No. 8. Scrapped 1935.
22	Baldwin Locomotive Works	0-4-4T Forney locomotive	1904	23755	ex Eustis Railroad No. 9. Scrapped 1935.
23	Baldwin Locomotive Works	2-6-2 tender	1913	40733	Built new for the SR&RL. Used on the Farmington to Phillips main line only. Scrapped 1936.
24	Baldwin Locomotive Works	2-6-2 tender	1919	51803	Built new for the SR&RL. Scrapped 1937.

== See also ==
- Maine Narrow Gauge Railroad Co. & Museum
- Brecon Mountain Railway
- Sandy River and Rangeley Lakes Railroad - heritage operation in Phillips
- Narrow-gauge railroads in the United States
