= Franklin and Megantic Railway =

Railway line in Maine

Overview
- Headquarters: Strong
- Locale: Maine
- Dates of operation: 1884–1908
- Successor: Sandy River and Rangeley Lakes Railroad

Technical
- Track gauge: 2 ft (610 mm)
- Length: 14.5 mi (23.3 km)

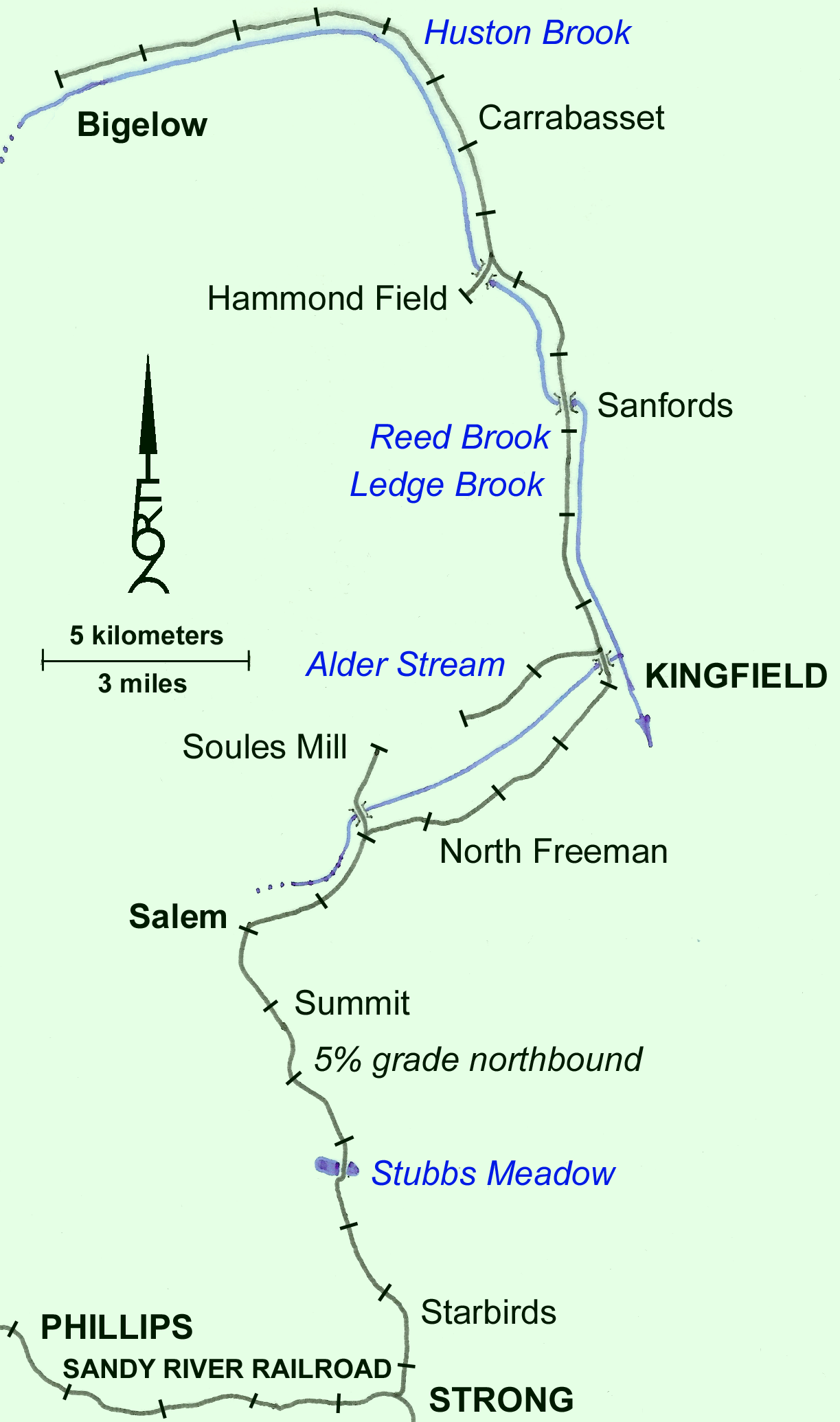
Map of the Franklin and Megantic Railway circa 1906.

The Franklin and Megantic Railway (F&M) (original name "Franklin and Megantic Railroad") was a 2 ft (610 mm) narrow gauge railway in northern Maine that branches off from the Sandy River Railroad (SRR) at Strong and served sawmills in Salem township and in the town of Kingfield.

== History ==
The F&M was constructed in 1884 to reach aboriginal spruce forests on the south slope of Mount Abraham. The 1.8-mile (2.9 km) Mount Abram branch was constructed to Soule's sawmill in 1886. In 1894, the F&M formed the 2 ft (610 mm) narrow gauge Kingfield and Dead River Railroad (K&DR) to extend rails up the Carrabassett River from Kingfield to Carrabassett. At that time, the F&M owned 2 locomotives, 7 box cars, 21 flat cars, 40-foot (12.19 m) combination car #1 built by the Laconia Car Company in 1885, and 20-foot (6.1 m) baggage car #2 (renumbered #4 in 1903) built by the Portland Company in 1887.

The company was renamed to "Franklin and Megantic Railway" in 1897 due to financial problems. The owners of the Sandy River Railroad purchased controlling interest in the F&M in 1898. In 1899 the line was extended to a large sawmill in Crockertown (later called Bigelow), as close to the Canadian town of Megantic as it would reach. Twenty new flat cars were purchased from the Portland Company in 1900. Four of the new flat cars and one F&M box car were destroyed when the sawmill burned in 1903. F&M received two 40-foot (12.19 m) long passenger cars from American Car and Foundry Company in 1903. Coach #2 and combination #3 were built in a joint order with an identical coach (SR #8) for the Sandy River Railroad.

In 1906 a temporary trestle was constructed over the Carrabassett River to the Hammond Field log yard where timber from the west side of the river was loaded for transport to the Bigelow sawmill. Log trains shuttled back and forth to the sawmill until the trestle washed out in November 1907. Logging service was rough on equipment, and 22 F&M flat cars were scrapped the following year. A crude passenger shelter was constructed adjacent to the main line for woodsmen involved in the logging. Rapid transformation of the landscape during this brief period of activity evoked memories of a local American Civil War veteran who named the shelter Shiloh Number Two.

F&M locomotives were renumbered in 1905 to avoid confusion with Sandy River locomotives frequently working on the F&M. The F&M was merged into the Sandy River and Rangeley Lakes Railroad (SR&RLRR or SR&RL) in 1908. The Maine Central Railroad took control of the SR&RL in 1911.

Franklin and Megantic Railroad (Main Line)

Technical
- Line length: 48 km (30 mi)
- Track gauge: 2 ft (610 mm)

F&M combination #1 became SR&RL #11

F&M coach #2 became SR&RL #21

F&M combination #3 became SR&RL #14

F&M baggage #4 became SR&RL #6 (but was scrapped and replaced by a new baggage-RPO #6 in 1912)

Fifteen of the 28-foot (8.5 m) flat cars built in 1900 were renumbered for SR&RL; but the remaining F&M freight cars were scrapped by 1911

== Geography ==
Milepost 0: Strong - Connection with the Sandy River Railroad.

Milepost 1.0: Starbird's sawmill.

Milepost 6.2: Summit - Passing siding and covered water tank at the high point between Strong and Kingfield.

Milepost 8.0: Salem - Agent's station and sawmill. The original covered station burned in 1899 and was replaced with a new building in 1901.

Milepost 10.2: Mount Abram Junction - Branch line to Soule's sawmill.

Milepost 14.9: Kingfield - Covered agent's station, 3-stall enginehouse, and hardwood turning mills.

Milepost 19.2: Bridge over Carrabassett River. (on K&DR extension)

Milepost 21.5: Hammond Field. One-half mile branch line to a log loading yard. (on K&DR extension)

Milepost 24.1: Carrabassett - Agent's station with stage connections to Stratton and Eustis until railroad extended to Bigelow. (on K&DR extension)

Milepost 30.2: Bigelow - Agent's station and sawmill (on K&DR extension)

== Locomotives ==
Number	Name	Builder	Type	Date	Works number	Notes
1	B.V. Meade	Hinkley Locomotive Works	0-4-4T Forney locomotive	1884	1664	Renumbered #2 in June 1905 and became SR&RL #3 in 1908
2	S.W. Sargent	Baldwin Locomotive Works	0-4-4T Forney locomotive	1886	8304	Renumbered #3 in June 1905 and became SR&RL #4 in 1908
