= Sandy River Railroad =

Overview
- Headquarters: Farmington
- Locale: Maine
- Dates of operation: 1879–1908
- Successor: Sandy River and Rangeley Lakes Railroad

Technical
- Track gauge: 2 ft (610 mm)

The Sandy River Railroad was a 2 ft (610 mm) narrow gauge railway built to serve the towns of Strong and Phillips in the Sandy River valley upstream of Farmington. The Sandy River Railroad was the first narrow gauge common carrier railroad built in the State of Maine.

== History ==
The railroad was built from Farmington through Strong to Phillips in 1879 using rolling stock of the recently abandoned Billerica and Bedford Railroad. The original Billerica and Bedford equipment consisted of 2 locomotives, 6 flat cars, a baggage car, a coach, a combination car, and 2 box cars rebuilt from open excursion cars. In 1883 the railroad purchased 2 coaches from Laconia Car Company and a third locomotive in anticipation of additional traffic to be generated by the Franklin and Megantic Railroad (F&M) being built from Strong to Kingfield. In 1890 the railroad sold locomotive #2 to the Phillips and Rangeley Railroad (P&R) being built from Phillips to Rangeley, and purchased 2 new locomotives to deal with the additional traffic from that line.

In 1893, the Sandy River Railroad purchased a larger 2-6-0 mogul locomotive to carry bridge traffic from the connecting F&M and P&R railroads, and purchased a baggage-RPO car for the Farmington-Rangeley passenger trains it operated jointly with the P&R. Locomotive #3 was sold to the Wiscasset and Quebec Railroad in 1894. The Sandy River Railroad had 16 box cars and 13 flat cars in 1894, and ordered 4 box cars and 8 flat cars from the Portland Company that year. Portland Company delivered 10 more box cars and 10 more flat cars in 1897. The Sandy River Railroad had Jackson & Sharpe build the parlor car "Rangeley" in 1901 for wealthy tourists traveling to Rangeley via narrow gauge passenger trains. It was the only 2 ft (610 mm) gauge parlor car in the United States.

Sandy River management obtained a controlling interest in the F&M in 1898; and Sandy River locomotive #5 became a regular feature on F&M freight trains. In 1900, the Sandy River purchased a 2-6-0 locomotive and 6 flat cars formerly owned by the Laurel River and Hot Springs Railroad of North Carolina. The mogul started pulling F&M freight trains, and locomotive #5 became the regular passenger train engine on the F&M. American Car and Foundry Company built 3 passenger cars for the Sandy River and the F&M in 1903. A coach and combination were lettered for the F&M while a second coach was lettered Sandy River #8. Following delivery of these cars, the standard F&M passenger train became a combination and a coach. Seating in the combination was designated a smoking car for passengers who wished to use tobacco.

The Sandy River Railroad began building its own freight cars in the Phillips shop in 1902. Ten box cars and 44 flat cars were built through 1903. The railroad then built caboose #12 in 1904 from the hardware of a P&R coach burned at Green Farm on the Eustis Railroad that year. Cabooses #10-11 were built the following year to a different design. The Sandy River and the F&M renumbered their locomotives in 1905 to avoid confusion. Sandy River moguls #2-3 became #6-7 while F&M engines #1-2 moved into the #2-3. Sandy River locomotive #8 had been delivered in 1904. It was the first 2 ft (610 mm) gauge 2-6-2 locomotive in Maine, and was intended to pull the long trainloads of lumber being delivered to the Sandy River from the large sawmills in Bigelow on the F&M and Madrid Junction on the P&R.

Sandy River management began purchasing defaulted bonds of the P&R and its subsidiary Madrid Railroad and Eustis Railroad; and put the P&R into receivership in 1905. Sandy River management then forced auction of the properties to satisfy the defaulted bonds, purchased the P&R and Madrid Railroad at that auction, and merged them with the F&M and Sandy River as the Sandy River and Rangeley Lakes Railroad in 1908 (see there for subsequent history). The Eustis Railroad was leased until it joined the merger in 1911.

== Locomotives ==
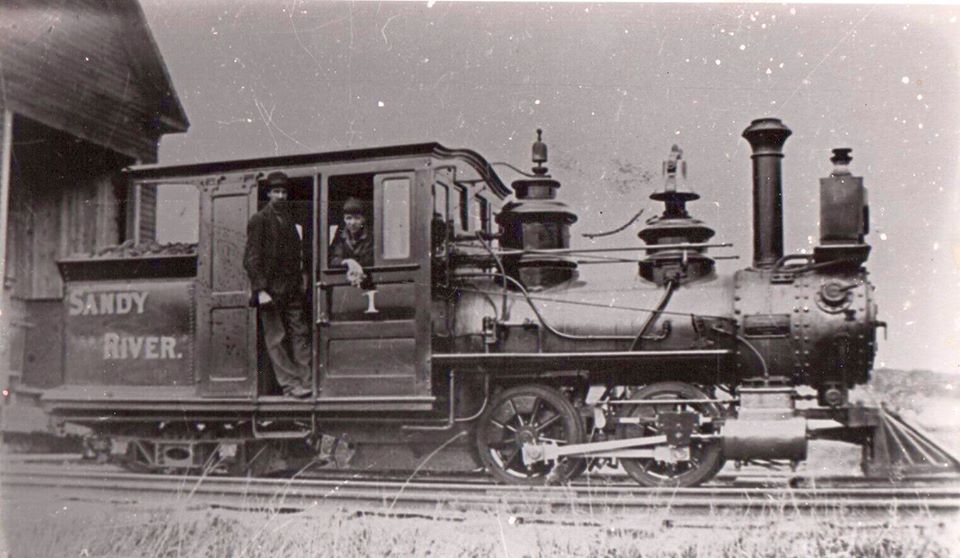
Forney locomotive No.1 at Phillips, Maine

Number	Name	Builder	Type	Date	Works number	Notes
1	Dawn	Hinkley Locomotive Works	0-4-4RT Forney locomotive	1877	1251	Formerly locomotive Ariel of the Billerica and Bedford Railroad. Scrapped in 1912.
2	Echo	Hinkley Locomotive Works	0-4-4RT Forney locomotive	1877	1261	Formerly locomotive Puck of the Billerica and Bedford Railroad. Sold to the Phillips and Rangeley Railroad; scrapped in 1912.
3		H. K. Porter, Inc	0-4-4RT Forney locomotive	1883	565	Sold to Wiscasset & Quebec RR, later scrapped in 1916
4		Portland Company	0-4-4RT Forney locomotive	1890	616	Became Sandy River and Rangeley Lakes Railroad #5
5	N.B.Beal	Portland Company	0-4-4RT Forney locomotive	1891	622	Became Sandy River and Rangeley Lakes Railroad #6, preserved as WW&F #9
6		Baldwin Locomotive Works	2-6-0 tender	1893	13733	Built as 2nd #2. Renumbered #6 in June 1905. Became Sandy River and Rangeley Lakes Railroad No. 18
7		Baldwin Locomotive Works	2-6-0 tender	1892	12964	ex-Laurel River and Hot Springs Railroad; purchased in 1900 as 2nd #3. Renumbered #7 in June 1905. Became Sandy River and Rangeley Lakes Railroad No. 16
8		Baldwin Locomotive Works	2-6-2 tender	1904	23874	Became Sandy River and Rangeley Lakes Railroad #19
