= Portland Company =

Rolling stock manufacturer

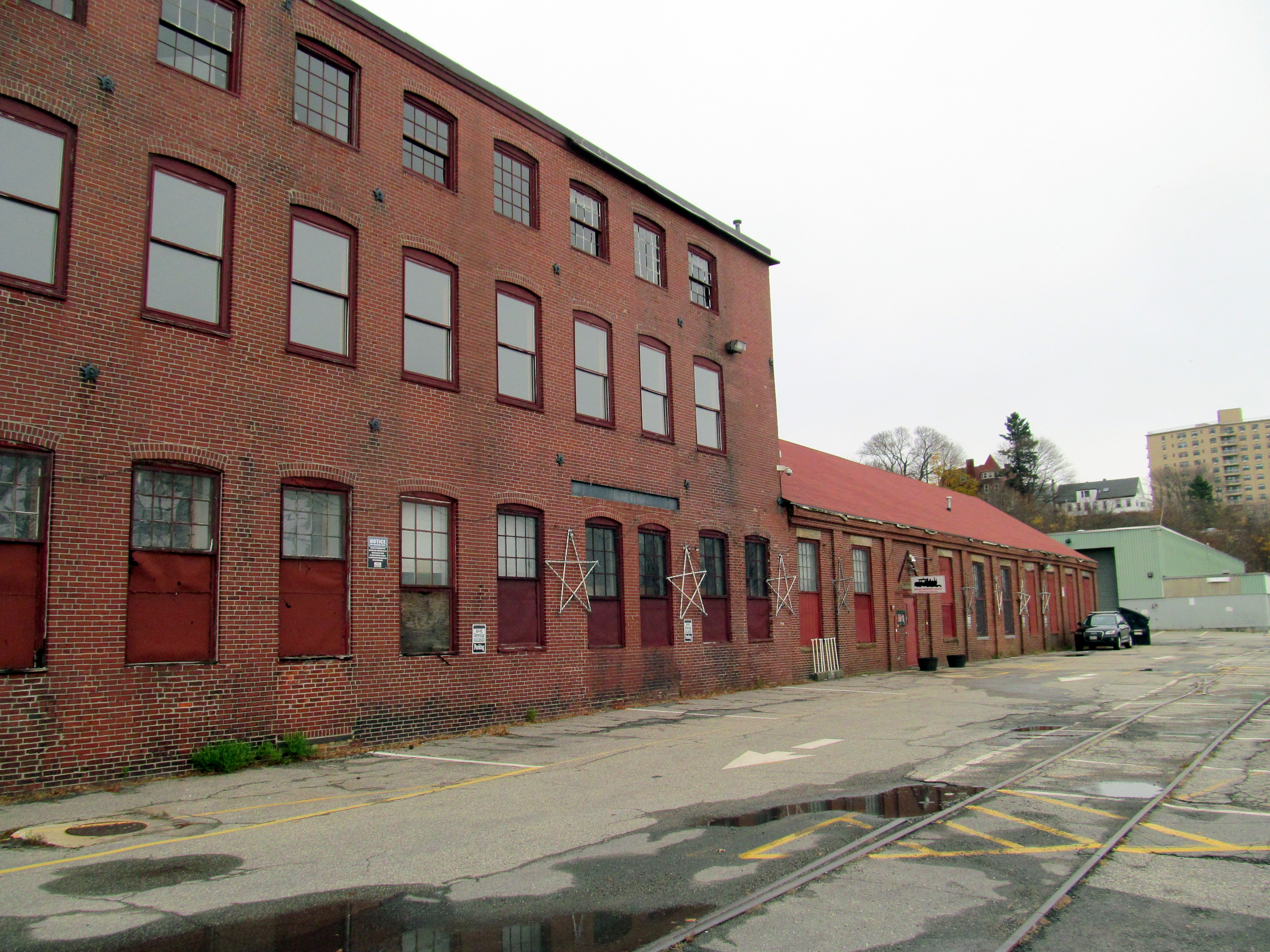
- Portland Company Building #6 in November, 2016
- Industry: Railroad equipment
- Founded: November 10, 1846 (178 years ago)
- Founder: John A. Poor; Septimus Norris
- Defunct: 1978
- Headquarters: New England, United States

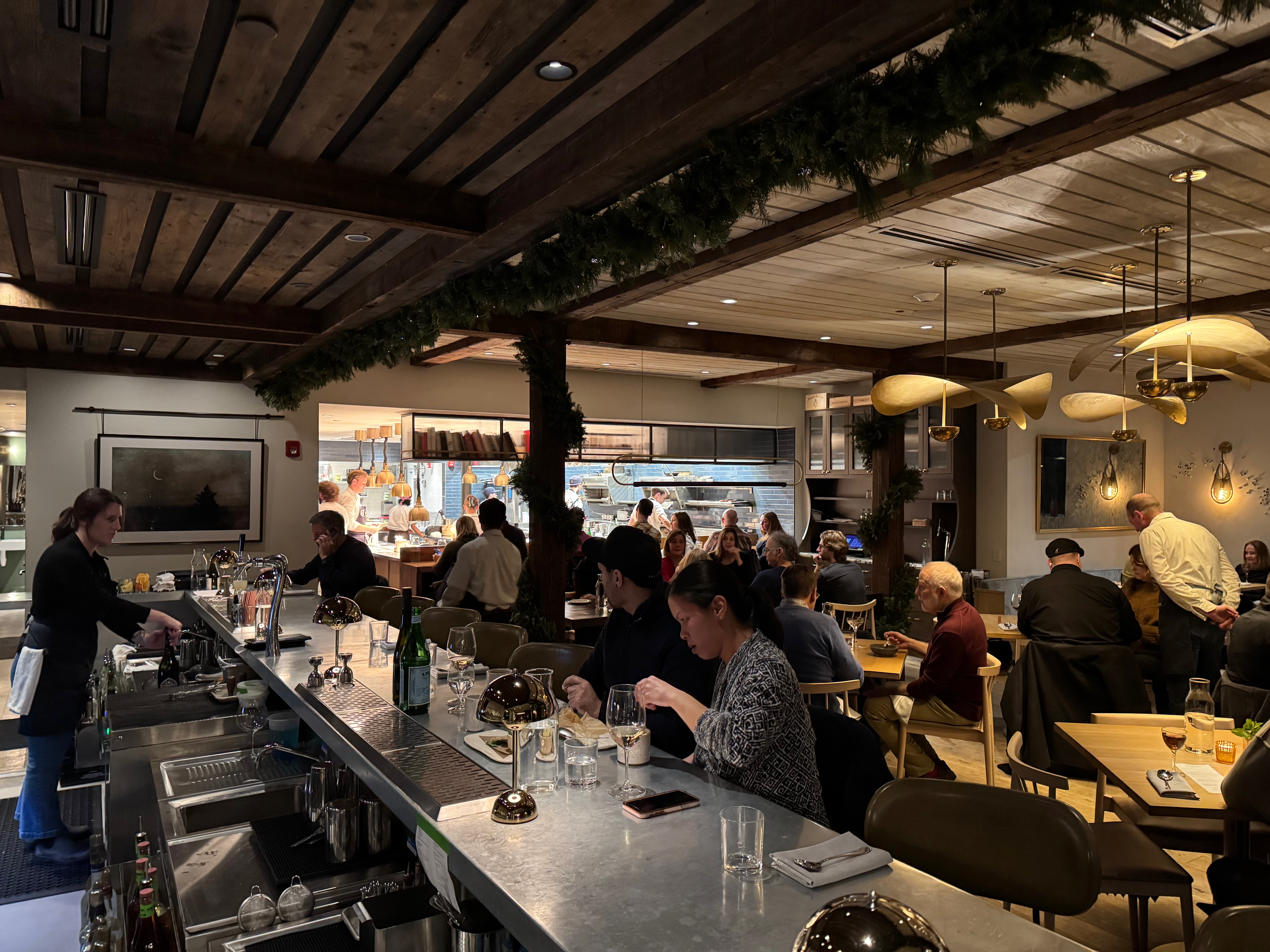
Part of one of the buildings' interiors in 2024, when it was the home of Twelve restaurant

The Portland Company was established 10 November 1846 by John A. Poor and Norris Locomotive Works engineer Septimus Norris as a locomotive foundry to build railroad equipment for the adjacent Portland terminus of the Atlantic and St. Lawrence Railroad connection between Portland, Maine, and Montreal. The shops opened for business in October, 1847. Its first locomotive, the Augusta, emerged from the shops in July 1848 for delivery to the Portland, Saco & Portsmouth (later part of the Boston and Maine Railroad). Over the next several decades, the company produced in its Fore Street facilities over 600 steam locomotives as well as 160 merchant and naval vessels, railcars, construction equipment, Knox automobiles, and the like. Portland Company built the engines of the civil war side-wheel gunboats Agawam and Pontoosuc. Taking into account its other products, the company could lay claim to being one of the leading medium-to-heavy steel manufacturers in New England. The company ceased production in 1978.

Presently, according to The Portland Company Complex website, the site has become marine-oriented, with a small marina, several marine and other office tenants and the Maine Narrow Gauge Railroad Co. & Museum.

The Portland Company building is the only intact 19th-century industrial structure on the Portland waterfront, and an area which has become known as Portland Foreside. In February 2016, Portland City Council voted to approve the creation of a historic district which would permit a developer to demolish the former erecting shop in the complex but preserve seven other buildings during the creation of a public plaza. Six months later, the developer asked to move the main building, built in 1895 and formerly known as the Pattern Storehouse, 230 feet (70 m) in order to add a road, parking garage and mixed-use buildings in the complex.

As of 2024, one of the buildings is the home of the restaurant Twelve.

== 5 ft 6 in (1,676 mm)-gauge locomotives for the Atlantic and St. Lawrence Railroad ==
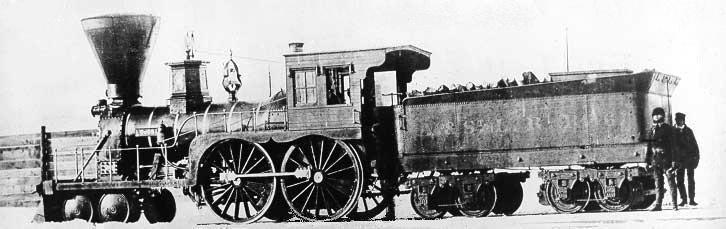
Coos was the 14th locomotive built by Portland Company

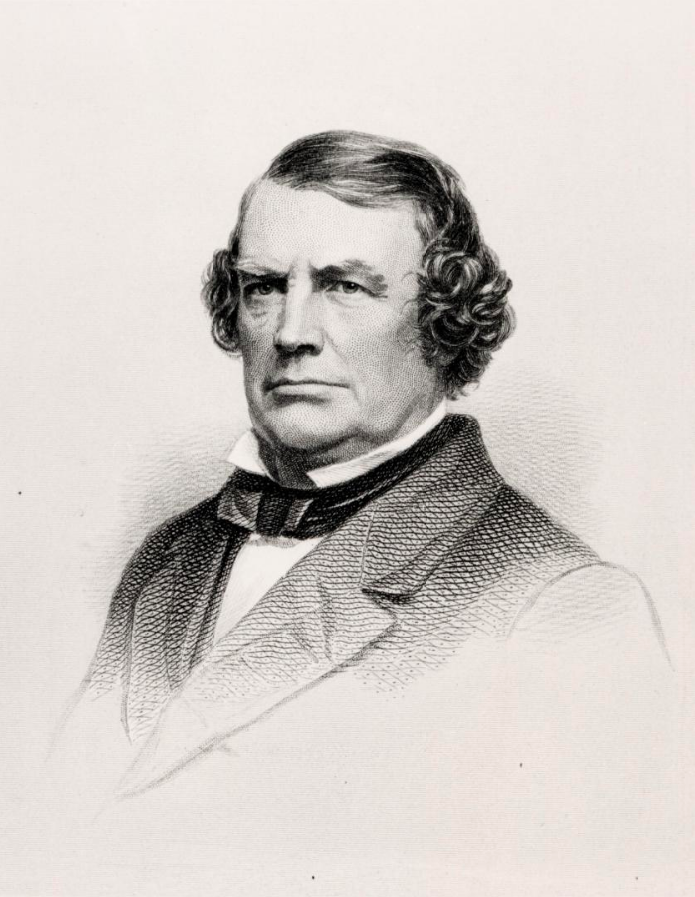
Founder John A. Poor

Works number	Date	Type	Weight	Drivers	Cylinders	A&StL#	Name	GTR #
2	September 1848	4-4-0	23 tons	60"	15x22	1	Montreal	101
5	30 December 1848	4-4-0	23 tons	60"	15x22	2	Machigonne	102
6	24 February 1849	4-4-0	22 tons	60"	15x22	3	(1st) Oxford	103
8	16 May 1849	4-4-0	24 tons	60"	14x20	4	William P. Preble	104
13	30 December 1949	4-4-0	22 tons	66"	15x20	5	Waterville	105
14	1 February 1850	4-4-0	22 tons	66"	15x20	6	Coos	106
18	1850	4-4-0	25 tons	60"	15x20	26	Jenny Lind	
19	January 1851	4-4-0	22 tons	60"	15x20	7	Felton	107
20	June 1851	4-4-0	24 tons	54"	17x22	8	Railway King	108
28	December 1851	4-4-0	22 tons	60"	14x20	9	Casco	109
29	January 1852	4-4-0	22 tons	66"	15x20	10	Forest City	110
30	March 1852	4-4-0	20 tons	60"	13x20	11	Danville	111
31	1852	4-4-0	23 tons	60"	13x20	27	Consuelo	
32	May 1852	4-4-0	22 tons	60"	14x22	12	Falmouth	112
36	11 November 1852	4-4-0	22 tons	60"	15x20	13	Daniel Webster	113
40	January 1853	4-4-0	24 tons	60"	16x22	14	Cumberland	114
41	April 1853	4-4-0	24 tons	60"	16x22	17	Norway	117
42	27 January 1853	4-4-0	21 tons	66"	14x22	15	Nulhegan	115
43	11 April 1853	4-4-0	23 tons	72"	15x22	16	Paris	116
44	24 June 1853	4-4-0	23 tons	66"	15x22	20	Gloucester	120
45	23 May 1853	4-4-0	24 tons	60"	15x22	18	Yarmouth	118
46	June 1853	4-4-0	24 tons	60"	15x22	19	Amonoosuc	119
48	20 September 1853	4-4-0	24 tons	60"	16x22	21	Vermont	121
49	16 November 1853	4-4-0	22 tons	72"	14x22	22	Gorham	122
56	1 December 1853	4-4-0	23 tons	72"	15x22	23	J.S.Little	123

== Two-foot gauge locomotives ==
In 1890, the Portland Company acquired patterns used by the Hinkley Locomotive Works for its two-foot gauge locomotives. Portland improved the pattern into the most successful design on Maine's two-foot gauge railroads. The Portland design retained ornate Victorian features including capped domes and a cab roof with reversing curvature. The first of the design was the heaviest and most powerful locomotive on any of the Maine two-foot gauge railroads at the time of delivery. Portland locomotives became the standard for passenger service as larger freight engines were built. Portland locomotives were subsequently used for yard service and on lines with lighter rail. The Portland Company was the dominant manufacturer of freight cars for the Maine two-foot gauge railroads between 1890 and 1907.

The final two-foot gauge locomotive built by The Portland Company was a less successful enlargement of the original design. Vulcan Iron Works built two modernized versions of Portland's basic design for the Monson Railroad in 1913 and 1918 after Portland Company ceased manufacture of railway locomotives. The basic Portland design pulled the last Kennebec Central Railroad train in 1929, the last Wiscasset, Waterville, and Farmington Railway train in 1933, and the last Monson Railroad train in 1943.

Works number	Date	Type	Weight	Railroad	Number	Notes
615	7 October 1890	0-4-4 Forney locomotive	18 tons	Phillips and Rangeley Railroad	1	became Sandy River and Rangeley Lakes Railroad #7
616	22 October 1890	0-4-4 Forney locomotive	18 tons	Sandy River Railroad	4	became Sandy River and Rangeley Lakes Railroad #5
621	December 1890	0-4-4 Forney locomotive		Kennebec Central Railroad	2	
622	2 May 1891	0-4-4 Forney locomotive	18 tons	Sandy River Railroad	5	became Sandy River and Rangeley Lakes Railroad #6 then Kennebec Central Railroad #4 then Wiscasset, Waterville and Farmington Railway #9, preserved in operational condition at WW&F Railway Museum
624	14 April 1892	0-4-4 Forney locomotive	19 tons	Bridgton and Saco River Railroad	3	became Kennebec Central Railroad #3 then Wiscasset, Waterville and Farmington Railway #8
626	November 1894	0-4-4 Forney locomotive	19 tons	Wiscasset and Quebec Railroad	2	
627	November 1894	0-4-4 Forney locomotive	19 tons	Wiscasset and Quebec Railroad	3	
628	November 1906	2-4-4 Forney locomotive	27 tons	Bridgton and Saco River Railroad	5	

== Preserved Portland locomotives ==
The following locomotives built by Portland have been preserved.

Serial number	Wheel arrangement (Whyte notation)	Build date	Operational owner(s)	Disposition
233	4-4-0	1872	Grand Trunk Railway number 40	On display at the Canada Science and Technology Museum
622	0-4-4T Forney locomotive	2 May 1891	Sandy River Railroad number 5 Sandy River and Rangeley Lakes Railroad number 6 Kennebec Central Railroad number 4 Wiscasset, Waterville and Farmington Railway number 9	Operational at the Wiscasset, Waterville and Farmington Railway

== Archives and records ==
- Portland Company records at Baker Library Special Collections, Harvard Business School.
