= Hinkley Locomotive Works =

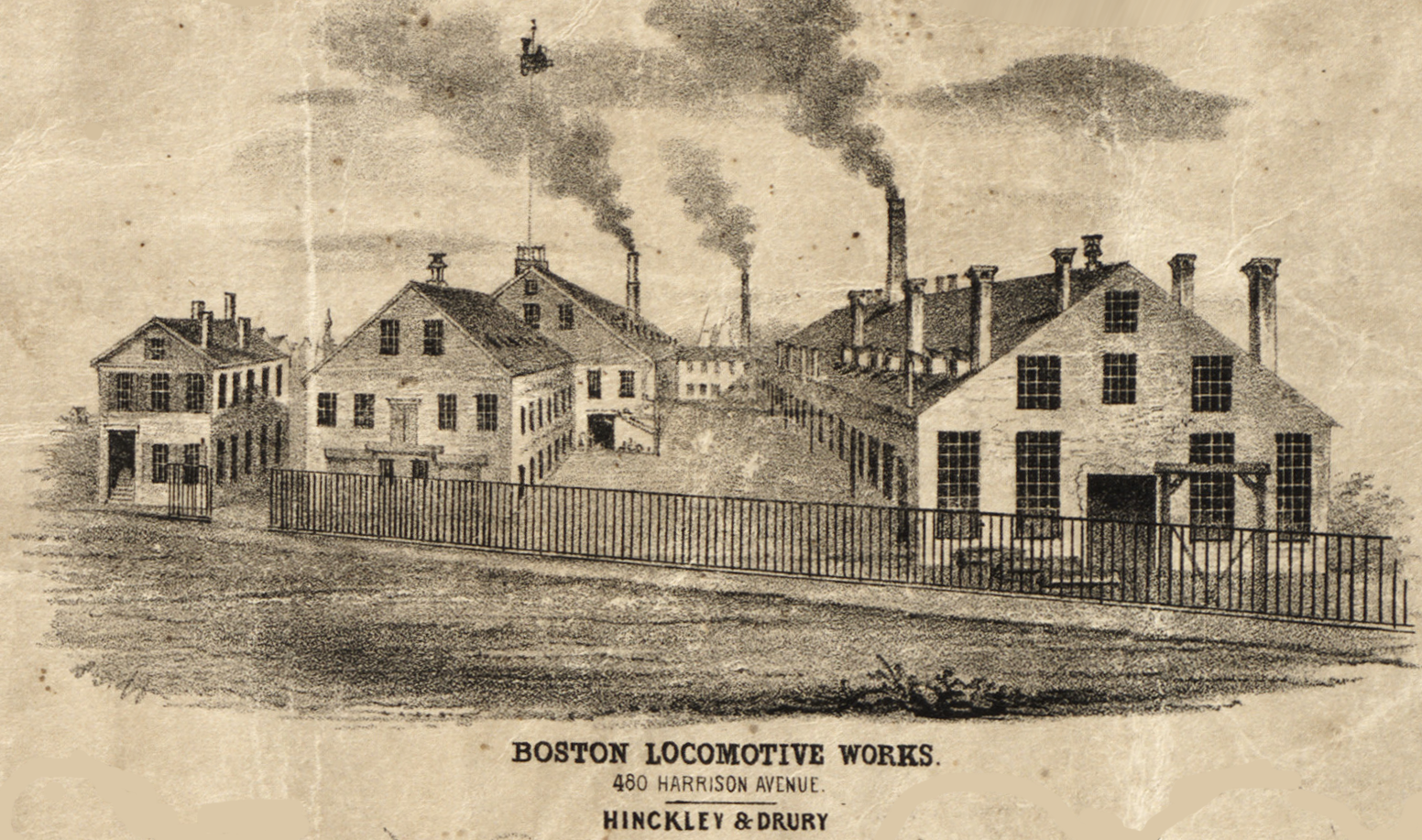
Boston Locomotive Works in 1852

Hinkley Locomotive Works was a steam locomotive manufacturer based in Boston, Massachusetts in the 19th century.

== History ==
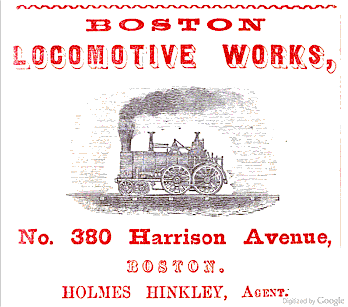
An 1853 advertisement for Boston Locomotive Works

The company that was to become known as Hinkley Locomotive Works got its start in Boston in 1831. Holmes Hinkley and his partner Daniel F. Child founded the Boston Machine Works and soon built the third stationary steam engine that was constructed in Massachusetts. The company's first locomotive was a 4-2-0 built in 1840 that followed the roughly standard designs of the 1830s. Hinkley's early locomotives closely resembled those designed by John Souther.

The company gained a reputation as a reliable and respectable locomotive builder and grew to become the largest manufacturer in New England within a decade. In 1848 the company reorganized as the Boston Locomotive Works and operated under that name until foreclosure due to the financial panic in 1859.

After reorganization under Jarvis Williams, the company became Hinkley, Williams and Company. Hinkley, who had been forced out in the foreclosure, returned to the company in another reorganization in 1864 as the Hinkley and Williams Locomotive Works. The company produced locomotives for the railroads of the American Civil War and regained some of the earlier profitability that they had enjoyed earlier in the century. Also during the Civil War, as Hinckley, Williams and Co, fifty large cannon were forged for the US Government.

In 1872 the company was renamed Hinkley Locomotive Works but fell into bankruptcy again by the end of the decade. This bankruptcy led to the 1880 reorganization as the Hinkley Locomotive Company. Orders fell off and the company was permanently closed in 1889. In 1890, the Portland Company acquired the patterns used by the Hinkley Locomotive Works for its two-foot gauge locomotives.

== Locomotives ==
A 9-ton 0-4-0 built in 1846 as the Lion for the Machiasport Railroad of eastern Maine is preserved at the Maine State Museum in Augusta, Maine.

Another Hinkley engine still exists but not in its original form. In 1879, the Hinkley Locomotive Works built a 4-4-0 named "H. C. Hardon", and numbered 73, for the Atchison, Topeka and Santa Fe. This engine was converted to a 2-8-0 and re-numbered 643, by the Santa Fe shops in 1897 and it served the Santa Fe until its retirement c1953. This engine, not currently in operating condition, is now located in the Oklahoma Railway Museum in Oklahoma City, Oklahoma. It is unlikely to run again.

A Hinkley locomotive was used to transport Abraham Lincoln from Springfield, Illinois, to Washington D.C. for his inauguration.
