= Forney locomotive =

Type of tank locomotive

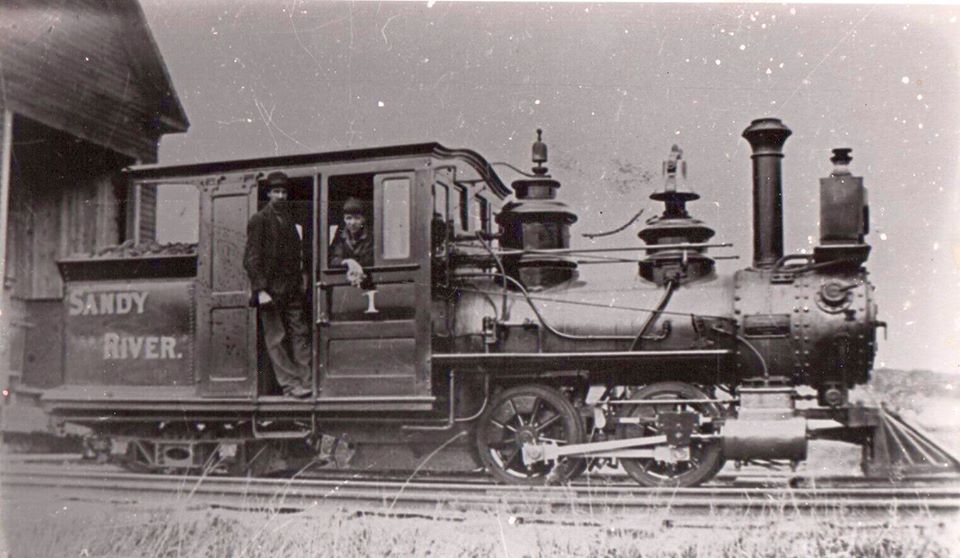
Sandy River Railroad Forney locomotive 1

The Forney locomotive is a type of tank locomotive patented by Matthias N. Forney between 1861 and 1864 and used predominantly in the US.

== Forney design ==
Forney locomotives include the following characteristics:

- An 0-4-4RT wheel arrangement, that is four driving wheels followed by a truck with four wheels (though the term has become somewhat generic; many small tank engines of various wheel arrangements have been called Forneys).
- No flange on the second pair of driving wheels.
- The fuel bunker and water tank placed over the four-wheel truck.

== History ==
The locomotives were set up to run cab (or bunker) first, effectively as a 4-4-0 (or 6-4-0), though the type achieved popularity for its ability to operate well in either direction. The 4-4-0 wheel arrangement, with its three-point suspension, was noted for its good tracking ability, while the flangeless middle wheels allowed the locomotive to round tight curves. Placing the fuel and water over the truck rather than the driving wheels meant the locos had a constant adhesive weight, something other forms of tank locomotive did not.

Large numbers of Forney locos were built for the surface and elevated commuter railroads that were built in cities such as New York, Chicago and Boston. These railroads required a small, fast locomotive that tracked well and could deal with tight curves. Their short runs meant the limited fuel and water capacity was not a problem, making the Forney ideal. However, their noise, smoke and tendency to drop ash and cinders (particularly from overhead tracks) made them unpopular. As these railroads began to electrify or were replaced by subways at the end of the 19th century, Forneys began to disappear.

Forneys were also popular on the 2 ft (610 mm) narrow gauge railroads of Maine. The use of these locomotives differed in that they were run smokestack leading, like a conventional locomotive, and all driving wheels were flanged. The latter resulted in Maine narrow gauge railroads having comparatively broad radius curves. Further developments included the introduction of locomotives with a leading pony truck, giving a 2-4-4 wheel arrangement. This was done to improve tracking ability in these locomotives.

== Related designs ==
The 0-4-4RT type was a precursor of other designs which may have drawn on the Forney, such as the Boston & Albany and Central of New Jersey 4-6-4T.

The Mason Locomotive Works, developed the Mason Bogie locomotive, a type of British Single Fairlie. Unlike the Forneys, the Mason Bogies were articulated locomotives: the boiler and fuel/water tank were on the main frame and the engine was on a separate steam "bogie" that was articulated to pivot beneath the boiler. Because the bogie was articulated, the reach rod and reversing lever were positioned above the main frame earning the locomotives the nickname "sewing machines."

== Surviving locomotives ==
Today, Forney locomotives can still be seen on the Maine Narrow Gauge Railroad Museum, the Hoosier Valley Railroad Museum, and the Forney Transportation Museum. The No. 3 and No. 5 locomotives on the Disneyland Railroad were originally built as Forneys, but are now 2-4-4RT Boston-type locomotives.
