= St. Patrick's Catholic Church (Newcastle, Maine) =

Historic church in Maine, United States

- U.S. National Register of Historic Places
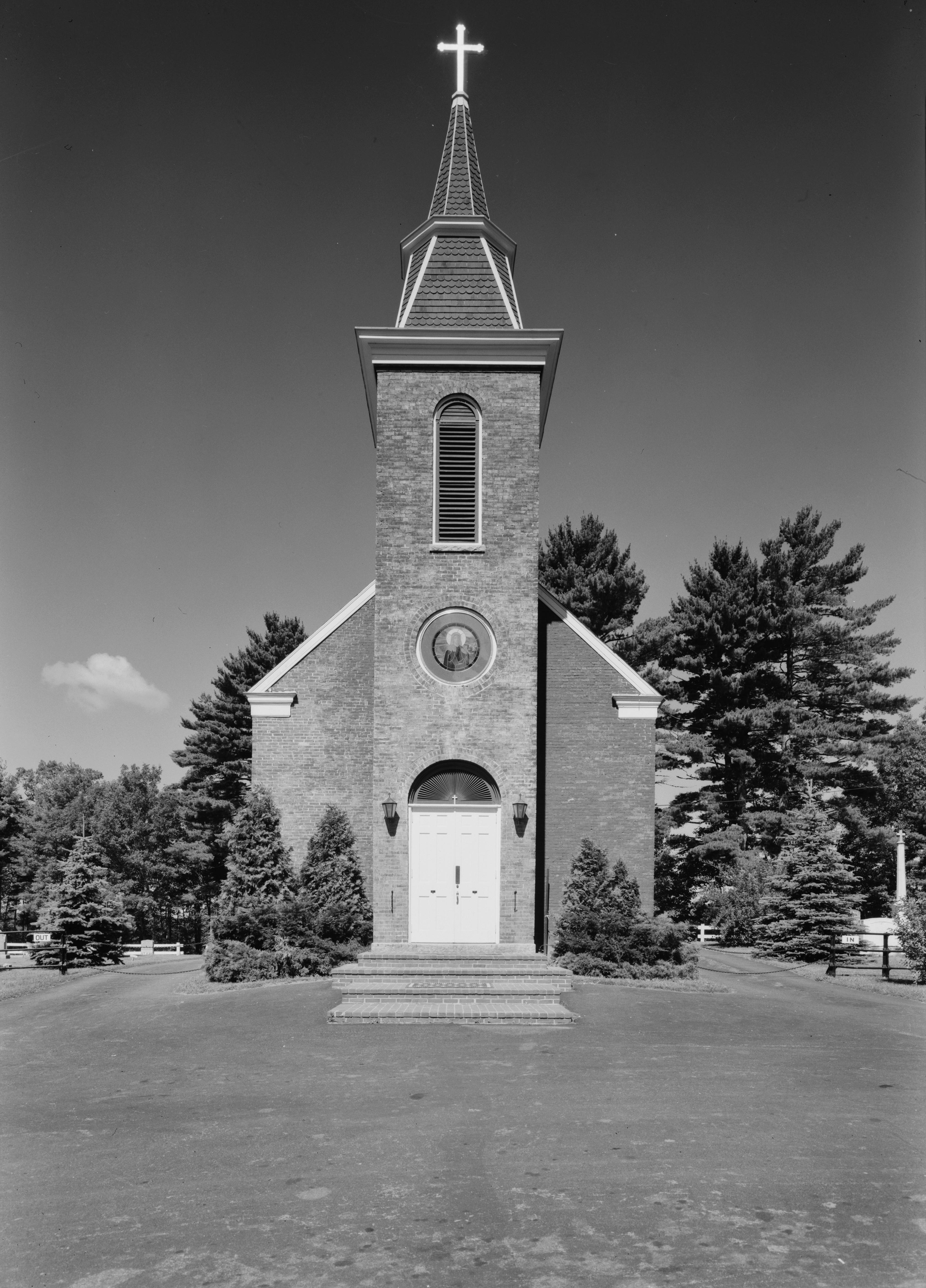
- HABS photo, 1960

- Location within Maine Location within the United States
- Location: 380 Academy Rd., Newcastle, Maine
- Coordinates: 44°3′25″N 69°32′7″W
- Area: 5 acres (2.0 ha)
- Built: 1807
- Architect: Codd, Nicholas
- Architectural style: Colonial, Federal
- NRHP reference No.: 73000133
- Added to NRHP: April 23, 1973

St. Patrick's Catholic Church is a historic church at 380 Academy Hill Road in Newcastle, Maine. Built in 1807, it is the oldest surviving Roman Catholic church building in New England, and was listed on the National Register of Historic Places in 1973. It remains in use as a community within the Parish of All Saints in the Diocese of Portland.

== Description and history ==
St. Patrick's Catholic Church stands in a rural setting a short way south of the village of Damariscotta Mills, on the west side of Academy Hill Road just south of its junction with Maine State Route 215. It is a rectangular brick building, bearing some stylistic resemblance to churches of the period in Virginia. It has a gabled roof, and a projecting square tower with the main entrance at its base, set in a segmented-arch opening. The next stage of the tower has a round window, with a belfry at the next stage that has round-arch louvered openings. A projecting cornice separates the belfry from the two-stage steeple, which is topped by a cross. Historic photos of the church show it with a hipped roof over the belfry instead of a steeple. The interior of the church retains original fixtures, including floors, pews, and altar.

The church was built in 1807 and consecrated in 1808. Its construction was made possible by the efforts of two prominent local businessmen, both Irish immigrants. The parish was organized in 1796 by James Kavanagh and Matthew Cottrill, and first met without a priest in a wood-frame chapel. Kavanagh and Cottrill paid for construction of this edifice, which is built with brick made across the Damariscotta River and hauled across the frozen river in winter. Lime for its mortar was imported from Ireland. The church's design is attributed to Nicholas Codd, who also built the Gov. Edward Kavanaugh House in Damariscotta Mills and the Matthew Cottrill House in Damariscotta. It is the oldest surviving Roman Catholic church in New England. Among the historical artifacts in the church are a bell cast by Paul Revere & Sons and the original altar that Jean-Louis Lefebvre de Cheverus used to consecrate the building.

On July 1, 2009, the parish of St. Patrick was merged with five others to form All Saints Parish, as part of a reorganization plan promulgated in 2005.

In 2013, the parish history group discovered that the building needed restoration. Parishioners and local donors raised approximately $320,000 to fix the roof, masonry, and windows. The project was completed in 2022.

== See also ==
- National Register of Historic Places listings in Lincoln County, Maine
