= Main Street Historic District (Damariscotta, Maine) =

Historic district in Maine, United States

- U.S. National Register of Historic Places
- U.S. Historic district
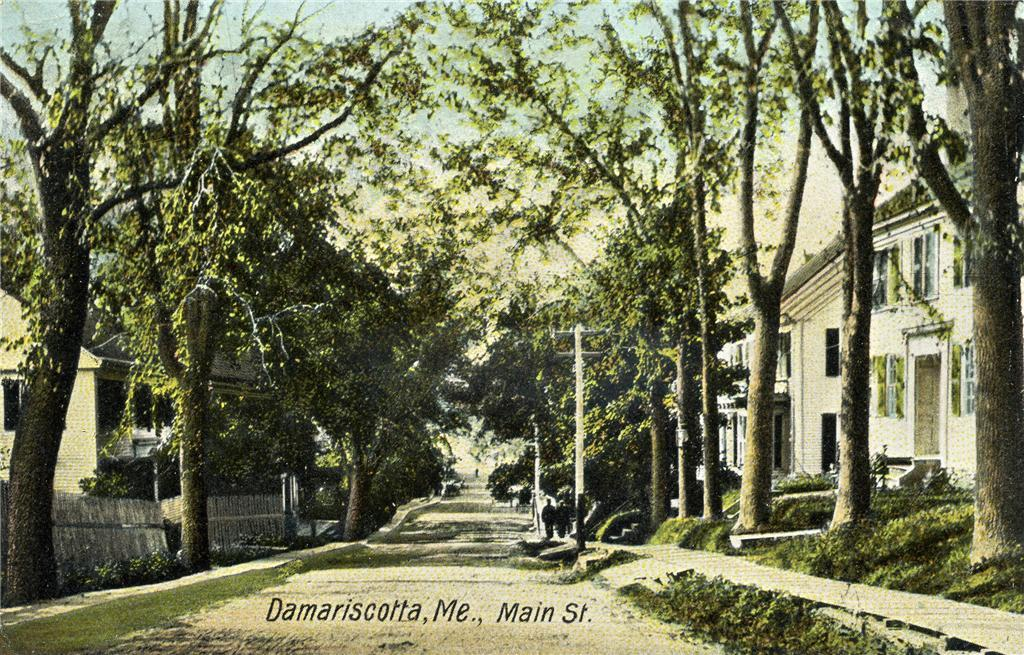

- Location within Maine Location within the United States
- Location: Main Street, Damariscotta, Maine
- Coordinates: 44°1′58″N 69°31′56″W
- Area: 5 acres (2.0 ha)
- Architectural style: Late 19th And 20th Century Revivals, Greek Revival, Federal-Italianate
- NRHP reference No.: 79000154 (original); 00001636 (increase)

Significant dates
- Added to NRHP: August 10, 1979
- Boundary increase: January 22, 2001

The Main Street Historic District encompasses the historic commercial center of Damariscotta, Maine. Although the community was settled in the 18th century, most of its downtown area dates to the second half of the 19th century due to an 1845 fire. Lining Main Street east of the Damariscotta River, the downtown has a well-preserved collection of commercial, residential, and civic structures from the period. The district was added to the National Register of Historic Places in 1979, and enlarged in 2001.

== Description and history ==
The town of Damariscotta, located in the Mid Coast part of Maine, is located at the head of navigation of the Damariscotta River. This area has a colonial history dating to 1625, when land including the town was purchased from Native Americans by John Brown. The town was first settled in 1754, and was incorporated in 1847 from parts of Bristol and Nobleboro. The town was by then a significant shipbuilding center. Its downtown was largely destroyed by a fire in 1845, after which it was rebuilt in brick and wood. Many of its buildings date from this period or later in the 19th century.

Damariscotta's downtown is located on a neck of land that projects into the broad Damariscotta River, where Main Street (United States Route 1, the area's main thoroughfare has bypassed the downtown, and Main Street now is designated as United States Route 1B) crosses to the downtown area of Newcastle on the west side. Commercial buildings line the southern side of Main Street as far as Water Street, while the north side is lined by a combination of commercial and residential properties up to Church Street. Many of the residences on the western portion of the north side have been adapted for commercial use. These notably include two particularly fine houses, the Matthew Cottrill House and the Stephen Coffin House, were built by leading shipbuilders and merchants in the early 19th century and survived the 1845 fire. At the eastern end of the district is the 1754 Chapman-Hall House, one of the oldest in the town, and the 1840s Greek Revival Damariscotta Baptist Church.

== See also ==
- National Register of Historic Places listings in Lincoln County, Maine
- Downtown Damariscotta Visitor Information
