= Damariscotta Shell Midden Historic District =

Historic district in Maine, United States

- U.S. National Register of Historic Places
- U.S. Historic district
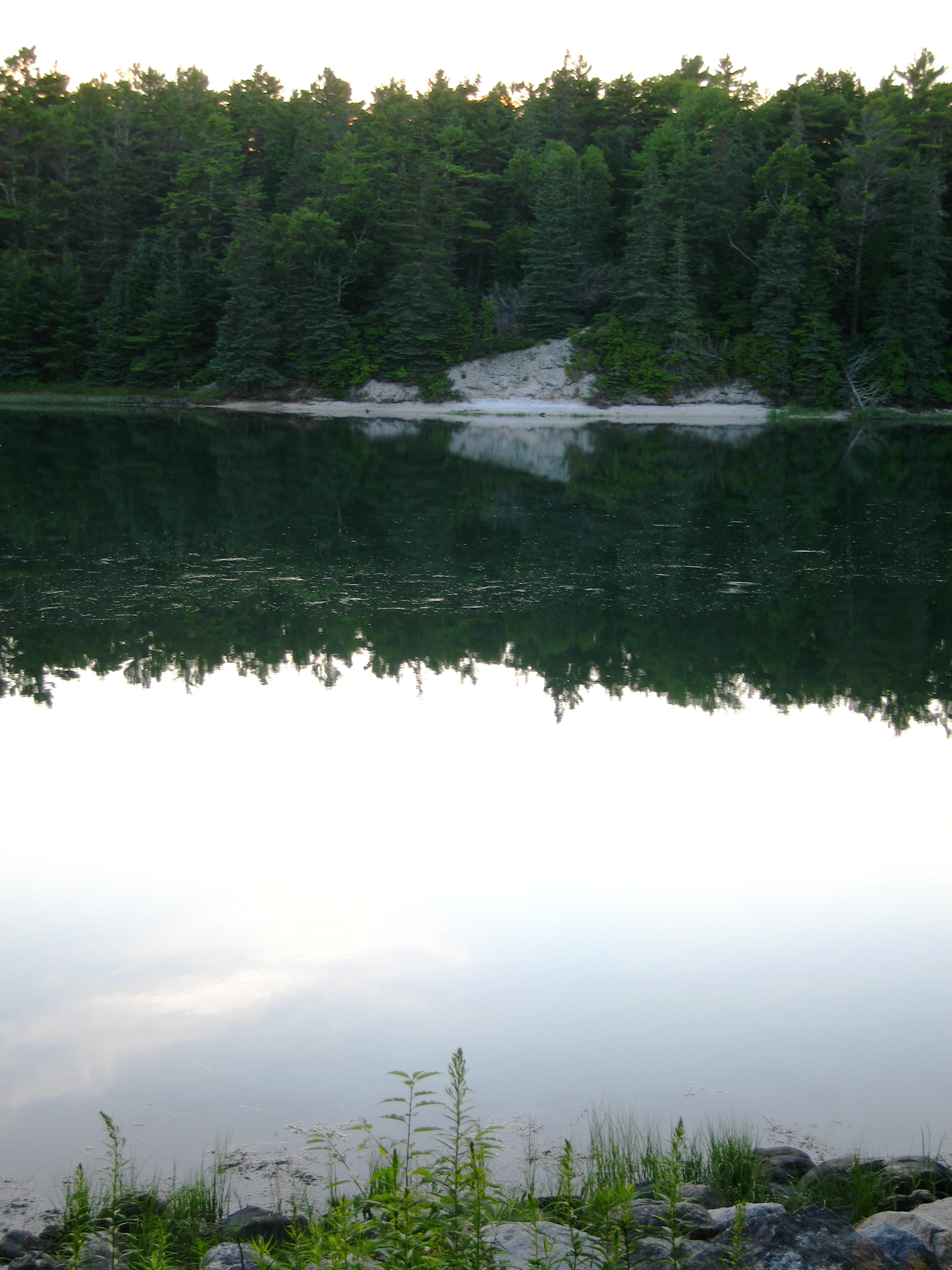
- View of the Glidden Shell Midden

- Location within Maine Location within the United States
- Nearest city: Damariscotta, Maine
- Area: 309 acres (125 ha)
- NRHP reference No.: 98001238
- Added to NRHP: October 8, 1998

The Damariscotta Shell Midden Historic District encompasses a significant collection of shell middens along the Damariscotta River in Lincoln County, Maine. It includes eleven middens in all, including the well-known Whaleback Shell Midden and the Glidden Midden, which is the largest shell midden in the northeastern United States. The area has the largest concentration of such midden sites under conservation protection in the eastern United States. The district was listed on the National Register of Historic Places in 1998.

== Description ==
The Damariscotta River is a tidal river that runs south through central Lincoln County, Maine. Its upper reaches (below Damariscotta Falls) are flanked by the towns of Newcastle on the west and Nobleboro and Damariscotta on the east. The river banks in this area remained largely undeveloped by European settlers (who first arrived in 1640) until the 19th century, when much land was cleared for agriculture. Since then, the land above the town centers of Damariscotta and Edgecomb (located on United States Route 1 on opposite sides of the river) has gradually become reforested.

Located on this stretch of river bank, now largely in the hands of the state or conservation organizations, are eleven shell middens. Two of these are famous: the Whaleback Shell Midden, now part of a state historic site, was the east coast's largest shell midden until it was commercially excavated for lime in the late 19th century. Opposite it stands the Glidden Midden, now the largest midden, which escaped that fate because its owner refused permission for commercial excavation. The Whaleback Midden commercial activity was observed by archaeologists, with samples, artifacts, and drawings of the midden cross-sections forming part of its historic record. It was again examined by the state in 1996.

Maine Survey Site 26.15 is also particularly noteworthy. It is located on a point of land, with deposits more than 1 metre (3.3 ft) deep. Archaeologists have recovered stone tools, bone fragments, ceramic artifacts, and fire-cracked rocks from within the midden matrix, evidence of human habitation and activity. Most of this midden consists of oyster shells, which were harvested in the winter and spring.

The other eight middens are all roughly dated, like the first three, to Maine's Middle Ceramic Period. Some of them are subjected to erosive forces due to their location on the banks of the river, while others have had their upper layers damaged by agricultural activity. The historic district includes one non-midden site, Maine Survey 26.47, which includes an Indian burial mound where at least one set of remains was found, as well as stone artifacts. All of these sites are owned by either the state or the Damariscotta River Association.

== See also ==
- National Register of Historic Places listings in Lincoln County, Maine
