= Col. Isaac G. Reed House =

Historic house in Maine, United States

- Formerly listed on the U.S. National Register of Historic Places
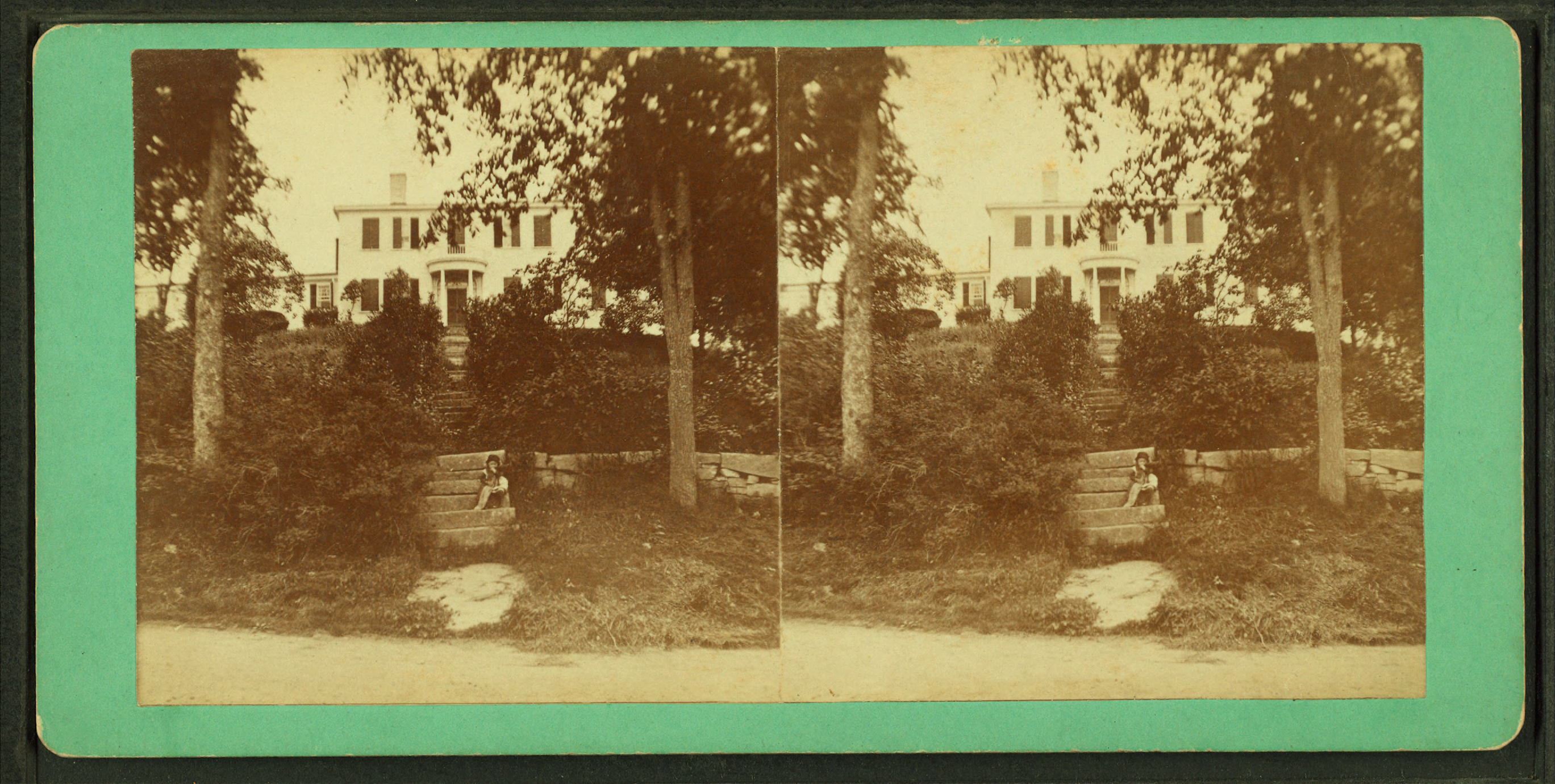
- An early stereoscopic view of the house

- Location within Maine Location within the United States
- Location: 60 Glidden St., Waldoboro, Maine
- Coordinates: 44°5′49″N 69°22′38″W
- Area: 0.8 acres (0.32 ha)
- Built: 1807
- Built by: Codd, Nicholas
- Architectural style: Federal
- NRHP reference No.: 05000796, updated to 100001676

Significant dates
- Added to NRHP: August 5, 2005
- Removed from NRHP: October 5, 2017

The Col. Isaac G. Reed House, also known historically as Cutting's Folly, was a historic house at 60 Glidden Street in Waldoboro, Maine. Built in 1807, it was a sophisticated local example of Federal period architecture, with an unusual period bow-shaped room. It was listed on the National Register of Historic Places in 2005. It was destroyed by fire on April 2, 2017, and was subsequently removed from the register.

== Description and history ==
The Reed House stood on the north side of Waldoboro's village center, on a property that extends between Glidden Street to the east and Jefferson Street to the west. The house was sited on a hill overlooking the Medomak River, from which it was separated by Jefferson Street and a series of grassy terraces, which have granite steps leading up to the house's front. It was a hip-roofed two-story wood-frame structure, set on a granite foundation and sheathed in wooden clapboards. A modern ell extended behind and left of the main block, and the half-round single-story Bow Room projected from its southern facade. The main entrance was framed by sidelight windows and pilasters, with a fanlight window above. This entrance assembly was sheltered by a half-round portico supported by Doric columns and topped by a low balustrade. Most of the windows were regular sash, but that above the entrance was topped by a half-round window, and had more elaborate trim. The interior retained original period woodwork and plaster finishes, as well as wide pine floors.

The house had an unusual construction history. Land for the house was purchased in 1807 by Rev. John Ruggles Cutting, who apparently began work on his house soon afterward. Cutting served as minister of the local Congregational church, and came under criticism from the congregation for the amount of time he spent working on the house (which acquired the name "Cutting's Folly" as a result), rather than tending to his duties. He was consequently dismissed in 1811, and was forced by a lack of funds to sell the unfinished building to Colonel Isaac Reed. Reed had the house finished, and in 1820 added the distinctive Bow Room.

Despite this change in ownership, the house showed no evidence of having had multiple builders. Its woodwork and finishes are attributed to Nicholas Cobb, one of the finest period builders in Maine's mid coast, whose other works include the Gov. Edward Kavanaugh House in Newcastle, and probably also include the Matthew Cottrill House, and elements of the Nickels-Sortwell House and Castle Tucker.

== See also ==
- National Register of Historic Places listings in Lincoln County, Maine
