= Samuel Melcher =

American architect

- Born: 1801
- Died: 1856 (aged 54–55)
- Occupation: Architect
- Buildings: North Yarmouth and Freeport Baptist Meetinghouse (1825 alteration)

Samuel Melcher (1801–1856) was an American architect active in the first half of the 19th century.

== Selected notable works ==
- North Yarmouth and Freeport Baptist Meetinghouse, Yarmouth, Maine (1825 alteration)
- Damariscotta Baptist Church, Damariscotta, Maine (1847)
