= Stephen Coffin House =

Historic house in Maine, United States

- U.S. National Register of Historic Places
- U.S. Historic district – Contributing property
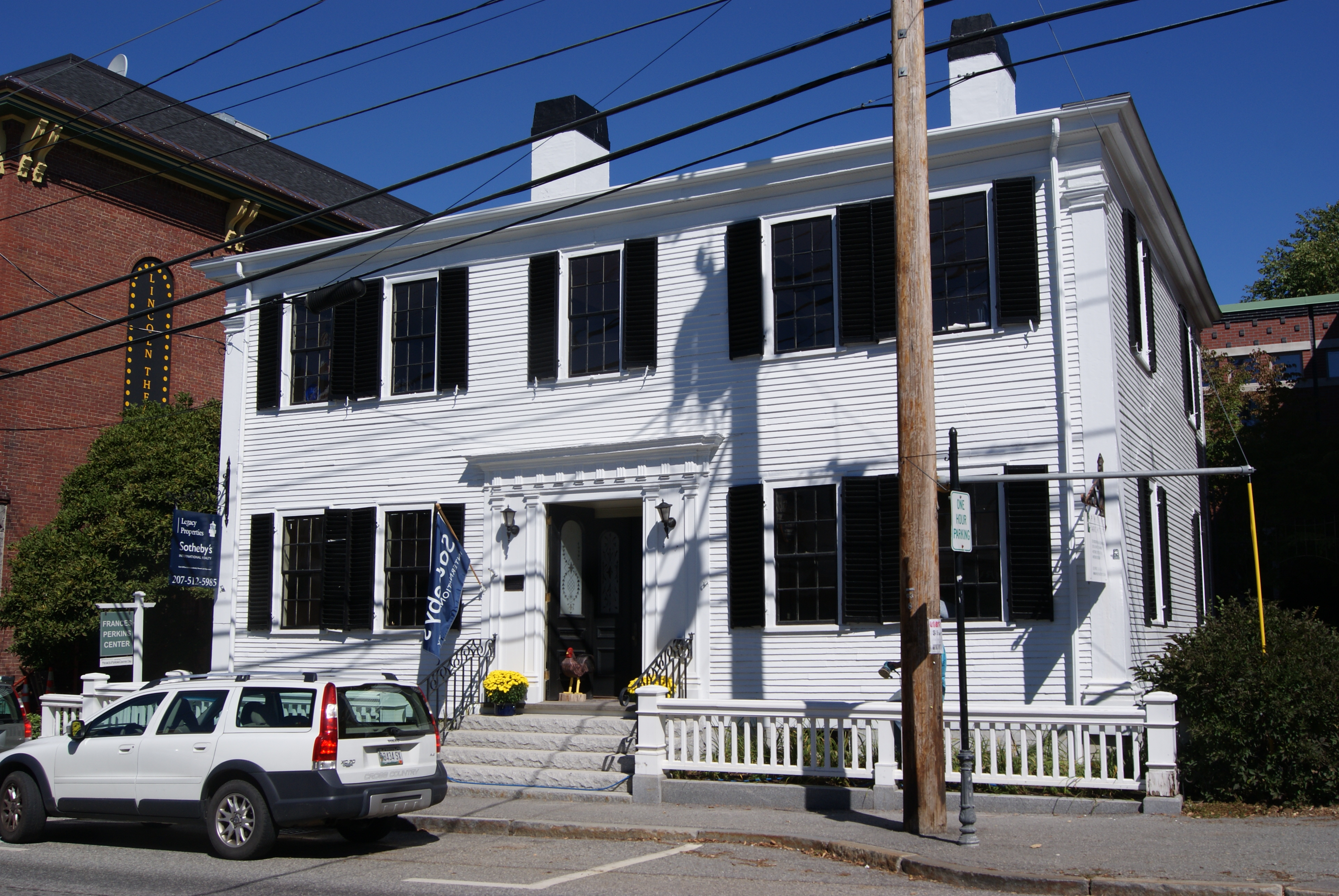

- Location within Maine Location within the United States
- Location: 170 Main St., Damariscotta, Maine
- Coordinates: 44°1′57″N 69°31′53″W
- Area: less than one acre
- Built: 1803
- Architectural style: Federal
- Part of: Main Street Historic District (2001 increase) (ID00001636)
- NRHP reference No.: 86003519

Significant dates
- Added to NRHP: April 15, 1987
- Designated CP: January 22, 2001

The Stephen Coffin House is a historic house at 170 Main Street in downtown Damariscotta, Maine. Built in the first decade of the 19th century, it is a fine local example of Federal style architecture, and is further distinctive for its ell, which is an early surviving example of an attached shop. The house served for many years as home to the Skidompha Public Library, and is now in commercial use. It was listed on the National Register of Historic Places in 1987.

== Description and history ==
The Stephen Coffin House stands on the north side of Damariscotta's Main Street downtown area, and is sandwiched between the Lincoln Theater to the west, and the modern facilities of the Skidompha Public Library to the east. It is a two-story wood-frame structure, with a hip roof and clapboard siding. Its front facade is five bays wide, with a central entrance set in a recess that is framed by paired pilasters and a corniced entablature. The building's front corners are pilastered. Granite steps lead to the entrance, and are flanked at the sidewalk by a low wooden fence. A period two-story ell extends from the western rear corner, and a modern ell extends from the eastern rear corner. The interior retains a number of original period features, but has also had significant alterations, although most of these have been sympathetic in character.

The house's exact construction date is shrouded in mystery, due to the number and type of land transactions Stephen Coffin engaged in between 1803 and 1807. It was almost certainly standing by 1807, and may have been built as early as 1803, its traditionally ascribed construction date. Coffin was a local merchant, and apparently operated his business out of the basement of this house. The western ell was probably built by Coffin when his business had outgrown the basement.

In 1922 the house was purchased by the Skidompha Library Association and the Damariscotta Women's Club, housing the library on the ground floor and the Women's Club facilities on the second. The building was enlarged by the eastern ell in the 1980s, and the library moved to its new facility next door in 2001. The building is now in commercial use.

== See also ==
- National Register of Historic Places listings in Lincoln County, Maine
