= Chapman-Hall House =

Historic house in Maine, United States

- U.S. National Register of Historic Places
- U.S. Historic district – Contributing property
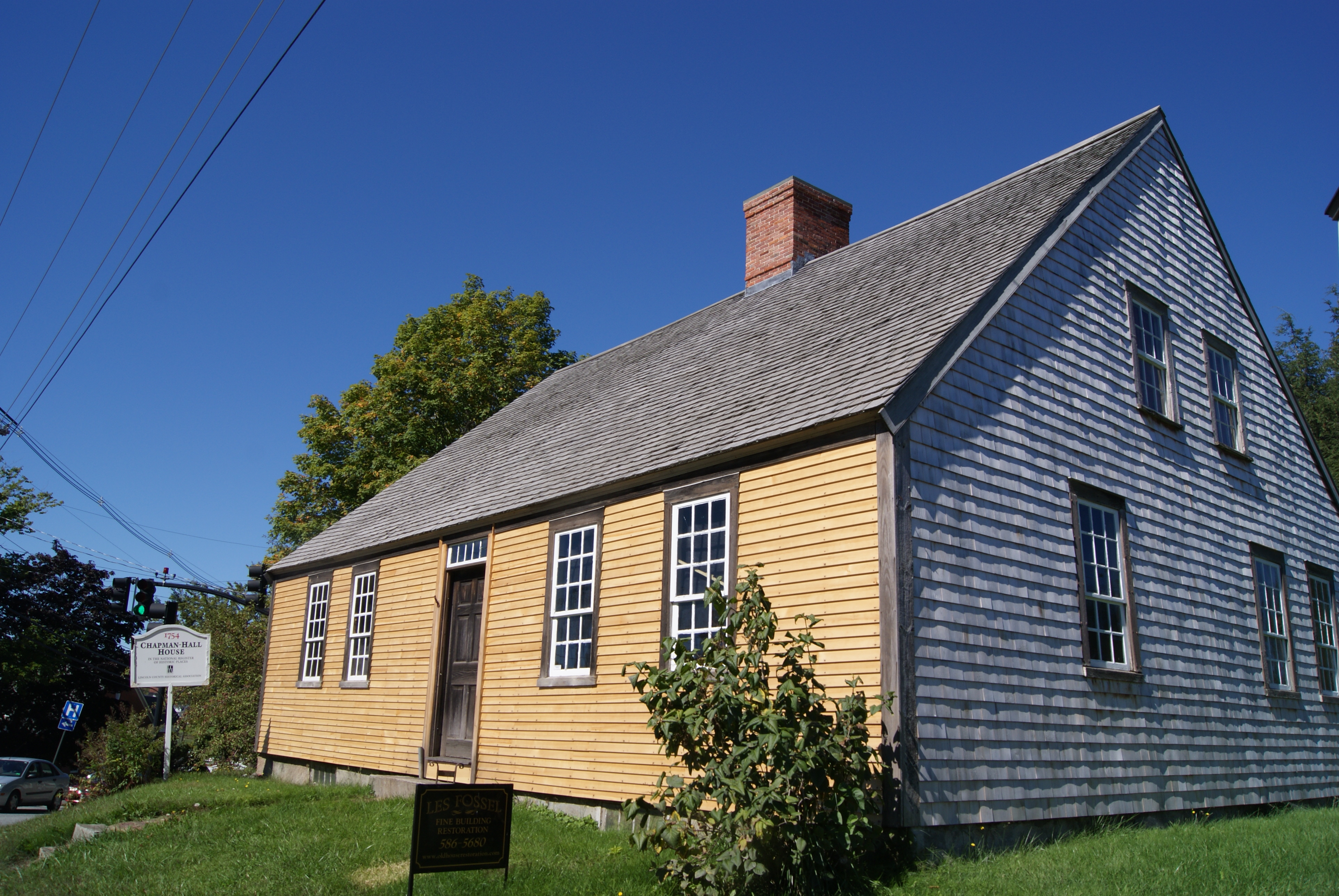

- Location within Maine Location within the United States
- Location: 270 Main St. (corner of Vine St.), Damariscotta, Maine
- Coordinates: 44°1′57″N 69°31′47″W
- Area: 0.3 acres (0.12 ha)
- Built: 1754
- Built by: Nathaniel Chapman
- Part of: Main Street Historic District (2001 increase) (ID00001636)
- NRHP reference No.: 70000077

Significant dates
- Added to NRHP: May 19, 1970
- Designated CP: January 22, 2001

The Chapman-Hall House is a historic house museum at 270 Main Street in Damariscotta, Maine. Built in 1754 by one of the area's first permanent white settlers, it is the oldest standing house in the town, and one of the oldest in the state. It was listed on the National Register of Historic Places in 1970.

== Description and history ==
The Chapman-Hall House stands at the eastern end of Damariscotta's downtown area, northwest of the corner of Main, Church, and Vine Streets. It is a single-story wood frame Cape style house, its exterior finished in unpainted wooden shingles. It has a side gable roof with a large central chimney. The main facade is five bays wide, with simple trim surrounding its windows and door, the latter topped by a four-light transom window. The interior features exposed beams, paneled fireplaces, and period plasterwork, and underwent a major restoration in the 1960s, when it first became a museum.

The Damariscotta area was first settled in the 17th century, but permanent settlement did not begin until 1748 due to repeated conflicts with Native Americans. This house was built in 1754 by Nathaniel Chapman, a housewright and half-brother of the area's first permanent settler, Anthony Chapman. Both were natives of Ipswich, Massachusetts, and Nathaniel was convinced to come here by his brother to build houses for the early settlers. Nathaniel Chapman at one time owned all of the area that is now downtown Damariscotta.

In 1960, the house was rescued from demolition by local citizens group, and restored to its 18th-century appearance under the guidance of preservationist Abbott Lowell Cummings. It has served since then as a museum property, since 2008 by the Lincoln County Historical Association.

== See also ==
- National Register of Historic Places listings in Lincoln County, Maine
