= Matthew Cottrill House =

Historic house in Maine, United States

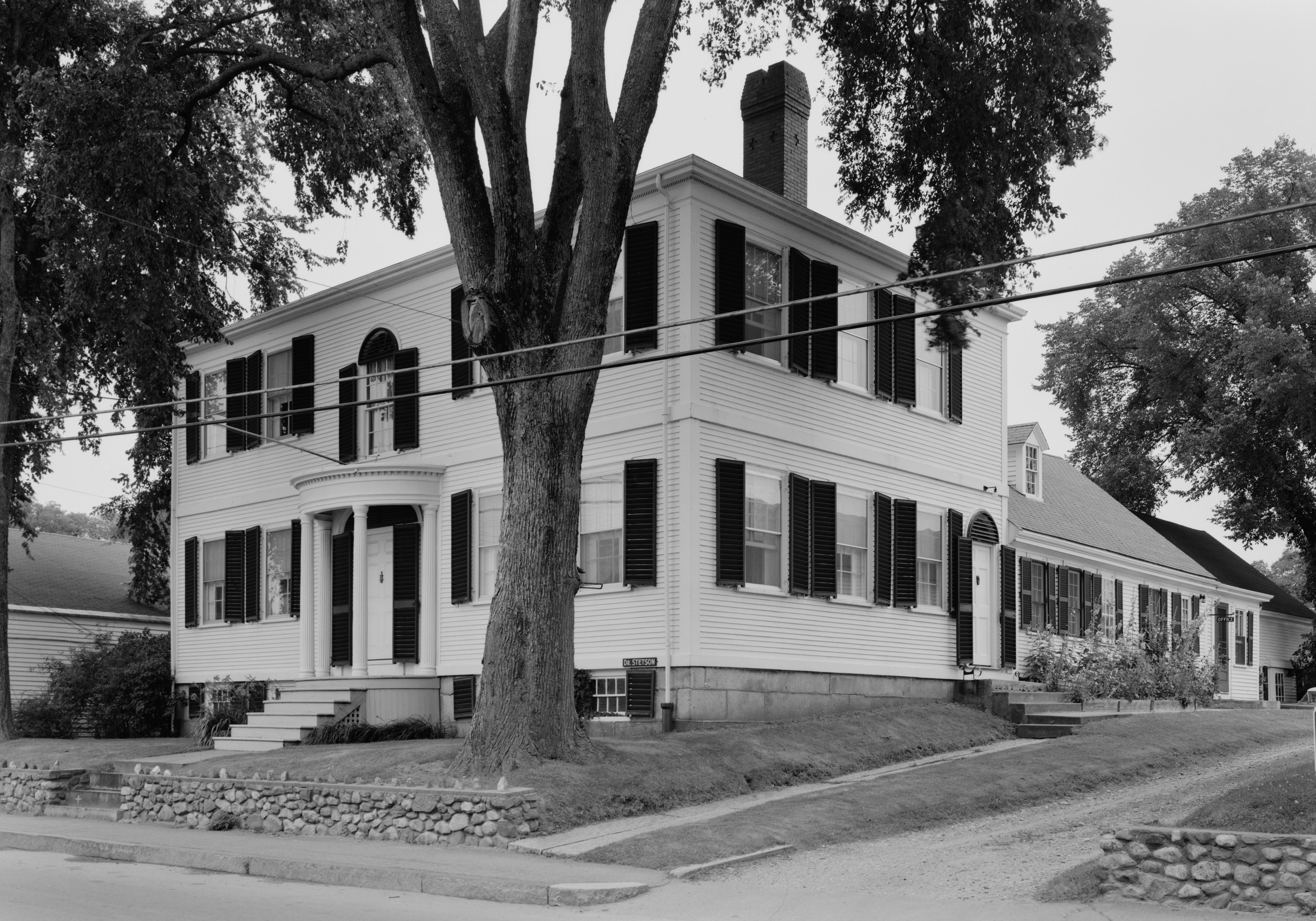
- Interactive map of the Matthew Cottrill House area

General information
- Architectural style: Federal
- Location: Main Street (U.S. 1), Damariscotta, Maine, US

Design and construction
- Architect: Nicholas Codd
- Matthew Cottrill House
- U.S. National Register of Historic Places
- U.S. Historic district – Contributing property
- Location within Maine Location within the United States
- Coordinates: 44°1′50″N 69°32′6″W
- Area: 1 acre (0.4 ha)
- Built: 1801
- Part of: Main Street Historic District (ID79000154)
- NRHP reference No.: 74000177

Significant dates
- Added to NRHP: May 2, 1974
- Designated CP: August 10, 1979

The Matthew Cottrill House is a historic house at 60 Main Street in Damariscotta, Maine. Built in 1801, it is a well-preserved example of Federal period architecture. It is historically significant for its association with Matthew Cottrill, an Irish immigrant who was, along with business partner James Kavanagh, a major economic force in Damariscotta, and also a key force in establishing the Roman Catholic church in Maine. The house was listed on the National Register of Historic Places on May 2, 1974.

== Description and history ==
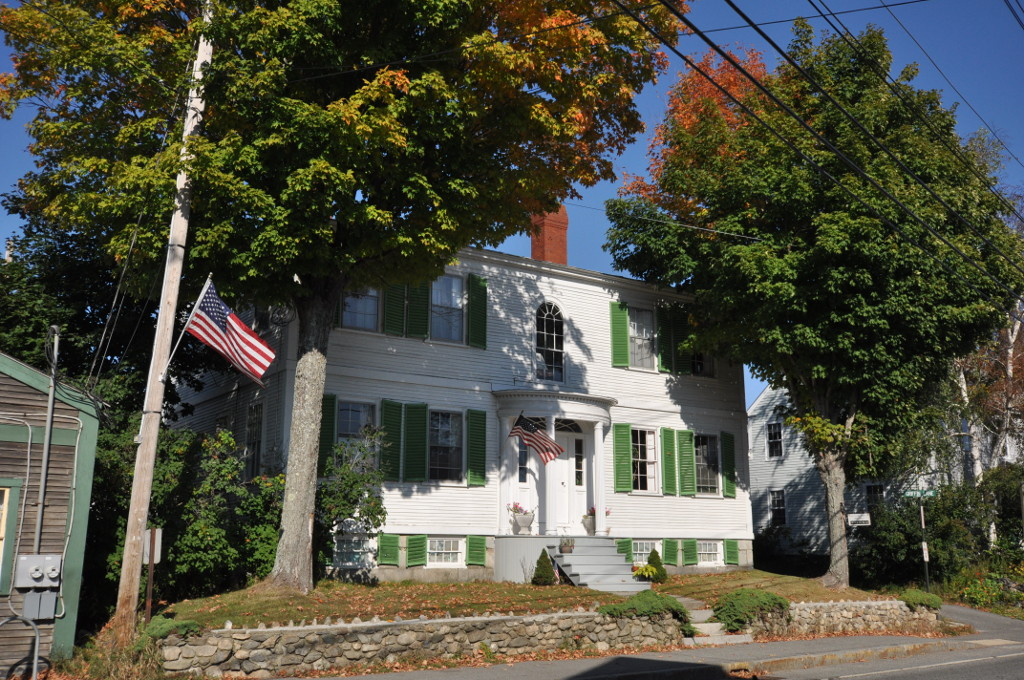
The house in 2014

The Matthew Cottrill House stands on the north side of Main Street in downtown Damariscotta. It is a two-story wood-frame structure, with a low-pitch hip roof, clapboard siding, and a granite foundation. The front facade is symmetrically arranged, with five bays. The outer bays have sash windows with shutters, while the main entrance is in the center bay, sheltered by a half-round portico with Doric columns supporting a plain frieze. Above the entrance is a smaller sash window, topped by a half-round fan. A long single-story ell, probably built before the current main block, extends the building to the rear.

The ell of the house is believed to have been built about 1760, by members of the locally prominent Chapman family. The main block was built in 1801 by Nicholas Codd for Matthew Cottrill. Both Codd and Cottrill were Irish immigrants; Codd was a builder in Boston, Massachusetts who was invited to the Damariscotta area by Rev. Francis Matignon. He is credited with construction of several fine houses in addition to this one, as well as St. Patrick's Catholic Church in Damariscotta Mills (part of Newcastle), the oldest Catholic church in the state. Cottrill and his friend and business partner James Kavanagh (for whom Codd built a house in Damariscotta Mills) were a major economic force in the Damariscotta area, operating mills, shipyards, and ships on the Damariscotta River.

== See also ==
- National Register of Historic Places listings in Lincoln County, Maine
