= Damariscotta Baptist Church =

Historic church in Maine, United States

- U.S. National Register of Historic Places
- U.S. Historic district – Contributing property
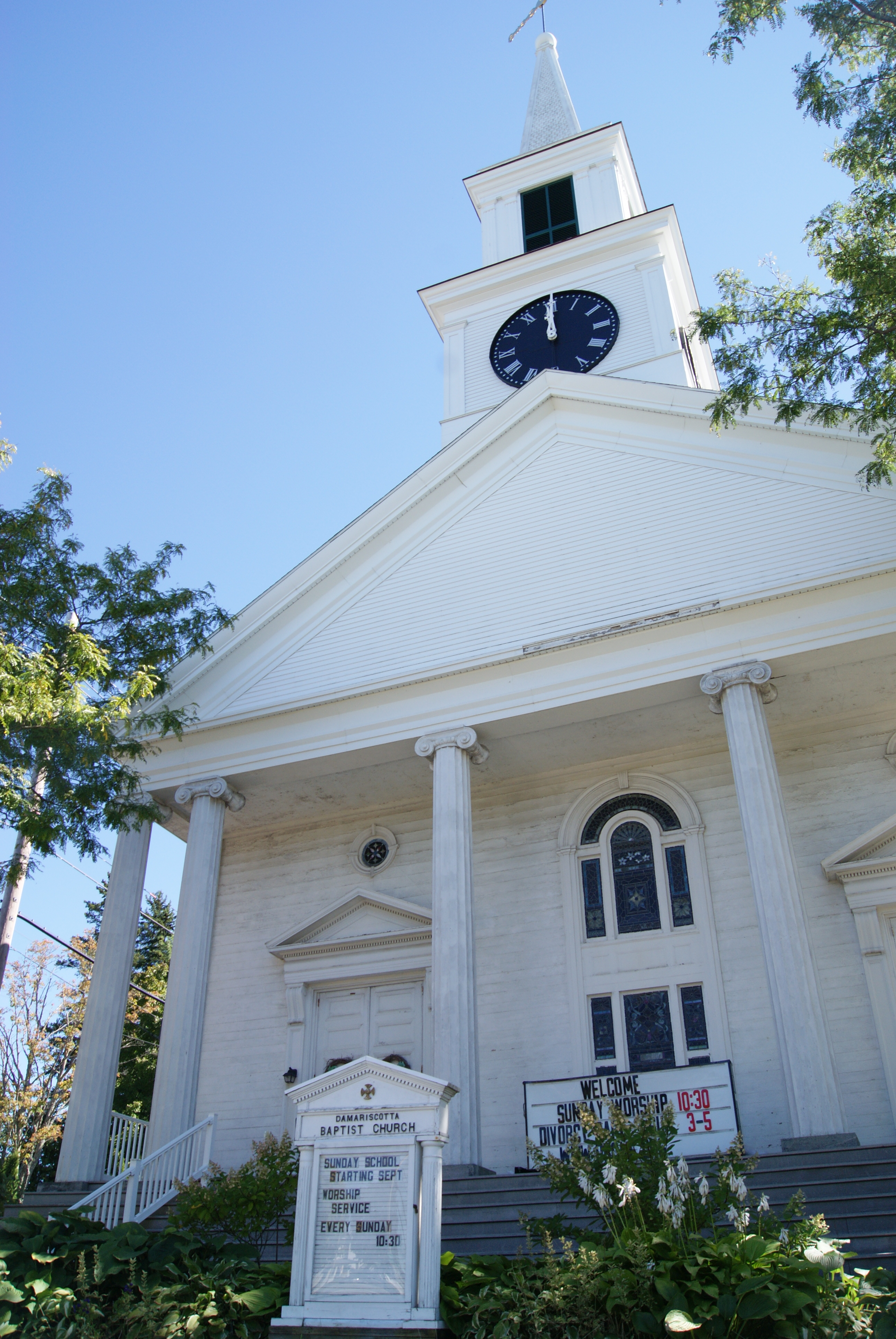
- The church in September 2013

- Location within Maine Location within the United States
- Location: 4 Bristol Rd., Damariscotta, Maine
- Coordinates: 44°1′53″N 69°31′47″W
- Area: 1 acre (0.40 ha)
- Built: 1843
- Architect: Samuel Melcher
- Architectural style: Colonial Revival, Greek Revival
- Part of: Main Street Historic District (2001 increase) (ID00001636)
- NRHP reference No.: 85001265

Significant dates
- Added to NRHP: June 20, 1985
- Designated CP: January 22, 2001

Damariscotta Baptist Church is a historic church at 4 Bristol Road in Damariscotta, Maine, United States. Built in 1843-47 and restyled in 1891, it is a well-preserved example of Greek Revival and Colonial Revival architecture. The building also played a role in the formation of the town, and was listed on the National Register of Historic Places in 1985.

== Description and history ==
The Damariscotta Baptist Church stands at the eastern end of the town's Main Street commercial district, at the southeast corner of the junction of Main Street (Business Route 1) and Bristol Road (Maine State Route 129). The location is prominently visible from a significant portion of Main Street, and the church is set on a low rise. It is a single-story wood frame structure, with a gable roof, flushboarded front facade, and clapboarded sides and rear. A multi-stage square tower rises above the front, with a clock set in the first stage, a belfry in the second, with a steeple above. The front is dominated by a gabled Greek Revival temple front, with a full pediment and entablature supported by six Ionic columns. Windows on the sides are multi-pane stained glass, with a central round-arch element.

The church congregation was organized in 1819 as the Second Baptist Church in Nobleboro. When Damariscotta was set off from Nobleboro in 1848, its name was formally changed to Damariscotta Baptist Church, and the town's first organizational meeting was held in this building. It was constructed between 1843 and 1847, with stylistic evidence suggesting it was designed by Brunswick architect Samuel Melcher. Originally fitted with lancet-arched windows in the Gothic style, alterations in 1891 included the conversion of these windows to the rounded windows now found on the building.

== See also ==
- National Register of Historic Places listings in Lincoln County, Maine
