= Gov. Edward Kavanaugh House =

Historic house in Maine, United States

- Gov. Edward Kavanagh House
- U.S. National Register of Historic Places
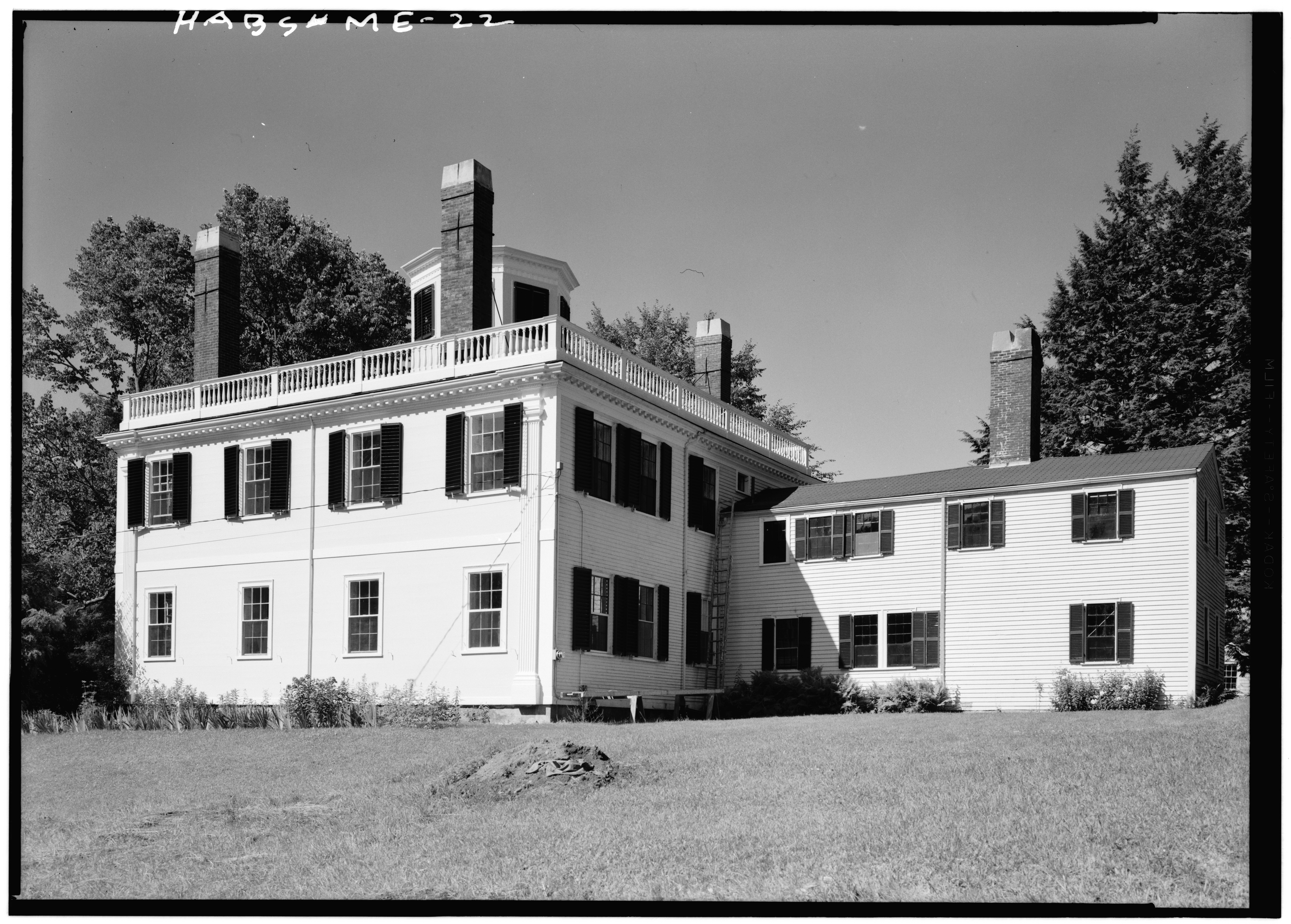
- c. 1960 HABS photo

- Location within Maine Location within the United States
- Location: ME 215 (Damariscotta Mills), Newcastle, Maine
- Coordinates: 44°3′29″N 69°32′5″W
- Area: 2 acres (0.81 ha)
- Built: 1803
- Architect: Codd, Nicholas
- Architectural style: Federal
- NRHP reference No.: 74000178
- Added to NRHP: May 3, 1974

The Gov. Edward Kavanagh House is a historic house on Maine State Route 215 in the Damariscotta Mills area of Newcastle, Maine. Built in 1803, it is a fine example of Federal period residential architecture, and is historically notable for its association with one of Maine's early Irish Catholic immigrants, James Kavanagh. The house was later home to his son, Maine Governor Edward Kavanagh. It was listed on the National Register of Historic Places on May 3, 1974.

== Description and history ==
The Kavanagh House is located just west of the village of Damariscotta Mills, between Pond Road (SR 215) and Damariscotta Lake to the north. The house is a large two-story structure, approximately 45' square, with a hip roof topped by an octagonal cupola. It rests on a granite foundation, and its front and east facades are finished in flushboard siding with wide pilasters, while the west and north are finished in clapboards. The roof is encircled by a low balustrade, and has a dentillated cornice. The main facade is five bays wide, with the entrance at the center, set in a round-arch opening with a half-round fan above the door. The entrance is sheltered by a half-round porch, supported by Ionic columns, which rise to an entablature and balustrade. Above the entry is a Palladian-style three-part window, flanked by narrow pilasters, with a fan louver above the center window.

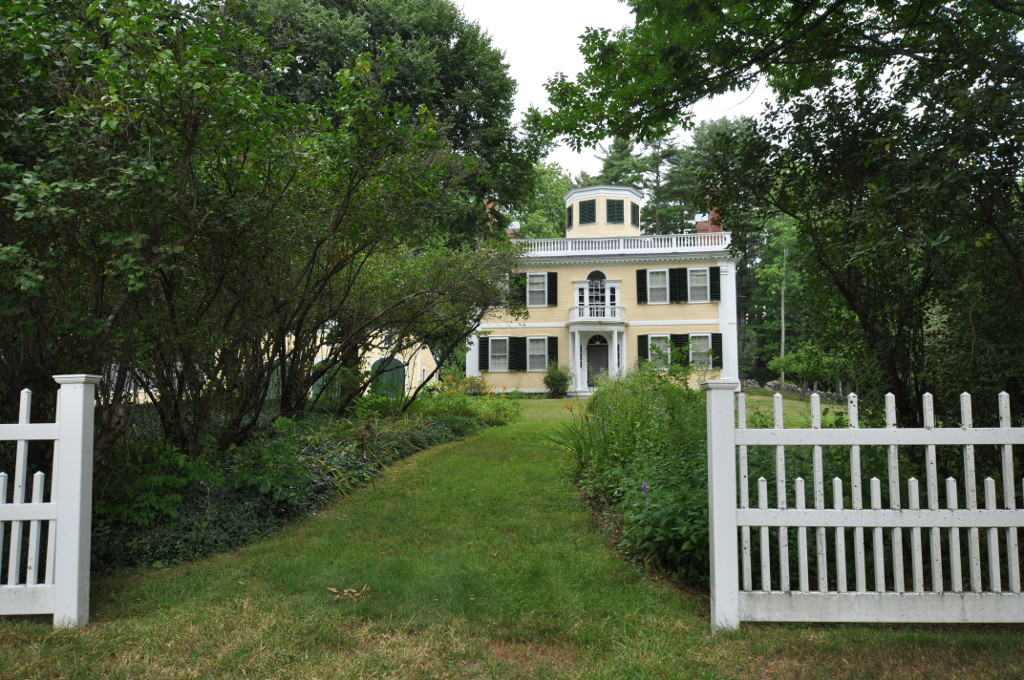
The house in 2018

The house was built in 1803, and is one of Maine's most sophisticated examples of Federal architecture. It was built by Nicholas Codd, an Irish immigrant and housewright who is also credited with the Matthew Cottrill House in Damariscotta, and the brick St. Patrick's Catholic Church which stands near this house. Codd, apparently based in Boston, Massachusetts, was lured to work in this area by James Kavanagh and Matthew Cottrill, both early Irish immigrants to the area. They were successful businessmen, and James Kavanagh's son Edward became Governor of Maine in 1843, finishing the term of John Fairfield, who had won election to the United States Senate.

== See also ==
- National Register of Historic Places listings in Lincoln County, Maine
