= Whaleback Shell Midden =

Historic site in Maine, United States

- Damariscotta Oyster Shell Heaps
- U.S. National Register of Historic Places
- U.S. Historic district – Contributing property
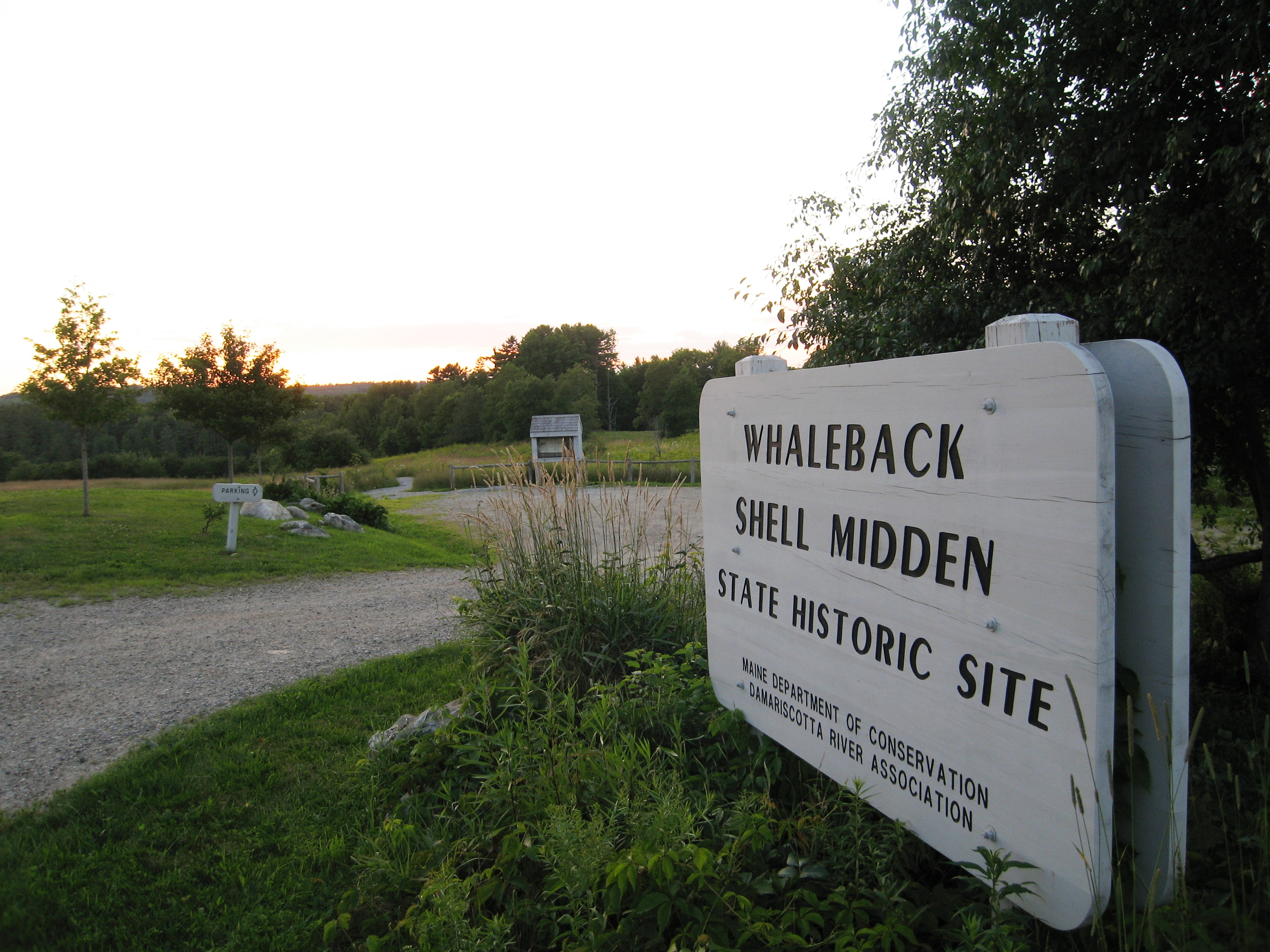
- Entrance to state historic site

- Location within Maine
- Interactive map of Damariscotta Oyster Shell Heaps
- Location: Damariscotta, Maine
- Coordinates: 44°02′31″N 69°30′47″W
- Area: 11 acres (4.5 ha)
- Part of: Damariscotta Shell Midden Historic District (ID98001238)
- NRHP reference No.: 69000027

Significant dates
- Added to NRHP: December 30, 1969
- Designated CP: October 8, 1998

Whaleback Shell Midden is a shell midden consisting primarily of oyster shells located on the east side of the Damariscotta River in Maine, United States. It is preserved as a Maine state historic site and was included as part of the Damariscotta Oyster Shell Heaps listed on the National Register of Historic Places in 1969. Other shell middens are located on the estuary in Damariscotta and Newcastle. The middens in this area were formed between about 200 BC to AD 1000. Maine's indigenous people consider shell middens to be more than refuse heaps, and have asserted that middens are also landmarks and place markers that represent the continued occupation of sites over thousands of years.

The midden originally had three main layers of shells. In the bottom two layers, shells were generally 5–8 inches (10–20 cm) long. These two layers are separated by a layer of soil, and the middle layer is mixed with animal bones. The top layer contains smaller shells. Artifacts suggest that successive tribes of prehistoric people used the area. The top layer was deposited by members of the Abenaki tribes that fished in the area in the summer.

Originally, the Whaleback midden was more than thirty feet deep, more than 1,650 feet (500 metres) in length, and a width varying from 1,320 to 1,650 feet (400–500 metres). It got its name from its shape. Only a small portion of this midden remains today; much of it was processed into chicken feed from 1886 to 1891 by the Massachusetts-based Damariscotta Shell and Fertilizer company, eroded by rising sea levels, or looted. Because of this, the Glidden midden, across the river in Newcastle, is now the largest in Maine and the largest on the U.S. east coast north of Georgia.

== Climate and culture ==
Early people in Maine were influenced by a changing climate largely shaped by glacial processes. The Late Wisconsinan Laurentide Ice Sheet (LIS) covered Maine's landscape 35,000 years ago, extending far into the ocean. As the climate warmed and the ice sheet retreated, Maine's landscape underwent deglaciation from 14,500 to 11,000 BCE. Due to isostatic rebound, a geological process in which the earth "rebounds" from the depression of a glacier, sea levels fluctuated immensely. At the start of the deglaciation, sea level was much higher inland; the landscape at the time would have resembled modern-day northern Alaska. This promoted hunter-gatherer practices that could respond more quickly to changing climates. As the glacier retreated, sea levels dropped, as low as 180 feet below what we now recognize as the coast of Maine. Over the last few thousands of years, the sea level has slowly risen, creating Maine's large littoral zones recognizable to humans today.

The Archaic Period of human culture was taking place from about 3,500 to 9,000 years ago, characterized by cultures who started to exploit marine resources. There is much speculation about the transhumance of these early peoples. Some posit that settlement occupation caused populations of people to live inland during the summer and by the coast during the winter, but there is little archaeological evidence to suggest this, and it's more likely that there were ethnic boundaries between groups of people and that transhumance was not occurring, meaning that populations were staying coastal or inland year-round.

The middens suggest the Damariscotta River had been used by humans as early as 5,000 years ago.

== Geology of Damariscotta ==
The Damariscotta middens are notable for their size and their many oysters by a stream that has few today. The large presence is connected to coastal change, sea-level rise, and the geology of the region. The midden is located between two sills, Johnny Orr and Indraft. These sills, volcanic in origin and most likely millions of years old, have influenced the salinity and temperature of the river. In fact, on the oceanside of the Johnny Orr sill, the level of the water at high tide is higher than the level on the riverside.

The Eastern oyster (Crassostrea virginica) makes up a large portion of the shells located in the middens. However, oysters are not present in significant populations in the river today. This has led geologists to the understanding that at some point in time, there was a great deal of change occurring on the banks of the Damariscotta River that influenced the creation of such substantial middens. Oysters tend to like warmer, brackish waters – at some point in time, salty, cold oceanic water breached the Johnny Orr sill, mixed with warmer, less salty riverine water and created an environment that could sustain oyster populations about 2400 B.P. The water may have overtaken the sill as sea levels were slowly rising. The reason for the water coming over the sill still remains a gap in the story of the Damariscotta River.

Though oysters do still exist buried underneath silt near the middens, significant oyster populations no longer exist within the river due to four possible reasons: 1) predator introduction, 2) suffocation from the dust of the sawmill upshore, 3) increasingly saline environments, and 4) lower water temperatures. In all likelihood, it was probably a combination of all of these factors. Damariscotta is just another example of how changes in the climate have influenced human realities.

== Threats to middens ==
Over 2,000 other middens exist along the Maine coast but many of their locations are undisclosed due to fear of looting. Looting is not the only threat they face. As sea levels rise due to climate change, middens like Whaleback have been swept away to the ocean. The thousands of other middens can offer evidence of early-Maine habitation, geology, and biology. For example, one midden site has helped scientists piece together that at one point, there was a great deal of swordfish being caught within the Gulf of Maine despite being a deep-sea fish that could prove difficult to catch with dugouts. This challenges the understanding of early maritime technology.

== State historic site ==
The area around the remains of the Whaleback is a Maine state historic site, first opened for a full season in 2005, with some historical displays and a hiking trail.

== Oyster culturing ==
By 1875 oysters that were once abundant were no longer native to New England waters. Wild populations have been established in recent years by the spawn of aquaculture oysters.

== Gallery ==
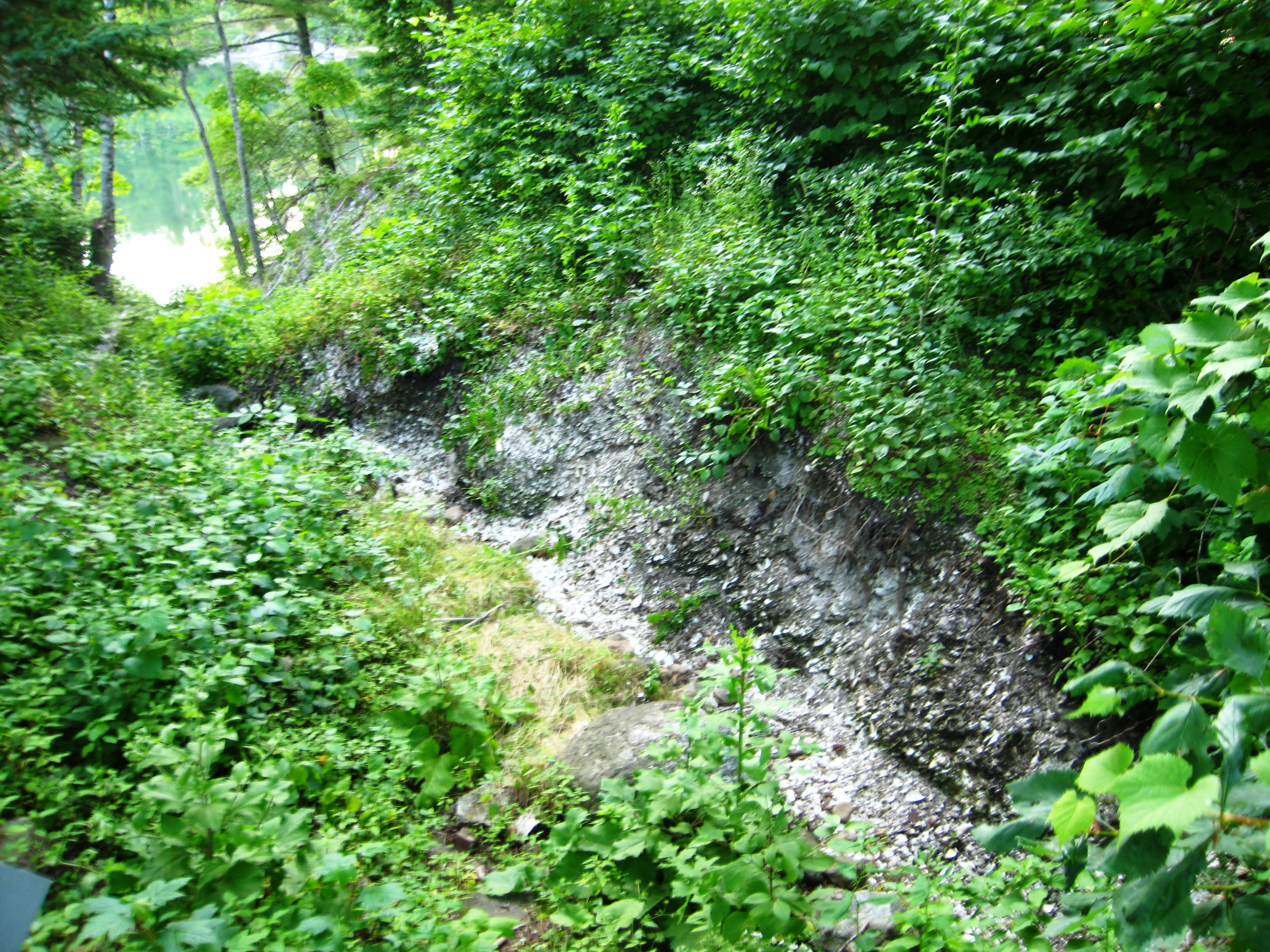
A gully running through the midden to the Damariscotta River.

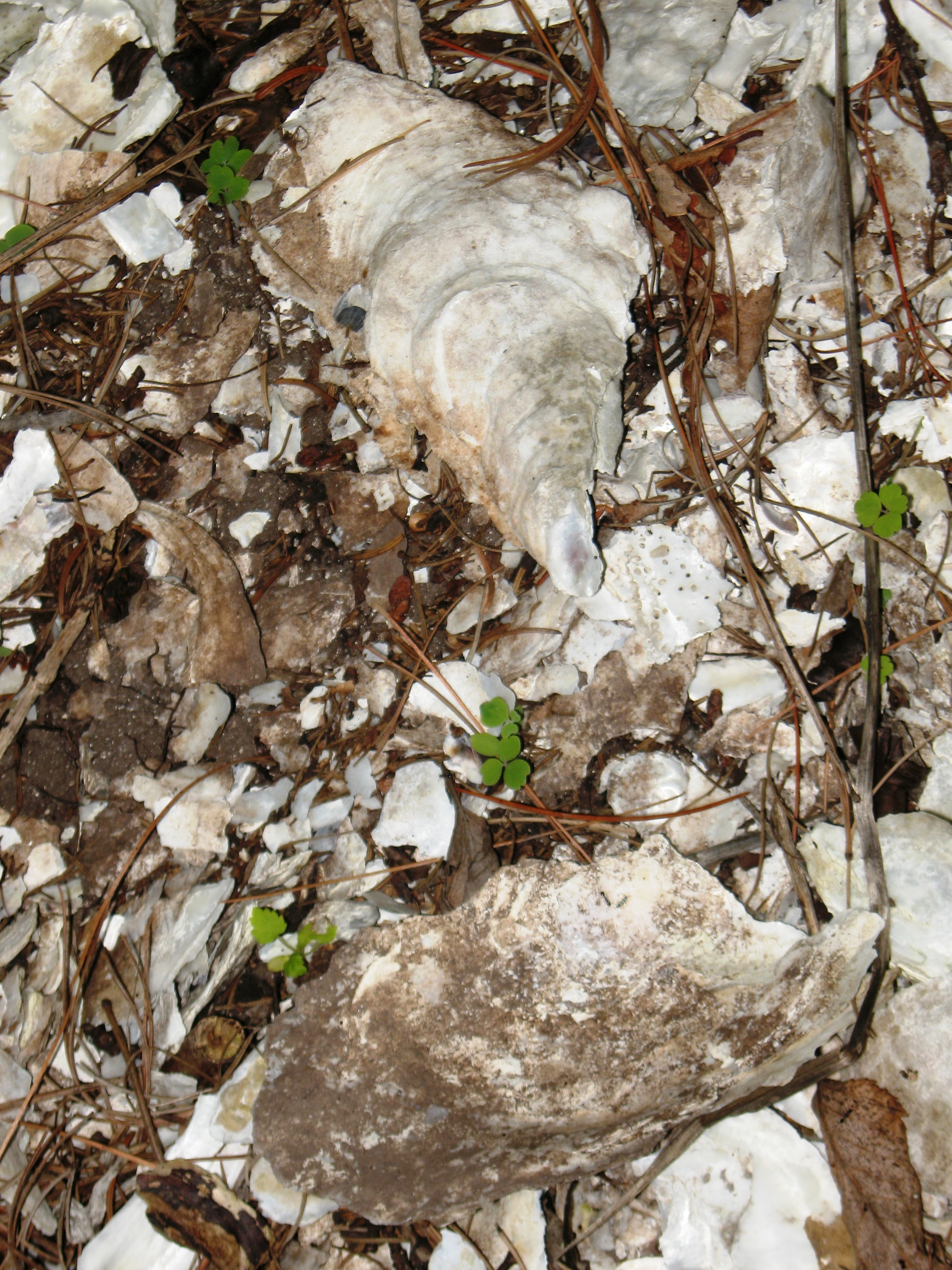
Closeup of one of the thousand-year-old oyster shells.

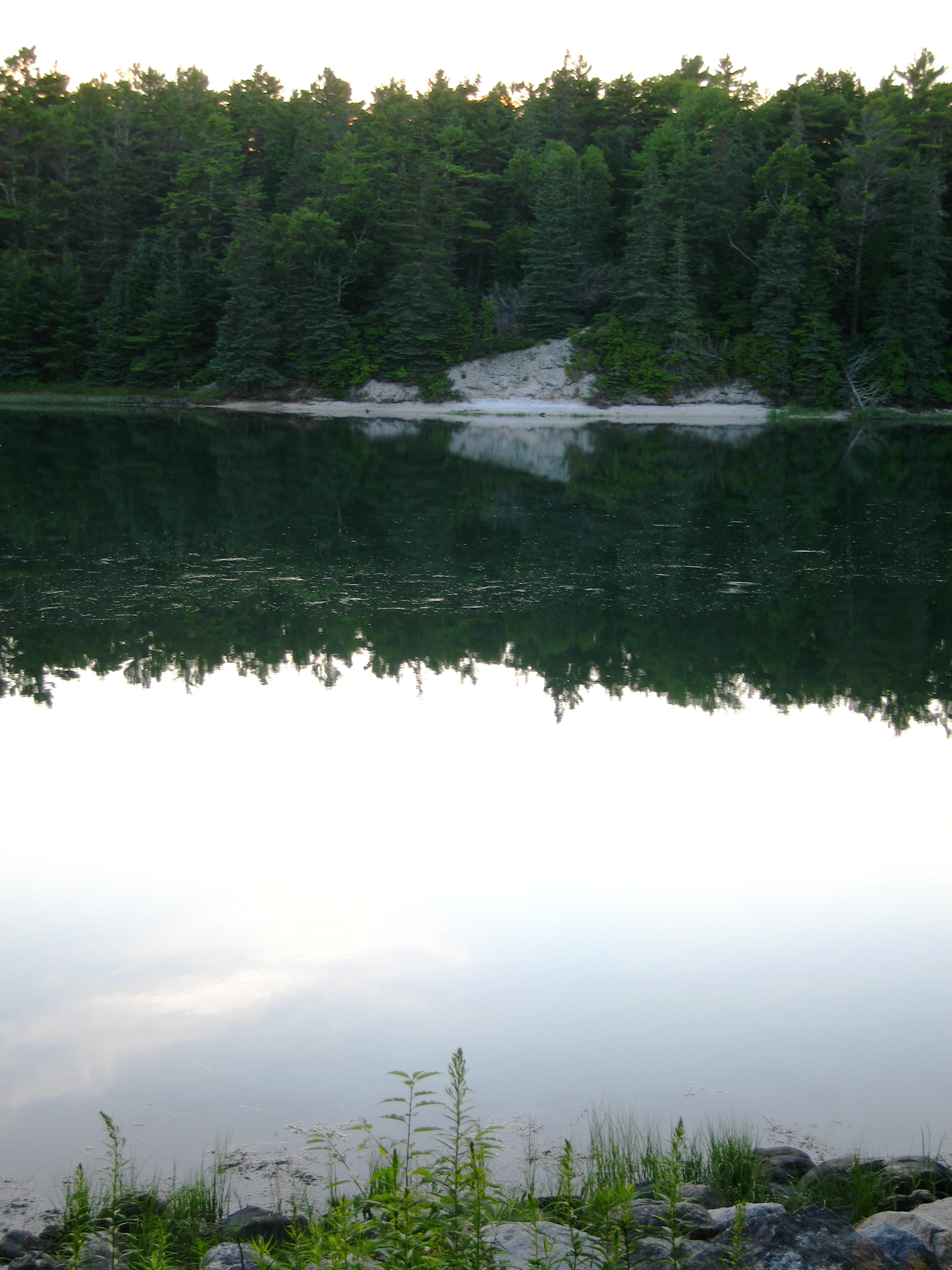
The Glidden Shell Midden is located immediately across the Damariscotta River.

== See also ==
- Damariscotta Shell Midden Historic District
- National Register of Historic Places listings in Lincoln County, Maine
