= North Yarmouth and Freeport Baptist Meetinghouse =

Historic church in Maine, United States

- U.S. National Register of Historic Places
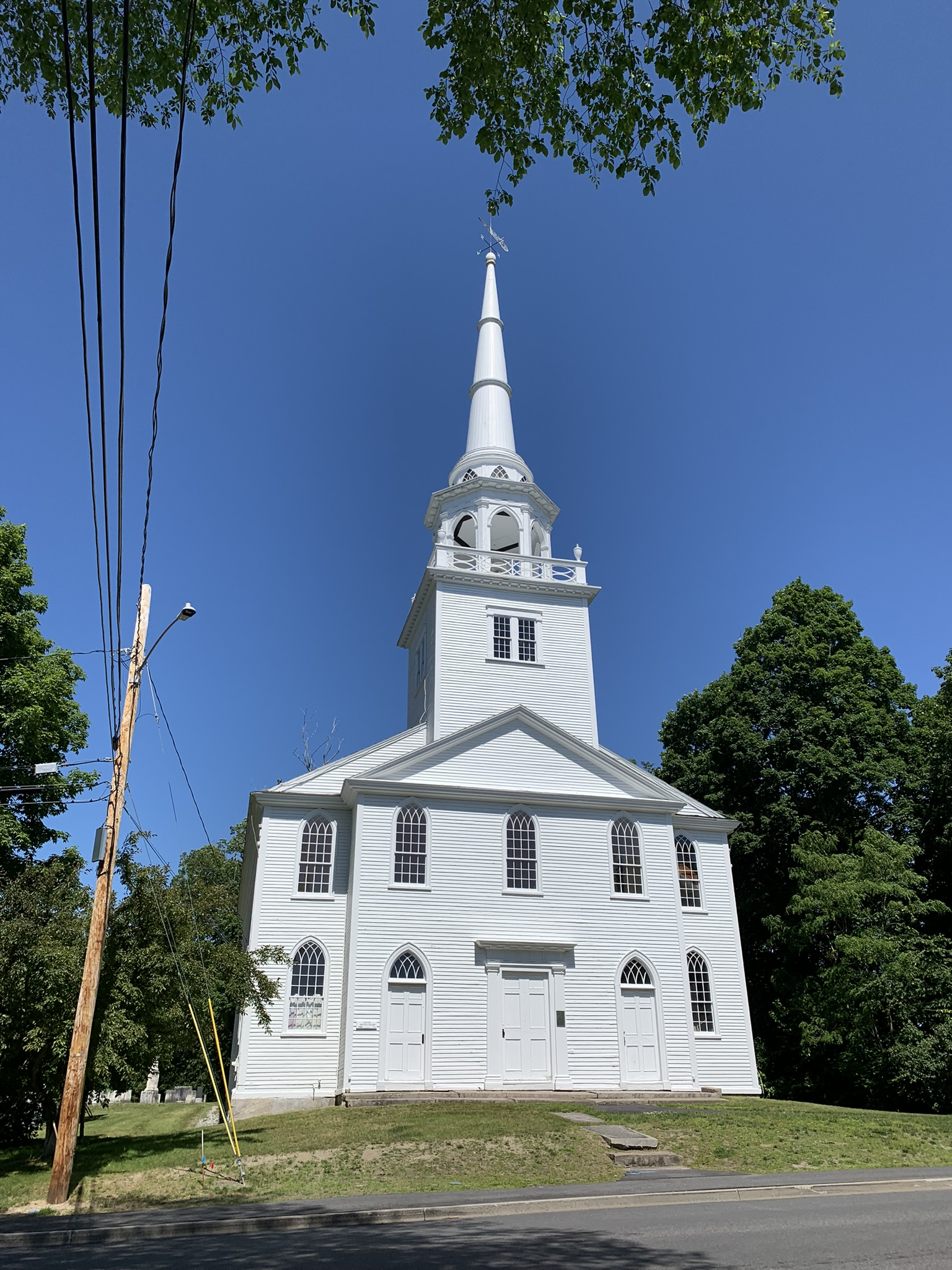
- The meetinghouse in 2022

- Location within Maine Location within the United States
- Location: 3 Hillside St., Yarmouth, Maine
- Coordinates: 43°48′13″N 70°11′46″W
- Area: 1 acre (0.40 ha)
- Built: 1796
- Architect: Capt. Samuel Melcher; Anthony Raymond
- Architectural style: Colonial, Federal, Gothic and Greek Revival
- NRHP reference No.: 78000174
- Added to NRHP: November 20, 1978

The North Yarmouth and Freeport Baptist Meetinghouse, also known as the Old Baptist Meeting House, is an historic church on Hillside Street in Yarmouth, Maine. Built in 1796 and twice altered in the 19th century, it is believed to be the oldest surviving church built for a Baptist congregation in the state of Maine. It is now owned by the town and maintained by a local non-profit organization.

== Description ==
The North Yarmouth and Freeport Baptist Meetinghouse is located on the west side of Hillside Street, a short way south of Maine State Route 115 on the west side of Yarmouth village. It is a tall single-story wood frame structure, with a gabled roof and clapboard siding. The front facade is five bays wide, the central three projecting in a gable-topped section from which the church tower rises. The central section has three doors, the outer ones topped by lancet-arched windows, the center one framed by pilasters and a corniced entablature. Windows on the front are tall lancet-arched sash, while those on the sides are rectangular sash. The tower has a square first stage, with an open octagonal belfry topped by a conical flush-boarded spire.

== History ==
The church building was constructed in 1796 by the local Baptist congregation. Reverend Thomas Green, one of its seven original members, was elected its first pastor. In 1889 the Baptist congregation moved to its current location at 346 Main Street. The following year, George W. Hammond and his wife, Ellen, purchased the meetinghouse and re-opened it as the Hillside Library and Antiquarian Society. In 1910 they donated the building to the town, and it was used for town meetings until 1946. During World War II the building was used by the Civilian Defense System as an observation post, looking for enemy aircraft. In 1946 the Village Improvement Society took over responsibility for the interior of the building. The building was added to the National Register of Historic Places in 1978. Major renovations occurred in the early 2000s. The building is currently available for weddings and other events.

== Cemetery ==
The Old Baptist Cemetery is adjacent to the meetinghouse on its southern side. Immediately inside the gate, on the left-hand side, is a billboard-style trio of gravestones — one of two in the cemetery, but only around forty are known to have been found in Maine.

== See also ==
- National Register of Historic Places listings in Cumberland County, Maine
