= Skidompha Public Library =

Coordinates: 44.0325361°N 69.5305791°W

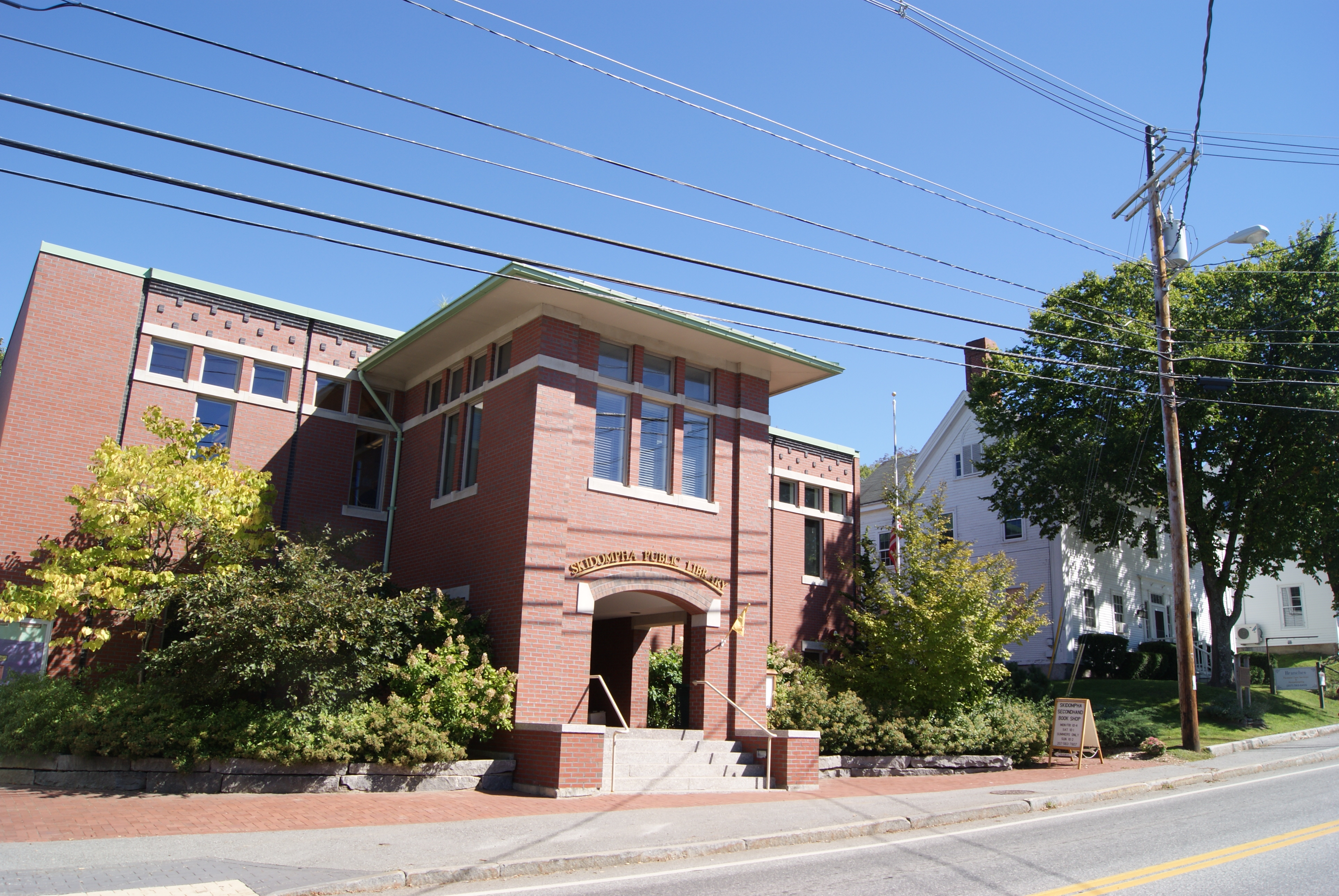
- Skidompha Public Library, Main Street
- Location: Damariscotta, Maine, United States
- Type: Public
- Established: 1905

Collection
- Size: 1,177,921 (2021)

Access and use
- Circulation: 47,049 (2021)
- Population served: 5,613

Other information
- Director: Matthew Graff
- Employees: 8
- Website: www.skidompha.org

The Skidompha Public Library is the public library serving the towns of Damariscotta, Newcastle, and Nobleboro, Maine.

== History ==
On March 13, 1905, the Skidompha Library Association was incorporated and its collection of 1,476 books was given to the three towns (Damariscotta, Newcastle and Nobleboro) as the start of a Free Public Library. The library was established over the Charles M. Jones Grocery Store on Main Street. In 1922, the Library Association and Women's Club of Damariscotta purchased the Stephen Coffin House which served as a library and meeting place until 2001, when the larger, current facility on Main Street opened.

"SKIDOMPHA" is an acronym formed from letters in the names of Skidompha's founding club members:

- S – Ellie Stetson
- K – Judie and Addie Kelsey
- I – Ida Benner
- D – Mrs. James David
- O – Mrs. Osman Plummer
- M – Mr. and Mrs. Charles Merry
- P – Mary Pinkham
- H – William K. Hilton
- A – Jennie Ames

== Awards and recognition ==
Skidompha Public Library was awarded the prestigious National Medal for Museum and Library Service, the nation's highest honor for museums and libraries, from the Institute of Museum and Library Services (IMLS) in 2008. Skidompha was one of just five libraries in the United States selected to receive the medal for its outstanding community engagement, services and innovative programming for adults learning to read, senior citizens, young reluctant readers and more. The award ceremony was held at the White House in Washington, D.C., with First Lady, Laura Bush (also a librarian), presiding.

The library is one of the few libraries in Maine designated as a "Star Library" by Library Journal.
