= Winter Street Church =

Historic church in Maine, United States

- U.S. National Register of Historic Places
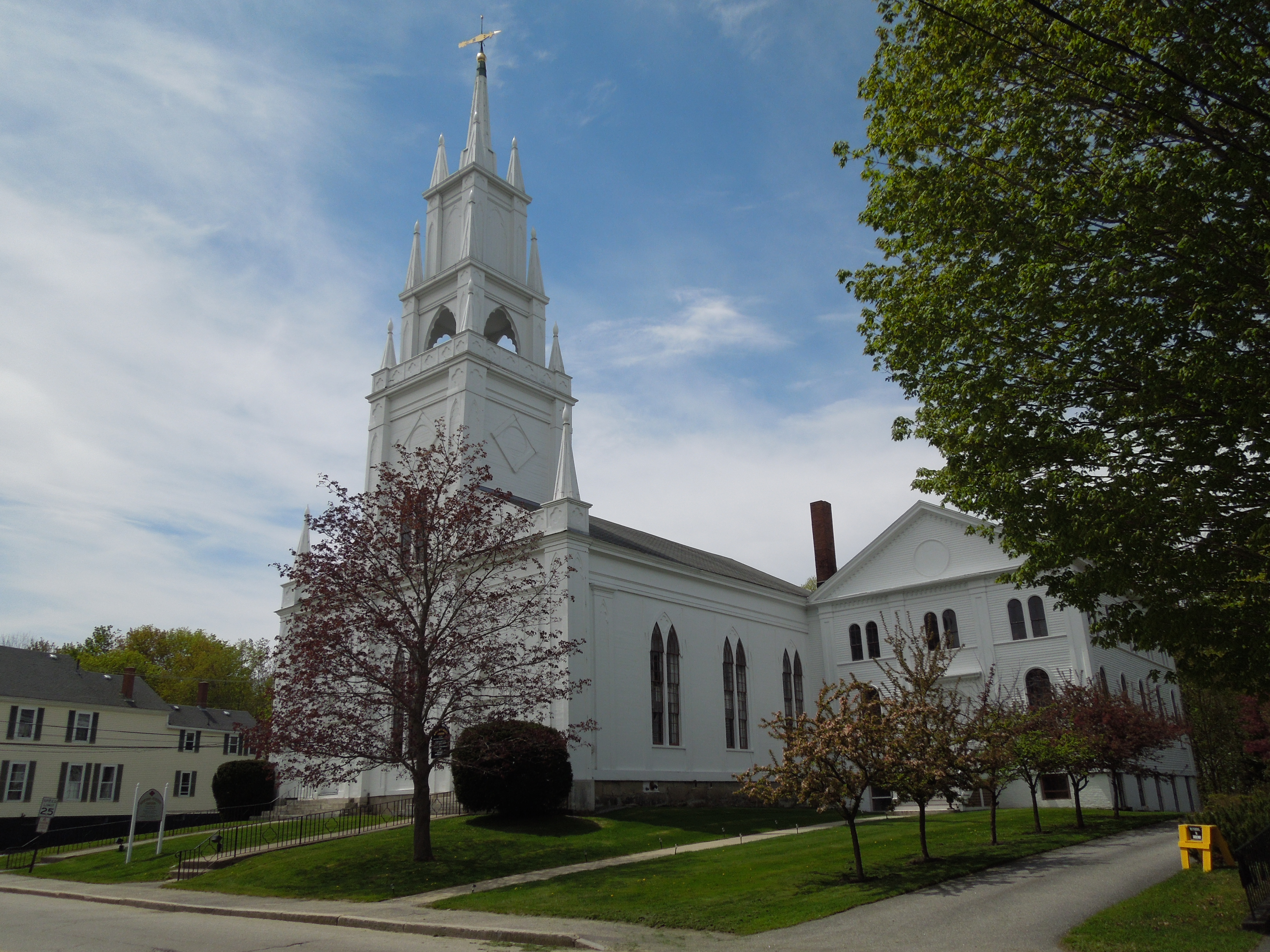

- Location within Maine Location within the United States
- Location: Corner of Washington and Winter Sts., Bath, Maine
- Coordinates: 43°54′56.4″N 69°48′59.2″W
- Area: 1 acre (0.40 ha)
- Built: 1843
- Architect: Anthony Raymond
- Architectural style: Gothic Revival
- NRHP reference No.: 71000044
- Added to NRHP: July 27, 1971

The Winter Street Church, originally known as the Winter Street Congregational Church, is an historic former Congregational church at 880 Washington Street, corner of Winter Street in Bath, Sagadahoc County, Maine. Built in 1843-44, it is a fine early example of Gothic Revival architecture, designed and built by a local master builder. It was listed on the National Register of Historic Places on July 27, 1971. The building was saved from destruction by Sagadahoc Preservation Inc. in 1971, and is now called the Winter Street Center.

== Description and history ==
The former Winter Street Church stands just north of Bath's downtown area, facing Library Park at the northwest corner of Washington and Winter Streets. It is a single-story wood-frame structure, with a gabled roof topped by a multistage square tower. The main facade is divided into three bays, separated by pilasters that have Gothic arched panels, with those at the corners topped by pinnacles. The outer bays have entrances topped by Gothic arches and flanked by pilasters that rise to curved moulding over the arches. The center bay has a pair of Gothic windows flanked by slender arched panels. The tower has four stages, each with pinnacles and paneled pilasters at the corners; the belfry is open, and a steeple caps the structure.

The church was built in 1843-44 by Anthony Raymond, a local master builder, and is an important early example of the Gothic Revival in New England. In 1848, due to its large enrollment, the sanctuary space was enlarged by reducing the size of the vestibule. In 1898 the interior was redesigned by Portland architect John Calvin Stevens. The building was rescued from demolition in 1971 by Sagadahoc Preservation, which purchased the building in 1986, and now operates it as a community center.

== See also ==
- National Register of Historic Places listings in Sagadahoc County, Maine
