= Anthony Raymond =

American architect

Anthony Coombs Raymond
- Born: June 21, 1798; Harpswell, District of Maine, Massachusetts, U.S.
- Died: June 13, 1879 (aged 80); Bath, Maine, U.S.
- Resting place: Growstown Cemetery, Brunswick, Maine, U.S.
- Occupation: Architect
- Buildings: Winter Street Church, Bath, Maine

Anthony Coombs Raymond (June 21, 1798 – June 13, 1879) was an American architect active in the first half of the 19th century. He was responsible for several churches and homes in the area of the Kennebec River in Maine.

== Life and career ==
Raymond was born in Harpswell, Maine, on June 21, 1798, to Edward Raymond and Lydia Coombs.

He began his career as an architect at the age of 18.

In 1821, he married Aletta Alexander, but she died nine years later, aged 27 or 28. He married again, to Mary Whitehouse.

His work on the Universalist Church in Bath, Maine, resulted in his moving to the community.

=== Death ===
Raymond died on June 13, 1879, in Bath, Maine. He was 80 years old. He is interred in Growstown Cemetery in Brunswick, Maine, alongside both of his wives. Mary survived him by twenty years.

== Selected notable works ==
- Maine Hall, Bowdoin College, Brunswick, Maine (1836)
- North Yarmouth and Freeport Baptist Meetinghouse, Yarmouth, Maine (1837 alteration)
- Universalist Church, Bath, Maine (1839)
- Winter Street Church, Bath, Maine (1843)
