= Damariscotta River =

River in the United States of America

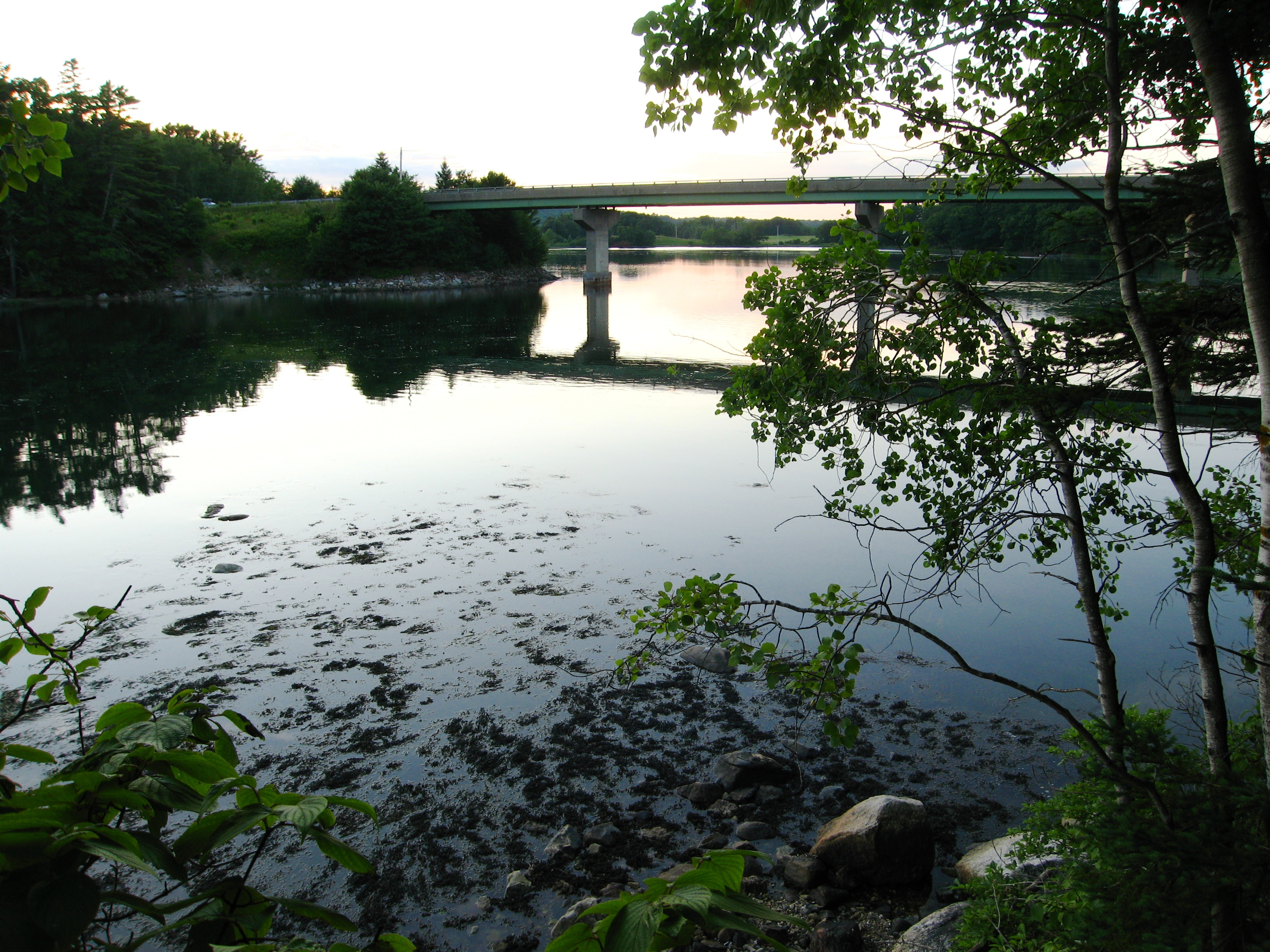
- Damariscotta River Sunset

Location
- Country: United States

Physical characteristics
- Source
  - location: Damariscotta Lake
  - elevation: 72 feet (22 m)
- Mouth
  - location: Gulf of Maine, Atlantic Ocean
  - coordinates: 43°49′05″N 69°34′15″W
  - elevation: sea level
- Length: 12 miles (19 km)

The Damariscotta River is a 19.0-mile-long (30.6 km) tidal river in Lincoln County, Maine, that empties into the Atlantic Ocean. Damariscotta is an old Abenaki word for "river of many fishes". There are 2,500-year-old oyster shell middens (heaps) along the banks of the Damariscotta River, which occupies a drowned river valley leading to the Gulf of Maine, a large embayment of the Atlantic Ocean.

The Damariscotta River begins at the outlet of Damariscotta Lake, at Damariscotta Mills, a village straddling the boundary between the towns of Newcastle and Nobleboro. Damariscotta Lake extends 12 miles (19 km) north into the town of Jefferson and is fed from tributaries originating as far north as Washington and Somerville, Maine. From the lake's outlet, the Damariscotta River drops 50 feet (15 m) over just 0.1 miles (0.16 km) through Damariscotta Mills before reaching tidewater, at an arm of the river known as Salt Bay. The tidal Damariscotta flows southward between Newcastle, Edgecomb and Boothbay on the west and Damariscotta, Bristol and South Bristol on the east, reaching the Atlantic Ocean between Linekin Neck on the west and Inner Heron Island on the east.

It is a navigable river for nearly its entire 19-mile (31 km) length, to the bridge between Newcastle and Nobleboro (44°03′36″N 69°31′30″W). It is important in local commerce for tourism, Oyster and Mussel Farming as well as other forms of aquaculture, clamming, marine worming and fishing.

== Damariscotta Mills ==
Damariscotta Mills is a place where locals gather every year (May–June) to celebrate the “Annual Alewife Festival” which sees millions of alewives returning to the Damariscotta River. This festival is attracting more people through the years. The centerpiece of this annual alewife festival is the newly rebuilt/renovated Damariscotta Stone Fish Ladder. This fish ladder was constructed in 1807 to bypass the Damariscotta Mills Dam but the fish ladder was falling into dis-repair by 2007. With local community support and financing this unique stone fish ladder was fully re-constructed between 2007 and 2013. This reconstitution has once again allowed alewives to increase into the millions along the Damariscotta.

== See also ==
- Whaleback Shell Midden
- Damariscotta River Cruises
- Damariscotta River Association
- Downtown Damariscotta Visitors Information
