= Damariscotta, Maine =

Town in Maine, United States

- Town
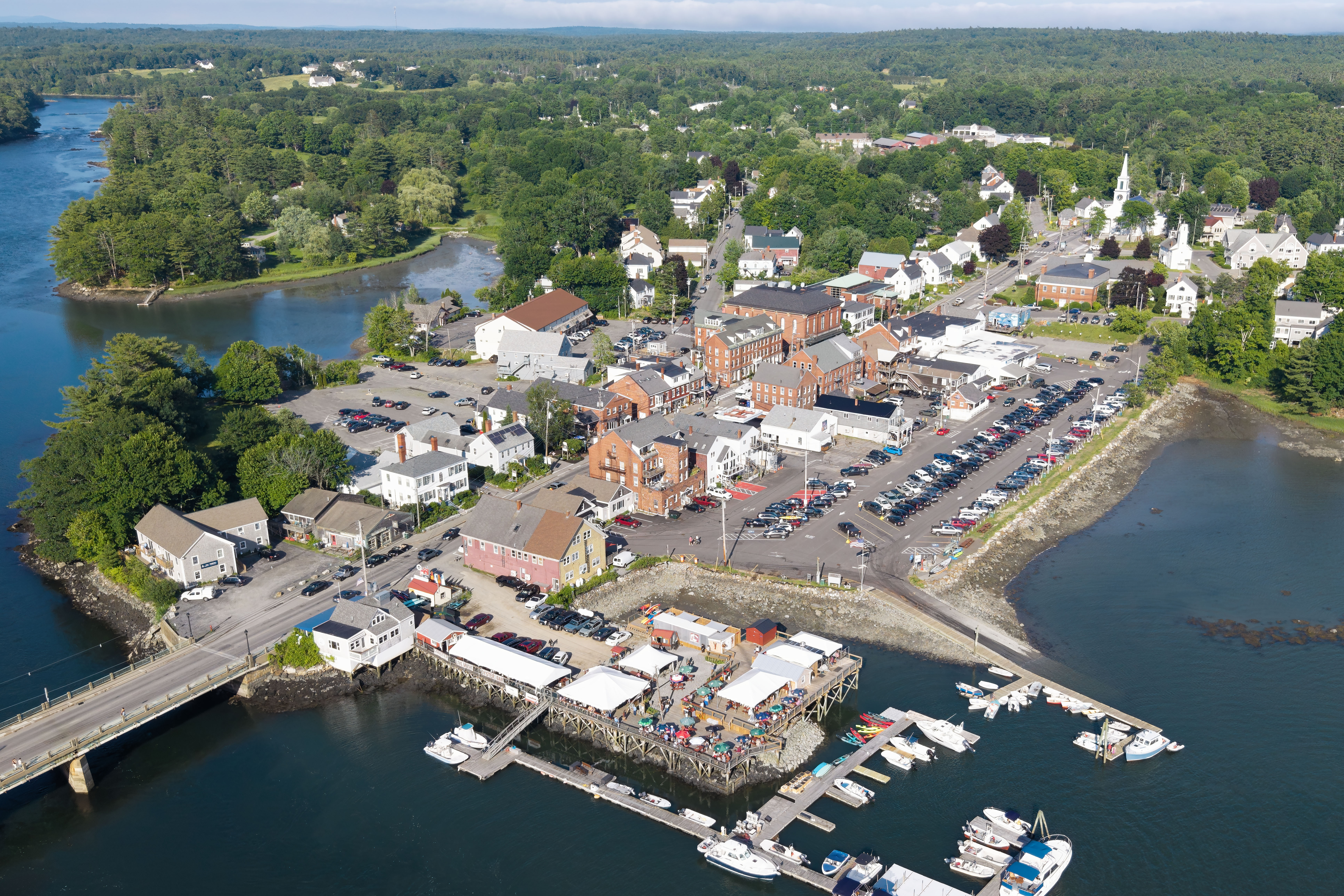
- Downtown, 2026

- Seal

- Location in Lincoln County and the state of Maine.
- Coordinates: 44°01′56″N 69°30′14″W
- Country: United States
- State: Maine
- County: Lincoln
- Incorporated: 1848

Area
  - Total: 14.71 sq mi (38.10 km^{2})
  - Land: 12.42 sq mi (32.17 km^{2})
  - Water: 2.29 sq mi (5.93 km^{2})
- Elevation: 95 ft (29 m)

Population (2020)
  - Total: 2,297
  - Density: 185/sq mi (71.4/km^{2})
- Time zone: UTC-5 (Eastern (EST))
  - Summer (DST): UTC-4 (EDT)
- ZIP code: 04543
- Area code: 207
- FIPS code: 23-16235
- GNIS feature ID: 582432
- Website: www.damariscotta.maine.gov

Damariscotta (/dæmrɪˈskɒtə/ DAM-rih-SKOT-ə) is a town in Lincoln County, Maine, United States. The population was 2,297 at the 2020 census. A popular tourist destination known for its oysters, the towns of Damariscotta and Newcastle are linked by the Main Street bridge over the Damariscotta River, forming the "Twin Villages". The name Damariscotta derives from an Algonquian word 'Madamescontee' which means place of abundance of small fish (alewives), and is shared with a census-designated place located within the town.

== History ==
The area was once traversed by Abenaki Indians, who left behind 2,500-year-old oyster shell middens along the banks of the Damariscotta River. The Whaleback Shell Midden is now a state historic site. The land became part of the Pemaquid Patent, granted by the Plymouth Council in 1631 to Robert Aldsworth and Gyles Elbridge, merchants from Bristol, England. At Pemaquid (now Bristol), they built a fort and trading post.

Some colonists moved upriver from the village at Pemaquid about 1640 to settle what is today Damariscotta. But the settlements were attacked in 1676 during King Philip's War, with the inhabitants either driven off or massacred. Attempts to rebuild alternated with further attacks during the French and Indian Wars. The Province of Massachusetts Bay constructed Fort William Henry at Pemaquid in 1692, but it was destroyed in 1696. The last battle of King William's War was on September 9, the Battle of Damariscotta, in which Captain John March killed 25 native men.

Fort Frederick, in 1729, successfully resisted the region's final two attacks, and was pulled down at the time of the Revolution so that the British could not occupy it. With peace at last, Damariscotta grew as a trade center. It was incorporated as a separate town on March 15, 1848, set off from parts of Bristol and Nobleboro.

=== Damariscotta Etymology ===
There are at least two claims for the origin of Damariscotta.

1. The name Damariscotta is an extreme corruption of the Algonquian word "Madamescontee", meaning "place of an abundance of alewives", which are small, salty fish that spawn in Damariscotta Lake.
2. The name Darmiscotta was a derivative of Damariscove, mentioned in the 1631 Pemaquid Patent depicting the surrounding water. "Damaris" is of Greek origin meaning gentle or calf. Used as feminine name in the Holy Bible, Book of Acts, Damaris was an inspired Athenean convert. "Cove" is from the English language and its Latin roots meant cave or hut that later implied an enclosed dwelling or safe harbor. The nearby land was named later with the Damariscove in mind. At the time of the earliest British exploration, many desired the territory of Maine be named "New Ireland." Higher authority was not so inclined but the map makers found ways to imply Ireland to place names. The word "Gaels," that meant Ireland in English but in Latin 'scota' had been used by the Old Romans. Addition of a second letter "t" to this Latin root ensured pronunciation would not be confused with Scotia, already in use (Nova Scotia, or New Scotland.) Hence, the English meaning of the word Damarisscotta was "Gentle-Ireland" which without consideration of the industrial scale oyster middens found along the shores of Damariscove, makes little sense. Captain Martin Pring, a renowned, life-long British mariner explored and mapped this part of the Maine coast. Investor Sir Ferdinand Gorges assisted with his map production. Captain Pring would have noticed signs of oyster harvesting. At the time, Royal Land Patents reserved pearls, gold, silver and other valuable minerals for the Crown and often the Crown paid discoverers and especially investors handsomely for their finds. Gorge was so impressed with Pring's oyster midden discovery he funded additional exploration and soon invested with Mason to secure large land patent in 1622 that included Maine. After New Hampshire was divided off, Gorges secured sole ownership of a second Patent for Maine and pinpointed the location for a fort at nearby Bristol, perhaps, located to protect their Damariscove. Out of Maine patent was carved the Pemaquid Patent in 1631, assigned Robert Aldworth and Gyles Elbridge who married Mary (Aldworth) Hooke, widow of William Hooke, in 1639. Specifically, the Pemaquid Patent extended to and included all of Damariscove. Push to name the Territory of Maine, "New Ireland has founding in Ireland's history where pearl fishing was a widespread activity and explains the use of "scota" or "scotta," so meaning Gaels, that was incorporated into the Damariscotta town name. Throughout Ireland, pearls were found in rivers going back to when ancient Irish traded pearls as far away as with Phoenicians from whom they traded pearls for secrets to produce purple dye. Discovery of Damariscove oyster shell middens or potential evidence of a pearl harvesting operation, was a very lucrative find and so valuable, that ruffian seafarers may have celebrated and professed themselves believers all over again, like Damaris was in the Bible. Sovereigns involved in map naming may have had similar sentiment. Early maps not only bore the Royal Seal, but credited a sovereign for naming "the more important features" on the map. While the sovereigns consulted mariner logs, it is unlikely the ship had ever consulted local populations to gain names while navigating the Maine coast for many reasons, but above all, due to the language barrier.

The main village is located at the lower falls and head of navigation on the Damariscotta River. Early industries included two sawmills, a match factory and a tannery. Along the river were established several brickyards, which supplied much of the brick used to build Boston's Back Bay neighborhood. Shipbuilding in particular brought Damariscotta wealth in the 1800s, when clipper ships were launched at the town's shipyards. During that time, many fine examples of Federal, Greek Revival and Italianate style architecture were erected, giving the old seaport a considerable charm which each summer attracts throngs of tourists. Damariscotta is home of the Skidompha Public Library, whose name is an acronym formed from the first letter of several founders' surnames.

The terminus of the Damariscotta River is the Great Salt Bay, a mating area for horseshoe crabs in North America, and the state's first marine protected area. The river is home to 80% of the farmed oysters produced in Maine.

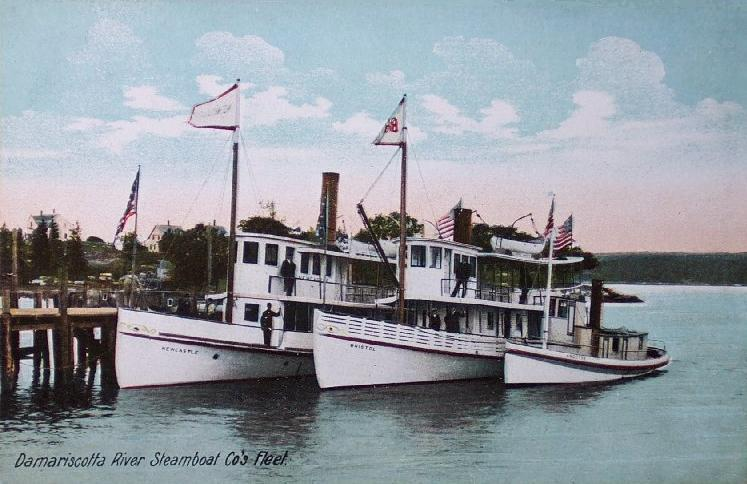
Steamboat fleet in 1906

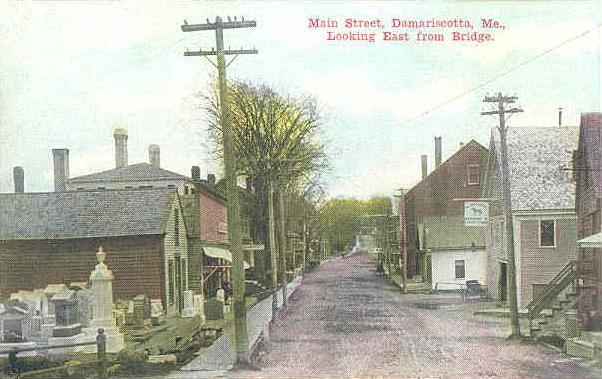
Main Street in 1910

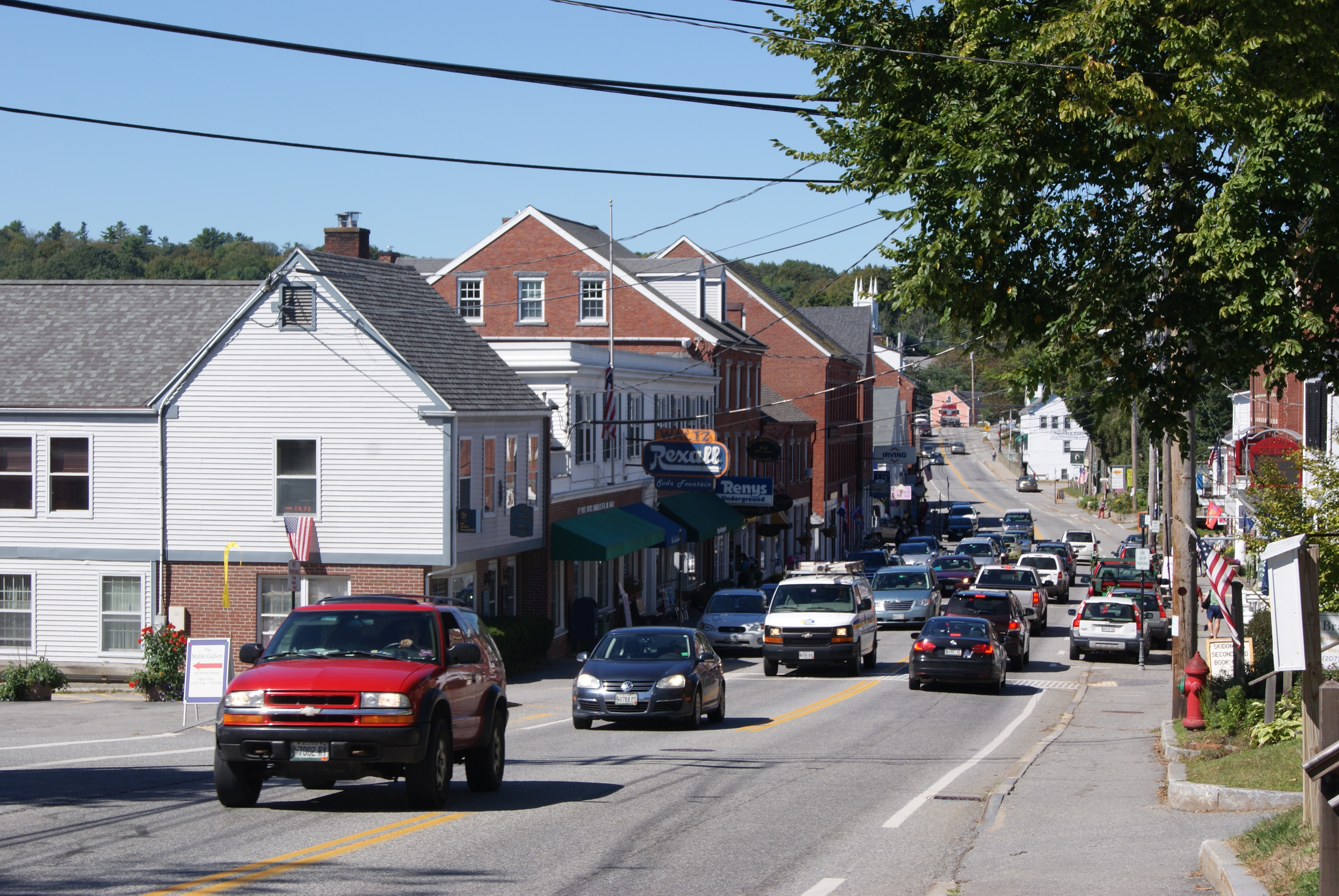
Main Street, 2013

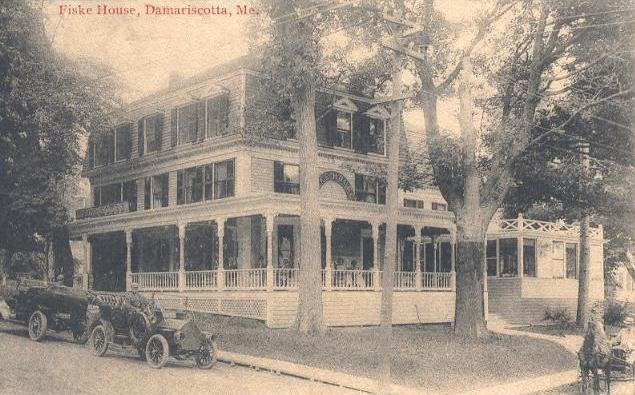
The Fiske House in 1914

== Geography ==
According to the United States Census Bureau, the town has a total area of 14.71 square miles (38.10 km^{2}), of which 12.42 square miles (32.17 km^{2}) is land and 2.29 square miles (5.93 km^{2}) is water. Damariscotta is situated on the Damariscotta River, a tidal estuary of the Gulf of Maine. Hunt Hill, at an elevation of 350 feet (108 m) above sea level, is the town's highest point.

== Demographics ==
Historical population
Census	Pop.	Note	%±
1850	1,328		—
1860	1,366		2.9%
1870	1,232		−9.8%
1880	1,142		−7.3%
1890	1,012		−11.4%
1900	876		−13.4%
1910	771		−12.0%
1920	849		10.1%
1930	825		−2.8%
1940	844		2.3%
1950	1,113		31.9%
1960	1,093		−1.8%
1970	1,264		15.6%
1980	1,493		18.1%
1990	1,811		21.3%
2000	2,041		12.7%
2010	2,218		8.7%
2020	2,297		3.6%
U.S. Decennial Census

=== 2010 census ===
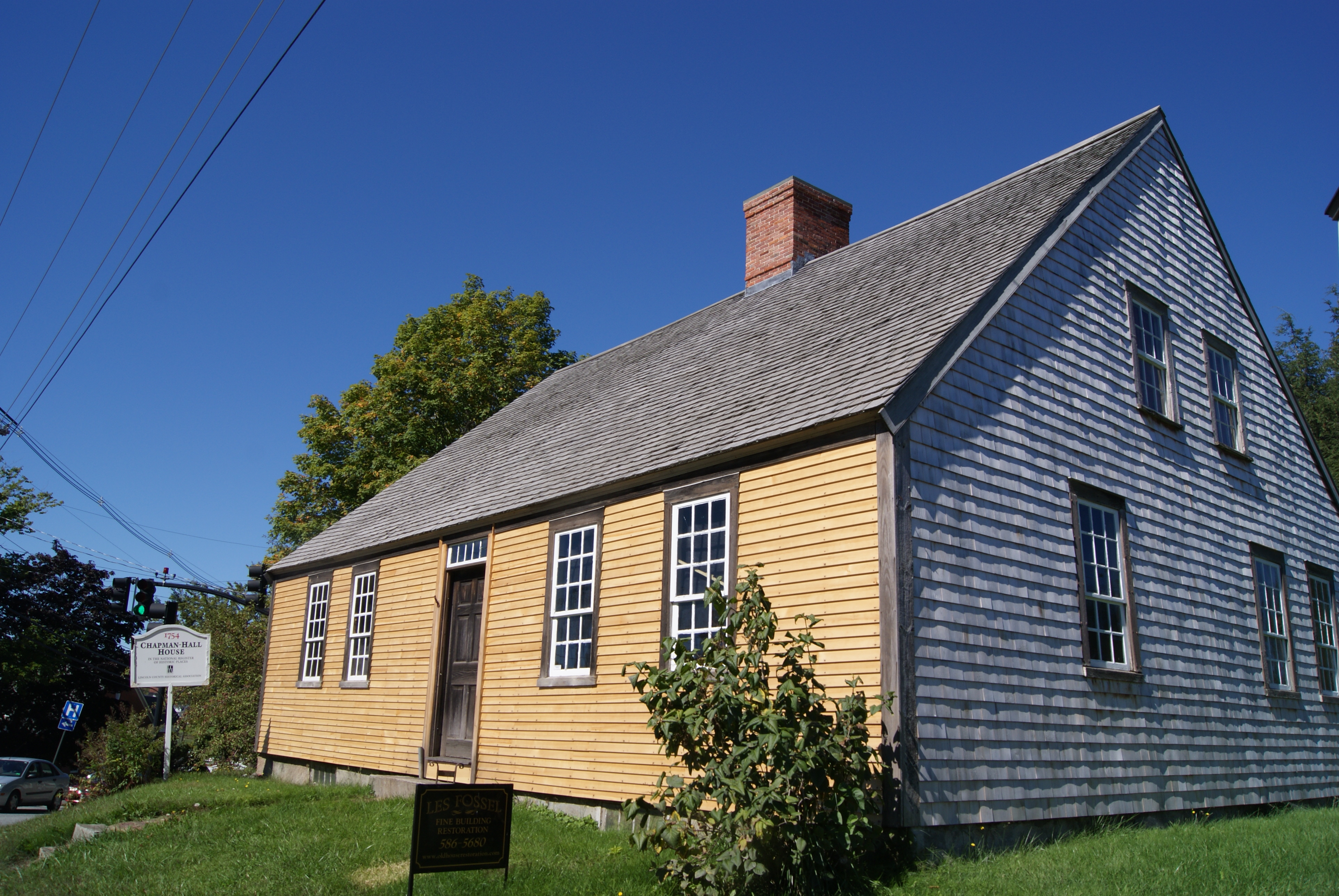
Chapman-Hall House at 270 Main Street. Built in 1754, it is the oldest building in Damariscotta and one of the oldest in Maine. It was entered into the National Register of Historic Places in 1970.

As of the census of 2010, there were 2,218 people, 1,051 households, and 578 families residing in the town. The population density was 178.6 inhabitants per square mile (69.0/km^{2}). There were 1,359 housing units at an average density of 109.4 per square mile (42.2/km^{2}). The racial makeup of the town was 97.0% White, 0.4% African American, 0.8% Asian, 0.3% from other races, and 1.4% from two or more races. Hispanic or Latino of any race were 0.6% of the population.

There were 1,051 households, of which 22.6% had children under the age of 18 living with them, 41.8% were married couples living together, 10.4% had a female householder with no husband present, 2.9% had a male householder with no wife present, and 45.0% were non-families. 39.7% of all households were made up of individuals, and 20.7% had someone living alone who was 65 years of age or older. The average household size was 2.03 and the average family size was 2.66.

The median age in the town was 50.7 years. 18.2% of residents were under the age of 18; 6.5% were between the ages of 18 and 24; 17.7% were from 25 to 44; 27.8% were from 45 to 64; and 29.8% were 65 years of age or older. The gender makeup of the town was 44.2% male and 55.8% female.

=== 2000 census ===
As of the census of 2000, there were 2,041 people, 942 households, and 548 families residing in the town. The population density was 164.4 inhabitants per square mile (63.5/km^{2}). There were 1,151 housing units at an average density of 92.7 per square mile (35.8/km^{2}). The racial makeup of the town was 98.92% White, 0.20% African American, 0.20% Native American, 0.24% Asian, 0.05% from other races, and 0.39% from two or more races. Hispanic or Latino of any race were 0.49% of the population.

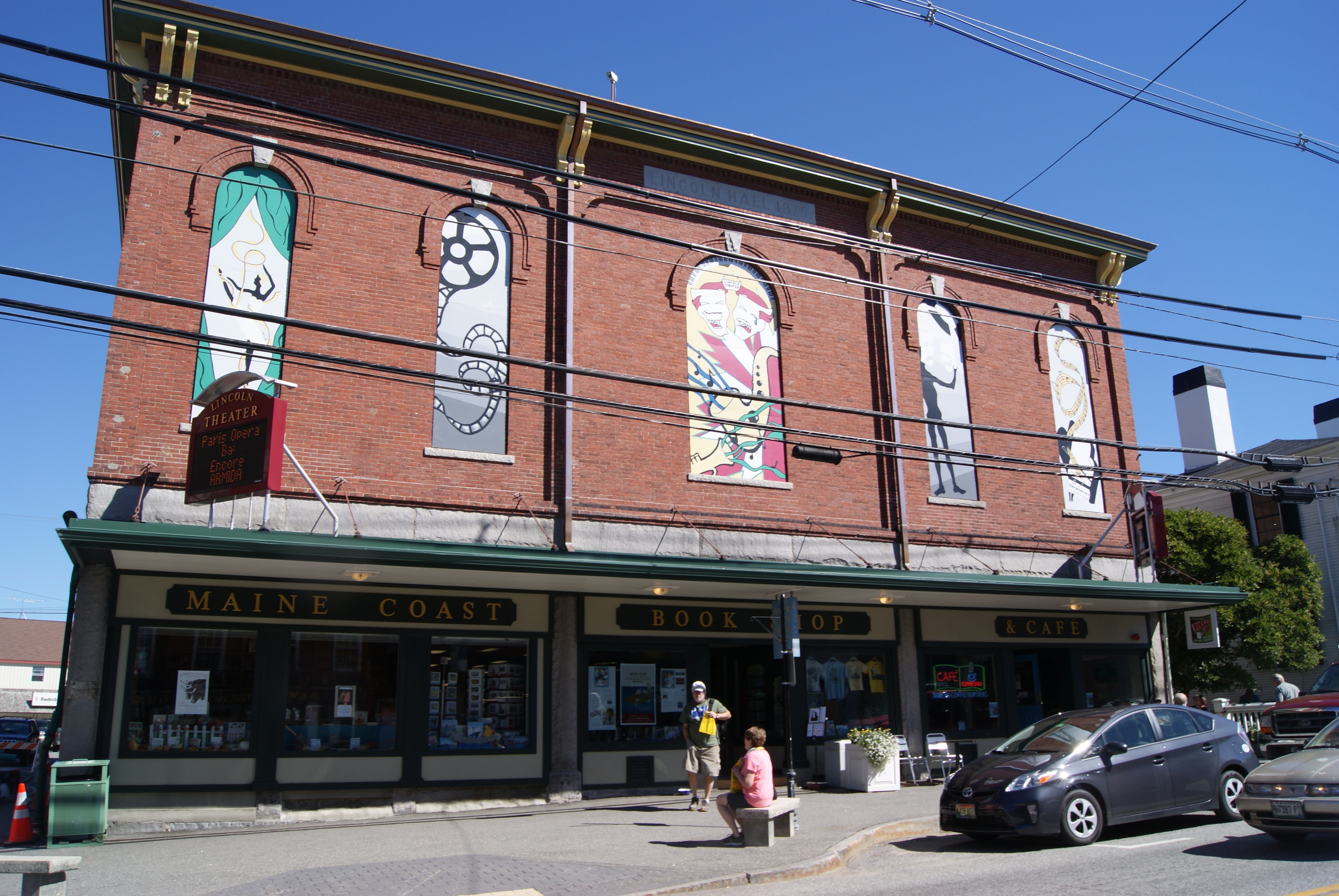
Lincoln Theater (upper level) and the Maine Coast Bookshop at 158 Main Street, Damariscotta

There were 942 households, out of which 23.5% had children under the age of 18 living with them, 46.4% were married couples living together, 7.9% had a female householder with no husband present, and 41.8% were non-families. 36.6% of all households were made up of individuals, and 19.9% had someone living alone who was 65 years of age or older. The average household size was 2.06 and the average family size was 2.65.

In the town, the population was spread out, with 19.6% under the age of 18, 5.2% from 18 to 24, 21.3% from 25 to 44, 23.4% from 45 to 64, and 30.5% who were 65 years of age or older. The median age was 48 years. For every 100 females, there were 83.0 males. For every 100 females age 18 and over, there were 76.0 males.

The median income for a household in the town was $36,188, and the median income for a family was $47,105. Males had a median income of $31,953 versus $23,064 for females. The per capita income for the town was $23,146. About 6.7% of families and 11.7% of the population were below the poverty line, including 16.4% of those under age 18 and 5.7% of those age 65 or over.

== Education ==
The elementary school district is the Great Salt Bay Community School District, while the municipality would be its own school district at the secondary level. Great Salt Bay Community School, a K-8 school, is in Damariscotta.

Damariscotta was a part of the Central Lincoln County School System a.k.a. Maine Alternative Organizational Structure (AOS) #93. Steven Bailey is the Superintendent of Schools. On July 21, 2025, Damariscotta left AOS 93. It formed a regional school unit with Bremen and Newcastle.

== Notable people ==
- Kate Aldrich, mezzo-soprano
- Anna Belknap, actress
- Bud Blake, cartoonist
- Charles A. Boutelle, U.S. representative from Maine
- Glenn Chadbourne, illustrator
- Gene G. Chandler, speaker of the New Hampshire House of Representatives
- Barbara Cooney, children's author and illustrator
- Bill Caldwell, book author
- Jessica Delfino, singer and songwriter, stand-up comic
- Ezra B. French, U.S. representative from Maine
- Ryan Gaul, actor known for his role in The Last O.G.
- Robert Gerringer, actor
- Hilton Kramer, art critic
- Frank Springer, cartoonist and comic book illustrator
- Betty Twarog, biochemist
