= Andrew Jones =

Andrew Jones may refer to:

== Politicians ==
- Andrew Jones (Australian politician) (1944–2015), Australian politician
- Andrew Jones (British politician) (born 1963), British politician
- Andrew Jones (fl. 1386), MP for Cricklade
- Andrew Jones (American politician), Republican member of the Alabama Senate

== Sports ==
=== Cricket ===
- Andrew Jones (cricket administrator) (born 1972), current CEO of Cricket NSW
- Andrew Jones (Australian cricketer) (born 1964), Australian cricketer
- Andrew Jones (New Zealand cricketer) (Andrew Howard Jones, born 1959), New Zealand test cricketer, played for Central Districts Stags, Otago Volts and Wellington Firebirds
- Andrew Jones (Welsh cricketer) (Andrew James Jones, born 1972), former Welsh cricketer, played for Wales Minor Counties
- Andrew Jones (Staffordshire cricketer) (Andrew James Jones, born 1977), former English cricketer, played for Staffordshire
- Andrew Jones (Somerset cricketer) (Andrew Paul Jones, born 1964), former English cricketer, played for Somerset

=== Other sports ===
- Andrew Jones (American football) (born 1952), American football player
- Andrew Jones (basketball) (born 1997), American basketball player
- Andrew Jones (Canadian football) (born 1982), Canadian football player
- Andrew Jones (racing driver) (born 1980), Australian racing driver
- Andi Jones (born 1978), English athlete

== Others ==
- Andrew Lee Jones (1955–1991), American executed for murder
- Andrew Jones (artist), American visual artist
- Andrew Jones (bodybuilder) (born 1990), American bodybuilder
- Andrew Jones (Medal of Honor) (1835–?), American Civil War sailor and Medal of Honor recipient
- Andrew Jones (historian) (born 1944), British historian
- Andrew Jones (filmmaker) (1983–2023), British screenwriter and director
- Andrew F. Jones, (born 1969), American sinologist
- Andrew R. Jones, visual effects artist, winner of the Academy Award for Best Visual Effects for Avatar
- Andrew "Jr. Boy" Jones (born 1948), American blues guitarist
- Andrew Jones (priest) (born 1961), Church in Wales priest

== See also ==
- Andruw Jones (born 1977), Curaçaon former baseball player
- Druw Jones (born 2003), American baseball player
- Andy Jones (disambiguation)
