= 1878 United States House of Representatives elections in Maine =

- September 9, 1878

5 for the House of Representatives

	Majority party	Minority party
Party	Republican	Greenback
Seats won	3	2
Popular vote	59,293	47,445
Percentage	45.22	39.12

The 1878 United States House of Representatives election in Maine was held on September 9, 1878, to elect representatives from the state of Maine. Maine's five representatives in the House were apportioned according to the 1870 census. Representatives served in the 46th Congress from March 4, 1879, to March 4, 1881. Elections were held in midterms, coinciding with the state's gubernatorial elections.

== General results ==
The total results of each party in the 5 districts.

Election
Party	Candidate	Votes
Republican	Thomas B. Reed	13,483
Democratic	Thomas J. Anderson	9,333
Greenback	Edward H. Gove	6348
Majority		29,164

=== District summary ===
District	Incumbent	Party	Elected	Party
1st	Thomas B. Reed	Republican	Thomas B. Reed	Republican
2nd	William P. Frye	Republican	William P. Frye	Republican
3rd	Stephen Lindsey	Republican	Stephen Lindsey	Republican
4th	Llewellyn Powers	Republican	George W. Ladd	Greenback
5th	Eugene Hale	Republican	Thompson H. Murch	Greenback

== 1st district ==
Incumbent Thomas B. Reed won re-election against all other candidates.

Election
Party	Candidate	Votes
Republican	Stephen Lindsay	11,373
Greenback	William Philbrick	8,351
Democratic	Franklin Smith	5,895
Majority		25,619

== 2nd district ==
Incumbent William P. Frye won re-election against all other candidates.

Election
Party	Votes	%
Greenback	20,737	38.12
Republican	56,293	45.22
Democratic	56,293	16.66
Majority	124,475	—

== 3rd district ==
Incumbent Stephen Lindsey won re-election against all other candidates.

1878 United States House of Representatives elections in Maine
- September 9, 1878

	Majority party	Minority party
Party	Republican	Greenback
Seats before	5	0
Seats after	3	2
Popular vote	56293	47445
Percentage	45.22	38.12

== 4th district ==
Incumbent Llewellyn Powers of the Republican Party lost re-election to George W. Ladd of the Greenback Party.

Candidate	Party	Votes	Percentage
George W. Ladd	Greenback	12,921	56.14%
Llewellyn Powers (Incumbent)	Republican	10,095	43.86%
Total votes		23,016	100%

== 5th district ==
Incumbent Eugene Hale of the Republican Party lost re-election to Thompson H. Murch of the Greenback Party.

Candidate	Party	Votes	Percentage
Thompson H. Murch	Greenback	11,353	56.14%
Eugene Hale (Incumbent)	Republican	9911	42.28%
Joseph H. Martin	Democrat	2177	9.29%
Total votes		23,441	100%
