= Gary Plummer =

Gary Plummer may refer to:

- Gary Plummer (basketball), Israeli-American basketball player
- Gary Plummer (American football), American football player
- Gary Plummer (politician), Maine State Senator
