= Charles A. Boutelle =

American politician (1839–1901)

Charles Addison Boutelle
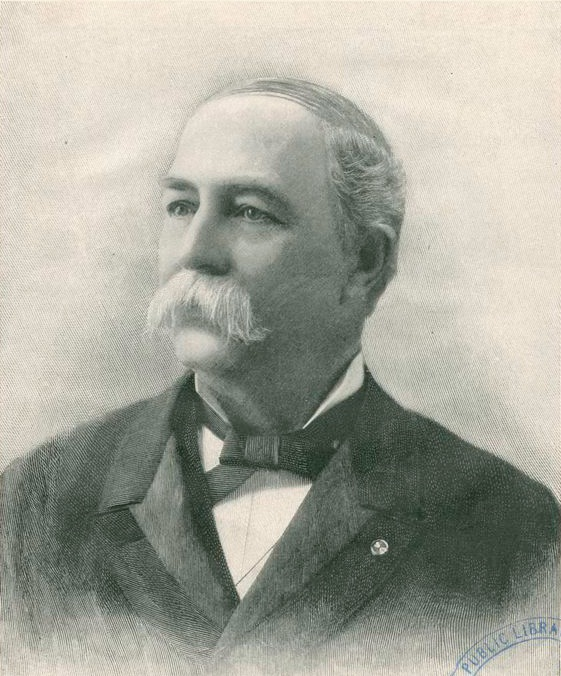

Member of the U.S. House of Representatives from Maine
- In office March 4, 1883 – March 3, 1901
- Preceded by: District created
- Succeeded by: Llewellyn Powers
- Constituency: At-large (1883–85); 4th district (1885–1901)

Personal details
- Born: February 9, 1839 Damariscotta, Maine
- Died: May 21, 1901 (aged 62) McLean Hospital, Belmont, Massachusetts
- Resting place: Mount Hope Cemetery, Bangor, Maine
- Citizenship: United States
- Party: Republican
- Spouse: Elizabeth Hodsdon
- Children: Grace Hodsdon Boutelle; Elizabeth Boutelle; Anne Curtis Boutelle
- Occupation: Shipmaster; Naval officer Newspaper editor Publisher
- Committees: House Naval Affairs Committee

Military service
- Allegiance: United States
- Branch/service: United States Navy
- Years of service: 1862–1866
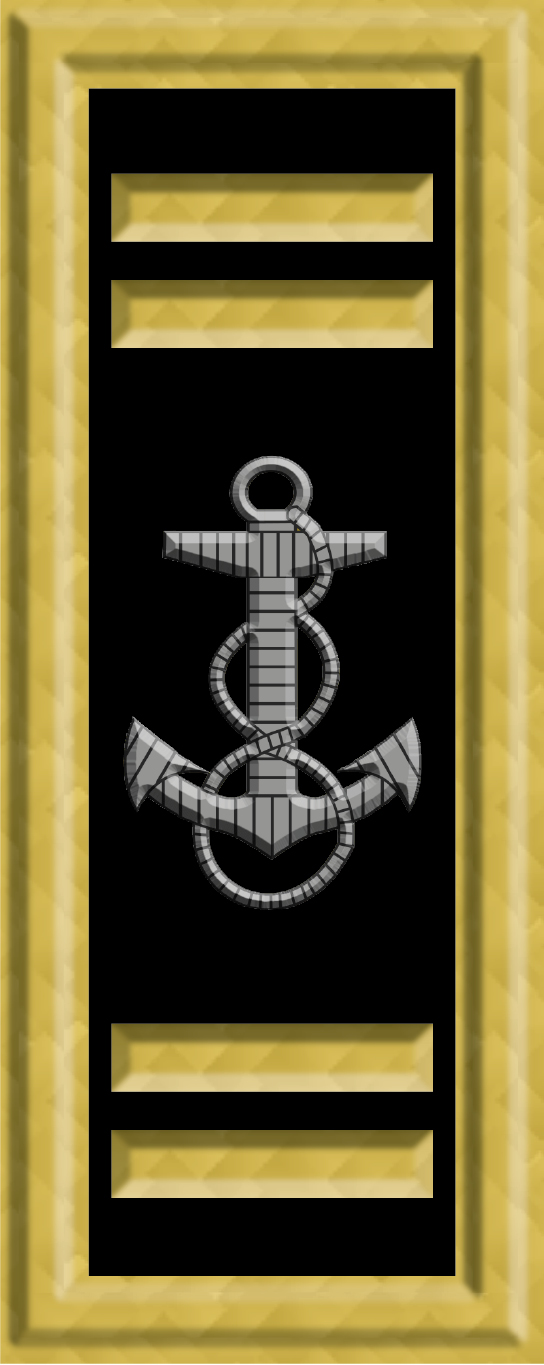
- Rank: Volunteer Lieutenant
- Commands: USS Nyanza
- Battles/wars: American Civil War

Charles Addison Boutelle (February 9, 1839 – May 21, 1901) was an American seaman, shipmaster, naval officer, Civil War veteran, newspaper editor, publisher, conservative Republican politician, and nine-term Representative to the U.S. Congress from the 4th Congressional District of Maine. He remains the second longest-serving U.S. Representative from Maine, the first being his colleague Thomas Brackett Reed.

== Early life ==
Boutelle was born to Charles and Lucy A. (Curtis) Boutelle in Damariscotta, Lincoln County, Maine. In 1848 his family moved from Damariscotta to Brunswick, Maine. He attended the public schools of Brunswick and later attended the Yarmouth Academy in 1850 and 1851.

== Naval career ==
His father was a shipmaster, and Charles himself went to sea at the age of fifteen. He spent the next eleven years as a sailor, becoming a shipmaster in his own right in 1860. Returning from a two-year voyage in 1862 to find the country at war, he volunteered his services to the Union Navy and was commissioned an Acting Master on April 5, 1862.

He served on the Paul Jones, a double-ended, sidewheel, steam gunboat assigned to the South Atlantic Blockading Squadron. During this assignment, the shallow-draft vessel was engaged in intelligence-gathering, patrolling the river outlets, and guarding against Confederate river traffic attempting to run the blockade of the Georgia coastline.

His next assignment was aboard Sassacus, another double-ended, steam gunboat engaged in the blockades of Charleston and Wilmington. On May 5, 1864, while assigned to that vessel, his ship, along with other Union vessels, saw action against the Confederate ironclad CSS Albemarle. During that engagement, Sassacus rammed the Albemarle as it attempted to escape. Sassacus took a direct hit to the starboard boiler and sustained significant damage when the boiler exploded. It was during that battle that Boutelle was cited “for gallant conduct,” resulting in his promotion to the rank of Volunteer Lieutenant, the highest rank granted volunteer officers not of the regular navy.

Lieutenant Boutelle was subsequently given command of the Nyanza, another of the shallow-draft and lightly armored steam vessels known as 'tinclads'. During his command, Nyanza participated, under Admiral David Farragut, in the Battle of Mobile Bay, on August 5, 1864, where Lieutenant Boutelle was credited with receiving the surrender of the Confederate fleet. Following the victory at Mobile, Boutelle was placed in command of Union naval forces in the Mississippi Sound.

Lieutenant Boutelle continued in naval service until the conclusion of the war when he voluntarily separated from service. He was granted an honorable discharge on January 14, 1866. Later, he was elected as a companion of the Maine Commandery of the Military Order of the Loyal Legion of the United States.

Soon after his departure from naval service, he married Elizabeth ("Lizzie") Hodsdon, daughter of attorney and Maine Adjutant General, John L. Hodsdon, on May 16, 1866, in Augusta, the bride's home town. Together they had three daughters, Grace Hodsdon Boutelle, Elizabeth Boutelle, and Anne ("Annie") Curtis Boutelle. In 1890 Anne Boutelle sponsored the protected cruiser Newark, the US Navy's first modern cruiser.

== Newspaper editor and publisher ==
Following the war, Boutelle became the master of a steamer running between New York and Wilmington. He was associated briefly with a New York commission house, but, in 1870, he was recommended for the position of Editor-in-Chief of the Bangor Daily Whig and Courier, a Republican newspaper. He took that position and moved his young family to Bangor in their home state of Maine, where they lived for the rest of his life.

Boutelle was a dynamic editor, and, under his leadership, the paper became one of the most influential in the northeastern United States. Upon the death of the owner, J. H. Lynde, Boutelle, along with a partner, B. A. Burr, purchased the Daily Whig and Courier on May 15, 1874. He continued active editorial control until failing health and growing competition finally forced him to sell the paper in March, 1900.

== Political career ==
Boutelle's robustly-conservative Republican editorial positions drew him further into both state and national politics. He was selected as a district delegate to the Republican National Convention at Cincinnati in 1876, and served as the president of the Maine (James G.) Blaine Club at the national convention of 1880. Gaining further prominence in the state Republican party, he was selected as the representative from Maine on the Republican National Committee at the national convention of 1884 that nominated James G. Blaine. He was both a delegate-at-large and chairman of the Maine delegation at the Republican national convention of 1888, during which he read to the convention the cablegram from Blaine refusing to be nominated. He was a member of the Maine Republican State Committee from 1875 to 1882.

=== U.S. Representative ===
An obvious choice for U.S. Congress, he first stood as the Republican candidate for the 4th Maine Congressional District (comprising Aroostook, Penobscot, Piscataquis and Washington counties) on June 24, 1880, but was narrowly defeated (by 855 votes) by the incumbent, Dr. George W. Ladd of the Greenback Party. He was elected Maine representative-at-large to the 48th Congress by a substantial majority in the 1882 election, and he was subsequently elected 4th District Representative in every election after that, until his resignation in 1901.

Congressman Boutelle drew on his maritime background, serving as the Chairman of the House Naval Affairs Committee in the 51st, 54th, 55th, and 56th Congresses. During his tenure in that position, he provided powerful leadership in modernizing the navy and was instrumental in the development of the first steel battleships, along with the industries that supported their construction and outfitting. The growth of the Bath Iron Works can be partly attributed to his leadership position.

No less charismatic a speaker than he was a writer, Congressman Boutelle was relentless in his support of Republican positions in the great debates of his time. He is especially remembered for speeches on the question of Hawaiian annexation (53rd Congress) and the border dispute between Great Britain and Venezuela (54th Congress); these were the two great foreign policy issues of the second Democratic administration of President Grover Cleveland (1892–1896).

In April 1898, Boutelle was among the six representatives who voted against declaring war on Spain.

== Illness and death ==
Boutelle was at the peak of his political popularity when, on December 21, 1899, he suffered an apparent seizure during a stay in a Boston hotel; the seizure left him unconscious. He was treated briefly at his home in Bangor, but he was soon moved to the McLean Asylum in the Waverley section of Belmont, Massachusetts. Under the care of the superintendent, Dr. Edward Cowles, he was diagnosed with "brain trouble" arising from the seizure, as well as underlying renal and cardiac disease.

Although he made slow progress toward recovery, he never again fully regained his faculties and remained hospitalized for the rest of his life. Despite this, however, the loyalty he commanded from the voters of his district, as well as the state party chiefs, was so great that he was again nominated, and elected, to the 57th Congress.

In addition to his poor health, his last years were plagued with financial troubles. In response to his situation, as well as in tribute to his long service to the nation, the Maine Republican delegation led a joint resolution of Congress January 16, 1901, naming him to the Naval Retired List with the rank of captain, entitling him to half-pay at that rank for life. He resigned from Congress on March 3, 1901, prior to the commencement of the 57th Congress.

Suffering from a sudden case of pneumonia while hospitalized in Massachusetts, Charles Addison Boutelle died on May 21, 1901, and was interred in Mount Hope Cemetery, Bangor, Maine.

"Boutelle Road", a street in the Fairmount Park neighborhood of Bangor, memorializes the Congressman.

U.S. House of Representatives
| Preceded by N/A | Member of the U.S. House of Representatives from Maine's at-large congressional district March 4, 1883 – March 3, 1885 | Succeeded by N/A |
| Preceded by George Washington Ladd | Member of the U.S. House of Representatives from Maine's 4th congressional district March 4, 1885 – March 3, 1901 | Succeeded by Llewellyn Powers |
