= Maine's 26th State Senate district =

American legislative district

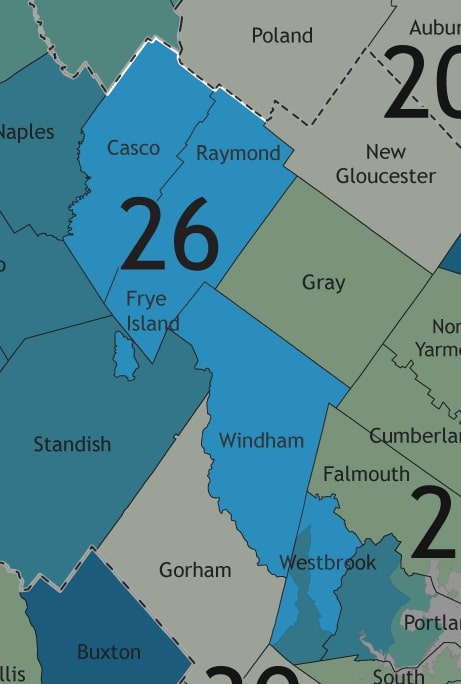
Senator
| Tim Nangle; D–Windham |
- Population (2020): 39,096

Maine's 26th State Senate district is one of 35 districts in the Maine Senate. It has been represented by Democrat Tim Nangle since 2022

== Geography ==
District 26 representsa small part of Cumberland County, including part of the city of Westbrook.

Cumberland County - 12.9% of county

Cumberland:

City:

- (Part of) Westbrook

Towns:

- Casco
- Frye Island
- Raymond
- Windham

== Recent election results ==
=== 2022 ===
2022 Maine State Senate election, District 26
| Party | Candidate | Votes | % |
|---|---|---|---|
| Democratic | Tim Nangle | 9,734 | 50.9 |
| Republican | Gary Plummer | 7,388 | 49.1 |
| Total votes | | 19,112 | 100.0 |
| Democratic hold | | | |

Elections prior to 2022 were held under different district lines.

=== 2024 ===
2024 Maine State Senate election, District 26
| Party | Candidate | Votes | % |
|---|---|---|---|
| Democratic | Tim Nangle | 12,124 | 52 |
| Republican | Kenneth Cianchatte | 11,177 | 48 |
| Total votes | | 23,301 | 100.0 |
| Democratic hold | | | |

== Historical election results ==
=== 2012 ===
2012 Maine State Senate election, District 26
| Party | Candidate | Votes | % |
|---|---|---|---|
| Republican | Rodney Whittemore | 9,756 | 58.7 |
| Democratic | David Schwanke | 6,869 | 41.3 |
| Total votes | | 16,625 | 100 |
| Republican hold | | | |

=== 2014 ===
2014 Maine State Senate election, District 26
| Party | Candidate | Votes | % |
|---|---|---|---|
| Democratic | Bill Diamond | 10,389 | 60.7 |
| Republican | Kalie Warren | 6,078 | 35.6 |
| Blank votes | None | 643 | 3.8 |
| Total votes | | 17,119 | 100 |
| Democratic gain from Republican | | | |

=== 2016 ===
2016 Maine State Senate election, District 26
| Party | Candidate | Votes | % |
|---|---|---|---|
| Democratic | Bill Diamond | 13,081 | 62 |
| Republican | Ryan McDonald | 8,026 | 38 |
| Total votes | | 21,107 | 100 |
| Democratic hold | | | |

=== 2018 ===
2018 Maine State Senate election, District 26
| Party | Candidate | Votes | % |
|---|---|---|---|
| Democratic | Bill Diamond | 14,743 | 80.5 |
| Write-in | | 3,574 | 19.5 |
| Total votes | | 18,317 | 100 |
| Democratic hold | | | |

=== 2020 ===
2020 Maine State Senate election, District 26
| Party | Candidate | Votes | % |
|---|---|---|---|
| Democratic | Bill Diamond | 14,267 | 60.7 |
| Republican | Karen Lockwood | 9,219 | 39.3 |
| Total votes | | 23,486 | 100 |
| Democratic hold | | | |
