= Frank Ball =

Frank Ball may refer to:

- Frank Clayton Ball (1857–1943), American industrialist and philanthropist
- SS Frank C. Ball, an American bulk carrier
- Frank Ball (golfer) (c. 1892–?), English golfer
- Frank Livingston Ball (1885–1966), member of the Virginia Senate
- Frank Thornton Ball (1921–2013), English actor, better known as Frank Thornton
- Frank W. Ball (1880–1934), American lawyer and government official in Maine
