= Joseph T. Edgar =

American politician

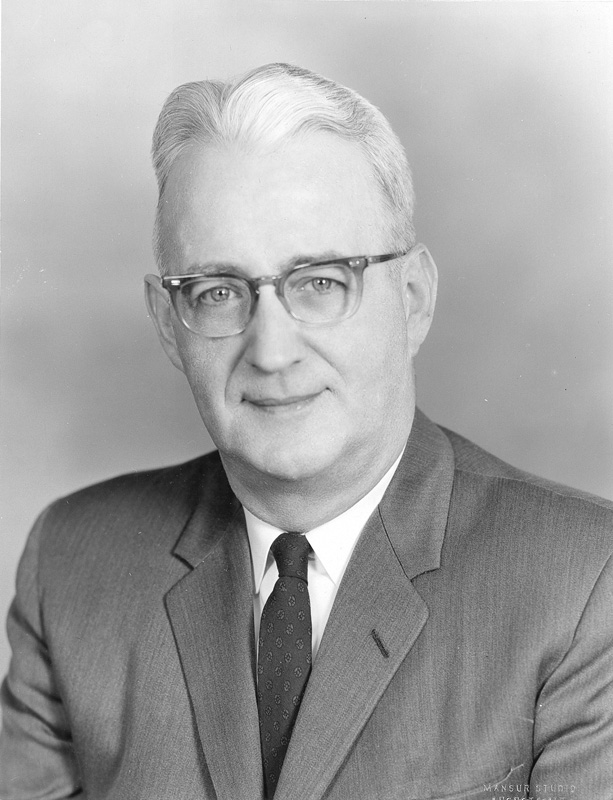

42nd Secretary of State of Maine
- In office 1967–1975
- Governor: Kenneth M. Curtis
- Preceded by: Kenneth M. Curtis
- Succeeded by: Markham L. Gartley

Member of the Maine Senate from the Hancock County district
- In office January 4, 1961 – June 28, 1961 Serving with Dwight A. Brown
- Preceded by: Frank A. Pierce
- Succeeded by: John B. Ellis

Speaker of the Maine House of Representatives
- In office January 2, 1957 – January 4, 1961
- Preceded by: Willis A. Trafton Jr.
- Succeeded by: Vinal G. Good

Member of the Maine House of Representatives from the Bar Harbor, Trenton, and Hancock district
- In office January 5, 1955 – January 4, 1961
- Preceded by: David A. Peterson
- Succeeded by: Edwin R. Smith

Personal details
- Born: Joseph Tappen Edgar; April 1, 1910 Jersey City, New Jersey, U.S.
- Died: November 27, 1990 (aged 80) Bar Harbor, Maine, U.S.
- Party: Republican
- Spouse: Margaret Sanford (m. 1934)
- Education: Princeton University

Joseph Tappen Edgar (April 1, 1910 – November 27, 1990) was an American politician from Maine. Edgar, a Republican from Bar Harbor, was first elected to the Maine House of Representatives in 1954.

After serving his first term outside leadership Edgar was elected Speaker of the Maine House of Representatives. He served two terms as Speaker before leaving leadership. Re-elected in 1960, Edgar resigned in June 1961 and was replaced by John B. Ellis. In 1967, he was elected by the Maine Legislature as Secretary of State. He retired from that office in 1974 and was replaced by Democrat Markham L. Gartley.

Political offices
Preceded by Kenneth M. Curtis	Secretary of State of Maine; 1967–1975	Succeeded by Markham L. Gartley
