= Litchfield Academy =

Former college preparatory school in Litchfield, Maine, U.S.

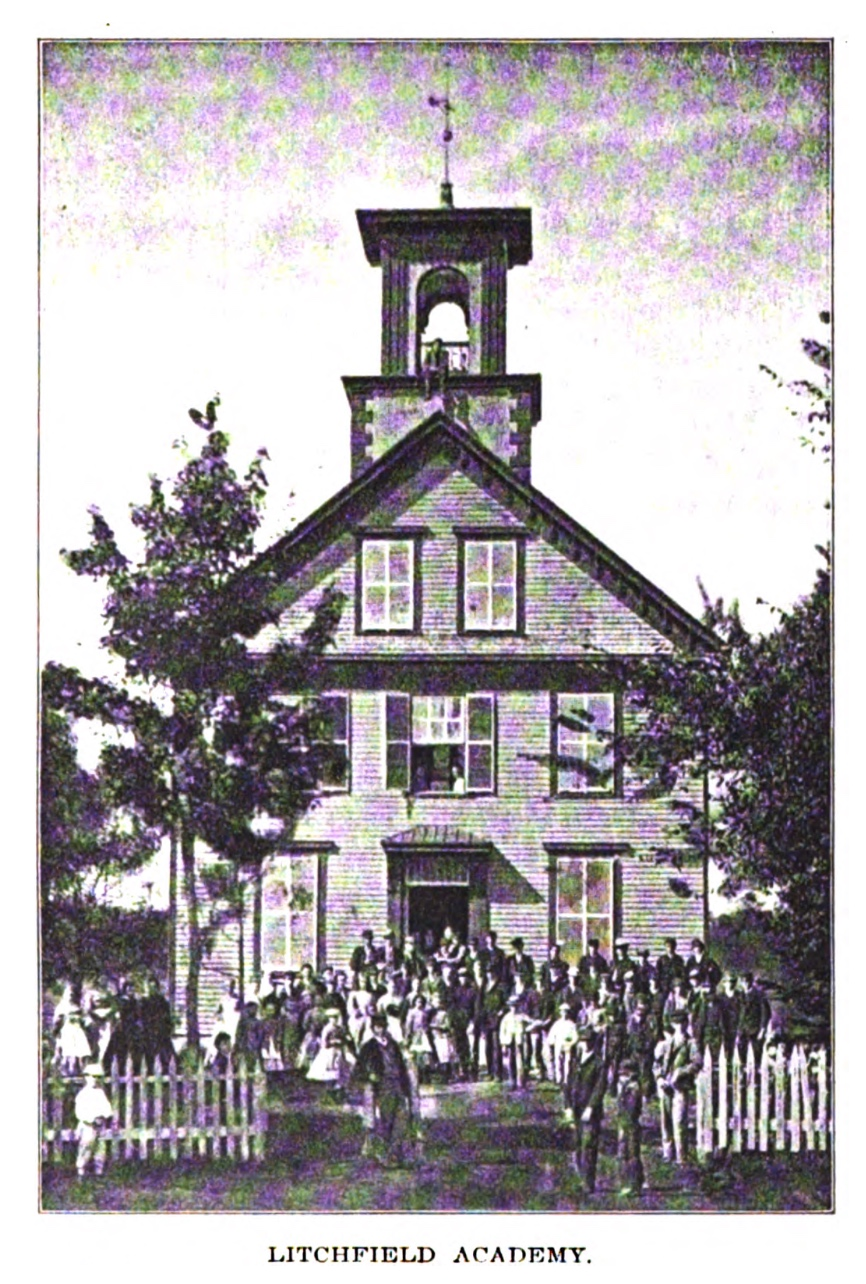
- Litchfield Academy photographed for History of Litchfield and an account of its centennial celebrations, 1895

Location
- 466 Academy Road; Litchfield Corner; Litchfield, Maine 04350; United States
- Coordinates: 44°7′55″N 69°57′56″W

Information
- Type: High school
- Established: 1845
- Closed: 1988

Litchfield Academy is an historic school building in the town of Litchfield, Maine. The school was incorporated in 1845 and built in 1852 in the Litchfield Corner neighborhood. The school closed in 1988 and, since 2004, it has served as the town's Senior Center.

== History ==
Before the academy building was constructed, an earlier high school operated in Litchfield Corner. In 1845, the high school was incorporated as Litchfield Academy. Tuition was $3 for the 12-week term.

In 1849, the Maine State Legislature granted the trustees of Litchfield Academy one-half of township No. 13 in Aroostook County. The sale of the land netted $5,650 to support the construction of a new school building. In 1852, a building measuring 33 feet by 40 feet by 20 feet was constructed "after the North Yarmouth plan" at Litchfield Corner.

In 1903, the town of Litchfield began offering free high school education to local students by paying for their tuition at Litchfield Academy. The academy's library had more than 1,000 titles in 1920.

According to the town report in 1923, the academy offered courses of study for college preparatory, scientific, commercial, and agricultural.

In 1926, students and supporters of the academy published The Litchfield Academy Cook Book.

The town purchased the building in 1954 and added two rooms in 1955.

In 1966, Litchfield Academy stopped offering high school classes. The town then paid for local high school students to attend Monmouth Academy. In 1971 a wing was added to Litchfield Academy and the school became known as the Libby-Tozier School, in honor of longtime teachers Elisie Libby and Irene Tozier. The Litchfield Academy portion of the new building continued to be called its original name.

The last students attended class in the academy in 1988. That same year an addition was constructed onto the 1971 wing that added a library, classrooms, offices, and a gymnasium. Afterwards the academy ceased being used for classes.

In 2004, the town established a Senior Center in the academy overseen by a seven-member Seniors Advisory Committee.

== Notable alumni ==
- John H. Hill, lawyer, educator, school administrator, and military officer
- Ormandel Smith, state legislator, Maine State Treasurer and Secretary of State of Maine

== See also ==
- Education in Maine
- Oak Hill High School
