= William Diamond =

American politician (1945–2025)

Bill Diamond
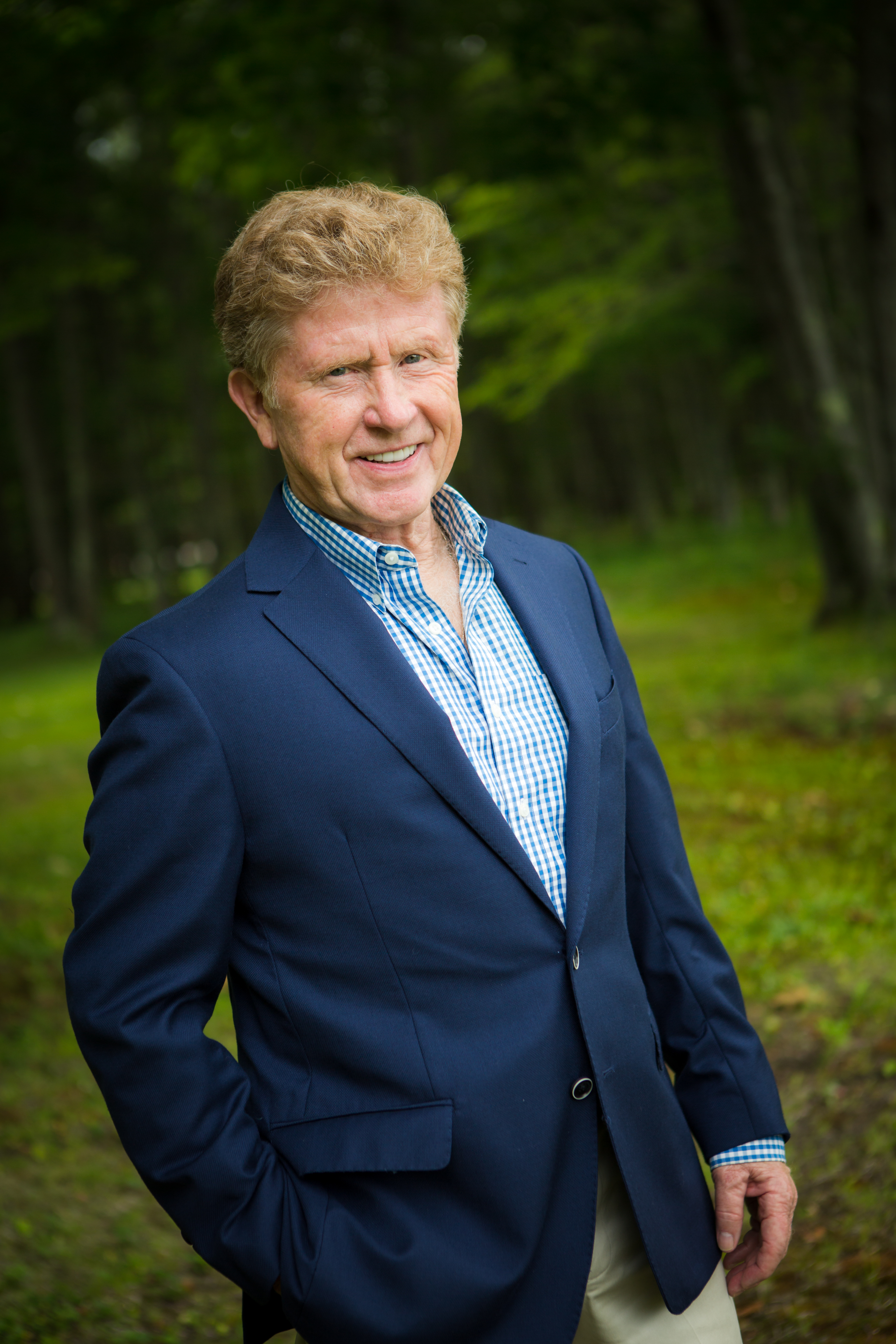

Member of the Maine Senate
- In office December 3, 2014 – December 7, 2022
- Preceded by: Gary Plummer
- Succeeded by: Tim Nangle
- Constituency: 26th district
- In office December 1, 2004 – December 5, 2012
- Succeeded by: Gary Plummer
- Constituency: 12th district
- In office December 1, 1982 – December 3, 1986
- Preceded by: David G. Huber
- Succeeded by: Robert G. Dillenback
- Constituency: 6th district (1982–1984); 27th district (1984–1986)

45th Secretary of State of Maine
- In office 1989–1996
- Governor: John R. McKernan Jr. Angus King
- Preceded by: Rodney S. Quinn
- Succeeded by: Dan Gwadosky

Member of the Maine House of Representatives from the 23rd district
- In office January 5, 1977 – December 1, 1982
- Preceded by: Thomas J. Peterson
- Succeeded by: Gary C. Cooper

Personal details
- Born: February 19, 1945 Gardiner, Maine, U.S.
- Died: August 31, 2025 (aged 80)
- Party: Democratic
- Spouse: Jane Diamond
- Education: University of Southern Maine, Gorham; University of New England

G. William Diamond (February 19, 1945 – August 31, 2025) was an American Democratic politician, educator, small business owner, legislator and onetime Maine Secretary of State. He served in the Maine Senate representing Senate District 26, which comprises the towns of Windham, Raymond, Standish, Casco, Baldwin, and Frye Island.

Diamond served in the Maine House of Representatives from 1977 to 1982, was the Maine Secretary of State from 1989 to 1997, and served in the Maine Senate from 1982 to 1986, from 2004 to 2012, and from 2014 to 2022. He was a teacher in the Windham and Raymond school systems for 18 years and was the superintendent and director of governmental relations for the controversial Élan School in Poland, Maine.

== Early life and education ==
Diamond was born in Gardiner, Maine in 1945. He received a bachelor's degree from Gorham State Teachers' College in 1968 and a master's degree in education administration from the same institution in 1972. He was a teacher and principal in the Windham and Raymond school system from 1968 to 1986, and was the superintendent of the Raymond school system in 1986. Diamond was a business owner from 1980 on.

Diamond also served as the superintendent and director of governmental relations at the Élan School in Poland, Maine, which closed in 2011 following an online campaign against the school over its alleged abuse and mistreatment of students.

== Political career ==
=== Maine House of Representatives ===
Diamond first ran for Maine House District 23 in 1976, winning the Democratic primary as a write-in candidate and defeating Republican Barbara Strout 51%–49% in the general election. He served two subsequent terms, running unopposed in Democratic primaries in both 1978 and 1980, defeating Republican Carole Bean in the 1978 general election and running unopposed in the 1980 general election.

=== Maine Senate ===
In 1982, Diamond defeated Republican David Huber 56%–44% in the general election to represent Maine Senate District 6. He won a second Senate term in 1984, beating Republican Kenneth Cole 61.5%–38.5%. He left office in 1986.

=== Secretary of State ===
Diamond was first elected Secretary of State by the 114th Maine House of Representatives on December 7, 1988. Diamond was nominated along with Stephen M. Zirnkilton and received 115 House votes to Zirnkilton's 62. Diamond's first two-year term as Secretary of State began in 1989 under Governor John R. McKernan Jr.

In 1993, Diamond faced criticism for his response to a ballot-tampering accusation directed toward an assistant to then-House Majority Leader John L. Martin. The incident is credited with contributing to the establishment of term limits for Maine legislators later in 1993.

Diamond entered the race for Maine's 1st congressional district in 1994 but lost the Democratic primary election. He remained Secretary of State until 1997 under Governor Angus King.

=== Maine Senate ===
Diamond again ran for the Senate District 12 seat in 2004. He ran unopposed in the Democratic primary and defeated Republican Joseph Bruno 55%–45% in the general election. He was re-elected in 2006, 2008, and 2010 before reaching his term limit.

In 2014, Diamond again sought the Senate District 26 seat, ran unopposed in the Democratic primary and defeated Republican Kaile Warren 63%–37% in the general election. He was re-elected in 2016, 2018, and 2020.

== Personal life and death ==
Diamond and his wife, Jane Diamond, lived in Windham. They had two daughters and eight grandchildren. In 2012, Diamond published The Evil and the Innocent, a compilation of true crime stories about perpetrators and victims of child sexual abuse.

Diamond was the co-founder and president of Windham Neighbors Helping Neighbors since 2007 and served on the board of directors for the Maine State Society for the Protection of Animals and for Hospice of Southern Maine. In 2023, he founded a child advocacy organization called Walk a Mile in Their Shoes, which has drawn attention to child abuse deaths and advocated for reforms.

Diamond died on August 31, 2025, at the age of 80.

== Electoral record ==
=== Maine House ===
1976 Maine House District 23 Democratic Primary
Party	Candidate	Votes	%
Democratic	G. William Diamond (write-in)	163	100%
Total votes		163	100.0%

1976 Maine House District 23 General Election
Party	Candidate	Votes	%
Democratic	G. William Diamond	2,138	50.9%
Republican	Barbara E. Strout	2,062	49.1%
Total votes		4,200	100.0%

1978 Maine House District 23 Democratic Primary
Party	Candidate	Votes	%
Democratic	G. William Diamond	375	100%
Total votes		375	100.0%

1978 Maine House District 23 General Election
Party	Candidate	Votes	%
Democratic	G. William Diamond	2,441	79.4%
Republican	Carole L. Bean	633	20.6%
Total votes		3,074	100.0%

1980 Maine House District 23 Democratic Primary
Party	Candidate	Votes	%
Democratic	G. William Diamond	118	100%
Total votes		118	100.0%

1980 Maine House District 23 General Election
Party	Candidate	Votes	%
Democratic	G. William Diamond	4,477	100%
Total votes		4,477	100.0%

=== Maine Senate ===
1982 Maine Senate District 6 General Election
Party	Candidate	Votes	%
Democratic	G. William Diamond	11,049	55.8%
Republican	David G. Huber	8,748	44.2%
Total votes		19,797	100.0%

1984 Maine Senate District 27 General Election
Party	Candidate	Votes	%
Democratic	G. William Diamond	10,963	61.5%
Republican	Kenneth M. Cole III	6,869	38.5%
Total votes		17,832	100.0%

(Diamond served as the Maine Secretary of State from 1989 to 1997.)

2004 Maine Senate District 12 Democratic Primary
Party	Candidate	Votes	%
Democratic	G. William Diamond		
Total votes			100.0%

2004 Maine Senate District 12 General Election
Party	Candidate	Votes	%
Democratic	G. William Diamond	11,632	55.4%
Republican	Joseph Bruno	9,366	44.6%
Total votes		20,998	100.0%

2006 Maine Senate District 12 Democratic Primary
Party	Candidate	Votes	%
Democratic	G. William Diamond		100%
Total votes			100.0%

2006 Maine Senate District 12 General Election
Party	Candidate	Votes	%
Democratic	G. William Diamond	10,020	64.4%
Republican	Lani S. Kelly	5,531	35.6%
Total votes		15,551	100.0%

2008 Maine Senate District 12 Democratic Primary
Party	Candidate	Votes	%
Democratic	G. William Diamond		100%
Total votes			100.0%

2008 Maine Senate District 12 General Election
Party	Candidate	Votes	%
Democratic	Bill Diamond	14,395	67.1%
Republican	Thomas Golebiewski	5,388	25.1%
Green	Lisa Willey	1,664	7.8%
Total votes		21,447	100.0%

2010 Maine Senate District 12 Democratic Primary
Party	Candidate	Votes	%
Democratic	Bill Diamond		100%
Total votes			100.0%

2010 Maine Senate District 12 General Election
Party	Candidate	Votes	%
Democratic	Bill Diamond	10,063	60.1%
Republican	Ann-Marie Grenier	6,667	40.0%
Total votes		16,730	100.0%

2014 Maine Senate District 26 Democratic Primary
Party	Candidate	Votes	%
Democratic	Bill Diamond		100%
Total votes			100.0%

2014 Maine Senate District 26 General Election
Party	Candidate	Votes	%
Democratic	Bill Diamond	10,389	63.1%
Republican	Kaile Warren	6,087	36.9%
Total votes		16,476	100.0%

2016 Maine Senate District 26 General Election
Party	Candidate	Votes	%
Democratic	Bill Diamond	13,081	62.0%
Republican	Ryan McDonald	8,026	38.0%
Total votes		21,107	100.0%

2018 Maine Senate District 26 Democratic Primary
Party	Candidate	Votes	%
Democratic	Bill Diamond	2,402	100%
Total votes		2,402	100.0%

2018 Maine Senate District 26 General Election
Party	Candidate	Votes	%
Democratic	Bill Diamond	14,743	80.5%
Independent	Other/write-in votes	3,574	19.5%
Total votes		18,317	100.0%

2020 Maine Senate District 26 Democratic Primary
Party	Candidate	Votes	%
Democratic	Bill Diamond	3,528	100%
Total votes		3,528	100.0%

2020 Maine Senate District 26 General Election
Party	Candidate	Votes	%
Democratic	Bill Diamond	14,267	60.7%
Republican	Karen Lockwood	9,219	39.3%
Total votes		23,486	100.0%

Political offices
Preceded by Rodney S. Quinn	Secretary of State of Maine; 1989–1996	Succeeded by Dan Gwadosky
