= USS Chickasaw (1864) =

Milwaukee-class American river monitor

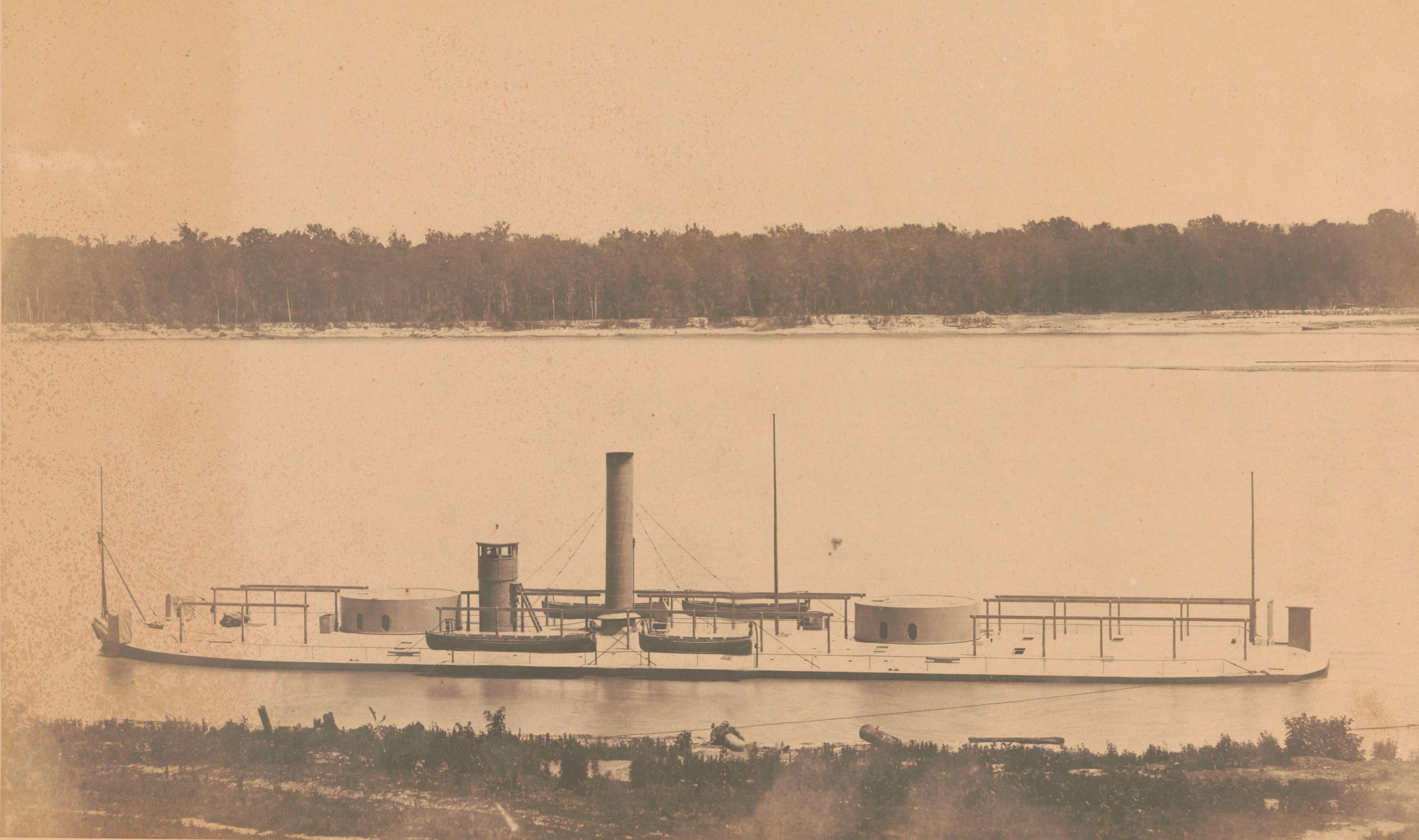
- USS Chickasaw

History

United States
- Name: USS Chickasaw
- Namesake: Chickasaw Indians
- Builder: Gaylord, Son and Co., St. Louis, Missouri
- Laid down: 1862
- Launched: 10 February 1864
- Commissioned: 14 May 1864
- Decommissioned: 6 July 1865
- Renamed: Samson, 15 June 1869; Chickasaw, 10 August 1869
- Fate: Sold, 12 September 1874
- Owner: New Orleans Pacific Railway Company
- Acquired: 12 September 1874
- Renamed: Samson, 1874
- Renamed: Gouldsboro, 1880
- Fate: Sold, 1940s
- Owner: New Orleans Coal & Bisso Towboat Co.
- Acquired: 1940s
- Fate: Sank, 1950s

General characteristics
- Class & type: Milwaukee-class monitor
- Displacement: 1,300 long tons (1,300 t)
- Tons burthen: 970 bm
- Length: 229 ft (69.8 m)
- Beam: 56 ft (17.1 m)
- Draft: 6 ft (1.8 m)
- Depth of hold: 8 ft 6 in (2.6 m)
- Installed power: 7 × Tubular boilers
- Propulsion: 4 × Shafts; 2 × Non-condensing steam engines
- Speed: 9 knots (17 km/h; 10 mph)
- Complement: 138
- Armament: 2 × 2 - 11-inch (279 mm) Smoothbore Dahlgren guns
- Armor: Gun turrets: 8 in (203 mm); Side: 3 in (76 mm); Deck: .75 in (19 mm); Conning tower: 3 in (76 mm)

USS Chickasaw was an ironclad Milwaukee-class river monitor built for the United States Navy during the American Civil War. The ship participated in the Battle of Mobile Bay in August 1864, during which she was lightly damaged, and the bombardments of Forts Gaines and Morgan as Union troops besieged the fortifications defending the bay. In March–April 1865, Chickasaw again supported Union forces during the Mobile Campaign as they attacked Confederate fortifications defending the city of Mobile, Alabama.

She was placed in reserve after the end of the war and sold in 1874. Her new owners converted Chickasaw into a train ferry in 1881 and renamed her Gouldsboro. The ship was later converted into a barge and remained in use until she sank sometime during the 1950s. Her wreck was discovered in the Mississippi River in New Orleans in 2003, although there are no plans to raise her.

== Description ==
Chickasaw was 229 feet (69.8 m) long overall and had a beam of 56 feet (17.1 m). The ship had a depth of hold of 8 feet 6 inches (2.6 m) and a draft of 6 feet (1.8 m). She was 970 tons burthen and displaced 1,300 long tons (1,300 t). Her crew numbered 138 officers and enlisted men.

The ship was powered by two 2-cylinder horizontal non-condensing steam engines, each driving two propellers, using steam generated by seven tubular boilers. The engines were designed to reach a top speed of 9 knots (17 km/h; 10 mph). Chickasaw carried 156 long tons (159 t) of coal.

The ship's main armament consisted of four smoothbore, muzzle-loading 11-inch Dahlgren guns mounted in two twin-gun turrets. Unlike her sisters, both of her turrets were designed by John Ericsson. Each gun weighed approximately 16,000 pounds (7,300 kg) and could fire a 136-pound (61.7 kg) shell up to a range of 3,650 yards (3,340 m) at an elevation of +15°.

The cylindrical turrets were protected by eight layers of wrought iron 1-inch (25 mm) plates. The sides of the hull consisted of three layers of one-inch plates, backed by 15 inches (380 mm) of pine. The deck was heavily cambered to allow headroom for the crew on such a shallow draft and it consisted of iron plates .75 inches (19 mm) thick. The pilothouse, positioned behind and above the fore turret, was protected by 3 inches (76 mm) of armor.

== Construction and service ==
James Eads was awarded the contracts for all four of the Milwaukee-class ships. He subcontracted Chickasaw to Gaylord, Son and Co. of St. Louis, Missouri who laid down the ship in 1862. She was the first U.S. Navy ship to be named after the Indian tribe, and was launched on 10 February 1864. Chickasaw was brought to Mound City, Illinois, on the Ohio River, on 8 May for fitting out and commissioned on 14 May 1864.

After commissioning, Chickasaw patrolled the Mississippi River against Confederate raids and ambushes for several months. She was transferred to Rear Admiral David Farragut's West Gulf Blockading Squadron on 9 July, together with her sister Winnebago. The ship required some time to refit at New Orleans and prepare for the voyage to Mobile across the Gulf of Mexico, so the two sisters did not depart New Orleans until 29 July. On the voyage down the Mississippi to the Pass A Loutre, Chickasaw was forced to anchor overnight because of steering problems and the two ships did not cross the sandbar at the mouth of the pass until the evening of the following day. Once in the Gulf, Chickasaw was taken under tow by the sidewheel gunboat Tennessee for the voyage across the Gulf. The two ships were forced to stop at Ship Island so Chickasaw's engines could be repaired. That required only a day and the sidewheel gunboat Metacomet towed the monitor the rest of the way.

Farragut briefed Lieutenant Commander George H. Perkins, Chickasaw's commander, on his ship's intended role in the battle. The larger, more heavily armed monitors Tecumseh and Manhattan were to keep the ironclad ram CSS Tennessee away from the vulnerable wooden ships while they were passing Fort Morgan and then sink her. Chickasaw and Winnebago were to engage the fort until all of the wooden ships had passed. The four monitors would form the starboard column of ships, closest to Fort Morgan, with Chickasaw in the rear, while the wooden ships formed a separate column to port. The eastern side of the channel closest to Fort Morgan was free of obstacles, but "torpedoes", as mines were called at the time, were known to be present west of a prominent black buoy in the channel.

The two Milwaukee-class ships bombarded Fort Morgan for about an hour and a half while the wooden ships passed through the mouth of Mobile Bay. Chickasaw fired 75 rounds at the fort beginning at 07:10; the return fire badly damaged her funnel so that the crew was forced to use tallow and coal tar to generate enough steam to keep the ship in the fight. She engaged the Tennessee two hours later until the ironclad surrendered at 10:40. The Confederate ironclad was shooting at the wooden ships at this time at point-blank range in a chaotic melee with both sides making multiple attempts to ram each other. Chickasaw remained off the Tennessee's stern through their engagement and fired on her at ranges between 10 and 50 yards (9.1 and 45.7 m). None of her 52 shells penetrated their target's armor, but they did jam shut several of the armored shutters that protected the aft gun ports, including the stern gun port at 09:40. Perkins claimed that his ship shot away the Tennessee's flagstaff, smokestack and the exposed steering chains that controlled her rudder. Chickasaw was struck 11 times during the action, with one shot penetrating her deck that set some of the crew's hammocks on fire. Two of Chickasaw's sailors, Chief Boatswain's Mate Andrew Jones and Master-at-Arms James Seanor, were later awarded the Medal of Honor for their actions during the battle.

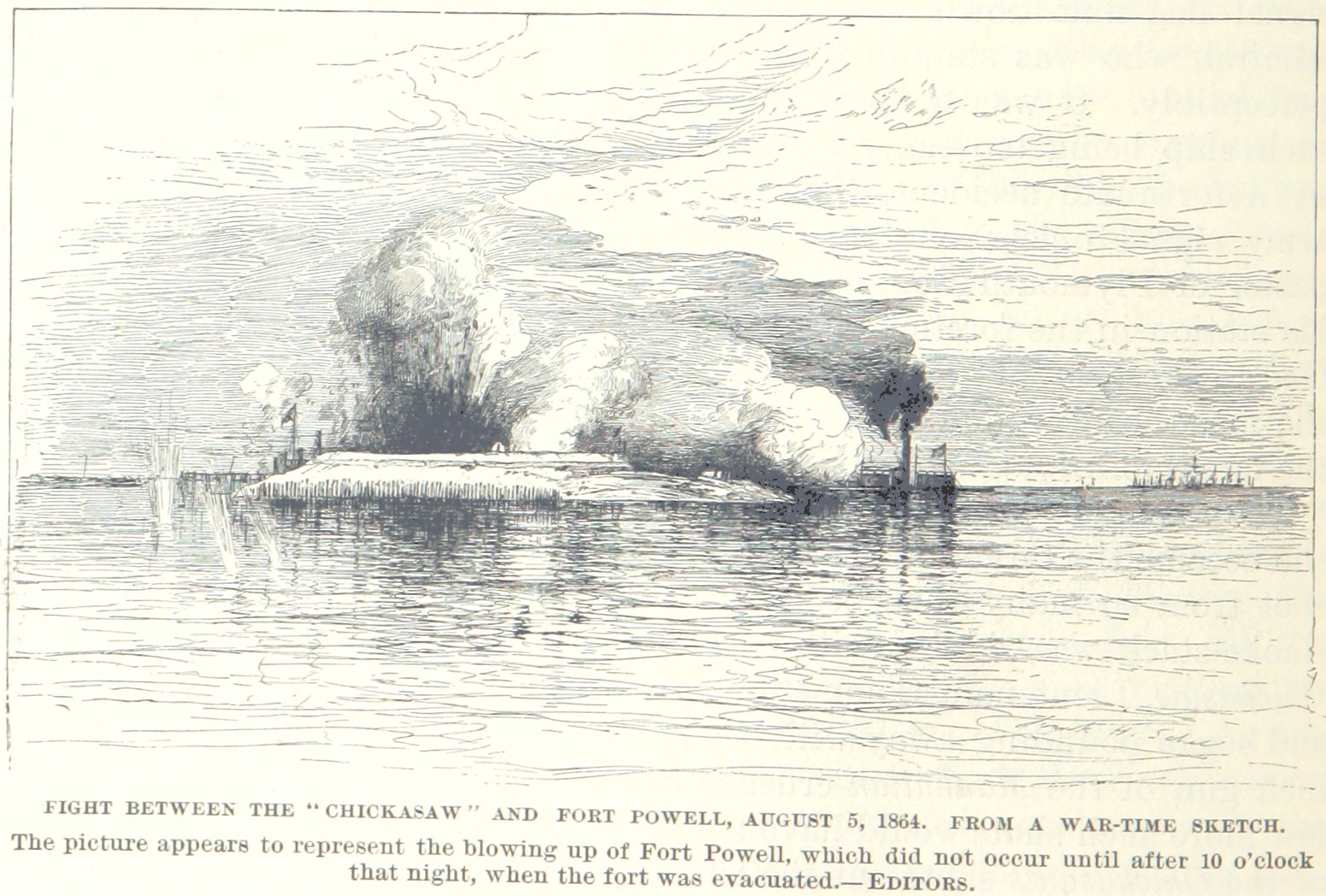
Chickasaw fights Fort Powell

Later that day, the ship captured a barge out from under the guns of Fort Powell, a fortification guarding another entrance to Mobile Bay further north. Chickasaw fired 25 shots at the fort and was struck once, another hit on her smokestack. On 6 August, the ship bombarded Fort Gaines for two hours in support of troops besieging the fort. Beginning on 13 August, she intermittently bombarded Fort Morgan until the fort surrendered on 23 August. Between 15 and 17 August, Chickasaw was operating further north in Mobile Bay and engaged several of the ships defending Mobile without result.

In March–April 1865, Chickasaw bombarded fortifications during the Battles of Spanish Fort and Fort Blakley. Together with the ironclad Cincinnati and the steamboat Nyanza, under the overall command of Captain Edward Simpson, Chickasaw sailed up the Tombigbee River on 9 May 1865 to Nanna Hubba Bluff where Simpson accepted the surrender of the casemate ironclad Nashville, the gunboats Baltic and Morgan, and the river boat Black Diamond from Commodore Ebenezer Ferrand. The monitor remained in the vicinity of Mobile Bay until 3 July when she sailed for New Orleans.

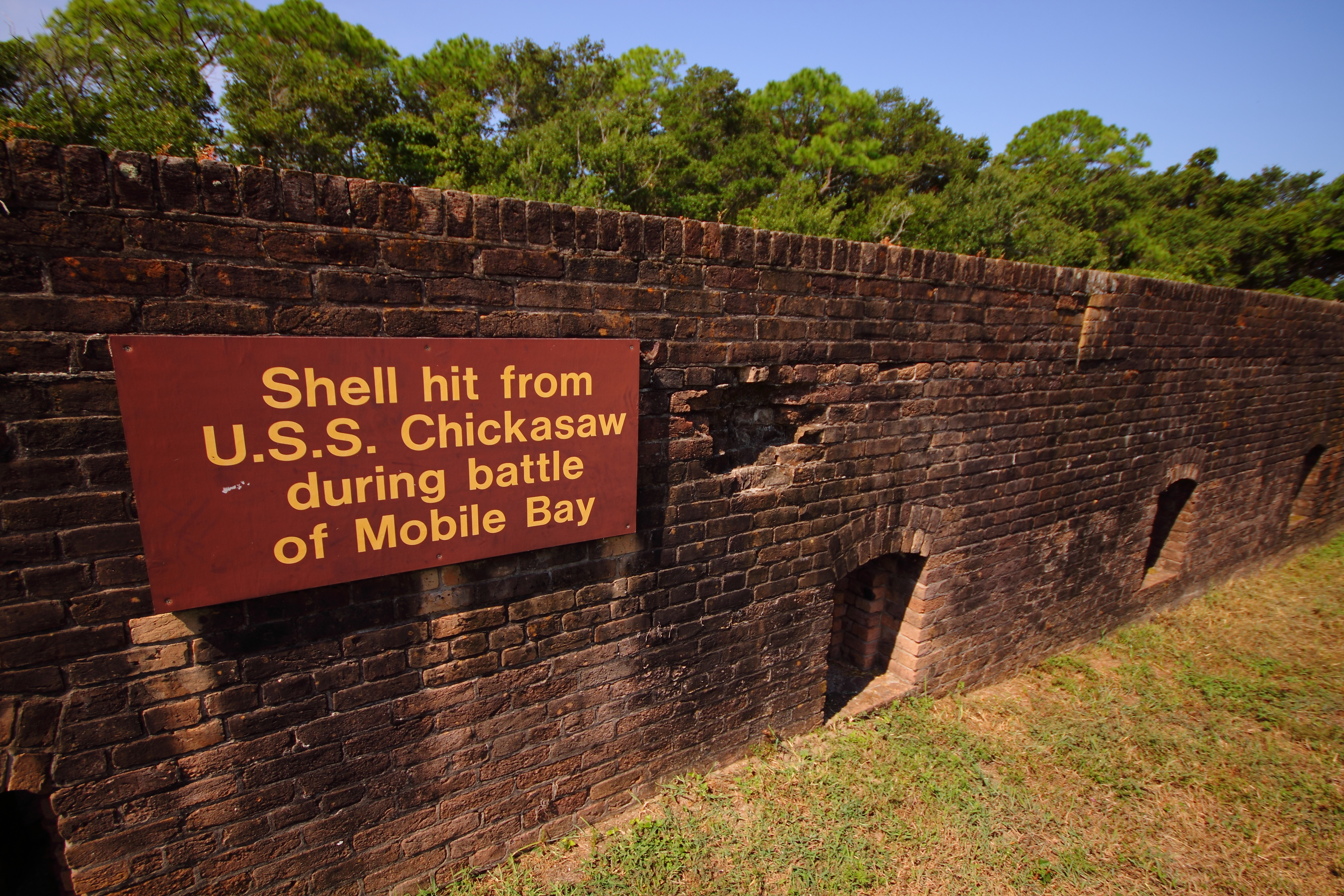
Ft. Gaines Shell Hit From USS Chickasaw

== Post-war career and heritage ==
The train ferry Gouldsboro, ca. 1938

Upon her arrival at New Orleans on 6 July, Chickasaw was decommissioned. She temporarily bore the name Samson between 15 June and 10 August 1869 before resuming her original name. She was sold on 12 September 1874 to the New Orleans Pacific Railway Company who modified the ship into a coal barge with the name of Samson. The railroad converted the ship into a train ferry in 1880 and changed her to side-wheel propulsion under the name Gouldsboro. She was sold in the 1940s to the New Orleans Coal & Bisso Towboat Co. and converted into a work barge. It sank off the Greenville Bend of the Mississippi River in New Orleans sometime during the 1950s.

The wreck of the Gouldsboro was discovered when a section of riverbank collapsed in 2003 and the Army Corps of Engineers surveyed the area in 2004 to determine how best to stabilize the riverbank. There are no plans to raise the wreck, but the Corps of Engineers will preserve it in place.
