= Edgar C. Smith =

American jurist, author, and government official (1870–1934)

Secretary of State of Maine
- In office 1927–1933
- Preceded by: Frank W. Ball
- Succeeded by: Robinson C. Tobey

Personal details
- Born: February 12, 1870 Brownville, Maine, U.S.
- Died: February 21, 1934 (aged 64) Augusta, Maine, U.S.
- Resting place: Brownville Village Cemetery; Brownville, Maine, U.S.
- Party: Republican
- Spouse: Harriette M. Ladd (m. 1893; died 1917)
- Children: 2
- Occupation: Author; Lawyer; Judge

Edgar Crosby Smith (February 12, 1870 – February 21, 1934) was an American jurist, author, and government official who was Secretary of State of Maine from 1927 to 1933.

== Early life ==
Smith was born in Brownville, Maine, on February 12, 1870, to Samuel Atwood and Martha (Jenks) Smith. He graduated from the East Maine Conference Seminary in 1890. He worked in a bank and in the office of the clerk of courts at Ellsworth, Maine. From 1891 to 1892, he read law in the office of Miles W. McIntosh in Brownville. He worked in the shoe business from 1892 to 1894, then resumed his studies under McIntosh.

On January 18, 1893, Smith married Harriette M. Ladd in Foxcroft, Maine. They had two children.

== Writing ==
Smith authored Life of Moses Greenleaf, Maine's First Mapmaker and Bibliography of the Maps of Maine. He wrote Our Eastern Boundary Controversy for Hatch's History of Maine. He also wrote historical sketches for Sprague's Journal of Maine History, the Lewiston Journal, and other publications.

== Career ==
Smith was admitted to the bar in 1895. From 1871 to 1901, he was in a partnership with Joseph B. Peaks. Smith was judge of the Dover municipal court from 1901 to 1911. He held political offices in Brownville, including tax collector and superintendent of schools. In Foxcroft, he was a member of the school board.

In 1921, Smith was appointed Deputy Secretary of State of Maine by Frank W. Ball. Ball retired in 1927 and Smith was elected to succeed him. He was reelected in 1929 and 1931. Smith ran for a fourth term in 1933, but due to his poor health, Republican legislators feared he would be unable to complete his term and governor Louis J. Brann would appoint a Democrat. Smith's deputy Robinson C. Tobey was nominated instead. Smith did not recover from his illness and died on February 21, 1934.
