= Tim Nangle =

American politician

Timothy Nangle

Member of the Maine Senate from the 26 district
- Incumbent
- Assumed office November 7, 2022
- Preceded by: William Diamond

Personal details
- Party: Democratic
- Website: Website

Timothy Nangle is an American politician from Windham, Maine. Nangle was born in Boxford, Massachusetts, as the youngest of 10 children. At the age of 17, he became a police dispatcher in his hometown. He then became a paramedic and moved to Maine where he worked as a paramedic for 27 years.

Read more about him at nangleformaine.com

== Political career ==
Nangle started his political career on the Windham town council. Being elected in 2015 and 2018.

In 2022 Nangle ran for a seat in the Maine State Senate. He ran unopposed in the primary, and in the general election won by 2% of the vote.

== Electoral history ==
Democratic Primary for Maine State Senate District 26, 2022
Party	Candidate	Votes	%
Democratic	Timothy Nangle	1,576	100.0%

General election for Maine State Senate District 26, 2022
Party	Candidate	Votes	%
Democratic	Timothy Nangle	9,734	50.9%
Republican	Gary Plummer	9,388	49.1%
