= Frederick Robie (Secretary of State) =

American politician (1893–1964)

Secretary of State of Maine
- In office 1937–1942
- Preceded by: Lewis O. Barrows
- Succeeded by: Harold I. Goss

Personal details
- Born: September 19, 1893 Gorham, Maine, U.S.
- Died: June 5, 1964 (aged 70) Gorham, Maine, U.S.
- Resting place: Eastern Cemetery; Gorham, Maine, U.S.
- Party: Republican
- Spouse: Alice M. Genthner
- Relations: Frederick Robie (grandfather)
- Children: 3
- Education: University of Maine; Peabody Law School
- Occupation: Farmer; Lawyer; Government official Military officer

Frederick Robie (September 19, 1893 – June 5, 1964) was an American farmer, lawyer, politician, and military officer who was Secretary of State of Maine from 1937 to 1942.

== Early life ==
Robie was born in Gorham, Maine, on September 19, 1893, to William P. and Flora (Barton) Robie. His grandfather, Frederick Robie, was Governor of Maine from 1883 to 1887. Robie graduated from Gorham High School and the University of Maine. On April 12, 1917, he married Alice M. Genthner in Portland, Maine. They had three children.

== World War I ==
Robie enlisted in the National Guard on April 3, 1917. He served in the guard's Coast Artillery Corps until October 5, 1918, when he resigned to accept an officer's commission in the United States Army Air Service. He was assigned to Carruthers Field, where he took part in reconnaissance flights. He did not serve overseas and was discharged on January 7, 1919.

== Post-war ==
From 1919 to 1921, Robie was a district horticultural inspector in Washington. He then worked as a county agricultural inspector in New Hampshire for two years. In 1923, he returned to Gorham and worked as a farmer. In 1928, he enrolled at the Peabody Law School in Portland, Maine. He graduated in 1931 and was admitted to the bar that same year.

== Politics ==
In 1924, Robie was elected to the Maine House of Representatives. He was a member of the agricultural and military affairs committees. He served until in 1929, when he was appointed to the executive council of Governor William Tudor Gardiner. In 1936, Robie was appointed Deputy Secretary of State of Maine by Secretary Lewis O. Barrows. Robie oversaw the department's election and legislative printing divisions. Barrows won the 1936 Maine gubernatorial election and Robie was chosen to succeed him as Secretary of State. He served until May 1942, when he resigned to reenter the United States Army.

== World War II and later military service ==
On May 17, 1942, Robie was assigned to Chanute Field as executive officer. Later that year, he was reassigned to the St. Petersburg Training Center, where he was commanding officer of the 918th technical school squadron. He later spent four years in Europe as a Lieutenant colonel in the military government. Upon returning to the United States, he served in various capacities for the United States Air Force. In 1949, Robie, then working as an instructor at Craig Air Force Base, was promoted to Colonel. After leaving their Air Force, he served in the United States Air Force Reserve until he reached the mandatory retirement age of 60.

== Death ==
On June 5, 1964, Robie suffered a fatal heart attack while trying to move a large rock in his yard.
