= Rodney S. Quinn =

American politician

44th Secretary of State of Maine
- In office 1979–1988
- Governor: Joseph E. Brennan; John R. McKernan Jr.
- Preceded by: Markham Gartley
- Succeeded by: William Diamond

Member of the Maine House of Representatives from the Gorham district
- In office 1974–1978

Personal details
- Born: May 27, 1923 Portland, Maine, U.S.
- Died: October 27, 2012 (aged 89) Scarborough, Maine, U.S.
- Party: Democratic
- Education: Sacramento State College

Rodney Sharon Quinn (May 27, 1923 – October 27, 2012) was an American politician from Maine. A Democrat, he served as the Secretary of State of Maine from 1979 to 1988. He was first elected to the Maine House of Representatives in 1974, after running three times from Gorham. He served as Assistant Majority Leader in the 108th legislature (1977–1979).

At 16, Quinn enlisted in the United States Army and two years later entered pilot training in the United States Army Air Force. He served as a pilot in 1942 during World War II with the Fourteenth Air Force in mainland China as one of seven forward air observers under general Chiang Kai-shek as well as piloting transport planes. He spent the next 27 years in the Army Air Corp and later the United States Air Force, retiring at 45 as a lieutenant colonel.

He attended college while in the Air Force and, after nine years of night school, Quinn earned a B.A. from Sacramento State College followed by a M.A. in political science from Stanford University. He began a Ph.D. at George Washington University but ended his studies when his wife developed cancer, leaving the Air Force during her surgery, from which she recovered fully. He moved to Maine with his wife and their four children, and taught at Cheverus High School in Portland, during which time he was elected to the Gorham Town Council.

Maine is one of three state to elect constitutional officers by legislature, not directly from voters, which leads to the majority party electing their candidate. In 1978, Quinn was elected as the Secretary of State of Maine by the Maine Legislature by one vote over Republican former gubernatorial candidate Linwood Palmer, despite a two-seat majority for the Republicans in the Legislature.

== Political views ==
Quinn advocated for a return to machine politics, in which party bosses largely decide the party nominee, not "activists". He advocated for the return of the straight ticket device, which was removed in 1972 in Maine, to ensure party loyalty.

In April 2011, Quinn published an op-ed in the Portland Press Herald criticizing 2010 independent candidate for Governor Eliot Cutler with helping to elect Republican governor Paul LePage, calling Cutler "a distraction and a danger". Cutler finished second to LePage and nearly 100,000 votes ahead of Democratic nominee Libby Mitchell, but approximately 10,000 votes behind LePage.

== Death ==
Quinn died of pneumonia at a hospice in Scarborough, Maine, in October 2012. His wife Melba had died earlier in the month. He was 89.

Political offices
Preceded by Markham Gartley	Secretary of State of Maine; 1979–1988	Succeeded by William Diamond
