= Andrew Jones (Staffordshire cricketer) =

English cricketer

Personal information
- Full name: Andrew James Jones
- Born: 30 November 1977 (age 48); Stoke-on-Trent, Staffordshire, England
- Batting: Right-handed
- Bowling: Right-arm fast-medium

Domestic team information
- Years: Team
- 1998–2002: Staffordshire

Career statistics
Competition	List A
Matches	1
Runs scored	0
Batting average	0.00
100s/50s	–/–
Top score	0*
Balls bowled	60
Wickets	2
Bowling average	26.00
5 wickets in innings	–
10 wickets in match	–
Best bowling	2/52
Catches/stumpings	–/–
- Source: Cricinfo, 13 June 2011

Andrew James Jones (born 30 November 1977) is a former English cricketer. Jones was a right-handed batsman who bowled right-arm fast-medium. He was born in Stoke-on-Trent, Staffordshire.

Jones made his debut for Staffordshire in the 1998 Minor Counties Championship against Cumberland. Jones played Minor counties cricket for Staffordshire from 1998 to 2002, which included 15 Minor Counties Championship matches and 2 MCCA Knockout Trophy matches. In 2000, he made his only List A appearance against Devon in the NatWest Trophy. In this match, he took the wickets of David Lye and Ian Gompertz. He did bat in the match, but ended unbeaten without scoring any runs.
