= Sidney Perham =

American politician (1819–1907)

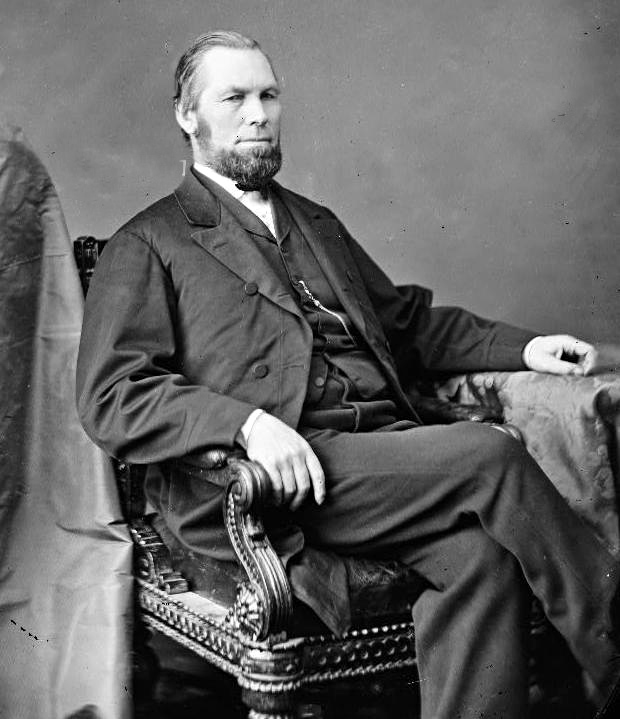
- Perham, 1860–1875

Secretary of State of Maine
- In office 1875
- Preceded by: George G. Stacy
- Succeeded by: S. J. Chadbourne

33rd Governor of Maine
- In office January 4, 1871 – January 7, 1874
- Preceded by: Joshua L. Chamberlain
- Succeeded by: Nelson Dingley, Jr.

Member of the U.S. House of Representatives from Maine's 2nd district
- In office March 4, 1863 – March 3, 1869
- Preceded by: T.A.D. Fessenden
- Succeeded by: Samuel P. Morrill

Member of the Maine House of Representatives
- In office 1854

Personal details
- Born: March 27, 1819 Woodstock, Massachusetts, U.S. (now Maine)
- Died: April 10, 1907 (aged 88) Washington, D.C., U.S.
- Party: Republican

Sidney Perham (March 27, 1819 – April 10, 1907) was a U.S. representative and the 33rd governor of Maine and was an activist in the temperance movement.

== Biography ==
Born in Woodstock (in modern-day Maine, then a part of Massachusetts) to Joel and Sophronia Bisbee Perham, Perham attended common schools as a child, engaged in agricultural pursuits and briefly attended Bates College, but left to pursue a passion for agriculture. He was elected a member of the Maine Board of Agriculture in 1853, was a member of the Maine House of Representatives in 1854, serving as Speaker of the House that one year, and was clerk of the courts of Oxford County, Maine, from 1859 to 1863. He was elected a Republican to the United States House of Representatives in 1862, serving from 1863 to 1869, not being a candidate for renomination in 1868. There, Perham served as chairman of the Committee on Invalid Pensions from 1865 to 1869. He served as president of the board of trustees of Westbrook Seminary in Deering, Maine, from 1865 to 1880. In September 1870, Perham was elected Governor of Maine, serving from 1871 to 1874. He replaced former American Civil War General Joshua Chamberlain as governor. He was president of the board of trustees of Maine Industrial School in Hallowell, Maine, from 1873 to 1898 and was Secretary of State of Maine in 1875. Perham served as a fellow at Bates College from 1871 to 1873. Perham served as appraiser in the United States Customhouse in Portland, Maine, from 1877 to 1885 and was a member of the board of trustees of the Universalist General Convention for twenty-seven years, serving as its president for some time. He died in Washington, D.C., on April 10, 1907 and was interred in Lakeside Cemetery in Bryant Pond, Maine.

== References and external links ==
- United States Congress. "Sidney Perham (id: P000226)". Biographical Directory of the United States Congress.
- Biography of Sidney Perham
- Hon. Sidney Perham Representative men of Maine. A collection of portraits with biographical sketches of residents of the state, who have achieved success ... to which is added the portraits and sketches of all the governors since the formation of the state ... Prepared under the direction of Henry Chase. Portland, Me., The Lakeside press, 1893.

U.S. House of Representatives
Preceded by Thomas A. D. Fessenden	Member of the U.S. House of Representatives from Maine's 2nd congressional district March 4, 1863 – March 3, 1869	Succeeded by Samuel P. Morrill
Political offices
Preceded by Joshua L. Chamberlain	Governor of Maine; 1871–1874	Succeeded by Nelson Dingley, Jr.
Preceded by George G. Stacy	Secretary of State of Maine; 1875	Succeeded by S. J. Chadbourne
Party political offices
Preceded by Joshua Chamberlain	Republican nominee for Governor of Maine; 1870, 1871, 1872	Succeeded by Nelson Dingley Jr.
