= Masardis, Maine =

Town in Maine, United States

- Town
- Location of Masardis, Maine
- Coordinates: 46°30′35″N 68°22′39″W
- Country: United States
- State: Maine
- County: Aroostook

Area
  - Total: 39.92 sq mi (103.39 km^{2})
  - Land: 38.73 sq mi (100.31 km^{2})
  - Water: 1.19 sq mi (3.08 km^{2})
- Elevation: 558 ft (170 m)

Population (2020)
  - Total: 204
  - Density: 5.2/sq mi (2/km^{2})
- Time zone: UTC-5 (Eastern (EST))
  - Summer (DST): UTC-4 (EDT)
- ZIP Code: 04732
- Area code: 207
- FIPS code: 23-43990
- GNIS feature ID: 582583

Masardis is a town in Aroostook County, Maine, United States. The population was 204 at the 2020 census.

== Geography ==
According to the United States Census Bureau, the town has a total area of 39.92 square miles (103.39 km^{2}), of which 38.73 square miles (100.31 km^{2}) is land and 1.19 square miles (3.08 km^{2}) is water.

=== Climate ===
This climatic region is typified by large seasonal temperature differences, with warm to hot (and often humid) summers and cold (sometimes severely cold) winters. According to the Köppen Climate Classification system, Masardis has a humid continental climate, abbreviated "Dfb" on climate maps.

== Demographics ==
Historical population
Census	Pop.	Note	%±
1840	140		—
1860	190		—
1870	169		−11.1%
1880	212		25.4%
1890	250		17.9%
1900	438		75.2%
1910	650		48.4%
1920	690		6.2%
1930	584		−15.4%
1940	601		2.9%
1950	523		−13.0%
1960	408		−22.0%
1970	317		−22.3%
1980	328		3.5%
1990	305		−7.0%
2000	255		−16.4%
2010	249		−2.4%
2020	204		−18.1%
U.S. Decennial Census

=== 2010 census ===
At the 2010 census there were 249 people, 107 households, and 69 families living in the town. The population density was 6.4 inhabitants per square mile (2.5/km^{2}). There were 166 housing units at an average density of 4.3 per square mile (1.7/km^{2}). The racial makeup of the town was 99.2% White, 0.4% Native American, and 0.4% from two or more races. Of the 107 households 24.3% had children under the age of 18 living with them, 53.3% were married couples living together, 2.8% had a female householder with no husband present, 8.4% had a male householder with no wife present, and 35.5% were non-families. 29.9% of households were one person and 13% were one person aged 65 or older. The average household size was 2.33 and the average family size was 2.90.

The median age in the town was 46.9 years. 18.5% of residents were under the age of 18; 6.3% were between the ages of 18 and 24; 20.4% were from 25 to 44; 36.8% were from 45 to 64; and 17.7% were 65 or older. The gender makeup of the town was 57.0% male and 43.0% female.

=== 2000 census ===
At the 2000 census there were 255 people, 104 households, and 71 families living in the town. The population density was 6.6 people per square mile (2.5/km^{2}). There were 158 housing units at an average density of 4.1 per square mile (1.6/km^{2}). The racial makeup of the town was 98.43% White, and 1.57% from two or more races. Hispanic or Latino of any race were 0.39%.

Of the 104 households 25.0% had children under the age of 18 living with them, 64.4% were married couples living together, 1.0% had a female householder with no husband present, and 30.8% were non-families. 21.2% of households were one person and 9.6% were one person aged 65 or older. The average household size was 2.45 and the average family size was 2.86.

The age distribution was 23.5% under the age of 18, 4.7% from 18 to 24, 23.9% from 25 to 44, 32.5% from 45 to 64, and 15.3% 65 or older. The median age was 44 years. For every 100 females, there were 121.7 males. For every 100 females age 18 and over, there were 129.4 males.

The median household income was $30,625 and the median family income was $32,083. Males had a median income of $32,321 versus $17,000 for females. The per capita income for the town was $14,716. None of the families and 7.0% of the population were living below the poverty line, including no under eighteens and 5.7% of those over 64.

== Notable person ==
- Ormandel Smith (1842–1915), Secretary of State and Maine State Treasurer
