= Gorham High School (Maine) =

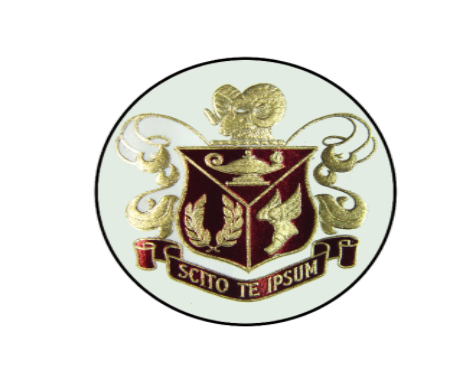

Location
- 41 Morrill Avenue; Gorham, Maine 04038; United States

Information
- Motto: Scito te ipsum (know thyself)
- Established: 1880
- School board: Gorham School Committee
- School district: Gorham Schools
- Superintendent: Heather Perry
- NCES School ID: 230606000158
- Principal: Brian Jandreau
- Teaching staff: 62.70 (FTE)
- Grades: 9–12
- Enrollment: 858 (2025-2026)
- Student to teacher ratio: 12.97
- Colors: Maroon and white
- Song: Hurrah for Gorham High School
- Mascot: Rams
- Yearbook: The SCHOLA
- Website: ghs.gorhamschools.org

Gorham High School, is a public high school located in Gorham, Maine, United States. It houses grades 9–12. The school, in its current building, opened in 1959 and was renovated in 1971-72 and from 1993-1995.

The current principal is Brian Jandreau, with Christina Cifelli and Marc Sawyer serving as assistant principals.

== Athletics ==
Gorham High School is in Class A and B in the athletic classes in Maine. The school offers Alpine Skiing, Baseball, Basketball, Cheerleading, Cross Country, Field Hockey, Football, Golf, Ice Hockey, Indoor & Outdoor Track, Lacrosse, Soccer, Softball, Swimming, Tennis, Volleyball and Wrestling (as a Co-Op with Scarborough). The Athletic Director is Timothy Spear.

=== MPA state championships ===
The school has a total of 50 state championships (Last year won/last appearance):

- Baseball - 2 (2026)
- Boys Basketball - 4 (2000/2005)
- Girls Basketball - 8 (2017/2018)
- Cheerleading - 1 (2001)
- Boys Cross Country - 2 (1971)
- Field Hockey - 4 (1999/2006)
- Golf - 4 (2016)
- Girls Soccer - 4 (2007/2016)
- Boys Soccer - 7 (1981/2018)
- Softball - 4 (1996/2005)
- Boys Tennis - 2 (2013)
- Girls Outdoor Track - 6 (1983)
- Boys Outdoor Track - 1 (2005)

=== Maine State Gatorade Players of the Year ===
- 2019 - Mackenzie Holmes, Girls Basketball - played basketball Indiana University; currently playing for the Seattle Storm
- 2018 - Grace McGouldrick, Softball - played softball at University of Maine
- 2017 - Emily Esposito, Girls Basketball - played basketball at Villanova University and Boston University
- 2008 - Justin Villacci, Football
- 2008 - Rachele Burns, Girls Soccer - played basketball at University of Maine
- 2007 - Kelsey Wilson, Girls Soccer - played soccer at University of Maine
- 2000 - Noel Beagle, Girls Track and Field - played basketball at Yale University

== Co-Curricular ==
The school offers these activities for students:

Clubs & Organizations
- Acoustic Music Club
- Beauty & Beyond Club
- Bee Club
- Best Buddies
- Bingo
- Biotechnology Club
- Chess Club
- Civil Rights Team
- Color Your Calm Club
- Cornhole Club
- Dungeons & Dragons Club
- Dream Factory
- Eco Club
- English Premier League Discussion Group
- Fall Drama
- Fantasy Sports Club
- Fishing Club
- French Club
- Future Healthcare Professionals Club
- Genealogy Club
- GHS Cribbage and Game Club
- GirlUP
- History Club
- INTERACT Club
- Invisible Patients Club
- Key Club
- K-Pop Club
- Law Enforcement Explorers Club
- Lego and Puzzle Club
- Magic the Gathering Club
- Marine Science Club
- Math Team
- Model United Nations
- Mountain Biking Club
- Muslim Student Association
- Musical
- National Honor Society
- One-Act Play
- Origami Club
- Ping Pong Club
- Poetry Out Loud
- Programming Club
- Prom Committee
- Rainbow League (LGBTQ)
- RamPAGE Book Club
- Reading Club
- Robotics Team
- SafeBAEClub
- SCHOLA (Yearbook)
- Scrabble Club
- Sketchy Club
- Spanish Club
- Steel Band
- Student Council
- SSR (Sustained Silent Reading) Club
- Storm Trackers Club
- Table Tennis Club
- Thespian Society
- Truck Club
- True Crime Mysteries Club
- UNO Club
- Vocal Auditions Prep
- Word Games Club
- Writing Club/The Ram Jam (Literary Magazine)
- Yarn Club
- Yoga/Jigsaw Puzzle Club
- Youth in Government

== Notable faculty ==
- Robert Crowley - winner of Survivor: Gabon (taught Science)
- Vivian Blanche Small - president, Lake Erie College
- Adam Parvanta - Milken Educator 2019

== Notable alumni ==
- Mackenzie Holmes - basketball player for the Seattle Storm (Class of 2019)
- Peter Mills - member of the Maine Senate, 1996-2010 (Class of 1961)
- Kim Moody - long-distance runner
- Frederick Robie, Secretary of State of Maine
