= Andrew Jones (Somerset cricketer) =

English cricketer (born 1964)

Andrew Paul Jones (born 22 September 1964) played first-class and List A cricket for Somerset in the 1985 season. He was born at Southampton, Hampshire.

Jones was a tail-end right-handed batsman and a right-arm medium-fast bowler who played principally second eleven cricket for Somerset between 1984 and 1986. In 1985 he played three first-class matches, taking three wickets, though never more than one per innings, and scoring three runs in four visits to the wicket to bat, again never managing more than one run per innings. In his single List A match against the 1985 Zimbabweans, he broke the mould somewhat by scoring three runs, though he reverted to type by taking only one wicket when he bowled.
