= Paul A. MacDonald =

American judge

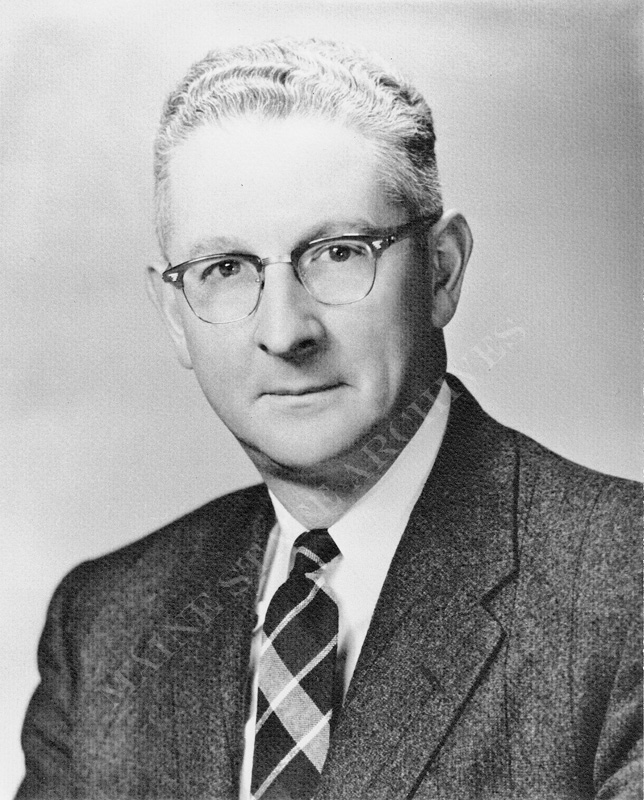

40th Secretary of State of Maine
- In office 1961–1964
- Governor: John H. Reed
- Preceded by: Harold Goss
- Succeeded by: Kenneth M. Curtis

Personal details
- Born: May 5, 1911 Jefferson, Maine
- Died: April 27, 2006 (aged 94) Woolwich, Maine
- Party: Republican
- Education: Suffolk Law School, Boston, Massachusetts

Paul A. MacDonald (1912 – April 27, 2006) was an American politician and lawyer from Maine. A Republican, McDonald was elected by the Maine Legislature as the 40th Secretary of State of Maine from 1961 to 1964. He was born in rural Jefferson, Maine and prior to serving as Secretary of State, served as Clerk to the Legal Affairs Committee of the Maine Legislature and as a Deputy Secretary of State. After leaving the Secretary of State position, he served as a state district court judge for decades.

Political offices
Preceded by Harold I. Goss	Secretary of State of Maine; 1961–1964	Succeeded by Kenneth M. Curtis
