= 1872 Maine gubernatorial election =

- September 9, 1872
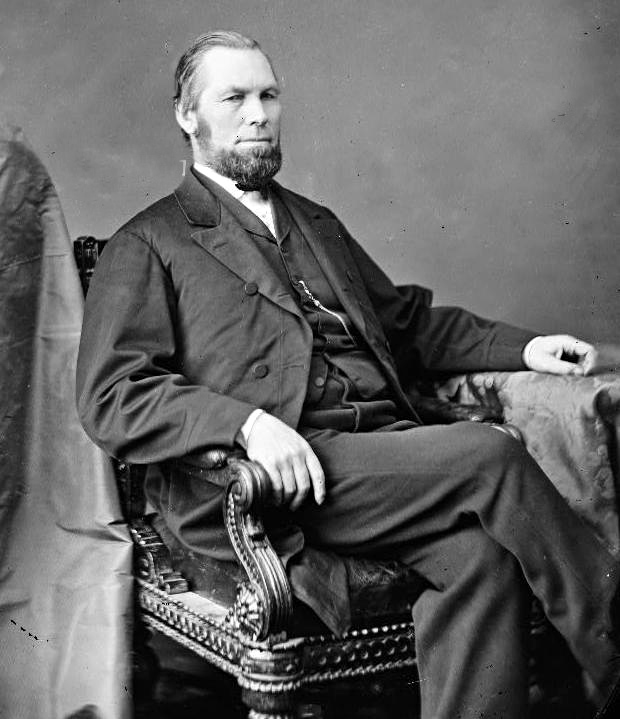

Nominee	Sidney Perham	Charles P. Kimball
Party	Republican	Democratic
Popular vote	71,883	55,343
Percentage	56.49%	43.49%
- County results Perham: 50–60% 60–70%
Governor before election
Sidney Perham
Republican
Elected Governor
Sidney Perham
Republican

The 1872 Maine gubernatorial election was held on September 9, 1872. Incumbent Republican governor Sidney Perham defeated the Democratic candidate Charles P. Kimball.

== General election ==
=== Candidates ===
==== Republican ====
- Sidney Perham

==== Democratic ====
- Charles P. Kimball

=== Results ===
1872 Maine gubernatorial election
Party	Candidate	Votes	%	±%
Republican	Sidney Perham (incumbent)	71,883	56.49%	
Democratic	Charles P. Kimball	55,343	43.49%	
