= Byron Boyd =

American politician

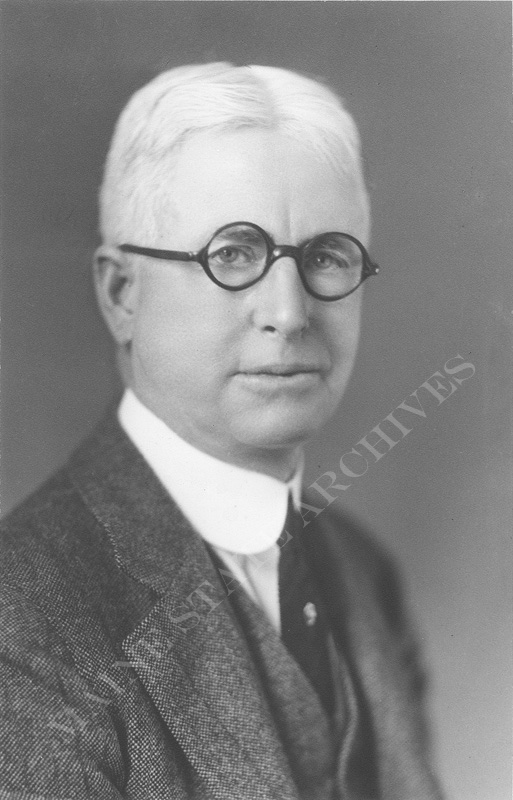

29th Secretary of State of Maine
- In office 1897–1907
- Governor: Llewellyn Powers; John Fremont Hill; William T. Cobb
- Preceded by: Nicholas Fessenden
- Succeeded by: Arthur I. Brown

Personal details
- Born: August 31, 1864 Victoria Corner, New Brunswick, Canada
- Died: June 6, 1941 (aged 76) Augusta, Maine, U.S.
- Party: Republican
- Education: Houlton Academy; Colby College

Robert Byron Boyd (August 31, 1864 – July 6, 1941) was an American politician and businessperson from Maine. A Republican from Augusta, Boyd served as Secretary of State of Maine from 1897 to 1907.

Boyd was born in Carleton County, New Brunswick, Canada in 1864 and moved with his family at the age of four to Linneus, Maine in the United States. He graduated from Houlton Academy, which later became Ricker College as well as Colby College.

He died in 1941 and is buried in Forest Grove Cemetery in Augusta.

Political offices
Preceded by Nicholas Fessenden	Secretary of State of Maine; 1897–1906	Succeeded by Arthur I. Brown
