= Kim Moody (runner) =

American distance runner (born 1955)

Personal information
- Born: 8 June 1955 (age 71) Gorham, Maine, United States

Sport
- Country: United States
- Event(s): Marathon, Ultramarathon
- College team: University of Southern Maine

Achievements and titles
- Personal best(s): Marathon: 2:46:51; 50 miles: 6:01

Kim Moody (born June 8, 1955) is a retired American distance runner who specialized in the marathon and ultramarathon. She competed in the U.S. Olympic Trials marathon in 1984 and 1988 and won numerous ultramarathons in her career. Moody was inducted into the Maine Sports Hall of Fame in 2023.

== Early life ==
Moody grew up in Gorham, Maine and attended Gorham High School and then the University of Southern Maine. She did not run regularly until a foreign exchange trip to Norway in 1973. She ran her first marathon in 1978.

== Career ==
Her first ultramarathon was the 1981 Maine Rowdy Ultimate 24-hour competition, which she won by running 102 miles over 20 hours. Moody's first national-class result in a marathon came in 1984 when she placed 28th at the Boston Marathon. This result qualified her for the 1984 U.S. Olympic Trials marathon, which was won by fellow Maine runner Joan Benoit. Moody did not finish the race due to injury.

In 1985, Moody improved to seventh place at the Boston Marathon in a career-best time of 2:46:51. Over the years, Moody won the Casco Bay Marathon and the Maine Coast Marathon several times.

She excelled at distances further than a marathon, as she won the Chicago National Championship for 50 miles in 1983 with a time of 6:01. She also placed in the top five twice at the Western States 100-miler (1986 and 1987). Moody won the Heritage 50-miler in 1985 and 1986.

In the marathon, she competed in the U.S. Olympic Trials for the second time in 1988, placing 108th of 193 women in a time of 2:53:29.

Moody was inducted into the Maine Running Hall of Fame in 1994 and the Maine Sports Hall of Fame in 2023.

== Personal ==
Moody worked as a registered nurse and raised two children with her husband, David, in Cape Elizabeth, Maine. Her brother, Shawn Moody, ran unsuccessfully for Maine Governor in 2010 and 2018.
