= Dan Gwadosky =

American politician

44th Secretary of State of Maine
- In office 1997–2005
- Governor: Angus King; John Baldacci
- Preceded by: William Diamond
- Succeeded by: Matthew Dunlap

92nd Speaker of the Maine House of Representatives
- In office February 3, 1994 – December 4, 1996
- Preceded by: John L. Martin
- Succeeded by: Libby Mitchell

Member of the Maine House of Representatives
- In office January 3, 1979 – December 4, 1996
- Preceded by: Thomas M. Teague
- Succeeded by: Paul L. Tessier
- Constituency: 94th district (1979–1984); 99th district (1984–1994); 101st district (1994–1996)

Personal details
- Born: February 16, 1954 Waterville, Maine, U.S.
- Died: August 10, 2011 (aged 57) Augusta, Maine, U.S.
- Party: Democratic
- Spouse: Cheryl Norton
- Children: 2
- Education: Thomas College (BS, MA)

Dan A. Gwadosky (February 16, 1954 – August 10, 2011) was an American politician from Maine. A Democrat, Gwadosky was first elected to the Maine House of Representatives in 1978 at the age of 23 and served there for 18 years as well as 8 years as Secretary of State of Maine from 1997 to 2005. Beginning in 2005, Gwadosky was appointed Director of the Bureau of Alcoholic Beverages and Lottery Operations. He was Speaker of the Maine House of Representatives from 1994 to 1996.

== Personal and education ==
Gwadosky was born in Waterville, Maine and grew up in nearby Fairfield, Maine, where he attended Lawrence High School. He earned a B.S. in Management and a M.A. in Computer Technology from Thomas College in Waterville. He was married to Cheryl Norton, who works for Sappi fine paper in Skowhegan.They have two children and lived in Augusta. Gwadosky died in August 2011 of pancreatic cancer.

Maine House of Representatives
Preceded by Thomas M. Teague	Member of the Maine House of Representatives from the 94th district 1979–1984	Succeeded by Leland C. Davis, Jr
Preceded by Nathaniel J. Crowley Sr.	Member of the Maine House of Representatives from the 99th district 1984–1994	Succeeded by Ruth Joseph
Preceded by Louise Townsend	Member of the Maine House of Representatives from the 101st district 1994–1996	Succeeded by Paul L. Tessier
Political offices
Preceded by John L. Martin	Speaker of the Maine House of Representatives; 1994–1996	Succeeded by Libby Mitchell
Preceded by William Diamond	Secretary of State of Maine; 1997–2004	Succeeded by Matthew Dunlap
