= 1871 Maine gubernatorial election =

- September 11, 1871
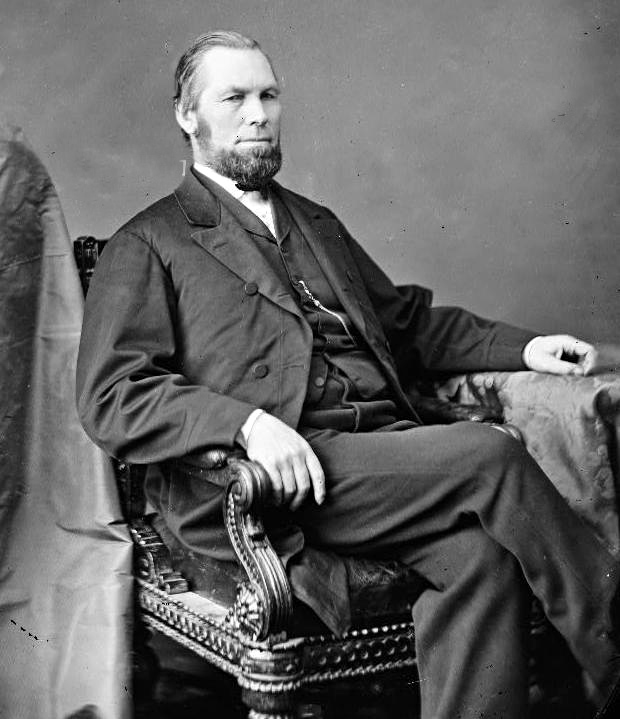

Nominee	Sidney Perham	Charles P. Kimball
Party	Republican	Democratic
Popular vote	58,285	47,538
Percentage	55.06%	44.91%
- County results Perham: 50–60% 60–70% Kimball: 50–60%
Governor before election
Sidney Perham
Republican
Elected Governor
Sidney Perham
Republican

The 1871 Maine gubernatorial election was held on September 11, 1871. Incumbent Republican governor Sidney Perham defeated the Democratic candidate Charles P. Kimball.

== General election ==
=== Candidates ===
==== Republican ====
- Sidney Perham

==== Democratic ====
- Charles P. Kimball

=== Results ===
1871 Maine gubernatorial election
Party	Candidate	Votes	%	±%
Republican	Sidney Perham (incumbent)	58,285	55.06%	
Democratic	Charles P. Kimball	47,538	44.91%	
