= Markham L. Gartley =

American politician

Secretary of State of Maine
- In office 1975–1978
- Governor: James B. Longley
- Preceded by: Joseph T. Edgar
- Succeeded by: Rodney S. Quinn

Personal details
- Born: May 16, 1944 (age 81) Louisville, Kentucky, U.S.
- Party: Democratic (currently a Republican party subscriber though)
- Education: Georgia Institute of Technology

Military service
- Branch/service: United States Navy
- Years of service: 1966–1973
- Rank: Lieutenant
- Battles/wars: Vietnam War

Markham Ligon Gartley (born May 16, 1944) served as Secretary of State of Maine from 1975 to 1978. He is a veteran of the Vietnam War as a lieutenant in the United States Navy and former prisoner of war. Gartley was born in Louisville, Kentucky to Gerald and Minnie-Lee (née Ligon) Gartley. He earned a Bachelor of Science degree in physics from the Georgia Institute of Technology in 1966.
