= Harold I. Goss =

American politician (1882–1962)

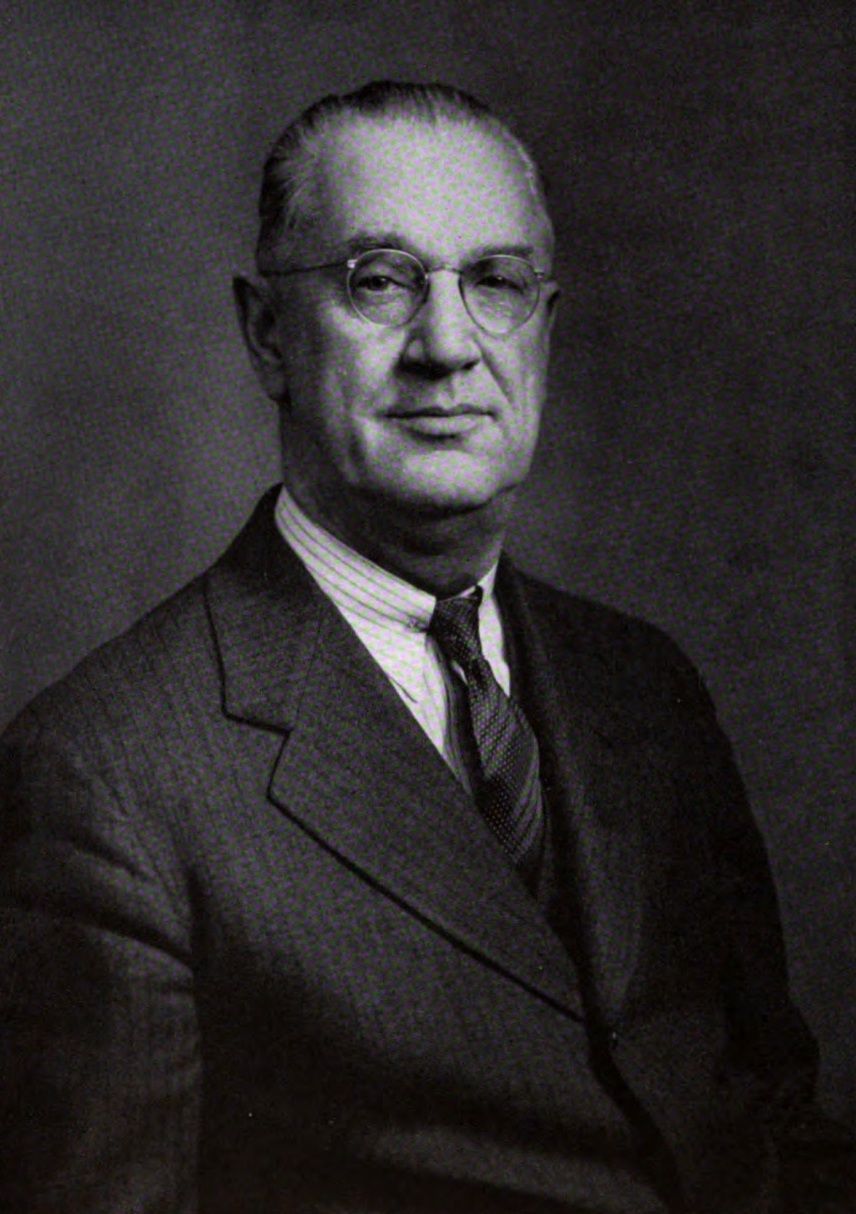
Goss in 1951

Harold I. Goss (November 12, 1882 – May 25, 1962) was an American lawyer and politician who served as Secretary of State of Maine from 1942 to 1960.

== Life ==
Harold I. Goss was born the son of Isaac W. and Elizabeth N. Wentworth Goss in Kennebunk, Maine. Goss was a lawyer and was in 1909 admitted to the bar. A member of the Maine Republican Party, he was Secretary of State of Maine from 1942 to 1960. He is the longest serving Secretary of State in Maine history.

Goss was married to Ester LS Goss. He died on May 25, 1962. His grave is located in the Oak Grove Cemetery in Gardiner.

Political offices
Preceded by Frederick Robie	Secretary of State of Maine; 1942–1960	Succeeded by Paul A. MacDonald
