= S. J. Chadbourne =

American politician

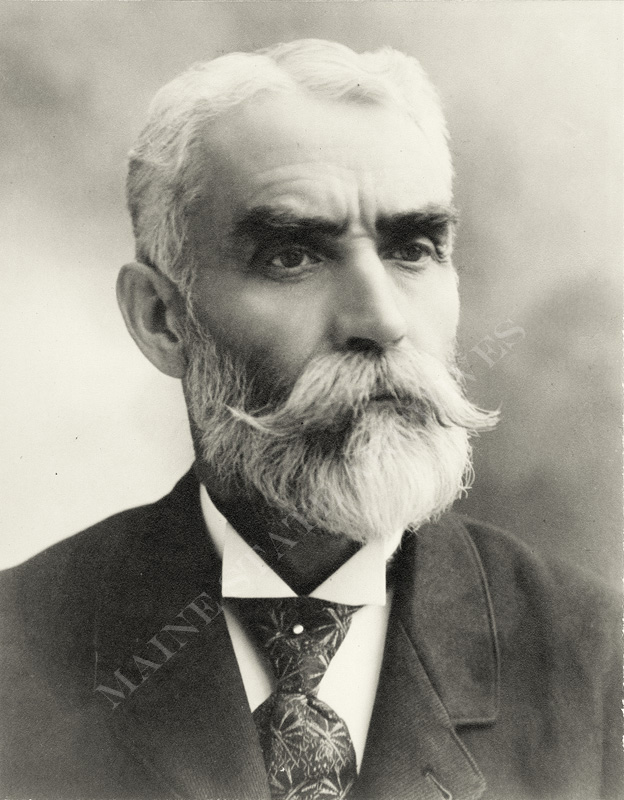

Secretary of State of Maine
- In office 1876–1878
- Governor: Seldon Connor
- Preceded by: Sidney Perham
- Succeeded by: Edward H. Gove
- In office 1880
- Governor: Daniel F. Davis
- Preceded by: Edward H. Gove
- Succeeded by: Joseph O. Smith

Personal details
- Born: July 28, 1830 Dixmont, Maine, U.S.
- Died: October 1, 1902 (aged 72) Augusta, Maine, U.S.
- Party: Democratic (until 1880); Republican (1880)

Sumner John Chadbourne (July 28, 1830 – October 1, 1902) was an American politician in the state of Maine. He served as Secretary of State of Maine from 1876 to 1878, and in 1880. He also served in the Maine House of Representatives.
