= Andy Jones =

Andy Jones may refer to:

== Sports ==
- Andy Jones (footballer, born 1963), Welsh former footballer
- Andy Jones (diver) (born 1985), American high diver, acrobat, and stuntman
- Andy Jones (American football) (born 1994), American football wide receiver
- Andy Jones (ice hockey) (born 1978), American ice hockey coach and player
- Andy Jones-Wilkins (born 1968), American ultrarunner

== Other people ==
- Andy Jones (comedian) (born 1948), Canadian comedian, writer, actor, and director
- Andy Jones (game designer) (1990s)
- Andy Wooding Jones (born 1961), archdeacon of Rochester
- Andy Jones (EastEnders), soap opera character

== See also ==
- Andi Jones (born 1978), English athlete
- Andrew Jones (disambiguation)
