= Nicholas Fessenden =

American attorney and politician

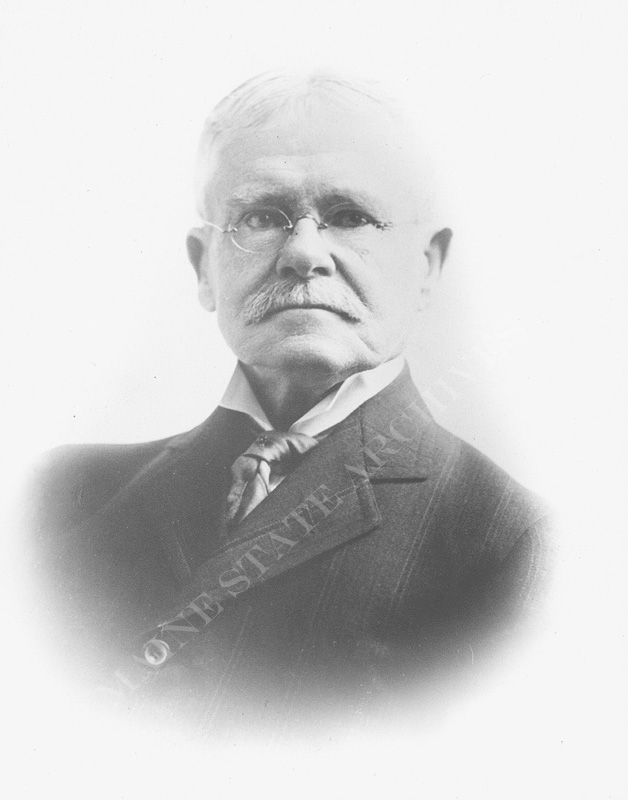

Secretary of State of Maine
- In office 1891–1896
- Governor: Edwin C. Burleigh; Henry B. Cleaves
- Preceded by: Ormandel Smith
- Succeeded by: Byron Boyd

Personal details
- Born: November 23, 1847 Saco, Maine, U.S.
- Died: December 18, 1927 (aged 80) Fort Fairfield, Maine, U.S.
- Party: Republican
- Spouse: Laura Sterling
- Education: Bowdoin College
- Profession: Lawyer

Nicholas Fessenden (November 23, 1847 – December 18, 1927) was a US attorney and politician who served from 1891 to 1896 as Secretary of State of Maine.

== Life ==
Nicholas Fessenden was born in Saco, Maine, the son of Hewett Chandler Fessenden (1819–1885) and Mary Turner Peterson (1820–1912). He came from an influential family. His uncle was member of Congress and Senator William P. Fessenden.

Fessenden studied at Bowdoin College and graduated from there in 1868. He interned at the law firm of John H. French and was admitted as a lawyer in 1868. He was a judge for several years at the Aroostook County court.

As a member of the Republican Party, he was from 1891 to 1896 Secretary of State of Maine. Fessenden served in Fort Fairfield for several years as "Selectmen and overseers of poor", and also as town clerk.

Fessenden was a Freemason and belonged to the Odd Fellows

He married Laura Emily Sterling (1852–1935). The couple had two sons. Stirling Fessenden who was also a lawyer and later chairman of the Shanghai Municipal Council and Reverend Thomas Whittemore Fessenden.

Nicholas Fessenden died on December 18, 1927, in Fort Fairfield, Maine, and was buried there.

Political offices
| Preceded by Ormandel Smith | Secretary of State of Maine; 1891–1896 | Succeeded by Byron Boyd |
