= James Seanor =

- Born: c. 1833; Boston, Massachusetts
- Military career
- Allegiance: United States
- Branch: United States Navy
- Rank: Master-at-Arms
- Units: USS Vincennes; USS Chickasaw
- Conflicts: American Civil War • Battle of Mobile Bay
- Awards: Medal of Honor

James Seanor (born c. 1833, date of death unknown) was a Master-at-Arms in the Union Navy who served during the American Civil War and a recipient of the U.S. military's highest decoration, the Medal of Honor, for his actions at the Battle of Mobile Bay.

Born in about 1833 in Boston, Massachusetts, Seanor was living in New York when he joined the Navy. He served during the Civil War as a master-at-arms on the USS Vincennes. Although their enlistments had expired, Seanor and crewmate Andrew Jones voluntarily transferred to the USS Chickasaw to fight in the Battle of Mobile Bay on August 5, 1864, during which they "carried out [their] duties gallantly". For this action, both Seanor and Jones were awarded the Medal of Honor four months later, on December 31, 1864.

Seanor's official Medal of Honor citation reads:

Served as Master-at-Arms on board the U.S. Ironclad Chickasaw, Mobile Bay, 5 August 1864. Although his enlistment was up, Seanor volunteered for the battle of Mobile Bay, going on board the Chickasaw from the Vincennes where he carried out his duties gallantly throughout the engagement which resulted in the capture of the rebel ram Tennessee.

Seanor later served on the USS Guerriere (1865), and deserted on Christmas Day 1868 when the ship was visiting Montevideo.
