= Samuel P. Morrill =

American politician

Samuel Plummer Morrill
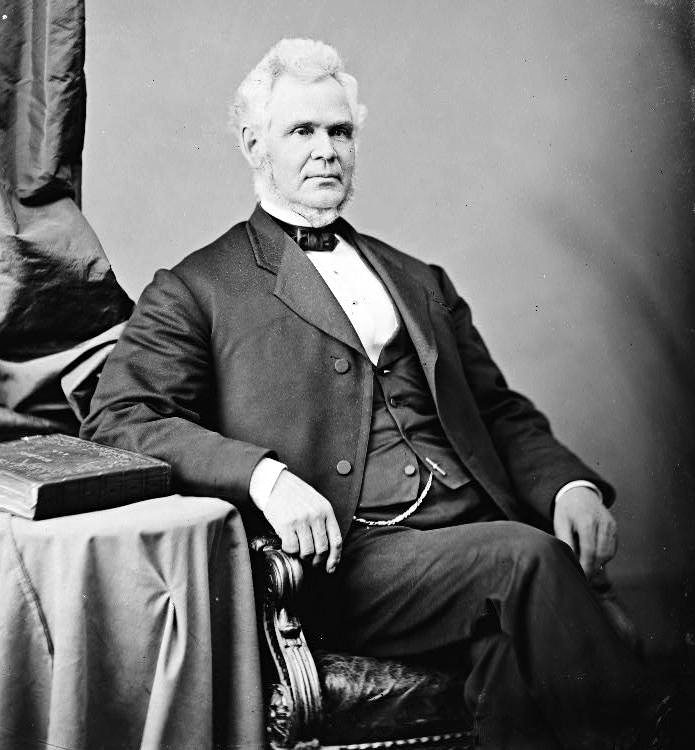

Member of the U.S. House of Representatives from Maine's 2nd district
- In office March 4, 1869 – March 3, 1871
- Preceded by: Sidney Perham
- Succeeded by: William P. Frye

Personal details
- Born: February 11, 1816 Chesterville, Massachusetts (now Maine)
- Died: August 4, 1892 (aged 76) Chesterville, Maine
- Party: Republican
- Profession: Politician, minister

Samuel Plummer Morrill (February 11, 1816 – August 4, 1892) was a nineteenth-century politician and minister from Maine.

Born in Chesterville, Massachusetts (now in Maine), Morrill attended common schools as a child and later attended Farmington Academy in Farmington, Maine. He studied theology, was ordained a minister and held pastorates in Farmington from 1848 to 1853. He was elected register of deeds of Franklin County, Maine in 1857 and was reelected to the position in 1862. Morrill was elected a Republican to the United States House of Representatives in 1868, serving from 1869 to 1871, being unsuccessful for renomination in 1870. Afterward, he resumed ministerial duties in East Dixfield, Maine from 1877 to 1879, moved to Vienna, Maine in 1885 and retired from ministry in 1886. Morrill died in Chesterville, Maine on August 4, 1892, and was interred in Chesterville Hill Cemetery in Chesterville.

U.S. House of Representatives
Preceded by Sidney Perham	Member of the U.S. House of Representatives from Maine's 2nd congressional district March 4, 1869 – March 3, 1871	Succeeded by William P. Frye
