= Ormandel Smith =

American politician

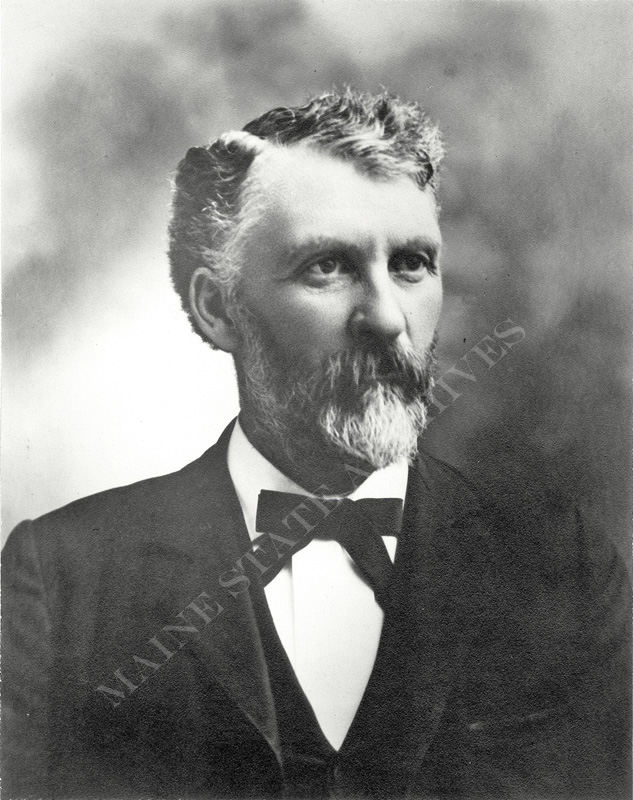

Secretary of State of Maine
- In office 1885–1890
- Governor: Frederick Robie; Joseph R. Bodwell; Sebastian Streeter Marble; Edwin C. Burleigh
- Preceded by: Joseph O. Smith
- Succeeded by: Nicholas Fessenden

Personal details
- Born: December 2, 1842 Masardis, Maine, U.S.
- Died: May 21, 1915 (aged 72) Maine, U.S.
- Party: Republican
- Education: Litchfield Academy and Coburn Classical Institute

Ormandel Smith also spelled Ormandal Smith (December 2, 1842 – May 21, 1915) was an American politician from Maine. Smith, a Republican, served multiple posts in Maine state government from his election to the Maine House of Representatives in 1870 to his time in statewide office as the Secretary of State of Maine (1885 to 1892) and Maine State Treasurer (1901-1906). In Maine, all statewide offices except Governor are elected by the Legislature, not the general electorate.

Smith was born in Masardis, Aroostook County, Maine in 1842 and moved to Litchfield, Maine in 1855. His grandfather, Eliphalet Smith, was an early settler of Litchfield. He was educated in common schools, Litchfield Academy and Coburn Classical Institute in Waterville.

He served for eleven years as either supervisor or member of the local school board. In 1869, he was elected to the Maine House of Representatives, but he resigned in June 1870 to become Deputy U.S. Marshall in charge of the U.S. census in his area. In 1874 and 1875, he was assistant clerk of the Maine House and, in 1876, he was appointed House Clerk. He held that position until 1879. After a year away from the position due to the Democratic/Greenback control of the Maine Legislature, Smith was reappointed in 1880 and served as Clerk until 1885. In April 1883, Smith was appointed state insurance commissioner, which he held until his resignation in September 1884. In 1885, he was appointed Secretary of State, a position he held until 1892. In 1901, he was elected State Treasurer.

Political offices
Preceded by Joseph O. Smith	Secretary of State of Maine; 1885–1892	Succeeded by Nicholas Fessenden
Preceded by F. Marion Simpson	Treasurer of Maine; 1901–1906	Succeeded by Pascal P. Gilmore
