= Franklin M. Drew =

American politician and lawyer

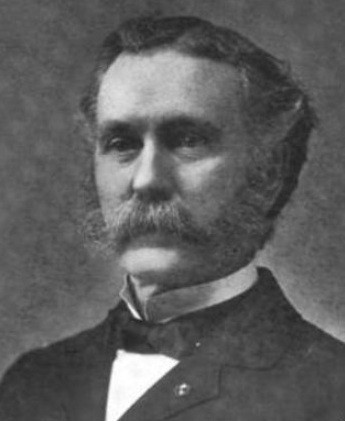

Secretary of State of Maine
- In office 1868–1871
- Governor: Joshua Chamberlain
- Preceded by: Ephraim Flint Jr.
- Succeeded by: George G. Stacy

Personal details
- Born: July 19, 1837 Turner, Maine, U.S.
- Died: February 27, 1925 (aged 87) Lewiston, Maine, U.S.
- Party: Republican
- Education: Bowdoin College
- Profession: lawyer

Franklin M. Drew (July 19, 1837 – February 27, 1925) was an American politician and lawyer in the state of Maine. He served as Secretary of State of Maine from 1868 to 1871. A veteran of the American Civil War, Drew later served as a United States pension agent and a judge of probate in Androscoggin County, Maine.
