= George W. Ladd =

American politician

George Washington Ladd
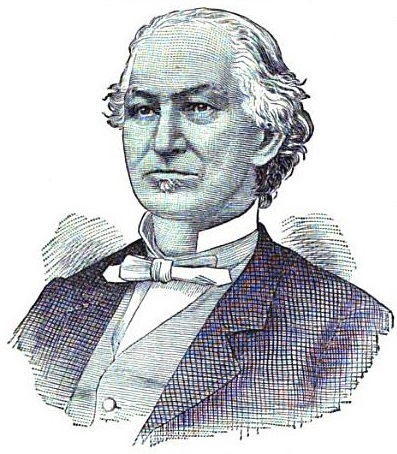
- Ladd in 1882's "Public Men of To-Day" by Phineas Camp Headley.

Member of the U.S. House of Representatives from Maine's 4th district
- In office March 4, 1879 – March 3, 1883
- Preceded by: Llewellyn Powers
- Succeeded by: Charles A. Boutelle

Personal details
- Born: September 28, 1818 Augusta, District of Maine (now Maine), US
- Died: January 30, 1892 (aged 73) Bangor, Maine, US
- Resting place: Mount Hope Cemetery
- Party: Greenback
- Other political affiliations: Whig; Constitutional Union
- Spouse: Marcia C. P. Ingraham
- Children: Abbie Coney Ladd; Sarah Josephine Ladd; William Hamilton Ladd.
- Profession: Druggist

George Washington Ladd (September 28, 1818 – January 30, 1892) was a U.S. representative from Maine.

== Life history ==
Ladd was born on September 28, 1818 to Joseph and Sarah (Hamlin) Ladd in Augusta, District of Maine (now in Maine). Ladd attended the common schools and Kents Hill Seminary.

He engaged in the drug business in Bangor, Maine.

Ladd married Marcia C. P. Ingraham on October 9, 1839.

Later engaged in the lumber, commission, and wholesale grocery business in Bangor. He was also interested in railroad development.

In 1868 Ladd was the Democratic Party nominee for Maine's 4th congressional district.

Ladd was elected as a Greenback Party candidate to the Forty-sixth and Forty-seventh Congresses (March 4, 1879 – March 3, 1883). He was one of only 13 successful Greenback Party candidates for the 46th Congress, and one of 10 for the 47th. In both congresses he was one of only four Greenback congressmen from the northeast, the party's major strength being in the Midwest and South.

Ladd served as chairman of the Committee on Expenditures in the Post Office Department (Forty-sixth Congress).

Ladd was an unsuccessful candidate for reelection in 1882 to the (Forty-eighth Congress).

== Death and burial ==
Ladd died in Bangor, Maine, January 30, 1892. He was interred in Mount Hope Cemetery.

== End notes ==
U.S. House of Representatives
Preceded by Llewellyn Powers	Member of the U.S. House of Representatives from Maine's 4th congressional district March 4, 1879 – March 3, 1883	Succeeded by Charles A. Boutelle
