= Ian Gompertz =

English cricketer (born 1975)

Personal information
- Full name: Ian Gompertz
- Born: Melbourne, Victoria, Australia
- Nickname: Gompz
- Batting: Right-handed
- Bowling: Right-arm medium

Domestic team information
- Years: Team
- 1993-2000: Devon

Career statistics
Competition	LA
Matches	3
Runs scored	41
Batting average	13.66
100s/50s	–/–
Top score	18
Balls bowled	48
Wickets	1
Bowling average	49.00
5 wickets in innings	–
10 wickets in match	–
Best bowling	1/5
Catches/stumpings	–/–
- Source: Cricinfo, 30 December 2010

Ian Gompertz (born 1975) is a former English cricketer. Gompertz was a right-handed batsman who bowled right-arm medium pace. He was born at Royal Melbourne Hospital Melbourne, Victoria, Australia and educated at Blundell's School.

Gompertz made his debut for Devon in the 1993 Minor Counties Championship against Wales Minor Counties and Somerset Second XI's. debut aged 15 against Devon in 1991. From 1993 to 2000, he represented the Devon county in 16 Championship matches, the last of which came against Wiltshire. His MCCA Knockout Trophy debut for the county came against Dorset in 1998. From 1998 to 2000, he represented the county in 11 Trophy matches, the last of which came against Wiltshire.

He won the Daily Telegraph U19 England Batsmen of the Year and Bowler of the Year in 1994; a rare feat achieved via 1,642 runs at av 52.90 and 74 wickets at av 18.99, in a year where he represented England U19 National Association of Young Cricketers and the MCC young cricketers against India, Scotland and Wales. He also represented Devon in The Minor Counties Championship scoring a notable century against Berkshire and in List A cricket. His debut List A match came against Berkshire in the 1999 NatWest Trophy. He played 2 further List A matches for Devon against Staffordshire in the 2000 NatWest Trophy and Surrey in the same competition. In his 3 matches, he scored 41 runs at a batting average of 13.66, with a high score of 18. With the ball he took a single wicket at a bowling average of 39.00, with best figures of 1/5. His debut County Professional career of 1995 at Glamorgan, whilst in his first year of University of Swansea, saw a batting average of 18.36 and minimal bowling at 3/134 was improved on in 1996 with a batting average of 25.23 with a highest score against Yorkshire of 90 and fifties against Worcs and Surrey at The Oval and 5 wickets at 60 average.

Gompertz only played professional Second XI cricket for the Glamorgan and Somerset Second XI's.
