= Dwight A. Brown =

American politician

Dwight A. Brown (1918 – December 17, 1990) was an American businessperson and politician from Maine. Brown, a Republican from Ellsworth, Maine, served in the Legislature from 1957 to 1966, including two terms in the Maine House of Representatives and three in the Maine Senate. During Brown's final term in the Senate, he was Senate Minority Leader. He resigned from the Senate in February 1966 in order to manage his private business.

He owned and operated the Dwight A. Brown Agency.
