= Gary Plummer (politician) =

American politician

Member of the Maine Senate from the 12th district
- In office 2012–2014
- Preceded by: William Diamond
- Succeeded by: William Diamond

Personal details
- Party: Republican

Gary Plummer is an American politician from Maine. Plummer, a Republican from Windham, Maine, served as a member of the Maine Senate, where he represented part of Cumberland County. Plummer was first elected to the Maine House in 2004 and was subsequently re-elected in 2006, 2008 and 2010. He was unable to run for re-election to the Maine House in 2012 and sought to replace William Diamond in Maine Senate (District 12). He did not seek re-election in 2014 and was replaced by Diamond.

Plummer graduated from Gorham Teachers' College in 1968 with a B.A. and from the University of Maine in 1973 with a M.A.

== Career ==
Plummer began serving in local or state office in 1975. He has served on the Windham Town Council and as a Cumberland County Commissioner. Seeking to replace former Secretary of State William Diamond, Plummer's Democratic opponent withdrew following the primary election. Plummer's only opponent was unenrolled Martin Shuer. In November 2012, Plummer beat Shuer with 58% of the vote.
