= John L. Martin =

American politician (born 1941)

91st Speaker of the Maine House of Representatives
- In office 1975–1994
- Preceded by: Richard Hewes
- Succeeded by: Dan Gwadosky

Member of the Maine House of Representatives
- In office December 2, 2014 – December 7, 2022
- Preceded by: Michael Nadeau
- Succeeded by: Kristi Mathieson
- Constituency: 151st district
- In office December 2, 2008 – December 4, 2012
- Preceded by: Troy Jackson
- Succeeded by: Michael Nadeau
- Constituency: 1st district
- In office December 1, 1964 – December 5, 2000
- Succeeded by: Troy Jackson
- Constituency: Aroostook County (1964–1974); 14th district (1974–1984); 151st district (1984–2000)

Member of the Maine Senate
- In office December 5, 2000 – December 2, 2008
- Preceded by: Judy Paradis
- Succeeded by: Troy Jackson
- Constituency: 1st district (2000–2004); 35th district (2004–2008)

President of the National Conference of State Legislatures
- In office 1990–1991
- Preceded by: Lee A. Daniels
- Succeeded by: Bud Burke

Personal details
- Born: June 5, 1941 (age 85) Eagle Lake, Maine, U.S.
- Party: Democratic
- Education: University of Maine
- Profession: educator, University of Maine

John L. Martin (born June 5, 1941, in Eagle Lake, Maine) is an American politician of the Democratic Party. Martin has been in Maine politics since his first election to the Maine House of Representatives in 1964, and is sometimes called "The Earl of Eagle Lake" as a result. With his election in 2014, he is the longest serving legislator in Maine history.

== Political career ==
Martin was a member of the Maine House of Representatives from 1964 through 1996, serving as Minority Floor Leader from 1971 through 1974. Following that he was elected Speaker of the House from 1975 through 1994. In 1992, one of his aides was convicted in a ballot tampering scandal involving two close House races. It is believed that, combined with his length of service, contributed to Maine voters approving legislative term limits in 1993. In criticizing term limits in 2014, Governor Paul LePage cited Martin as an example of how experienced legislators would benefit the State as opposed to inexperienced legislators with "firm agendas".

From 2000 through 2008, Martin represented the 35th district in the Maine Senate. During that time he also served as Assistant Majority Leader.

In 2008, Martin was again elected to the House. He was defeated for re-election in 2012 by Republican Michael Nadeau. Martin stated it was due to money and negative campaigning, stating that "If you throw enough mud around, some of it’s going to stick." Financial problems, including failing to pay back loans from two government agencies for his Tamarack Inn, as well as a bankruptcy, may also have played a role in his defeat. He did not rule out running in the future, and said he would remain involved in politics.

Martin filed to enter the 2014 race for his old seat, which was re-numbered District 151. State records erroneously listed him as a Republican despite his still being a Democrat. Maine Secretary of State Matthew Dunlap stated the error would be corrected. Martin defeated Nadeau in the November 4, 2014 election, and would serve until term-limited in 2022.

In 2024, at the age of 82, Martin declared a run for his old house seat. He would be defeated in a landslide by Republican Lucien Daigle, as the rural, border areas of Aroostook County that were once heavily Democratic have swung to the Republican Party.

== Family ==
Martin is single.

== Education ==
In 1963, Martin received his BA in History/Government from the University of Maine Orono.

== Political experience ==
- From 1964 to 1996, 1998–2000, 2008–2012, and again from 2014 to present, Martin has been a representative for the Maine State House of Representatives
- In 2008 was an assistant majority leader for the Maine State Senate
- From 2000 to 2008 was a senator for Maine State Senate
- From 1975 to 1994 was a Speaker of the House for the Maine State House
- From 1971 to 1974 was a House minority floor leader for the Maine State House
- Member of the Democratic National Committee

== Professional experience ==
- Is an assistant professor in political science and government at the University of Maine Fort Kent.
- Takes part in graduate work in political science at the University of Maine Orono.

Maine House of Representatives
| Preceded by Multi-member district | Member of the Maine House of Representatives from the Aroostook County district 1964–1974 | Constituency abolished |
| New constituency | Member of the Maine House of Representatives from the 14th district 1974–1984 | Succeeded by Norman O. Racine |
| New constituency | Member of the Maine House of Representatives from the 151st district 1984–1996 | Succeeded by Duane J. Belanger |
| Preceded by Duane J. Belanger | Member of the Maine House of Representatives from the 151st district 1998–2000 | Succeeded by Marc E. Michaud |
| Preceded by Troy Jackson | Member of the Maine House of Representatives from the 1st district 2008–2012 | Succeeded by Allen Michael Nadeau |
| Preceded by Deane Rykerson | Member of the Maine House of Representatives from the 151st district 2014–2022 | Succeeded by Kristi Mathieson |
| Preceded by Emilien Levesque | Minority Leader of the Maine House of Representatives; 1971–1975 | Succeeded by Linwood E. Palmer Jr. |
Political offices
| Preceded by Richard Hewes | Speaker of the Maine House of Representatives; 1975–1994 | Succeeded by Dan Gwadosky |
Maine Senate
| Preceded by Judy Paradis | Member of the Maine Senate from the 1st district 2000–2004 | Succeeded by Mary Andrews |
| Preceded by Kenneth F. Lemont | Member of the Maine Senate from the 35th district 2004–2008 | Succeeded by Troy Jackson |
| Preceded by Kenneth Gagnon | Assistant Majority Leader of the Maine Senate; 2006–2008 | Succeeded by Lisa Marrache |
