= Andrew Jones (Medal of Honor) =

- Born: c. 1835; Limerick, Ireland
- Military career
- Allegiance: United States
- Branch: United States Navy
- Rank: Chief Boatswain's Mate
- Units: USS Vincennes; USS Chickasaw
- Conflicts: American Civil War • Battle of Mobile Bay
- Awards: Medal of Honor

Andrew Jones (born c. 1835, date of death unknown) was a Union Navy sailor in the American Civil War and a recipient of the U.S. military's highest decoration, the Medal of Honor, for his actions at the Battle of Mobile Bay.

Born in about 1835 in Limerick, Ireland, Jones immigrated to the United States and was living in New York when he joined the U.S. Navy. He served during the Civil War as a chief boatswain's mate on the USS Vincennes. Although their enlistments had expired, Jones and crewmate James Seanor voluntarily transferred to the USS Chickasaw to fight in the Battle of Mobile Bay on August 5, 1864, during which they "carried out [their] duties gallantly". For this action, both Jones and Seanor were awarded the Medal of Honor four months later, on December 31, 1864.

Jones's official Medal of Honor citation reads:

Served as chief boatswain's mate on board the U.S. Ironclad Chickasaw, Mobile Bay, 5 August 1864. Although his enlistment was up, Jones volunteered for the battle of Mobile Bay, going on board the Chickasaw from the Vincennes where he then carried out his duties gallantly throughout the engagement with the enemy which resulted in the capture of the rebel ram Tennessee.
