= Andrew Jones (bodybuilder) =

American bodybuilder

- Born: March 1, 1990 (age 36); Ohio, U.S.
- Occupation: Bodybuilder

YouTube information
- Channel: ajFitness
- Years active: 2010–2018
- Subscribers: 61 thousand
- Views: 7.8 million
- Last updated: March 28, 2026

Andrew Jones (born March 1, 1990) is an American bodybuilder.

In 2007, Jones created his YouTube channel, uploading his first video Fitness: How to Tone and Build Your Legs on July 23, 2010. In 2012, he was diagnosed with hypertrophic cardiomyopathy. He was admitted to the intensive care unit at Hartford Hospital in Hartford, Connecticut, awaiting for a heart transplant for over four months. While awaiting for his heart transplant, he had to wear a left ventricular assist device that helped transport blood to his body.

In 2015, Jones founded Hearts at Large, a nonprofit charity organization that helps spread awareness for organ donations. In 2016, he underwent his heart transplant, receiving a new heart. On February 10, 2018, he uploaded his last YouTube video What Heart Disease Left Behind, where he showed off his scars from his heart transplant.
