= Edward H. Gove =

American politician

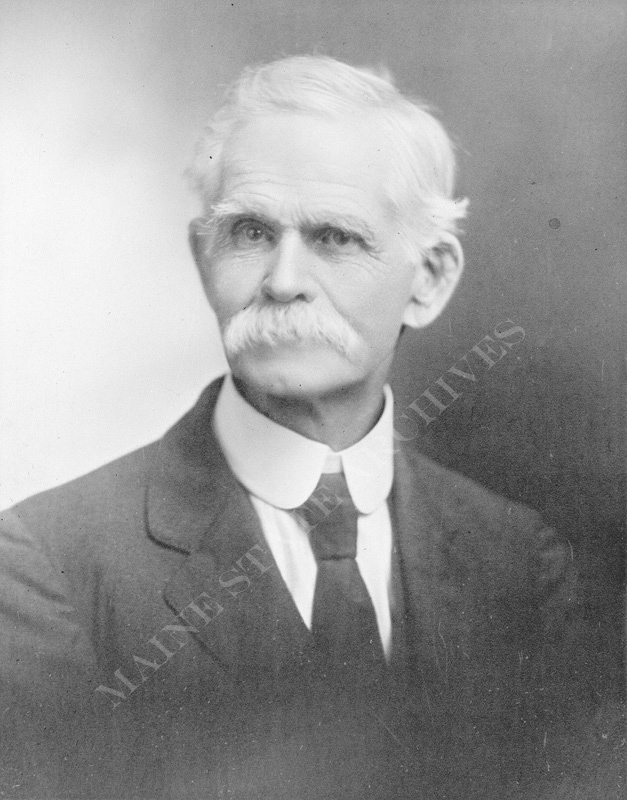

Secretary of State of Maine
- In office 1878–1879
- Governor: Seldon Connor
- Preceded by: S. J. Chadbourne
- Succeeded by: S. J. Chadbourne

Personal details
- Born: June 14, 1847; Biddeford, Maine, U.S.
- Died: January 24, 1928 (aged 80); Biddeford, Maine, U.S.
- Political party: Greenback Party
- Spouse: Elizabeth Jordan
- Profession: lawyer and general insurance agent

Edward Hooper Gove (July 14, 1847 – January 24, 1928) was an American politician in the state of Maine. He served as Secretary of State of Maine from 1878 to 1879.
