= Zimbabwean cricket team in England in 1985 =

The Zimbabwe national cricket team toured England in the 1985 season and played seven first-class matches, mostly against county teams. The Zimbabweans also played two one-day matches.
