= USS Nyanza =

Gunboat of the United States Navy

History

United States
- Laid down: date unknown
- Launched: 1863
- Acquired: 4 November 1863
- Commissioned: 21 December 1863
- Decommissioned: 21 July 1865
- Stricken: 1865 (est.)
- Fate: Sold, 12 August 1865

General characteristics
- Displacement: 203 tons
- Length: not known
- Beam: not known
- Draught: not known
- Propulsion: steam engine; side wheel-propelled
- Speed: not known
- Complement: not known
- Armament: six 24-pounder howitzers

USS Nyanza was a large steamer purchased by the Union Navy during the American Civil War. She was assigned by the Union Navy to gunboat duty in the waterways of the rebellious Confederate States of America.

== Construction ==
Nyanza, a wooden side wheel steamer built at Belle Vernon, Pennsylvania, in 1863, was purchased by the Navy at Cincinnati, Ohio, 4 November 1863; and commissioned at Mound City, Illinois, Acting Lt. Samuel B. Washburn in command 21 December 1863.

== Mississippi river ==
During the Civil War, Nyanza patrolled the Mississippi River and its tributaries protecting Union lines of communication and supply on the great inland waterway and preventing Confederate activity.

She captured schooner J. W. Wilder in the Atchafalaya River, Louisiana, 15 March 1864; and took schooner Mandoline, in Atchafalaya Bay, Louisiana, 13 April.

== Post-war ==
After hostilities ceased, Nyanza decommissioned at New Orleans, Louisiana on 21 July 1865 and was sold at public auction to Owen Finnegan 12 August 1865.

Redocumented 26 August 1865, the side wheeler remained in merchant service until 1873.

== See also ==
- Anaconda Plan
- Mississippi Squadron
