= Frank W. Ball =

American lawyer and politician (1880–1934)

Secretary of State of Maine
- In office 1917–1927
- Preceded by: John E. Bunker
- Succeeded by: Edgar C. Smith

Personal details
- Born: March 12, 1880 Sebec, Maine, U.S.
- Died: July 23, 1934 (aged 54) Bangor, Maine, U.S.
- Party: Republican
- Spouse: Lura Hudson (m. 1904)
- Education: Bangor Business College; University of Maine School of Law
- Occupation: Lawyer

Frank William Ball (March 12, 1880 – July 23, 1934) was an American lawyer and government official who was Secretary of State of Maine from 1917 to 1927.

== Early life ==
Ball was born in Sebec, Maine on March 12, 1880. He was the youngest of six children born to Theodore and Adrianna (Towne) Ball. Ball graduated from Sebec High School, Foxcroft Academy (1898) and Bangor Business College (1899). He read law in the office of Henry Hudson in Guilford, Maine and took a special course at the University of Maine School of Law. On May 11, 1904, he married Lura Hudson in Guilford.

== Career ==
Ball was admitted to the bar in 1903 and began practicing in Greenville, Maine. The following year, he moved to Milo, Maine. In 1907, he was appointed Milo municipal court judge by governor William T. Cobb. In 1910, he moved to Dover, Maine after he was appointed clerk of courts for Piscataquis County by governor Bert M. Fernald.

In 1916, Ball was a candidate for Secretary of State of Maine. He won the Republican nomination, receiving 68 votes to Joseph E. Alexander's 51 and Charles F. Sweet's 12, and was elected by the Republican majority at the joint convention of the Maine Legislature. He was reelected in 1919, 1921, 1923, and 1925. In 1926, he announced he would not seek another term.

Ball served as deputy secretary of state during the 1927 legislative session. He then moved to Bangor, where he worked for the Great Northern Paper Company. In 1930, he formed a law partnership with George E. Thompson.

== Later life ==
On July 4, 1934, Ball fell ill while driving from Portland, Maine to Bangor and was bedridden until his death on July 23. He was interred at the family lot in Sebec.
