= Secretary of State of Maine =

Political office in Maine

- Flag of the State of Maine

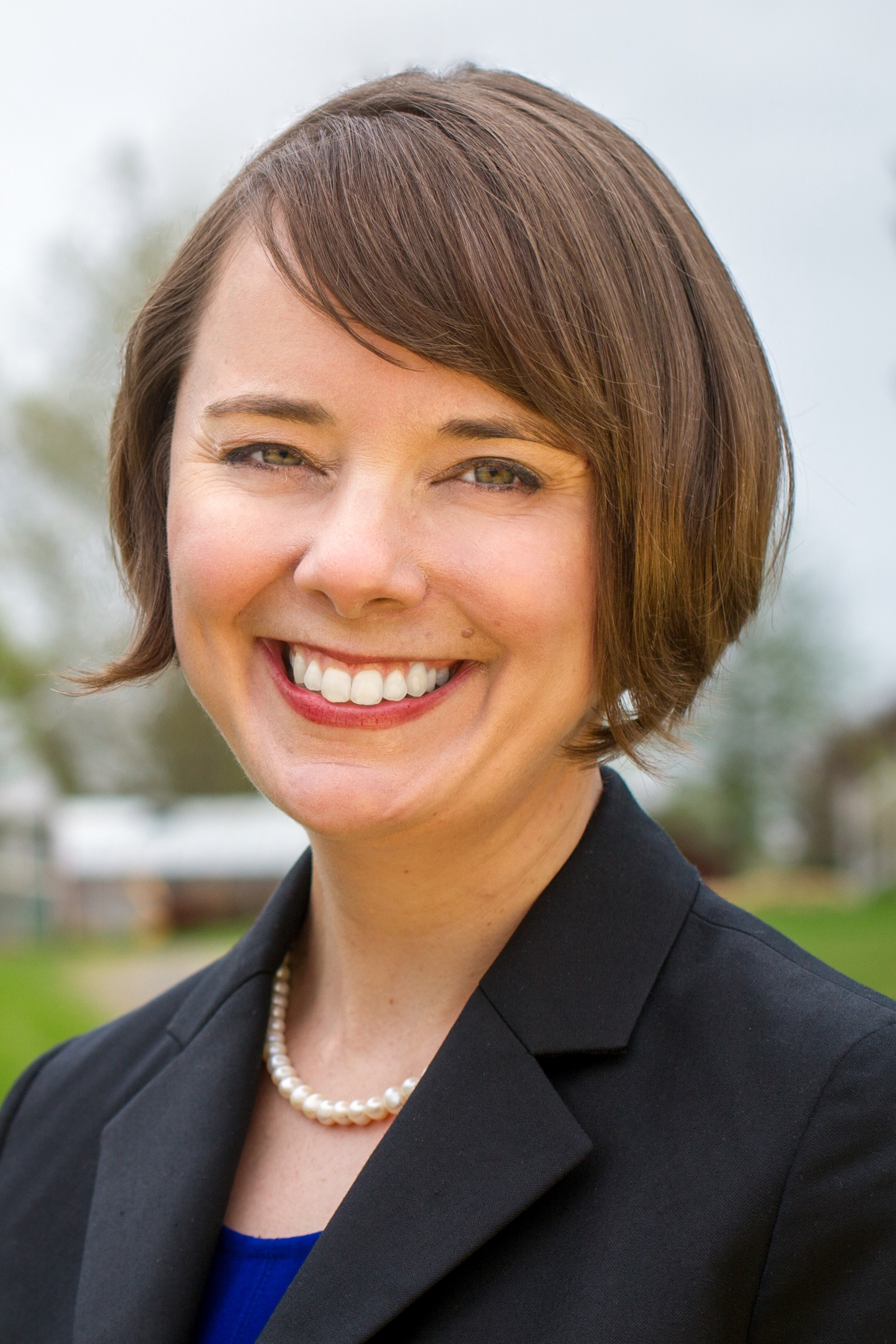
- Incumbent; Shenna Bellows since January 4, 2021
- Style: Madam Secretary (informal); The Honorable (formal)
- Seat: Nash School Building; Augusta, Maine
- Appointer: State legislature
- Term length: 2 years
- Inaugural holder: Ashur Ware
- Formation: March 15, 1820
- Succession: Third
- Deputy: Chief Deputy Secretary of State
- Salary: $100,339
- Website: www.maine.gov/sos

The secretary of state of Maine is a constitutional officer in the U.S. state of Maine and serves as the head of the Maine Department of State. The secretary of state performs duties of both a legislative branch as well as an executive branch officer. The role oversees areas that include motor vehicle licensing, state identification, record keeping, and corporate chartering.

The secretary of state is elected biannually by ballot of members of both houses of the Maine Legislature assembled together, identical in procedure to its neighbor, New Hampshire. The position is elected at the start of the first session of the Maine Legislature, which also sits for a two-year term, concurrent with the other constitutional officers of Maine.

The incumbent secretary of state is Shenna Bellows, who took office on January 4, 2021.

== Duties ==
The secretary of state oversees three distinct areas within their department. These coincide with the three bureaus under their aegis: the Maine Bureau of Corporations, Elections and Commissions, Maine State Archives and Maine Bureau of Motor Vehicles.

=== Corporations, elections, and commissions ===
The secretary of state has oversight over the conduct of elections, petition filing, and state-wide ballot initiatives. They are responsible for applying campaign conduct law against candidates for office. The secretary reviews petitions to verify authenticity of signatures for ballot initiatives under the Maine Constitution.

The secretary of state also oversees and applies the state's corporation law. Corporations seeking to be chartered in Maine do so through the secretary's office. The secretary has oversight over Maine's commercial law and application of the Uniform Commercial Code.

The secretary's office appoints and regulates the state's notaries public.

=== State archives ===
The secretary maintains laws passed in the state and all records of the legislature, state agencies, election returns, vital statistics, county court rulings, and Supreme Judicial Court rulings and proceedings.

=== Motor vehicles ===
The secretary oversees the Maine Bureau of Motor Vehicles and is thus responsible for overseeing identification, motor vehicle registration, vehicle inspections, and other forms of licensing.

== List of secretaries of state ==
The following officials have served as secretary of state of Maine:

Tenure	Image	Secretary of State	Hometown	Party	Notes
1820–1821		Ashur Ware	Portland	Democratic-Republican	
1822–1828		Amos Nichols	Augusta	Democratic-Republican	
1829–1830		Edward Russell	North Yarmouth	National Republican	
1831–1834		Roscoe Greene	Portland	Democratic	
1835–1837		Asaph Nichols	Augusta	Democratic	
1838		Samuel P. Benson	Winthrop	Whig	
1839		Asaph Nichols	Augusta	Democratic	
1840		Philip C. Johnson	Augusta	Democratic	
1841		Samuel P. Benson	Winthrop	Democratic	
1842–1844		Philip C. Johnson	Augusta	Democratic	
1845		William B. Hartwell	Augusta	Democratic	
1846–1849		Ezra B. French	Damariscotta	Democratic	
1850–1853		John G. Sawyer	Augusta	Democratic	
1854–1855		Alden Jackson	Augusta	Whig	
1856		Caleb Ayer	Cornish	Democratic	
1857		Alden Jackson	Augusta	Democratic	
1858–1860		Noah Smith, Jr.	Calais	Republican	
1861–1863		Joseph B. Hall	Presque Isle	Republican	
1864–1867		Ephraim Flint, Jr.	Dover	Republican	
1868–1871		Franklin M. Drew	Brunswick	Republican	
1872–1874		George G. Stacy	Richmond	Republican	Resigned
1875		Sidney Perham	Paris	Republican	Previously served as governor.
1876–1878		S. J. Chadbourne	Dixmont	Democratic	
1879		Edward H. Gove	Biddeford	Greenback	
1880		S. J. Chadbourne	Augusta	Republican	
1881–1884		Joseph O. Smith	Augusta	Republican	
1885–1890		Ormandel Smith	Litchfield	Republican	
1891–1896		Nicholas Fessenden	Fort Fairfield	Republican	
1897–1906		Byron Boyd	Augusta	Republican	
1907–1910		Arthur I. Brown	Belfast	Republican	
1911–1912		Cyrus W. Davis	Waterville	Democrat	
1913–1914		Joseph E. Alexander	Richmond	Republican	
1915–1916		John E. Bunker	Eden	Democrat	
1917–1926		Frank W. Ball	Dover	Republican	
1927–1932		Edgar C. Smith	Augusta	Republican	
1933–1934		Robinson C. Tobey	Augusta	Republican	
1935–1936		Lewis O. Barrows	Newport	Republican	
1937–1941		Frederick Robie	Gorham	Republican	
1942–1960		Harold I. Goss	Gardiner	Republican	Longest-serving Maine Secretary of State
1961–1964		Paul A. MacDonald	Coopers Mills	Republican	
1965–1966		Kenneth M. Curtis	Cape Elizabeth	Democratic	
1967–1974		Joseph T. Edgar	Farmingdale	Republican	
1975–1978		Markham L. Gartley	Greenville	Democratic	Ran unsuccessfully for Congress against Olympia Snowe in 1978.
1979–1988		Rodney S. Quinn	Augusta	Democratic	
1989–1996		William Diamond	Windham	Democratic	
1997–2004		Dan Gwadosky	Fairfield	Democratic	
2005–2010		Matthew Dunlap	Old Town	Democratic	
2011–2012		Charlie Summers	Scarborough	Republican	
2013–2021		Matthew Dunlap	Old Town	Democratic	
2021–present		Shenna Bellows	Manchester	Democratic	Incumbent, First woman to serve as Secretary of State

== See also ==
- List of company registers
