= Regional School Unit 4 =

School district in Androscoggin County, Maine, United States

Address
- 971 Gardiner Road Wales, Androscoggin, Maine, 04280; United States

District information
- Superintendent: Marco Aliberti

Students and staff
- District mascot: Owl, Tiger, Raccoon

Other information
- Website: www.rsu4.org

Regional School Unit 4 (RSU #4) is a school district headquartered in Wales, Maine, United States. It serves Wales, Litchfield, and Sabattus.

In March 2014, the district considered privatizing its school bus services. Voters had previously rejected the proposal in 2012 in a nonbinding referendum.

== Schools ==
- Oak Hill High School (9-12) - Wales
- Oak Hill Middle School (5-8) - Sabattus
- Carrie Ricker School (3-4) - Litchfield
- Libby Tozier School (PK-2) - Litchfield

Sabattus Primary School closed following the 2024/2025 academic year, after the voters of the Regional School Unit voted to do so on April 8, 2025.

== See also ==
- Education in Maine
- Litchfield Academy
- Monmouth Academy
