= Sabattus, Maine =

Town in Maine, United States

- Town
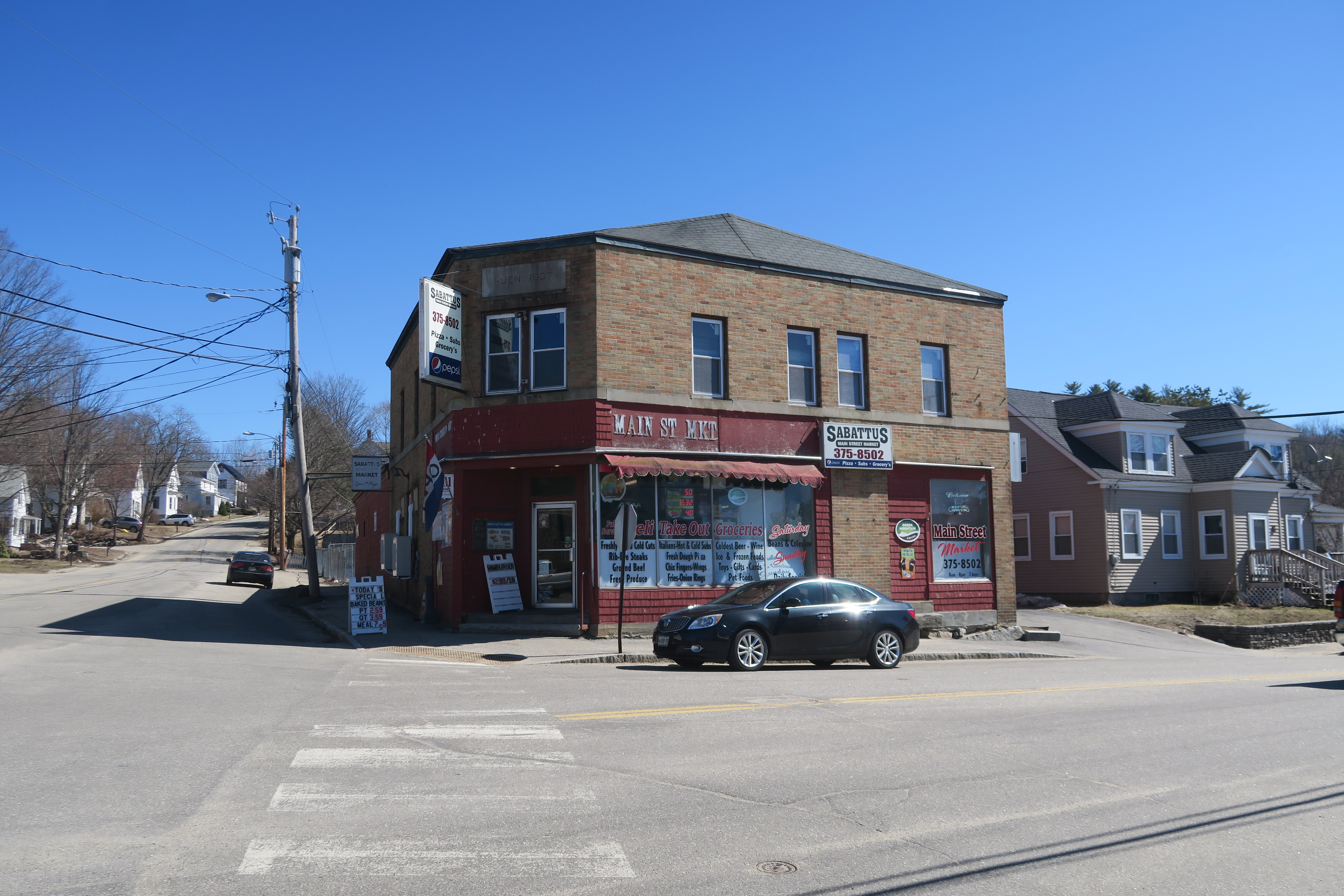
- Main Street Market

- Seal

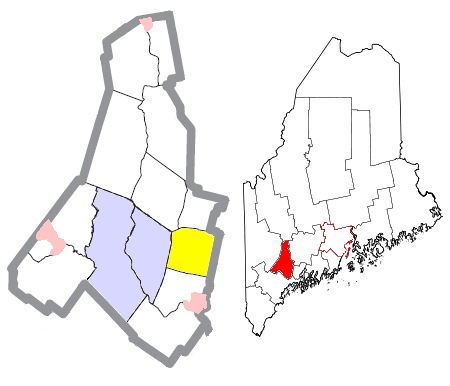
- Location of Sabattus (in yellow) in Androscoggin County and the state of Maine
- Coordinates: 44°06′43″N 70°05′30″W
- Country: United States
- State: Maine
- County: Androscoggin
- Villages: Sabattus; Robinson Corner; Webster Corner

Government
  - Type: Manager - Selectboard government
  - Body: Select board
  - Town Manager: Raquel Welch-Day
  - Town Clerk: Thomas Williams

Area
  - Total: 26.91 sq mi (69.70 km^{2})
  - Land: 25.71 sq mi (66.59 km^{2})
  - Water: 1.20 sq mi (3.11 km^{2})
- Elevation: 328 ft (100 m)

Population (2020)
  - Total: 5,044
  - Density: 196/sq mi (75.7/km^{2})
- Time zone: UTC-5 (Eastern (EST))
  - Summer (DST): UTC-4 (EDT)
- ZIP code: 04280
- Area code: 207
- FIPS code: 23-64570
- GNIS feature ID: 582704
- Town Meeting: May/June
- Municipal Election: November
- Website: sabattus.org

Sabattus (/səˈbætəs/, sə-BAT-əss) is a town in Androscoggin County, Maine, United States. The population was 5,044 at the 2020 census. It is included in both the Lewiston-Auburn, Maine Metropolitan Statistical Area and the Lewiston-Auburn, Maine Metropolitan New England City and Town Area. The town was formerly known as "Webster", and changed its name to "Sabattus" in 1971, in honor of a former Anasagunticook Indian chief. The village of Sabattus is in the northwestern corner of the town, at the outlet of Sabattus Pond.

== History ==
The town was set off from Lisbon, and incorporated as Webster on March 7, 1840. The name Sabattus comes from one of the chiefs of the Native American tribe that lived in the area. The tribe had moved on when the settlers came. The only parts of the town to bear the name Sabattus were the lake, river, and mountain. The spelling changed from Sabattis to the current spelling.

== Geography ==
According to the United States Census Bureau, the town has a total area of 26.91 square miles (69.70 km^{2}), of which 25.71 square miles (66.59 km^{2}) is land and 1.20 square miles (3.11 km^{2}) is water.

== Education ==
Sabattus is a part of the Regional School Unit 4 school district. Schools serving the city are:

- Oak Hill High School (9–12) – Wales
- Oak Hill Middle School (6–8) – Sabattus
- Carrie Ricker School (3–5) – Litchfield
- Libby Tozier School (Pre-K–2) – Litchfield

== Demographics ==
Historical population
Census	Pop.	Note	%±
1990	3,696		—
2000	4,486		21.4%
2010	4,876		8.7%
2020	5,044		3.4%
U.S. Decennial Census

=== 2010 census ===
As of the census of 2010, there were 4,876 people, 1,979 households, and 1,407 families living in the town. The population density was 189.7 inhabitants per square mile (73.2/km^{2}). There were 2,121 housing units at an average density of 82.5 per square mile (31.9/km^{2}). The racial makeup of the town was 97.4% White, 0.2% African American, 0.3% Native American, 0.3% Asian, 0.1% from other races, and 1.7% from two or more races. Hispanic or Latino people of any race were 1.0% of the population.

There were 1,979 households, of which 30.6% had children under the age of 18 living with them, 53.7% were married couples living together, 10.7% had a female householder with no husband present, 6.7% had a male householder with no wife present, and 28.9% were non-families. 20.8% of all households were made up of individuals, and 7.5% had someone living alone who was 65 years of age or older. The average household size was 2.46 and the average family size was 2.80.

The median age in the town was 42 years. 21.4% of residents were under the age of 18; 6.7% were between the ages of 18 and 24; 27.1% were from 25 to 44; 30.7% were from 45 to 64; and 14.1% were 65 years of age or older. The gender makeup of the town was 49.7% male and 50.3% female.

=== 2000 census ===
As of the census of 2000, there were 4,486 people, 1,708 households, and 1,298 families living in the town. The population density was 175.0 inhabitants per square mile (67.6/km^{2}). There were 1,843 housing units at an average density of 71.9 per square mile (27.8/km^{2}). The racial makeup of the town was 98.28% White, 0.11% African American, 0.29% Native American, 0.22% Asian, 0.11% from other races, and 0.98% from two or more races. Hispanic or Latino people of any race were 0.58% of the population.

There were 1,708 households, out of which 37.4% had children under the age of 18 living with them, 59.5% were married couples living together, 9.8% had a female householder with no husband present, and 24.0% were non-families. 17.6% of all households were made up of individuals, and 6.3% had someone living alone who was 65 years of age or older. The average household size was 2.61 and the average family size was 2.91.

In the town, the population was spread out, with 26.0% under the age of 18, 6.7% from 18 to 24, 33.5% from 25 to 44, 24.1% from 45 to 64, and 9.7% who were 65 years of age or older. The median age was 36 years. For every 100 females, there were 98.5 males. For every 100 females age 18 and over, there were 96.2 males.

The median income for a household in the town was $41,897, and the median income for a family was $45,984. Males had a median income of $33,105 versus $20,219 for females. The per capita income for the town was $17,451. About 1.5% of families and 2.8% of the population were below the poverty line, including 2.0% of those under age 18 and 3.2% of those age 65 or over.

Voter registration and party enrollment as of January 2015
Party	Total voters	Percentage
Unenrolled	1,487	40.0%
Democratic	1,150	31.0%
Republican	882	23.7%
Green Independent	198	5.3%
Total	3,717	100%

== Notable people ==
- Gleason Archer, Sr., founded Suffolk University and Law School
- PFC Roland L. Bragg, namesake of Fort Bragg
- Franklin Simmons, sculptor
