= Nepheline syenite =

Holocrystalline plutonic rock

- Igneous rock
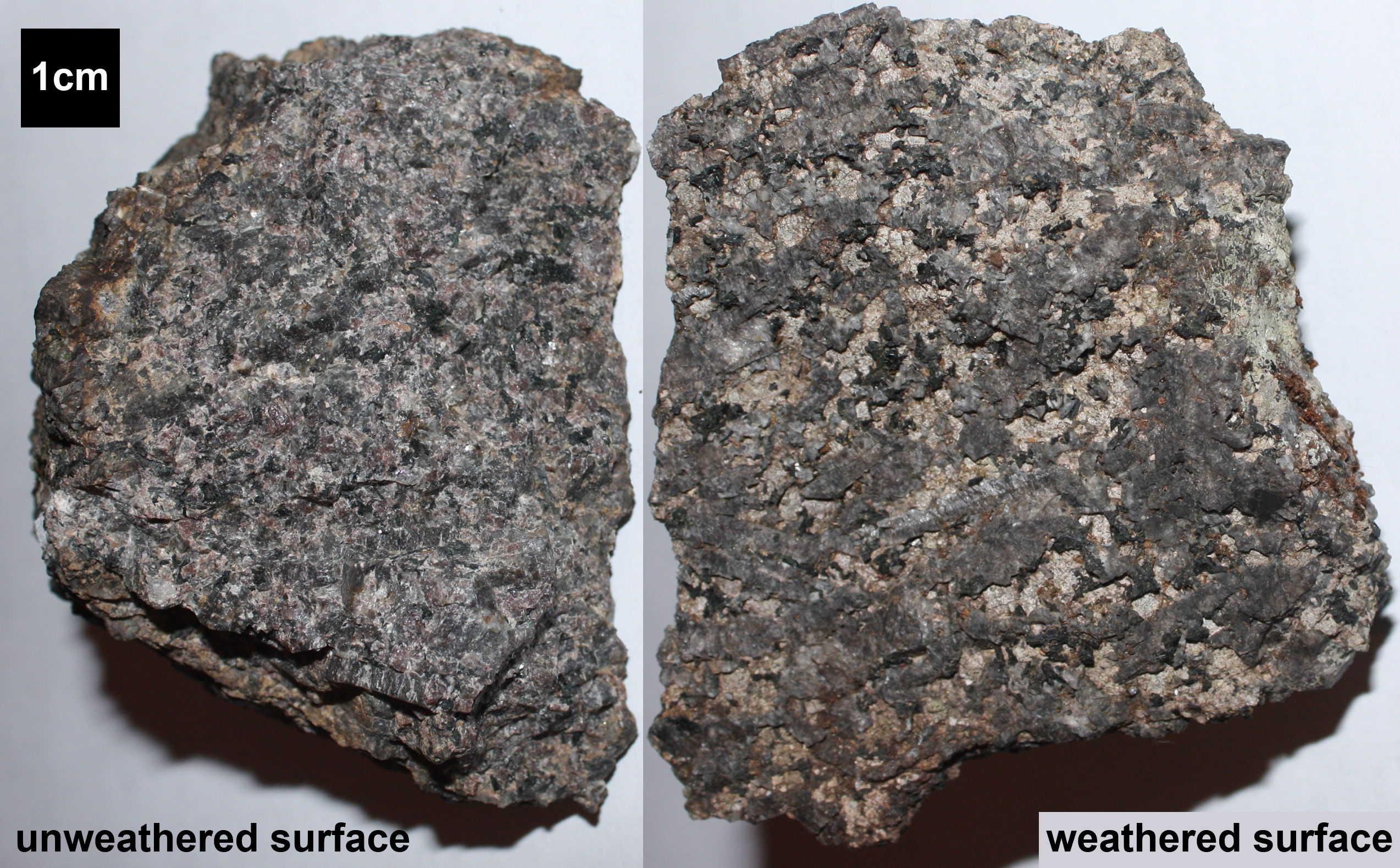
- Hand samples of nepheline syenite of the Ordovician Beemerville Complex, northern New Jersey

Composition
- Primary: alkali feldspar, nepheline, clinopyroxene, amphibole, biotite
- Secondary: magnetite, ilmenite, apatite, titanite

Nepheline syenite is a holocrystalline plutonic rock that consists largely of nepheline and alkali feldspar. The rocks are mostly pale colored, grey or pink, and in general appearance they are not unlike granites, but dark green varieties are also known. Phonolite is the fine-grained extrusive equivalent.

== Petrology ==
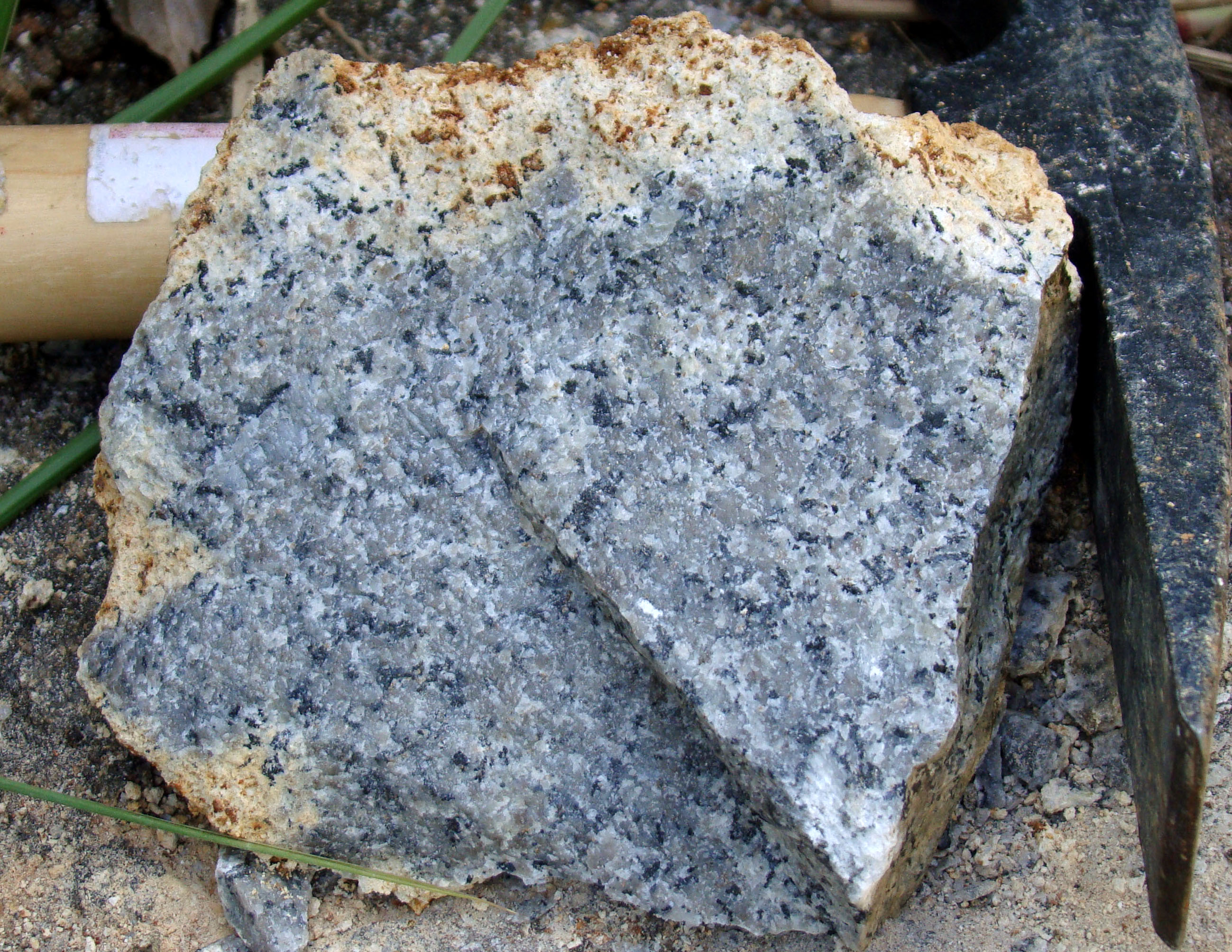
Nepheline syenite of the Intrusive Complex of Tanguá, State of Rio de Janeiro, Brazil (Motoki et al., 2011a)

Nepheline syenites are silica-undersaturated and some are peralkaline (terms discussed in igneous rock). Nepheline is a feldspathoid, a solid-solution mineral, that does not coexist with quartz; rather, nepheline would react with quartz to produce alkali feldspar.

They are distinguished from syenites not only by the presence of nepheline but also by the occurrence of many other minerals rich in alkalis and in rare earths and other incompatible elements. In nepheline syenites, alkali feldspar dominates, commonly represented by orthoclase and the exsolved lamellar albite, form perthite. In some rocks the potash feldspar, in others the soda feldspar predominates. Fresh clear microcline is very characteristic of some types of nepheline syenite.

Sodalite, colorless and transparent in thin section, but frequently pale blue in the hand specimens, is the principal feldspathoid mineral in addition to nepheline. Reddish-brown to black aenigmatite occurs also in these rocks. Extremely iron-rich olivine is rare, but is present in some nepheline syenite. Other minerals common in minor amounts include sodium-rich pyroxene, biotite, titanite, iron oxides, apatite, fluorite, melanite garnet, and zircon. Cancrinite occurs in several nepheline-syenites. A great number of interesting and rare minerals have been recorded from nepheline syenites and the pegmatite veins which intersect them.

== Macroscopic aspects ==
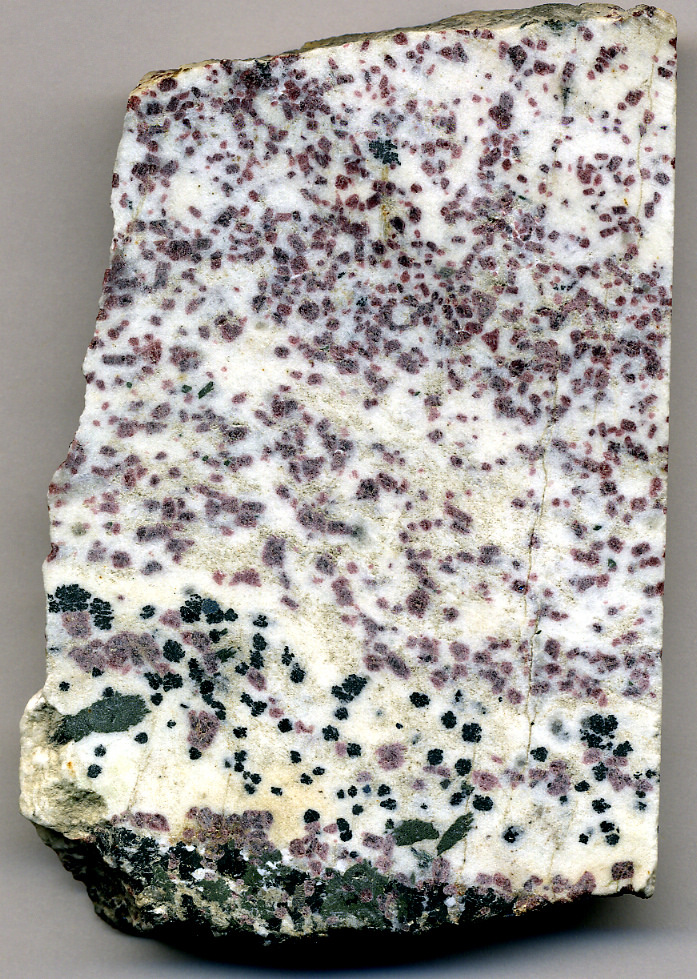
Kakortokite (eudialytic nepheline syenite) Kangerdluarssaq Fjord, far-southern Greenland. Slab is 9.5 cm tall.

Macroscopic aspects of nepheline syenite are similar to those of granite. The presence of nepheline and absence of quartz are the fundamental difference. Biotite is generally of low content and the main mafic minerals are clinopyroxene (±) and amphibole (±). The macroscopic colour is grey, being little darker than granite. There is high-grade metamorphic rock originated from nepheline syenite that is characterized by gneiss texture of very rare occurrence. It is called nepheline syenite gneiss or litchfieldite. An example is found at Canaã village, State of Rio de Janeiro, Brazil.

== Texture ==
The rock is holocrystalline, generally equigranular, equidirectional, and gross with grain size of 2 mm to 5 mm. In certain rare cases, the rock contains alkaline feldspar phenocrysts of 2 cm to 5 cm in length and 5 mm to 2 cm in thickness. The phenocrysts demonstrate orientation and eventually show cumulative texture.

== Mineral composition ==
The main minerals are alkali feldspar, nepheline, clinopyroxene (±), amphibole (±), and biotite (±). Nepheline is the main feldspathoid. Quartz and orthopyroxene are absent. According to the IUGS classification nomenclature (International Union of Geological Sciences, Streckeisen, 1978), nepheline syenite has 10% < F/(F + A + P) < 60% and P/(A + P) < 10% (where F – feldspathoids, A – alkali feldspar, and P – plagioclase volume fractions). Phonolite is the fine-grained equivalent. In case nepheline is less than 10%, the rock is called alkaline syenite with nepheline or pulaskite. The similar rock without quartz and nepheline is denominated alkaline syenite or syenite. Because of the presence of feldspathoids, nepheline syenite is classified to be a typical alkaline rock.

The alkaline feldspar is not potassic, but generally sodic-potassic, which is characterized by interlocking anorthoclase, called perthite. In the alkali feldspar almost pure albite domains are observed. Nepheline generally shows partial alteration into natrolite and cancrinite. The clinopyroxene is sodic whose composition varies from hedenbergite to aegirine-augite. This mineral eventually presents resorption shape. The reaction rim constituted by amphibole and/or biotite is commonly observed. The amphibole is of high alkali, such as alkaline hornblende and riebeckite. The alkaline clinopyroxene and amphibole are characteristics of typical alkaline rocks. Biotite is annite, with high Fe/Mg ratio.

The accessory minerals are magnetite, ilmenite, apatite, and titanite. Eventually, sodalite is found along hydrothermal fractures. Different from granite, zircon is rare and, if present, it is as xenocrysts. On the other hand, nepheline syenite gneiss contains abundant and large zircon crystals.

== Genesis ==
Silica-undersaturated igneous rocks typically are formed by low degrees of partial melting in the Earth's mantle. Carbon dioxide may dominate over water in source regions. Magmas of such rocks are formed in a variety of environments, including continental rifts, ocean islands, and supra-subduction positions in subduction zones. Nepheline syenite and phonolite may be derived by crystal fractionation from more mafic silica-undersaturated mantle-derived melts, or as partial melts of such rocks. Igneous rocks with nepheline in their normative mineralogy commonly are associated with other unusual igneous rocks such as carbonatite.

== Distribution ==
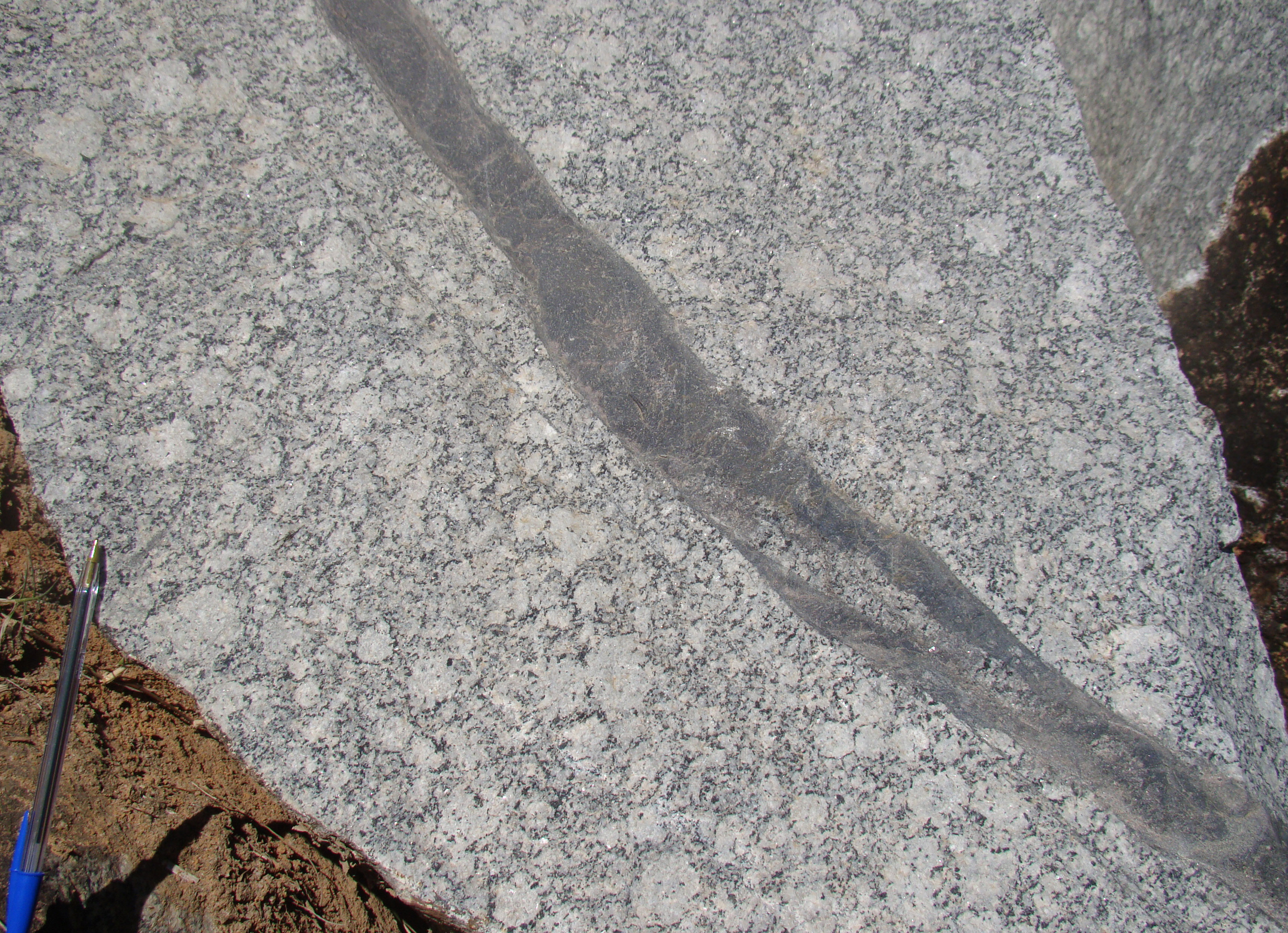
Pseudoleucite nepheline syenite of the Intrusive Complex of Morro de São João, State of Rio de Janeiro, Brazil (Motoki et al., 2011b)

Nepheline syenites and phonolites occur, for example, in Brazil, Canada, Cameroon, China, Greenland, Italy, Norway, the Pyrenees, Sweden, the Transvaal region, the Ural Mountains, in the USA Magnet Cove igneous complex of Arkansas, the mountains of the Central Montana Alkali Province, and as well as on oceanic islands.

Phonolite lavas formed in the East African rift in particularly large quantity, and the volume there may exceed the volume of all other phonolite occurrences combined, as discussed by Barker (1983).

Nepheline-normative rocks occur in close association with the Bushveld Igneous Complex, possibly formed from partial melting of the wall rocks to that large ultramafic layered intrusion.

Nepheline syenites are rare; there is only one occurrence in Great Britain (Loch Borralan) and one in France and Portugal. They are known also in Bohemia and in several places in Norway, Sweden and Finland. In the Americas these rocks have been found in Texas, Arkansas, New Jersey (Beemerville Complex) and Massachusetts, also in Ontario, British Columbia and Brazil. South Africa, Madagascar, India, Tasmania, Timor and Turkestan are other localities for the rocks of this series.

Rocks of this class also occur in Brazil (Serra de Tingua) containing sodalite and often much augite, in the western Sahara, on the Îles de Los (Guinea), and the Cape Verde Islands; also at Zwarte Koppies in the Transvaal, Madagascar, São Paulo in Brazil, Paisano Pass in West Texas, United States, and Montreal, Quebec, Canada. The rock of Salem, Massachusetts, United States, is a mica-foyaite rich in albite and aegirine: it accompanies granite and essexite. Litchfieldite is another well-marked type of nepheline-syenite, in which albite is the dominant feldspar. It is named after Litchfield, Maine, United States, where it occurs in scattered blocks. Biotite, cancrinite and sodalite are characteristic of this rock. A similar nepheline-syenite is known from Hastings County, Ontario, and contains hardly any orthoclase, but only albite feldspar. Nepheline is very abundant and there is also cancrinite, sodalite, scapolite, calcite, biotite and hornblende. The lujaurites are distinguished from the rocks above described by their dark color, which is due to the abundance of minerals such as augite, aegirine, arfvedsonite and other kinds of amphibole. Typical examples are known near Lujaur on the White Sea, where they occur with umptekites and other very peculiar rocks. Other localities for this group are at Julianehaab in Greenland with sodalite-syenite; at their margins they contain pseudomorphs after leucite. The lujaurites frequently have a parallel-banding or gneissose structure. Sodalite-syenites in which sodalite very largely or completely takes the place of nepheline occur in Greenland, where they contain also microcline-perthite, aegirine, arfvedsonite and eudialyte.

Cancrinite syenite, with a large percentage of cancrinite, has been described from Dalekarlia, Sweden and from Finland. Urtite from Lujaur Urt on the White Sea consists very largely of nepheline, with aegirine and apatite, but no feldspar. Jacupirangite (from Jacupiranga in Brazil) is a blackish rock composed of titaniferous augite, magnetite, ilmenite, perofskite and nepheline, with secondary biotite.

== Nomenclature ==
There is a wide variety of silica-undersaturated and peralkaline igneous rocks, including many informal place-name varieties named after the locations in which they were first discovered. In many cases these are plain nepheline syenites containing one or more rare minerals or mineraloids, which do not warrant a new formal classification. These include;

Foyaite: foyaites are named after Foya in the Serra de Monchique, in southern Portugal. These are K-feldspar-nepheline syenites containing <10% ferromagnesian minerals, usually pyroxene, hornblende and biotite.

Laurdalite: The laurdalites, from Laurdal in Norway, are grey or pinkish, and in many ways closely resemble the larvikites of southern Norway, with which they occur. They contain anorthoclase feldspars, biotite or greenish augite, much apatite and in some cases, olivine.

Ditroite: Ditroite derives its name from Ditrau, Transylvania, Romania. It is essentially a microcline, sodalite and cancrinite variety of nepheline syenite. It contains also orthoclase, nepheline, biotite, aegirine, acmite.

== Chemical composition ==
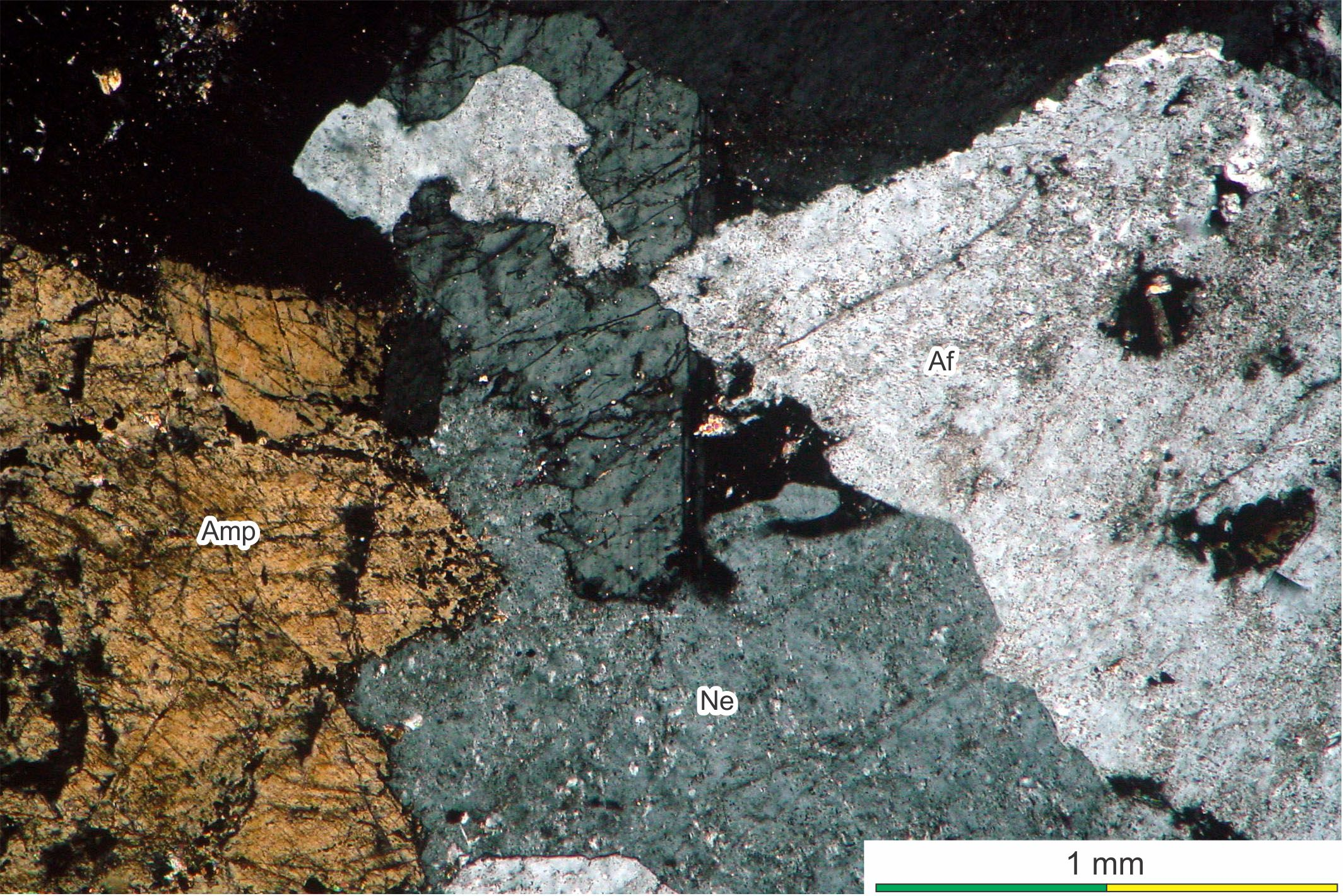
Thin section image of the nepheline syenite of the Intrusive Complex of Tanguá, State of Rio de Janeiro, Brazil (Motoki et al., 2011a)

The chemical peculiarities of the nepheline-syenites are well marked. They are exceedingly rich in alkalis and in alumina (hence the abundance of felspathoids and alkali feldspars), with silica varying from 50 to 56%, while lime, magnesia and iron are never present in great quantity, though somewhat more variable than the other components. A worldwide average of the major elements in nepheline syenite tabulated by Barker (1983) is listed below, expressed as weight percent oxides.

Nepheline syenite is characterized by high ratio of (Na_{2}O+K_{2}O)/SiO_{2} and (Na_{2}O+K_{2}O)/Al_{2}O_{3}, which are represented respectively by the existence of nepheline and alkaline mafic minerals. Therefore, it is classified geochemically as alkaline rock. This rock has low Fe and Mg contents, in total about 3wt%, and in this sense it is classified to be felsic rock. However, the SiO_{2} content is not so high, being 53% to 62wt%, which is equivalent to andesite and diorite. In this sense, it corresponds to intermediate rock. Light rare-earth elements are highly concentrated, indicating that the magma is highly differentiated.

- SiO_{2}: 54.99%
- TiO_{2}: 0.60%
- Al_{2}O_{3}: 20.96%
- Fe_{2}O_{3}: 2.25%
- FeO: 2.05%
- MnO: 0.15%
- MgO: 0.77%
- CaO: 2.31%
- Na_{2}O: 8.23%
- K_{2}O: 5.58%
- H_{2}O: 1.47%
- P_{2}O_{5}: 0.13%

The normative mineralogy of this average composition contains about 22% nepheline and 66% feldspar.

Because nepheline syenite lacks quartz and is rich in feldspar and nepheline, it is used in the manufacturing of glass and ceramics.

== Applications ==
Industrial use of nepheline syenite includes refractories, glass making, ceramics and, in pigments and fillers. In these applications the nepheline syenite is ground and dark minerals are carefully separated leaving a mixture of primarily feldspar and nepheline. This mixture is higher in alkali and aluminium and typically lower in iron and silica than feldspars from pegmatites making it a good raw material. In 1994 production of nepheline syenite in Canada and Norway, the largest producing countries, was 600,000 tonnes and 330,000 tonnes respectively.

Requirements for nepheline syenite as a raw material for glass manufacturer include:

- Al_{2}O_{3} >23%; >14% Na_{2}O + K_{2}O; Fe_{2}O_{3} <0.1%,
- Absence of refractory minerals.
- Coarsely ground, typically -40# to +200# mesh.

The typical mineralogical and chemical analysis of a ceramic grade nepheline syenite are:

Country	Norway
Producing company	Sibelco
Albite, %	11
Microcline, %	48.5
Analcime, %	0.6
Nepheline , %	39.8
SiO_{2}, %	55.7
Al_{2}O_{3}, %	24.5
Fe_{2}O_{3}, %	0.1
TiO_{2}, %	-
CaO, %	1.1
MgO, %	-
K_{2}O, %	8.8
Na_{2}O, %	8.2
LOI, %	-
