= Sabattus (CDP), Maine =

Sabattus, Maine
- Census-designated place
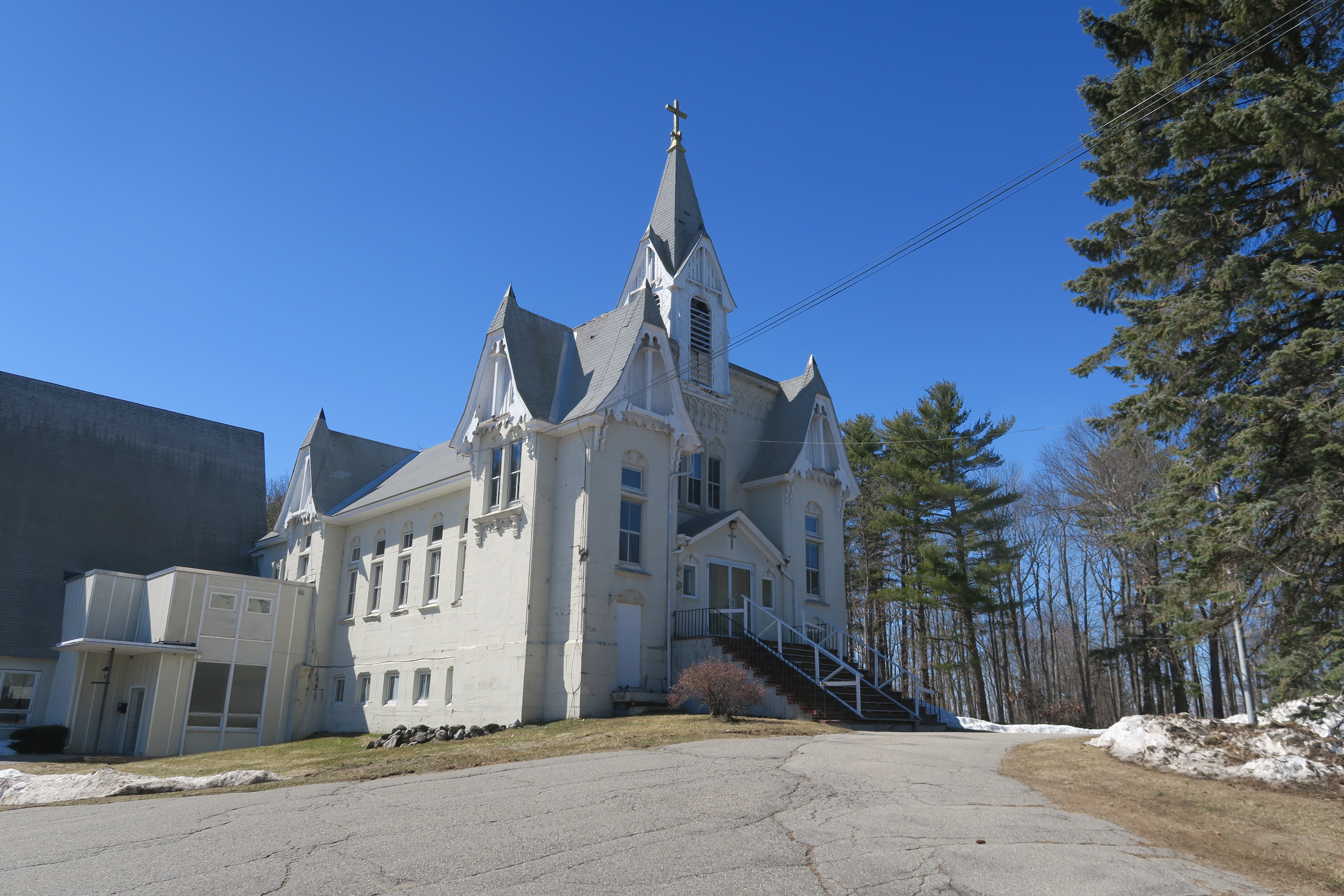
- Our Lady of the Rosary, Prince of Peace Parish

- Location within Maine Location within the United States
- Coordinates: 44°07′27″N 70°06′21″W
- Country: United States
- State: Maine
- County: Androscoggin
- Town: Sabattus

Area
  - Total: 1.12 sq mi (2.91 km^{2})
  - Land: 0.70 sq mi (1.82 km^{2})
  - Water: 0.42 sq mi (1.09 km^{2})
- Elevation: 246 ft (75 m)

Population (2020)
  - Total: 787
  - Density: 1,120.1/sq mi (432.47/km^{2})
- Time zone: UTC-5 (Eastern (EST))
  - Summer (DST): UTC-4 (EDT)
- ZIP Code: 04280
- Area code: 207
- FIPS code: 23-64535
- GNIS feature ID: 2806274

Sabattus is a census-designated place (CDP) comprising the primary village in the town of Sabattus, Androscoggin County, Maine, United States. It is situated in the northwestern corner of the town, at the outlet of Sabattus Pond and the start of the Sabattus River, a southward-flowing tributary of the Androscoggin River. Maine State Route 126 forms the southern edge of the CDP; the highway leads west 6 miles (10 km) to the center of Lewiston and northeast 20 miles (32 km) to Gardiner. State Route 9 runs south from Sabattus 9 miles (14 km) to Lisbon Falls and follows Route 126 northeast to Gardiner.

Sabattus was first listed as a CDP prior to the 2020 census.

== Demographics ==
Historical population
Census	Pop.	Note	%±
2020	787		—
U.S. Decennial Census
