= Wales Airport =

Wales Airport may refer to:

- Wales Airport (Alaska) in Wales, Alaska, United States (FAA: IWK)
- Wales Airport (Maine) in Wales, Maine, United States (FAA: ME6)
- Cardiff International Airport in Cardiff, Wales, United Kingdom (IATA: CWL, ICAO: EGFF)
