= Herb Mitchell (actor) =

American actor (1937–2011)

- circa 1979
- Born: Herbert L. Mitchell Jr. June 18, 1937; Bar Harbor, Maine, USA
- Died: January 4, 2011 (aged 73); Blue Hill, Maine, USA
- Other name: Herb L. Mitchell
- Occupation: Actor
- Spouses: Scarlet Lynda Kinney; Janet Ahearn
- Children: 5

Herbert L. Mitchell Jr. (June 18, 1937 – January 4, 2011), credited as Herb Mitchell and sometimes Herb L. Mitchell, was an American actor, director, and teacher. He was a stockbroker before he made the switch to acting, appearing in films; stage plays such as The Fiddler on the Roof, in which he played the lead role of Tevye; television shows including The Practice, on which he had a recurring role; and commercials, including ones for stock brokerage firms Dean Witter Reynolds and Paine Webber.

== Early life ==
Herb Mitchell was born June 18, 1937, in Bar Harbor, Maine. He was one of three sons of Herbert L. Mitchell Sr. and Estella Mae Bourgeois Mitchell. He grew up in Bar Harbor, where he attended local schools, served as an altar boy in the local Catholic church, and participated in high school sports. Following studies at the University of Maine and the Maine Maritime Academy, he became a stockbroker in Bangor, Maine.

== Acting career ==
In the late 1960s, Mitchell joined a community theater group in Ellsworth, Maine, the Ellsworth Players; he eventually became its president. He was purely a behind-the-scenes participant in the group's stage productions until 1971, when director Bill Raiten persuaded him to take the role of Tevye in a production of the musical Fiddler on the Roof. His portrayal won praise, including a favorable review by playwright Samuel A. Taylor. A New York City producer who saw the show offered Mitchell a chance to play the same role in an off-Broadway production of the musical in Brooklyn. Mitchell, as the father of four children, felt committed to his financial career and declined the offer. However, he continued to act in local productions in the following years, became disenchanted with his job, and decided to pursue acting as a profession.

During the 1970s, he became co-owner of a jazz club and bar that operated seasonally in Maine; he spent the off-season acting on stage in southern California. He auditioned for the television series M*A*S*H (1972–83) without success. By 1980, he was working in Los Angeles as an actor, appearing in films, television programs, live performances, and commercials. He portrayed roles in commercials for stock brokerage firms Dean Witter, as the company spokesman, and Paine Webber, as an executive.

In 1992, while living in Los Angeles, Mitchell bought a home in Blue Hill, Maine. In the early 1990s, he operated the Company of CharActors Theatre, which performed stage plays, one of which he directed, in Studio City, California. In the 1993 film Gettysburg, set during the American Civil War (1861–65), he portrayed the real-life Union Army flag bearer Sergeant Andrew Jackson Tozier. In the early to mid-2000s, he survived three cancers and then moved back to Blue Hill with his family, where he semi-retired while occasionally appearing in local stage productions.

He reprised his role as Tevye in Fiddler on the Roof in May 1990 and August 2006, again directed by Raiten. He appeared in the television courtroom drama series The Practice (1997–2004) as the recurring character Judge Rodney White. In August 2006 he appeared at Ellsworth High School, in Ellsworth, Maine, as Eddie Carbone in a production of Arthur Miller's play A View from the Bridge. Over the years, he was mentored in singing by Sheldon Bisberg, "his longtime musical collaborator".

== Personal life and death ==
Mitchell was the father of four children with his first wife, Scarlett Kinney, and one daughter with his second wife, Janet Ahearn. At the time of his death he also was a grandfather of four. On January 4, 2011, he died in the Blue Hill home of his daughter Kathy and her husband.

== Selected appearances ==
Films

- Sam's Son (1984) as Coach Diener
- Breakin' 2: Electric Boogaloo (1984) as Stanley
- Tuff Turf (1985) as Mr. Russell
- Scorpion (1986) as Los Angeles International Airport: Dr. Ghys
- Innerspace (1987) as Camera Store Clerk
- Big Man on Campus (1989) as Captain Summers
- There Goes the Neighborhood (1992) as Mr. Bratesman
- Gettysburg (1993) as Sergeant Andrew Jackson Tozier (the actual Tozier was in his 20s at the time of war)
- The Last Seduction (1994) as Bob Trotter
- Drive (1997) as Trooper #1
- Against the Law (1997) as Carl Stensgard
- Surface to Air (1998, direct-to-video) as General Davis
- Back to Even (1998, direct-to-video) as Des
- Austin Powers: The Spy Who Shagged Me (1999) as Sergeant Simpson
- Chain of Command (2000) as Admiral Harrington
- Ali (2001) as Boxing Commissioner
- Gods and Generals (2003) as Union Officer (uncredited)

Television films

- Pray TV (1982)
- Life of the Party: The Story of Beatrice (1982)
- Desire, the Vampire (1982)
- Baby Sitter (1983)
- Do You Remember Love (1985)
- On Fire (1987)
- Daddy (1987)
- What Price Victory (1988)
- The Preppie Murder (1989)
- Lies Before Kisses (1991)
- Switched at Birth (1991)
- A Murderous Affair: The Carolyn Warmus Story (1992)
- Empty Cradle (1993)
- Menendez: A Killing in Beverly Hills (1994)
- Abandoned and Deceived (1995)
- Norma Jean & Marilyn (1996)
- Silk Hope (1999)
- Santa and Pete (1999)
- Hefner: Unauthorized (1999)
- Chain of Command (2000)

Television

- Dean Witter commercials (1980s–90s) as Spokesman – now called Dean Witter Reynolds
- Paine Webber commercials (circa 1980s-90s) as Executive
- The Practice (1997–2004) as Judge Rodney White – recurring role in the television series (final television appearance)

Others

- Fiddler on the Roof (1971, 1990, 2006) as Tevye – theatrical productions
- A View from the Bridge (2006) as Eddie Carbone – high school production
