= David C. Burr =

American businessperson and politician (1783–1827)

Member of the Maine House of Representatives
- In office 1820–1827

Personal details
- Born: April 21, 1783
- Died: November 7, 1827 (aged 44)
- Profession: businessperson and politician

David Cudworth Burr (April 21, 1783 – November 7, 1827) was an American businessperson and politician from Maine. Burr served in the Massachusetts House of Representatives from 1816–1817 prior to Maine's statehood. He also served in the Maine House of Representatives from its founding in 1820 until his death in November 1827. He represented Litchfield, Maine. Burr served as a delegate to both constitutional conventions held in Portland during his political career.

Prior to settling in Litchfield, Burr lived in nearby Gardiner, Maine, where he served on the town's school board from 1809 to 1810.

Burr was the youngest of twelve children by his parents Jonathan Burr and Martha (Cudworth) Burr. On his mother's side, he was the descendant of Plymouth Colony resident James Cudworth.
