= Henry I. Emerson =

American politician

Henry Ivory Emerson
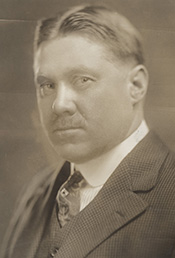

Member of the U.S. House of Representatives from Ohio's 22nd district
- In office March 4, 1915 – March 3, 1921
- Preceded by: New district
- Succeeded by: Theodore E. Burton

Personal details
- Born: March 15, 1871 Litchfield, Maine
- Died: October 28, 1953 (aged 82) East Cleveland, Ohio
- Resting place: Lake View Cemetery
- Party: Republican
- Spouse(s): Nettie Naumann; Lillian McCormick
- Education: Cincinnati Law School

Henry Ivory Emerson (March 15, 1871 – October 28, 1953) was a U.S. representative from Ohio.

Born in Litchfield, Maine, Emerson moved with his parents to Lewiston, Maine, where he attended the public schools and studied law. He moved to Cleveland, Ohio, in 1892 and was graduated from the Cincinnati Law School in 1893. He was admitted to the bar the same year and commenced practice in Cleveland, Ohio. He served as member of the Cleveland City Council in 1902 and 1903.

Emerson was elected as a Republican to the Sixty-fourth, Sixty-fifth, and Sixty-sixth Congresses (March 4, 1915 – March 3, 1921). He was an unsuccessful candidate for renomination in 1920. He resumed the practice of law. He died in East Cleveland, Ohio, October 28, 1953. He was interred in Lake View Cemetery, Cleveland, Ohio.

Emerson married Nettie Naumann at Cleveland, December 25, 1894. She died August 15, 1913, and Emerson remarried to Lillian McCormick, originally from Ontario, February 19, 1917. Emerson was a Methodist member.

== Sources ==
- United States Congress. "Henry I. Emerson (id: E000171)". Biographical Directory of the United States Congress.

U.S. House of Representatives
Preceded by New district	Member of the U.S. House of Representatives from Ohio's 22nd congressional district 1915-1921	Succeeded by Theodore E. Burton
