= Litchfieldite =

Igneous rock

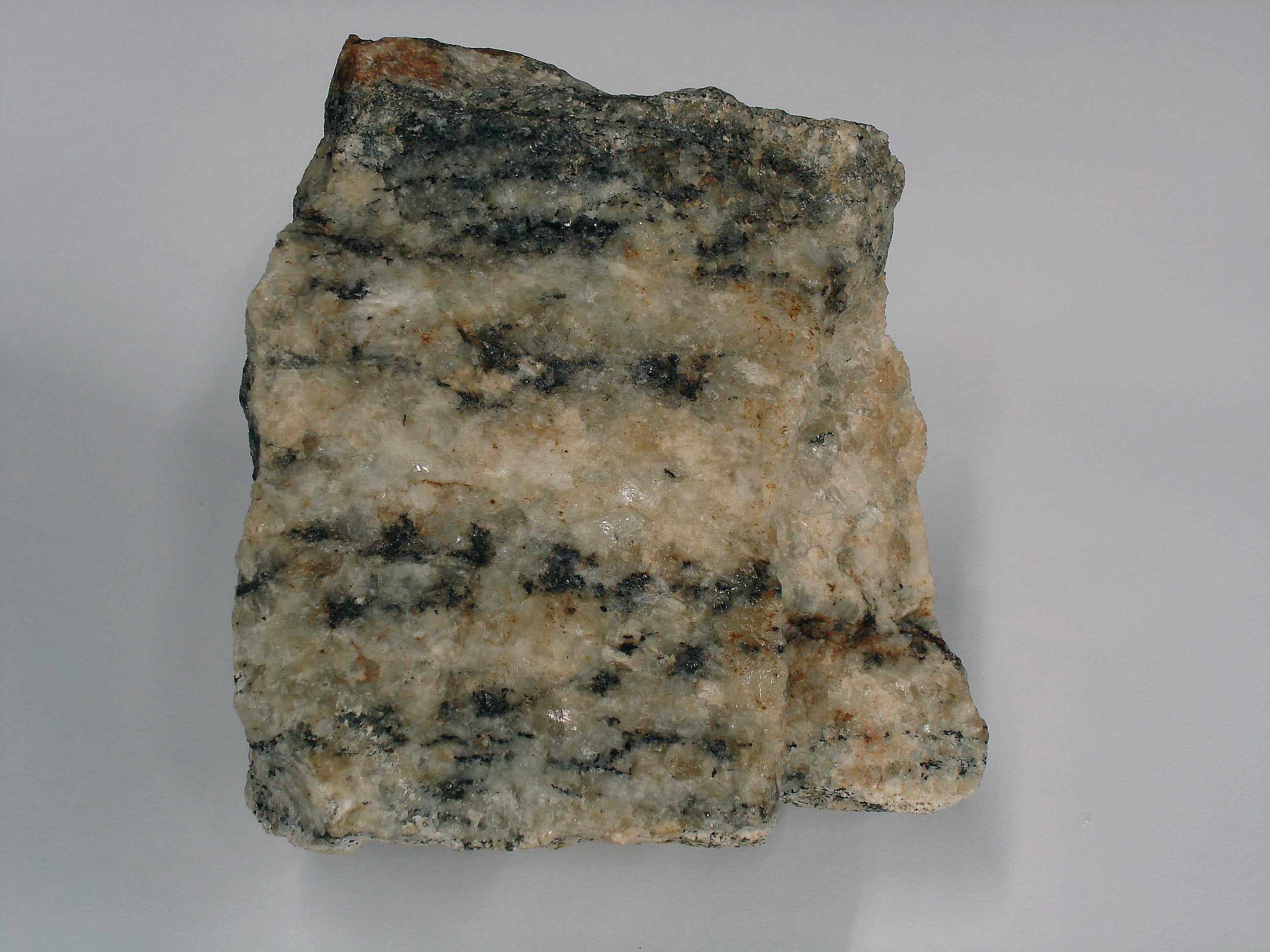
Litchfieldite (nepheline syenite gneiss) from Canaã Massif, Brazil

Litchfieldite is a rare igneous rock. It is a coarse-grained, foliated variety of nepheline syenite, sometimes called nepheline syenite gneiss or gneissic nepeheline syenite. Litchfieldite is composed of two varieties of feldspar (mostly albite but also some microcline), with nepheline, sodalite, cancrinite and calcite. The mafic minerals, when present, are magnetite and an iron-rich variety of biotite (lepidomelane).

== Occurrence ==
The rock was named after its occurrence at Litchfield, Maine, USA, by Bayley in 1892.

It is a very rare rock and also occurs in Blue Mountain and French River, Canada; Soroy and Val River, Norway; Cevadais, Portugal; Canaã, Boca Nova, Itajú da Colonia and Peixes, Brazil.

== Petrology ==
Besides the mineral composition, litchfieldites are characterized by one or more of the following structures:

- A gneissic appearance due to the alternation of leucocratic and mafic bearing mineral bands;
- A foliated appearance, due to preferred orientation of platey minerals like lepidomelane biotite,
- Parallel orientation of the optical axis of minerals like nepheline.
- Occurrence within zoned bodies, enveloped by amphibole bearing syenites and quartz-syenites rocks,
- Broken and/or bent twin lamellae in plagioclase (albite),
- Mortar structure,
- Biotite with kink banding structure and bent cleavage planes,
- Occurrence as large boudin or scattered blocks at the surface,
- Occurrence within metamorphic belt as elongated bodies parallel to the regional structures,
- Isotopic age according to the regional metamorphism

== Origin ==
There are two hypotheses for the origin of these rocks:

1) A pre-tectonic magmatic nepheline syenite
2) A synorogenic intrusion of nepheline syenite

Both schools of thought are in accordance that rocks like litchfieldite owe their mineral and structural characteristics to the metamorphism.

== Economy ==
Due to the content of alkali elements and alumina, they are very important ore for the glass industry. The iron-bearing minerals when present are strongly magnetic and can be removed through a magnetic field.

== Occurrences of nepheline syenite gneisses in Brazil ==
=== Boca Nova ===
- Location: Pará State
- Age and determination method
  - Country rock last metamorphism age: 900 to 600 my (Brazilian cycle)
  - Nepheline syenite rocks: 580+/-10 my- K-Ar, biotite; 724 +/- 30 my- Rb-Sr, whole-rock
- Rocks and minerals presents (between parenthesis when accessory)
  - Alkaline rocks
    - nepheline syenite gneiss (mainly litchfieldite): nepheline, albite, microcline, perthite, dark green biotite, (calcite), (white mica), (zircon), (pyrochlore), (cancrinite), (sodalite), (opaque minerals)
    - Pegmatites-the same mineralogical composition but poorer in biotite.
  - Country rocks: Phyllite, schist with subordinated granite
- Metamorphic grade of country rock: High greenschist facies to medium amphibolite facies
- Geometry of the alkaline body :Boulders scattered. Geophysical dates suggests elongated bodies parallel to the regional structures.
- Textures and structures presents in alkaline rocks: Gneissose appearance; folded foliation; foliation parallel to the country rocks; preferential orientation of biotites parallel to the gneissic band; pegmatites veins with pinch and swell structure parallel and cross cutting the foliation; biotite crystal with kink banding structure; plagioclase with bent twin lamella; feldspar with peristherite; oriented optical axis in nephelines;
- Proposed origin: metamorphism of igneous nepheline syenite

=== Canaã ===
- Localization: Rio de Janeiro State
- Age and determination method
  - Country rocks last metamorphism age: 900 to 600 my (Brazilian cycle)
  - Nepheline syenite rocks: 542 +/-14 my Rb-Sr whole rock; 424 +/- 13 my K-Ar in biotite.
- Rocks and minerals (between parenthesis when accessory):
  - Alkaline rocks:
    - Litchfieldites: Albite (An=5%), microcline, nepheline, cancrinite, lepidomelane, magnetite, (zircon), (allanite), (corundum), (sodalite)
    - Alkali syenite: microcline perthite, quartz, pyroxene, brown biotite, (amphibole), (titanite), (apatite), (zircon), (muscovite), (corundum), (molybdenite), (opaques)
    - Nepheline bearing pegmatite vein, parallel and cross cutting the foliation of litchfieldite: Feldspar, nepheline, (magnetite), (biotite), (muscovite), (sodalite), (sulfides), (calcite).
    - Syenite pegmatite: feldspar, corundum, muscovite, (biotite), (blue corundum), (sulfides)
  - Country rocks: Biotite-sillimanite-gneiss, amphibolites, migmatites, (granite).
- Metamorphic grade of country rock: high amphibolite facies
- Geometry of the alkaline body: elongated and concordant bodies
- Textures and structures presents in alkaline rocks: gneissose appearance, parallel to the country rock foliation; oriented biotite and feldspar; plagioclase with bent twin lamella; kink-banding biotite; oriented optical axis in nephelines; zoned bodies-litchfieldite in center and syenites surrounding.
- Proposed origin: metamorphism of igneous nepheline syenite.

=== Tocantins nepheline syenite gneiss belt ===
(Estrela, Eldorado, Porto Nacional, Peixe)

- Localization: Tocantins State
- Age and determination method:
  - Country rocks last metamorphism age: 900 to 600 my (Brazilian cycle)
  - Nepheline syenite rocks: 1,5 Gy
- Rocks and minerals (between parenthesis when accessory):
  - Alkaline rocks:
    - Litchfieldite: nepheline, microcline, albite, amphibole, pyroxene, (molybdenite), (garnet), (titanite), (pyrochlore), (corundum), (sodalite).
    - Syenite and quartz-syenites:
    - Alkaline pegmatites: albite, nepheline, pyroxene, magnetite, zircon, (pyrochlore), (monazite), (allanite), (corundum).
  - Country rocks: granitic gneisses, amphibolites
- Metamorphic grade of country rock: high amphibolite
- Geometry of the alkaline body: A belt of elongated zoned bodies parallel to the regional structures.
- Textures and structures presents in alkaline rocks: gneissose appearance, foliation, preferred orientation of biotite crystals, faults, boudinage, plagioclase with bent twin lamella; feldspar with peristherite, plagioclase with undulose extinction.
- Proposed origin: Metamorphism and metasomatism of igneous nepheline syenite rocks.

=== Alkaline Rocks Province of South Bahia ===
(Itaju da Colonia, Santa Cruz da Vitória, Potiriguá, Itabuna)

- Localization: Bahia State
- Age and determination method:
  - Country rocks last metamorphism age: 900 to 600 my (Brazilian cycle)
  - Nepheline syenite rocks: 732 +/- 8 my, U-Pb, titanite
- Rocks and minerals (between parenthesis when accessory):
  - Alcalines rocks:
    - Litchfieldite: albite, microcline, nepheline, dark green biotite, brown biotite, (pyroxene), (amphibole), (cancrinite), (sodalite)
    - Tawite: albite, microcline, sodalite, (nepheline)
    - Syenite
    - Alkaline pegmatites
  - Country rocks: granitic gneiss, migmatite, granulite
- Metamorphic grade of country rock: High amphibolite facies
- Geometry of the alkaline body: elongated bodies parallel to regional structures.
- Textures and structures present in alkaline rocks: elongated and oriented cluster (schlieren) of mafic minerals, plagioclase with bent and broken twin lamella, biotite and muscovite orientation (foliation), mortar structures, kink-banding in biotite
- Proposed origin: Metamorphic synorogenic alkaline rocks.
