= Chain of Command (2000 film) =

Film by John Terlesky

- British DVD cover from 2006
- Written by: T. L. Lankford
- Directed by: John Terlesky
- Starring: Roy Scheider; Patrick Muldoon; Michael Biehn
- Music by: Joseph Stanley Williams
- Country of origin: United States
- Original language: English

Production
- Executive producer: Lisa Hansen
- Producers: Paul Hertzberg; John Paul Pettinato
- Cinematography: Maximo Munzi
- Editor: Daniel Duncan
- Running time: 96 min.
- Production company: CineTel Films

Original release
- Network: HBO
- Release: July 22, 2000

Chain of Command is a 2000 political thriller TV film, produced by Cinetel Films and starring Roy Scheider and Patrick Muldoon. It premiered on HBO in July 2000.

== Plot ==
New Secret Service agent Mike Connelly, assigned to protect President-elect Jack Cahill, becomes uneasy having to protect a person who is having an affair with a friend's wife. Connelly feels even worse about it after preventing an assassination attempt aboard Cahill's plane where a flight attendant is accidentally killed in the process. Sensing Connelly's discomfort around Cahill, his boss reassigns him to the team that protects the "nuclear football" as soon as Cahill becomes president.

In the film, the "nuclear football" briefcase contains a high-tech laptop computer, which can only be operated through a two key system (one key operated by the president and the other by the agent on "football duty") along with thumbprint and eye retina scans from the President. In real life, the football still uses paper playbooks and an officer of the military guards/carries the football.

After the newly inaugurated president has been planning a meeting with Fung, the President of Taiwan, to discuss the strained relationship between Taiwan and the People's Republic of China, one of the Secret Service agents returns home to find that his family is being held hostage by some men who are later revealed to be Fung's henchmen. They force him to participate in a plot to steal "the football". When Presidents Cahill and Fung are in Taiwan aboard Fung's ship, the latter insists that he feels that peaceful co-existence with mainland China may no longer be possible and that drastic action must be taken to ensure China does not invade Taiwan. Soon afterwards, Fung's henchmen begin killing all the other agents, leaving Mike Connelly as the only loyal Secret Service agent left.

Fung's men, along with Fung's girlfriend Iris, are successful in stealing the football, and Fung forces Cahill to activate it (by knocking him unconscious to get his thumbprint and eye retina scans), explaining that he will use the US's ICBMs to launch a nuclear strike on China. He hopes that this will lead a revolution among his people towards "a new beginning" of Taiwanese freedom, pointing out that since he alone controls all of the US's missiles, he would not have to worry about a mutually assured destruction of both China and the United States. Only the United States should worry when China retaliates.

Meanwhile, Vice President Valdez is informed of the situation and Fung makes a phone call to her explaining that he has seized control of the United States' nuclear missiles and will launch one against Beijing unless both China and the United States within 24 hours recognize Taiwan's independence and that the United States promises to use its full military might against China if it tries to invade Taiwan. Valdez insists that this would never be possible and later Fung follows through with his threat, launching a first strike against Beijing using an ICBM from Nebraska.

Valdez first contacts the President of Russia to assure that the missile is not targeted towards Russia. Then Valdez contacts Chairman Tzu of China to explain the situation and that the United States did not launch the missile and is therefore not responsible. She also offers to give Tzu the chance to shoot the missile out of the sky but Tzu angrily points out that this would be impossible. It is then that he gives the order to launch a retaliatory strike against the United States using one of China's ICBMs, which he calls "an eye for an eye". True to his word, the missile is targeted for Washington, D.C.

After Beijing and later Washington are destroyed, Tzu launches a second strike using several of China's missiles as further retaliation for the destruction of China's capital. Meanwhile, Iris is revealed to Agent Connelly to be an undercover Chinese agent whose assignment was to recover the football and return it to Beijing. But even she had no idea Fung would actually launch missiles against her country, and points out that China would no doubt retaliate against the US in response to the attack, thus she points out now they both have a common interest. Together they are able to escape Fung's ship and follow Fung and the still kidnapped President to Hong Kong. They are both ultimately successful in taking out all but one of Fung's henchmen, all of which are rogue elements of the People's Liberation Army. The last remaining one strangles Iris to death however and continues his search for Agent Connelly.

Meanwhile, Connelly finds President Cahill held at gunpoint by Fung who still has the football. Fung along with Agent Thornton orders Connelly to surrender or else either Fung or Thornton will kill the President. It is then Cahill says for Connelly to "remember your duty". Fung at first thinks he means the duty of protecting the President, but then Connelly points out that he is on football duty and that it's "some other guy's job" to protect the President. Connelly shoots the President in the leg which shocks Fung and distracts him just long enough to allow Connelly to take him and Agent Thornton out. Connelly and President Cahill now are in control of the football and begin the process of deactivating it. The last of Fung's henchmen however, is able to fatally wound the President before Connelly can take him out. But not before President Cahill is successfully able to deactivate the football. By doing so, Vice President Valdez and NORAD have regained control of the United States' nuclear arsenal.

Valdez gives this news to Chairman Tzu and says that he may now order the destruction of his missiles. Tzu refuses, thinking Valdez is bluffing. Valdez then gives the order to NORAD that "Stage One is a go", which Tzu is horrified to find out is in fact a launch of several of the US's ICBMs. Valdez warns Tzu has one minute to destroy his missiles, and if he does, Valdez will destroy her missiles and points out to Tzu that he does not want to know what "Stage Two" is. Just when it seems all hope is lost however, Tzu complies with Valdez's instructions and destroys all his missiles which soon afterwards Valdez does the same with hers. Thus a major nuclear war was narrowly averted. At the end of the film, it has been implied that Valdez was elevated to the presidency, giving a speech to the American people about the challenges that go with her new responsibilities. She reminds them not to lose hope.

== Main cast ==
- Roy Scheider as President Jack Cahill
- Patrick Muldoon as Secret Service Agent Mike Connelly
- María Conchita Alonso as Vice President Gloria Valdez
- Michael Biehn as Secret Service Agent Craig Thornton
- Ric Young as President Ken Fung
- Sung Hi Lee as Iris
- William R. Moses as Secret Service Agent Gary Phillips
- Tom Wright as Secret Service Agent Burke
- Philip Tan as Wu
- Michael Mantell as David Lehmann
- Byron Field as Lieutenant Southern
- John Putch as Secret Service Agent Joe Lambert
- Pat Skipper as Secret Service Agent Ellroy
- Francis Maikai as Ting
- Herb Mitchell as Admiral Harrington
- Michael Yama as Chairman Tzu
- Susan Blakely as Meg Danforth
- John Capodice as Cameron Ellis
- Kim Roberts as Stephanie Ellis
- Richard Yniguez as Michael Valdez
- John Beck as General Peterson (uncredited)
