= Sabattus River =

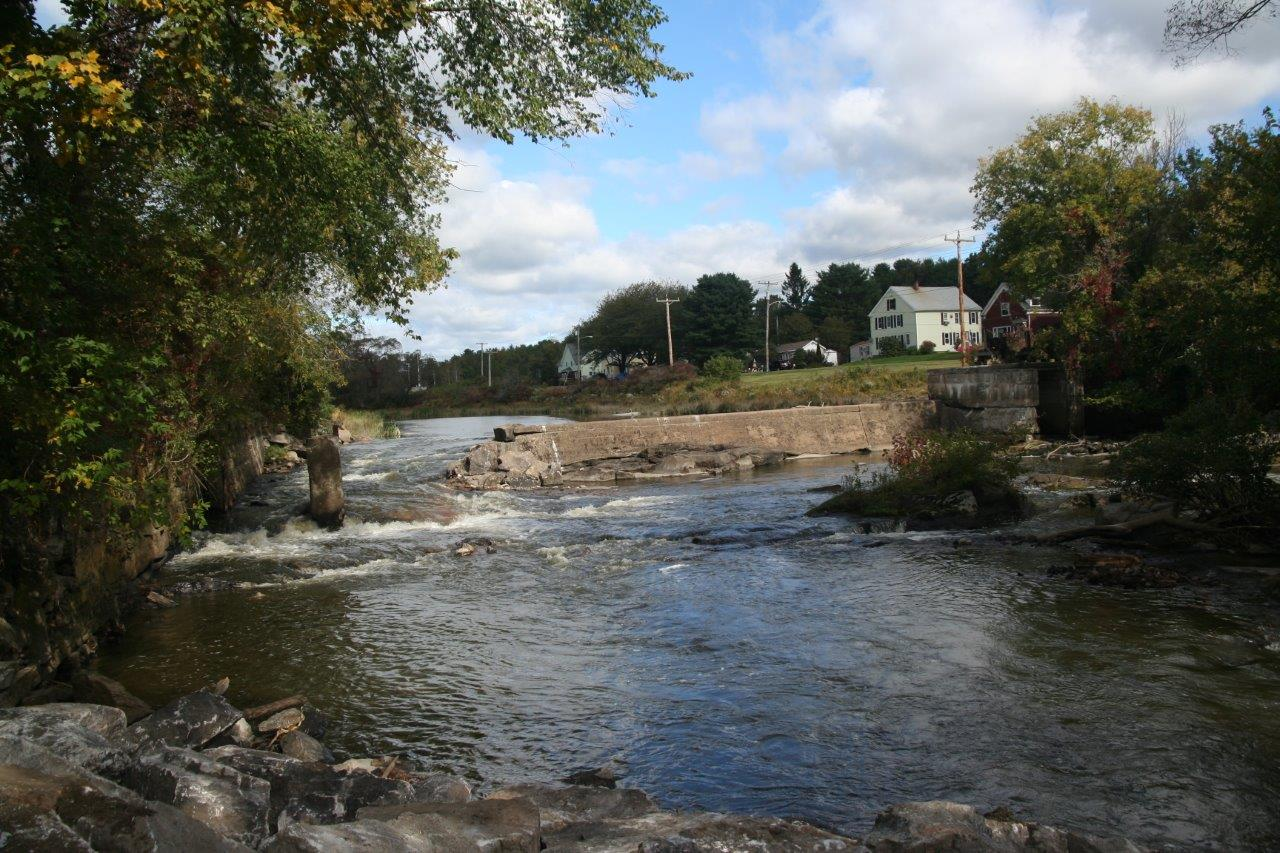
- Sabattus River in Lisbon, Maine

Location
- Country: United States

Physical characteristics
- Source
  - location: Maine

The Sabattus River is an 11.4-mile-long (18.3 km) tributary of the Androscoggin River in Maine. It rises at the outlet of Sabattus Pond in the town of Sabattus and flows south into the town of Lisbon, reaching the Androscoggin just southeast of Lisbon Center and about 1.5 miles (2.4 km) upstream (northwest) of Lisbon Falls. Via the Androscoggin River, water from the Sabattus River flows to the Kennebec River at Merrymeeting Bay and ultimately to the Atlantic Ocean.

== Sabattus Pond ==
Sabattus Pond
- Location within Maine
- Coordinates: 44°07′N 70°06′W
- Max. length: 3.9 mi (6.3 km)
- Max. width: 1,400 yards (1,300 m)
- Surface area: 1,973 acres (798 ha)
- Max. depth: 19 feet (5.8 m)
- Water volume: 21,939 acre⋅ft (27,061,000 m^{3})
- Surface elevation: 236 ft (72 m)

Sabattus Pond is the largest lake on the Sabattus River. The pond extends northward from a dam in the northwestern corner of Sabattus along the town line between Greene to the west and Wales to the east. The Androscoggin Railroad was built along the eastern shore of the pond in 1861. The abandoned railroad grade has subsequently been developed, with shoreline residences and seasonal cabins west of Maine State Route 132. Poor water quality from extensive shoreline development has eliminated historic populations of rainbow smelt and smallmouth bass. Remaining angling opportunities for chain pickerel and white perch have been augmented by introducing largemouth bass. Northern Pike is the main fishery with an annual ice fishing Pike derby that have had specimens over 40 inches and 20 pounds being reported.

== See also ==
- List of rivers of Maine
