= Oak Hill High School (Maine) =

Location
- 56 School Road; Wales, Androscoggin, Maine 04280; United States
- 44°08′07″N 70°03′24″W

Information
- School district: Regional School Unit 4
- Principal: Marco Alberti, Sue Reny
- Teaching staff: 34.20 (FTE)
- Grades: 9-12
- Age range: 14-22
- Enrollment: 408 (2023–2024)
  - Grade 9: 115
  - Grade 10: 96
  - Grade 11: 107
  - Grade 12: 90
- Average class size: 15
- Student to teacher ratio: 11.93
- Language: English
- Hours in school day: 7
- Colors: Red, white, and blue
- Athletics conference: Class C
- Sports: Soccer, Football, Field Hockey, Golf, Fall Cheering, Basketball, Wrestling, Winter Cheering, Baseball, Softball, Lacrosse, Ice Hockey, Tennis, Cross Country
- Mascot: Raccoon
- Team name: The Raiders
- Rivals: Lisbon High School
- Budget: $2.5M
- Communities served: Wales, Sabattus, Litchfield
- Website: www.oakhillhigh.info

Oak Hill High School is a high school located in Wales, Maine, United States. A part of Regional School Unit 4, this regional high school serves students from the towns of Sabattus, Litchfield, and Wales. The mascot is the Raider, represented by a raccoon. The school is located on Oak Hill at an elevation of 632 feet.

== History ==
Oak Hill High School opened in 1976 on Oak Hill in Wales, Maine. Before it opened, students in the three towns attended Monmouth Academy.

In 1994, a new wing with six classrooms, offices, and a courtyard was constructed. Before the addition, the school relied on portable classrooms to meet its space needs.

When the school opened it was served by well water. Eventually, a total of seven wells were dug, but all ran dry and none could meet the school's needs. By 2018, only two wells were active and were not supplying enough water to meet the building's needs and the school was forced to dismiss students early. By 2019, the school was connected to the Sabattus Water District.

In 2025, the Maine Supreme Judicial Court heard three appeals on October 8 at the school as part of the courts' tradition of hearing cases in public high schools.

== Curriculum ==
Oak Hill High School's curriculum includes English, French, Latin, math, science, social studies, and physical education. The school also offers business, health, art, music, and industrial arts.

== Extracurricular activities ==
The school has several extracurricular activities, including:

- Civil Rights Team
- Drama Club
- Future Business Leaders of America (FBLA), in 2023 the Oak Hill High School FBLA team won the state title for the 25th consecutive year
- French Club
- Academic Decathlon, which competes at the annual United States Academic Decathlon
- Ski and Snowboard Club, an eight-week winter program held at the Lost Valley Ski Area in Auburn
- Olympia Snowe Women's Leadership Institute
- Robotics

== Sports ==
The school offers a variety of sports, covering the fall, winter, and spring seasons.

Fall sports include:

- Football, the program won three consecutive Class D titles in 2013, 2014, and 2015, the first team to do so since Orono High School in 1981
- Boys/girls soccer
- Cheering
- Cross country
- Running
- Golf
- Field hockey

Winter sports include:

- Boys/girls basketball
- Wrestling as a co-op with Lisbon High School
- Ice hockey
- Winter cheering

Spring sports include:

- Baseball
- Softball
- Boys/girls lacrosse
- Track (at Lisbon High School)
- Girls tennis

== Notable faculty and alumni ==
- Roger Fuller, state legislator
- Randall Greenwood, state legislator
- Avery Yale Kamila, journalist
- Jennifer Wilcox, chemical engineer
- Stephen J. Wood, state legislator

== See also ==
- Education in Maine
- Litchfield Academy
