= Tacoma Lakes =

Chain of lakes in Maine, USA

The Tacoma Lakes are a chain of lakes located in Litchfield, Maine and Monmouth, Maine. The Tacoma Lakes are made up of Bunker Pond, Jimmy Pond, Little Purgatory Pond, Sand Pond, and Woodbury Pond.

== History ==
Historically, the lakes were known as the Purgatory Ponds. Purgatory Village is near Woodbury Pond. The dam in Purgatory Village was used to power grist mills and saw mills. By 1850, the Androscoggin and Kennebec Railroad crossed through Litchfield near the Tacoma Lakes. In 1862, the railroad merged with the Penobscot and Kennebec Railroad to form the Maine Central Railroad. At the junction of Woodbury Pond and Sand Pond the railway established the Tacoma Inn, in operation from 1908 to 1932. In 1915, the Tacoma Inn hosted the High Diving White Horses, named King and Queen, who jumped from a high platform into Sand Pond. The Tacoma Lakes Association, formerly the Tacoma Lakes Improvement Association, is a membership organization of lakeside property owners.

== Wildlife ==
The Tacoma Lakes support a diversity of wildlife, including beavers. Birds spotted on the lakes and along its shores include: common loons, pileated woodpeckers, chickadees, nuthatches, crows, blue jays, cormorants, mallard ducks, black ducks, ospreys, great blue herons, turkey vultures, and Canada geese.

== Woodbury Pond ==
Woodbury Pond is the largest of the Tacoma Lakes. Woodbury Pond is connected to Sand Pond and Little Purgatory Pond. It covers 513 acres with a maximum water depth of 62 feet. The perimeter of Woodbury Pond is 9.5 miles.

=== Woodbury Pond Park ===
The town of Litchfield opens Woodbury Pond Park, on Woodbury Pond, from May to August each summer. The park is located at 320 Whippoorwill Road. The public park provides a beach, playground, picnic tables, and grills. In 2025, daily entrance fees were $3 for adults and $2 for children. A group called Friends of Woodbury Pond Park helps maintain the park and beach.

=== Public boat launch ===
The public boat launch on the lakes is located on Whippoorwill Road. The boat launch is on Woodbury Pond.

== Sand Pond ==
Sand Pond is connected to Woodbury Pond and Bunker Pond. Sand Pond covers 279 acres with a maximum water depth of 82 feet. The perimeter of Woodbury Pond is 6.1 miles.

== Bunker Pond ==
Bunker Pond is connected to Sand Pond and Jimmy Pond. Bunker Pond covers 78 acres with a maximum water depth of 28 feet. The perimeter of Bunker Pond is 1.6 miles.

== Little Purgatory Pond ==
Little Purgatory Pond is connected to Woodbury Pond. Little Purgatory Pond covers 65 acres with a maximum water depth of 20 feet. The perimeter of Little Purgatory Pond is 1.7 miles.

== Jimmy Pond ==
Jimmy Pond is connected to Bunker Pond. Jimmy Pond covers 51 acres with a maximum water depth of 32 feet. The perimeter of Jimmy Pond is 1.3 miles.

== Sites of interest ==
There are many historical sites and sites of interest on the Tacoma Lakes.

- A former retreat for nuns on Bunker Pond that was built in 1900 with five bedrooms and a private chapel.
- Woodbury Pond Dam controls the outlet of Woodbury Pond.
