= Monmouth, Maine =

Town in Maine, United States

- Town
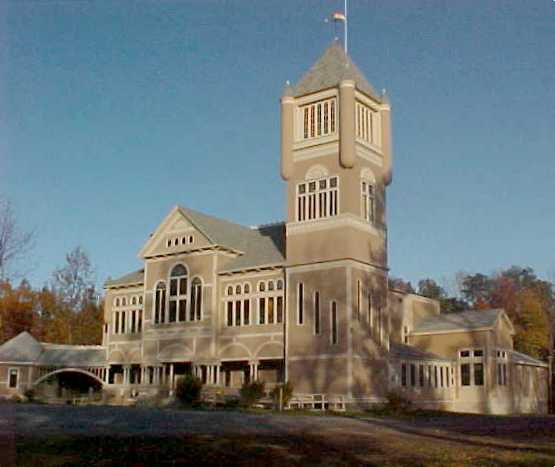
- Cumston Hall

- Logo
- Motto(s): "A Better Place to Live and Work"
- Location in Kennebec County and the state of Maine.
- Coordinates: 44°15′38″N 70°00′43″W
- Country: United States
- State: Maine
- County: Kennebec
- Incorporated: 1792
- Villages: Monmouth; East Monmouth; North Monmouth; South Monmouth; Tacoma

Area
  - Total: 39.04 sq mi (101.11 km^{2})
  - Land: 34.03 sq mi (88.14 km^{2})
  - Water: 5.01 sq mi (12.98 km^{2})
- Elevation: 308 ft (94 m)

Population (2020)
  - Total: 4,066
  - Density: 119.5/sq mi (46.13/km^{2})
- Time zone: UTC-5 (Eastern (EST))
  - Summer (DST): UTC-4 (EDT)
- ZIP Codes: 04259 (Monmouth); 04265 (North Monmouth)
- Area code: 207
- FIPS code: 23-46405
- GNIS feature ID: 582601
- Website: monmouthmaine.gov

Monmouth is a town in Kennebec County, Maine, United States. Monmouth is included in the Lewiston-Auburn, Maine metropolitan New England City and Town Area. The population was 4,066 at the 2020 census. A popular summer resort area with many lakeside cottages, Monmouth is part of the Winthrop Lakes Region.

== History ==
Part of the Plymouth Patent, it was first settled as Freetown in 1776–1777 by families from Brunswick. It would also be called Bloomingborough and Wales before being incorporated by the Massachusetts General Court on January 20, 1792, as Monmouth, after Monmouth, New Jersey. The name was suggested by landowner General Henry Dearborn, who had fought in the Battle of Monmouth on June 28, 1778.

Monmouth was considered one of the best agricultural towns in the state, producing hay, apples and potatoes, in addition to beef cattle and dairy products. It also had excellent sites for watermills. By 1859, when the population was 1,925, it had two factories for making boot-webbing and binding, a shovel and hoe factory, a tannery, a machine shops, some mechanic shops, some wood turning shops, a sleigh and carriage factory, some boot and shoe shops, a carpet factory, and a sash, blind and door factory. In 1849, the Androscoggin & Kennebec Railroad (later part of the Maine Central Railroad) opened to the town.

== Geography ==
According to the United States Census Bureau, the town has a total area of 39.04 square miles (101.11 km^{2}), of which 34.03 square miles (88.14 km^{2}) is land and 5.01 square miles (12.98 km^{2}) is water.

Monmouth is drained by Jug Stream, Jock Stream, Mud Mills Stream and Wilson Stream, Monmouth has access to Lakes Cobbosseecontee, Annabessacook, Cochnewagon, and the Tacoma Lakes.

The town is crossed by U.S. Route 202 and state routes 126, 132 and 135.

== Demographics ==
Historical population
Census	Pop.	Note	%±
1800	701		—
1810	1,262		80.0%
1820	1,590		26.0%
1830	1,879		18.2%
1840	1,882		0.2%
1850	1,925		2.3%
1860	1,854		−3.7%
1870	1,744		−5.9%
1880	1,520		−12.8%
1890	1,362		−10.4%
1900	1,236		−9.3%
1910	1,386		12.1%
1920	1,372		−1.0%
1930	1,344		−2.0%
1940	1,500		11.6%
1950	1,683		12.2%
1960	1,884		11.9%
1970	2,062		9.4%
1980	2,888		40.1%
1990	3,353		16.1%
2000	3,785		12.9%
2010	4,104		8.4%
2020	4,066		−0.9%
U.S. Decennial Census

=== 2010 census ===
As of the census of 2010, there were 4,104 people, 1,577 households, and 1,174 families living in the town. The population density was 120.6 inhabitants per square mile (46.6/km^{2}). There were 2,021 housing units at an average density of 59.4 per square mile (22.9/km^{2}). The racial makeup of the town was 97.9% White, 0.3% African American, 0.2% Native American, 0.1% Asian, 0.1% from other races, and 1.5% from two or more races. Hispanic or Latino of any race were 1.2% of the population.

There were 1,577 households, of which 34.3% had children under the age of 18 living with them, 59.8% were married couples living together, 10.1% had a female householder with no husband present, 4.6% had a male householder with no wife present, and 25.6% were non-families. 17.8% of all households were made up of individuals, and 7.1% had someone living alone who was 65 years of age or older. The average household size was 2.59 and the average family size was 2.93.

The median age in the town was 42 years. 23.2% of residents were under the age of 18; 7% were between the ages of 18 and 24; 24.4% were from 25 to 44; 33.7% were from 45 to 64; and 11.7% were 65 years of age or older. The gender makeup of the town was 48.6% male and 51.4% female.

=== 2000 census ===
As of the census of 2000, there were 3,785 people, 1,435 households, and 1,077 families living in the town. The population density was 111.0 inhabitants per square mile (42.9/km^{2}). There were 1,801 housing units at an average density of 52.8 per square mile (20.4/km^{2}). The racial makeup of the town was 100.00% White, 0.20% African American, 0.42% Native American, 0.16% Asian, 0.03% from other races, and 0.58% from two or more races. Hispanic or Latino of any race were 0.69% of the population.

There were 1,435 households, out of which 39.0% had children under the age of 18 living with them, 61.0% were married couples living together, 10.0% had a female householder with no husband present, and 24.9% were non-families. 20.0% of all households were made up of individuals, and 7.9% had someone living alone who was 65 years of age or older. The average household size was 2.63 and the average family size was 3.00.

In the town, the population was spread out, with 27.6% under the age of 18, 6.2% from 18 to 24, 31.7% from 25 to 44, 24.4% from 45 to 64, and 10.0% who were 65 years of age or older. The median age was 38 years. For every 100 females, there were 94.5 males. For every 100 females age 18 and over, there were 92.1 males.

The median income for a household in the town was $43,906, and the median income for a family was $47,616. Males had a median income of $32,034 versus $22,885 for females. The per capita income for the town was $17,551. About 9.6% of families and 9.2% of the population were below the poverty line, including 11.5% of those under age 18 and 17.0% of those age 65 or over.

== Education ==
The town is home to the Monmouth Academy.

== Divisions ==
- North Monmouth
- South Monmouth
- East Monmouth
- Monmouth Center

== Points of interest ==
- Cumston Hall, location of the Theater at Monmouth. Cumston Hall was donated in 1900.

== Notable people ==
- John Chandler, US congressman and senator; soldier
- Henry Dearborn, Revolutionary War era general
- James R. Flynn, songwriter
- Oliver Otis Howard, Civil War General, attended Monmouth Academy
- Benjamin White Norris, US congressman
- Charles Dormon Robinson, painter
- Samuel Thurston, pioneer, lawyer, politician
- Henry P. Torsey, educator and politician
- Andrew Jackson Tozier, Civil War soldier, Medal of Honor recipient
