= Randall Greenwood =

American politician

The Honorable

Member of the Maine House of Representatives from the 56th district
- Incumbent
- Assumed office December 7, 2022
- Preceded by: Richard Mason

Member of the Maine House of Representatives from the 82nd district
- In office December 2020 – December 7, 2022
- Preceded by: Kent Ackley

Member of the Maine House of Representatives from the 82nd district
- In office December 2014 – December 2016
- Succeeded by: Kent Ackley

Personal details
- Party: Republican
- Children: 3
- Education: Bachelor of Science
- Alma mater: University of Southern Maine

Randall Greenwood is an American politician who has served as a member of the Maine House of Representatives for four non-consecutive terms. He grew up in Wales, Maine.

== Electoral history ==
He was first elected to the 82nd district in the 2014 Maine House of Representatives election. He lost in the 2016 Maine House of Representatives election to Kent Ackley. He lost to him again in the 2018 Maine House of Representatives election. He won back the seat in the 2020 Maine House of Representatives election. He was redistricted into the 56th district in the 2022 Maine House of Representatives election.

In 2024, Greenwood argued in favor of maintaining home rule and local control and against passing a bill to prohibit cities and towns from adopting moratoriums on homeless shelter construction.

== Biography ==
Greenwood grew up on a 100 head dairy farm in Wales, Maine. He graduated from Oak Hill High School in 1991. He earned a Bachelor of Science from the University of Southern Maine in business management in 2012. Greenwood is the former owner of a nightclub. He currently serves on the town of Wales Board of Selectmen and as the town's general assistance administrator.

Greenwood has three children and lives on a farm with goats and chickens.
