= Andrew J. Tozier =

Medal of Honor recipient and US Civil War Sergeant

- Born: February 11, 1838; Monmouth, Maine
- Died: March 28, 1910 (aged 72); Litchfield, Maine
- Military career
- Allegiance: United States of America; Union
- Branch: United States Army; Union Army
- Service years: 1861–1865
- Rank: First Sergeant
- Units: 2nd Maine Infantry; 20th Maine Infantry
- Conflicts: American Civil War: Battle of Gaines Mill; Battle of Fredericksburg; Battle of Gettysburg
- Awards: Medal of Honor

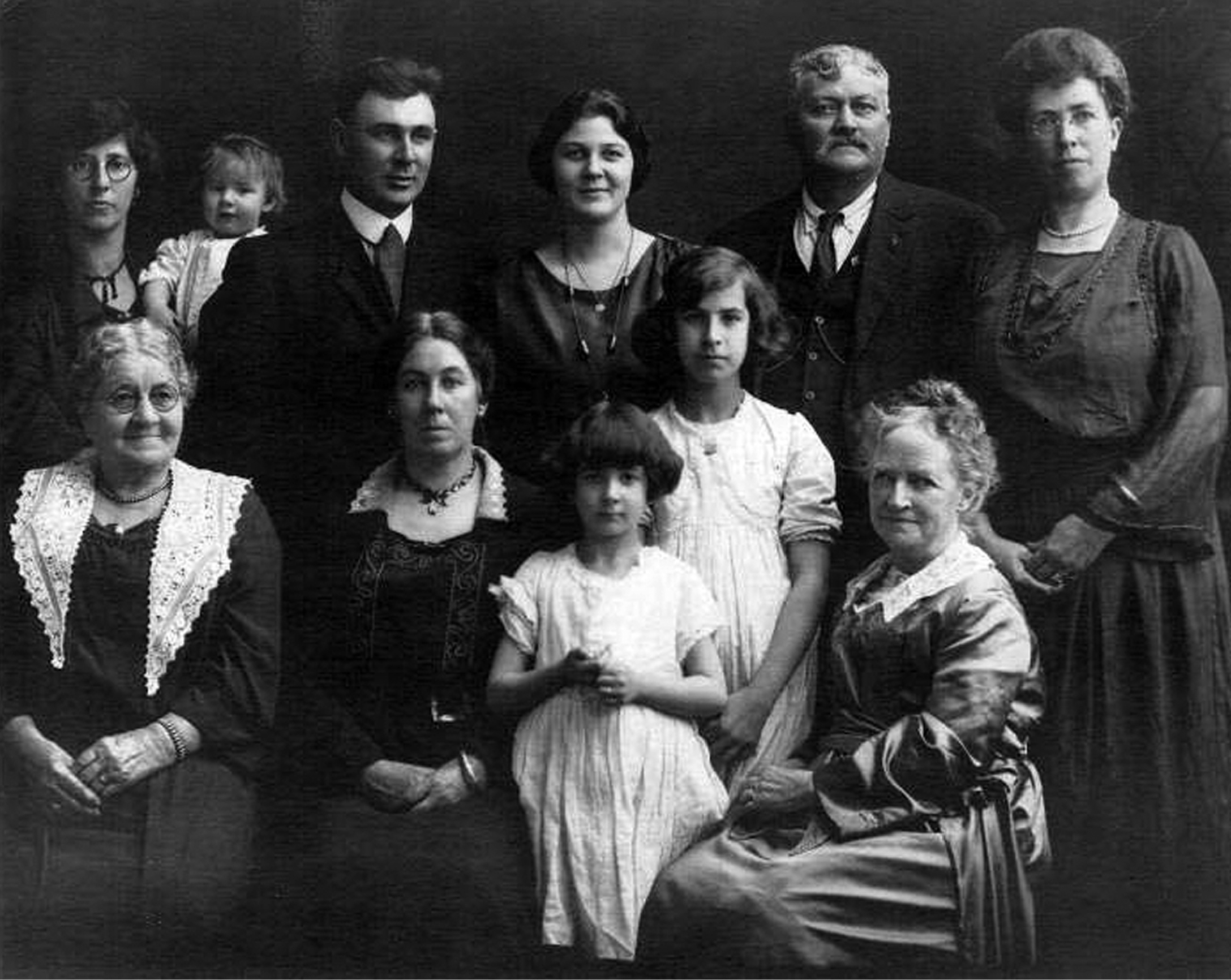
Family of Andrew Jackson Tozier

Andrew Jackson Tozier (February 11, 1838 – March 28, 1910) was a first sergeant in the 2nd Maine Volunteer Infantry Regiment and later the color-bearer for the 20th Maine Volunteer Infantry Regiment who was awarded the Medal of Honor for his service at the Battle of Gettysburg during the American Civil War.

== Biography ==
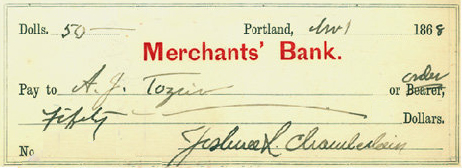
Bank draft from Joshua Chamberlain to Andrew Tozier

Born in the Purgatory area near the Monmouth/Litchfield line, Andrew was the fifth of seven children. When he was ten years old, he moved with his family to Plymouth, Maine, to be near relatives. His father, John H. Tozier, was an abusive alcoholic and Andrew ran away from home in his early teens.

In July 1861, Tozier returned home and enlisted from Plymouth in the 2nd Maine Infantry Regiment. In early 1862, he was promoted to corporal and at the Battle of Gaines' Mill, he was shot in the middle finger and the ankle. Tozier was captured when his regiment fell back, and a Confederate surgeon removed the finger and the bullet in his ankle the next day. Tozier was sent to Belle Isle prison in Richmond, Virginia and was paroled a few weeks later. In time, he returned to his regiment and in late May 1863, he was transferred to Company I of the 20th Maine.

A month later, Tozier became the color bearer of his new regiment on the march to Gettysburg when his predecessor, Sgt. Charles Proctor turned up drunk on the march and was arrested. Tozier was the most senior sergeant in the regiment owing to his previous service in the 2nd Maine, which dated back to 1861. As the senior enlisted man, the honor of bearing the regimental colors fell to him. During the battle on Little Round Top, Tozier stood at the center of the regiment with the regimental flag tucked in his right elbow while he used the rifle of a wounded member of the color guard to return fire on the attacking Confederates. At the conclusion of the fight, regimental commander Joshua Chamberlain offered Tozier a commission as a lieutenant, but Tozier declined.

Tozier was again wounded at the Battle of North Anna on May 26, 1864. This time, the bullet struck his head just behind his eye. Most of the bullet exited the skull, but a portion remained lodged inside. Despite this latest wound, he continued to serve until his original enlistment term expired on July 15, 1864.

== Criminal history ==
Tozier, along with Lewis Cushman, who was both his half-brother and his uncle, participated in a multi-year crime spree: stealing cattle, clothing, and other items across several Maine counties. On August 29, 1865, Tozier, Cushman, and an accomplice robbed the clothing store of Michael Larkin in East Livermore, Maine. On April 9, 1868, in Cherryfield, Maine, the two men stole six oxen and drove them to near the state capitol of Augusta before butchering them and selling the meat.

Tozier proved to be an elusive criminal. He was charged with crimes in three different counties but was acquitted in one and had the charges dismissed in another. In 1869, however, prosecutors had enough evidence of his guilt in the clothing store robbery—including the cooperation of Cushman who implicated Tozier—that he pled guilty and was sentenced to five years at hard labor in the state prison. Shortly after he was transferred to the prison, however, Tozier was pardoned of all crimes by the Governor of Maine, his former commander in the 20th Maine, Joshua Chamberlain.

In an effort to prevent Tozier from slipping back into a life of crime, Chamberlain made his release contingent on moving himself and his family to the Chamberlain estate. This would allow the governor to keep an eye on his former sergeant and provide the family with a steady income, with both Tozier and his wife working as personal assistants to the Governor and First Lady of Maine.

Tozier and his wife would give birth to a daughter during their time at the estate, naming her after Chamberlain's 13 year old daughter, Grace.

== Postwar years ==
After living with the Chamberlains for a few years, Tozier moved to Chebeague Island where he worked on a fishing vessel. Eventually, Tozier returned to his childhood home in Monmouth & Litchfield and tried his hand at dairy farming. Plagued by the physical effects of his many war wounds, Tozier worked when he could at a local rake and broom factory or at other odd jobs. He was also active in his local Grand Army of the Republic (GAR) post.

=== Medal of Honor ===
Tozier was issued the Medal of Honor on August 13, 1898, with the citation reading: "At the crisis of the engagement this soldier, a color bearer, stood alone in an advanced position, the regiment having been borne back, and defended his colors with musket and ammunition picked up at his feet."

The medal was likely destroyed when his son Andrew Jr.’s home in Farmingdale, Maine burned down.

== In popular culture ==
Tozier and the story of the 20th Maine are celebrated in The Ghost of Paul Revere's song "Ballad of the 20th Maine", from their album Field Notes Vol.1. The song became the official State Ballad of Maine in 2019. Tozier appears in the 1993 film Gettysburg, portrayed by actor Herb Mitchell.

== See also ==
- List of Medal of Honor recipients for the Battle of Gettysburg
- List of American Civil War Medal of Honor recipients: T–Z
