= North Monmouth, Maine =

- Village
- Location within Maine Location within the United States
- Coordinates: 44°16′40″N 70°01′51″W
- Country: United States
- State: Maine
- County: Kennebec
- Town: Monmouth
- Elevation: 239 ft (73 m)
- Time zone: UTC-5 (Eastern (EST))
  - Summer (DST): UTC-4 (EDT)
- ZIP code: 04265
- Area code: 207
- GNIS feature ID: 572364

North Monmouth is an unincorporated village in the town of Monmouth, Kennebec County, Maine, North Monmouth is included in the Lewiston-Auburn, Maine metropolitan New England City and Town Area. United States. The community is 12.7 miles (20.4 km) west of Augusta. North Monmouth has a post office with ZIP code 04265.
