= Cumston Hall =

- U.S. National Register of Historic Places
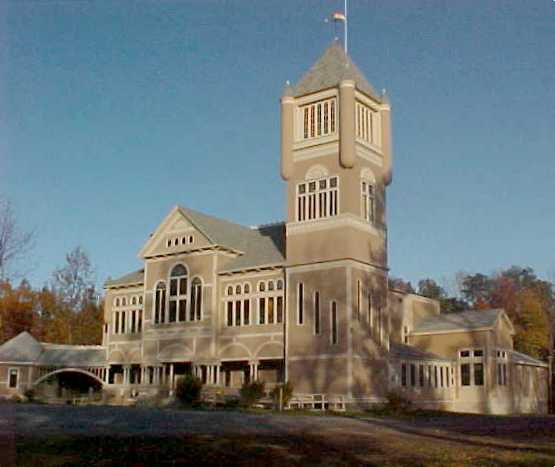

- Location within Maine Location within the United States
- Interactive map showing the location of Cumston Hall
- Location: 796 Main St., Monmouth, Maine
- Coordinates: 44°14′28″N 70°2′4″W
- Built: 1899-1900
- Architect: Harry Hayman Cochrane
- Architectural style: Romanesque Revival; Queen Anne Style
- NRHP reference No.: 73000130
- Added to NRHP: August 14, 1973

Cumston Hall is a historic community building at 796 Main Street in downtown Monmouth, Maine. Built in 1900, it is one of the most flamboyant examples of wooden Romanesque Revival architecture to be found in a small-town setting in the entire state. It was a gift to the town of Dr. Charles M. Cumston, and presently houses the local public library and local theatrical companies. It was listed on the National Register of Historic Places in 1973.

== Description ==
Cumston Hall stands prominently in the village of Monmouth, on the east side of Main Street (Maine State Route 132), opposite its junction with Blue Road. It is a large two-story wood-frame structure, with a hip roof, clapboard siding, and granite foundation. A square tower, about 70 feet (21 m) in height, projects from the front right corner, rising to a pyramidal roof with small corner turrets. The exterior is festooned with applied woodwork, with grouped round columns supporting an arcaded ground floor. Upper floor windows consists of paired round-arch windows, with a Palladian-style three part window in a gabled projecting section above the main entrance.

== History ==
Cumston Hall was completed in 1900 and is named in honor of Dr. Charles M. Cumston, a former headmaster at the English High School in Boston, who gave the Romanesque Revival and Queen Anne style building to Monmouth equipped with a library and auditorium. Cumston chose Harry Hayman Cochrane (1860–1946), a muralist who went to school in Monmouth, to design and decorate it. Cochrane's work is most noted in the cherubic portraits that adorn the ceiling and the intricate hand-molded plaster work that frames the walls, boxes, and proscenium arch of the stage.

Today, Cumston Hall is the home of the Cumston Public library, the Theater at Monmouth, Monmouth Community Players, and many local activities. The theatrical productions staged here are a draw for people living outside of Monmouth to come and see this landmark.

== See also ==
- Monmouth Academy (Maine)
- National Register of Historic Places listings in Kennebec County, Maine
