= Wales, Maine =

Town in Maine, United States

- Town
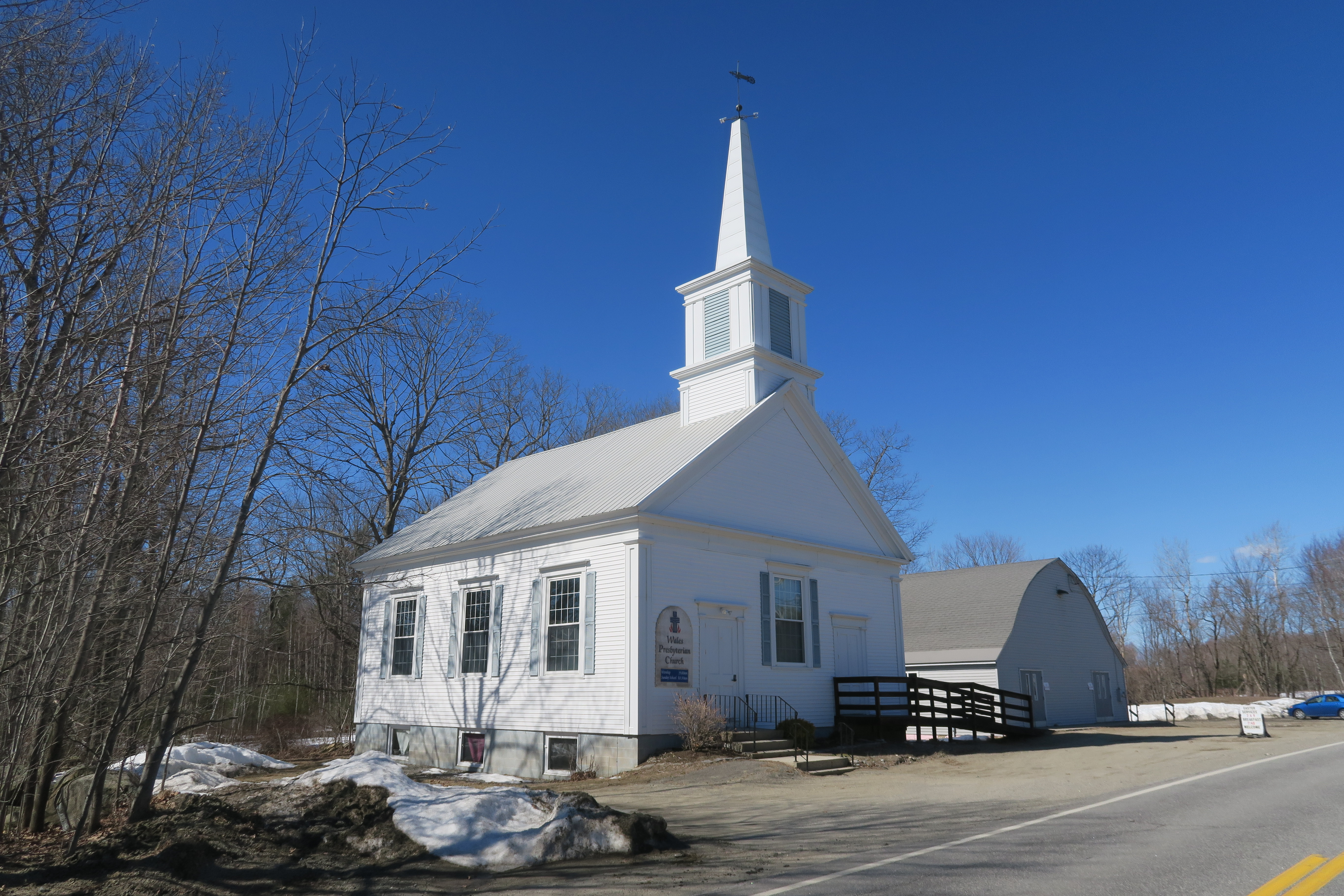
- Wales Presbyterian Church

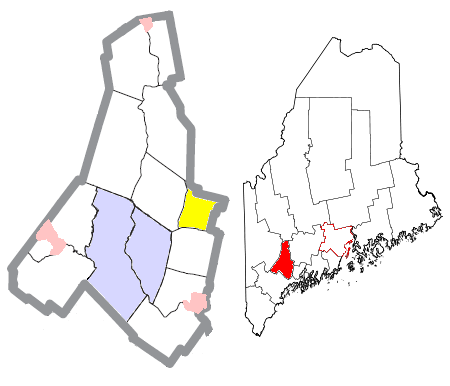
- Location of Wales (in yellow) in Androscoggin County and the state of Maine
- Coordinates: 44°10′02″N 70°01′34″W
- Country: United States
- State: Maine
- County: Androscoggin
- Incorporated: 1816
- Villages: East Wales; Wales Corner

Area
  - Total: 16.83 sq mi (43.59 km^{2})
  - Land: 15.95 sq mi (41.31 km^{2})
  - Water: 0.88 sq mi (2.28 km^{2})
- Elevation: 358 ft (109 m)

Population (2020)
  - Total: 1,608
  - Density: 101/sq mi (38.9/km^{2})
- Time zone: UTC-5 (Eastern (EST))
  - Summer (DST): UTC-4 (EDT)
- ZIP code: 04280
- Area code: 207
- FIPS code: 23-79585
- GNIS feature ID: 582787
- Website: walesmaine.gov

Wales is a town in Androscoggin County, Maine, United States. The population was 1,608 at the 2020 census. It is included in both the Lewiston-Auburn, Maine Metropolitan Statistical Area and the Lewiston-Auburn, Maine Metropolitan New England City and Town Area. The town is home to the Wales Airport. The regional Oak Hill High School opened in Wales in 1976.

== Geography ==
According to the United States Census Bureau, the town has a total area of 16.83 square miles (43.59 km^{2}), of which 15.95 square miles (41.31 km^{2}) is land and 0.88 square miles (2.28 km^{2}) is water.

== Demographics ==
Historical population
Census	Pop.	Note	%±
1820	515		—
1830	612		18.8%
1840	658		7.5%
1850	612		−7.0%
1860	602		−1.6%
1870	556		−7.6%
1880	505		−9.2%
1890	451		−10.7%
1900	436		−3.3%
1910	499		14.4%
1920	428		−14.2%
1930	446		4.2%
1940	434		−2.7%
1950	437		0.7%
1960	488		11.7%
1970	624		27.9%
1980	862		38.1%
1990	1,223		41.9%
2000	1,322		8.1%
2010	1,616		22.2%
2020	1,608		−0.5%
U.S. Decennial Census

=== 2010 census ===
As of the census of 2010, there were 1,616 people, 587 households, and 458 families living in the town. The population density was 101.3 inhabitants per square mile (39.1/km^{2}). There were 652 housing units at an average density of 40.9 per square mile (15.8/km^{2}). The racial makeup of the town was 96.4% White, 0.4% African American, 0.4% Native American, 0.6% Asian, 0.1% from other races, and 2.2% from two or more races. Hispanic or Latino of any race were 1.2% of the population.

There were 587 households, of which 38.2% had children under the age of 18 living with them, 62.4% were married couples living together, 7.2% had a female householder with no husband present, 8.5% had a male householder with no wife present, and 22.0% were non-families. 14.8% of all households were made up of individuals, and 5.4% had someone living alone who was 65 years of age or older. The average household size was 2.75 and the average family size was 3.02.

The median age in the town was 38.7 years. 25.3% of residents were under the age of 18; 7.1% were between the ages of 18 and 24; 27.5% were from 25 to 44; 30.1% were from 45 to 64; and 10.1% were 65 years of age or older. The gender makeup of the town was 51.4% male and 48.6% female.

=== 2000 census ===
As of the census of 2000, there were 1,322 people, 468 households, and 366 families living in the town. The population density was 81.9 inhabitants per square mile (31.6/km^{2}). There were 530 housing units at an average density of 32.9 per square mile (12.7/km^{2}). The racial makeup of the town was 97.05% White, 0.68% African American, 0.45% Native American, 0.91% Asian, 0.08% from other races, and 0.83% from two or more races.

There were 468 households, out of which 40.8% had children under the age of 18 living with them, 62.4% were married couples living together, 10.3% had a female householder with no husband present, and 21.6% were non-families. 15.4% of all households were made up of individuals, and 6.8% had someone living alone who was 65 years of age or older. The average household size was 2.82 and the average family size was 3.13.

In the town, the population was spread out, with 28.4% under the age of 18, 7.4% from 18 to 24, 33.7% from 25 to 44, 21.7% from 45 to 64, and 8.9% who were 65 years of age or older. The median age was 35 years. For every 100 females, there were 107.2 males. For every 100 females age 18 and over, there were 101.5 males.

The median income for a household in the town was $44,444, and the median income for a family was $47,880. Males had a median income of $29,297 versus $24,000 for females. The per capita income for the town was $16,963. About 5.6% of families and 8.0% of the population were below the poverty line, including 9.7% of those under age 18 and 14.3% of those age 65 or over.

Voter registration

Voter Registration and Party Enrollment as of January 2015
Party	Total Voters	Percentage
Unenrolled	509	43.4%
Republican	337	28.8%
Democratic	242	20.6%
Green Independent	84	7.2%
Total	1,172	100%

== Education ==
It is a part of the Regional School Unit 4 school district. Schools operated by the district:

- Oak Hill High School (9–12) – Wales
- Oak Hill Middle School (6–8) – Sabattus
- Carrie Ricker School (3–5) – Litchfield
- Sabbatus Primary School (Pre-K–2) – Sabattus
- Libby Tozier School (Pre-K–2) – Litchfield

== Notable person ==
Randall Greenwood, state representative
