= Monmouth Academy (Maine) =

Location
- 96 Academy Road; Monmouth, Maine; United States
- Coordinates: 44°15′03″N 70°02′14″W

Information
- Type: Public
- Established: 1803
- Principal: Erik Gray
- Enrollment: 240
- Colors: Maroon; White
- Mascot: Mustang
- Rival: Oak Hill Raiders
- Website: https://www.kidsrsu.org/o/ma

Monmouth Academy is a public school in Monmouth, Maine, United States. It was founded as a private school in 1803.

== History ==
Monmouth Academy was founded in 1803 and incorporated in 1809. The school's original two-story wooden building burned in 1851. In 1855 a brick building with belfry was constructed. In 1914, a rear portion was added. The only piece remaining from the original school is the pillared area on the left of what is now known as Monmouth Middle School.

In 1976, Monmouth Academy ceased being a private academy and became the town's high school. In 1989, Monmouth Academy moved across the street from the current Monmouth Middle School into a new, modernized building. In 2025, a restored historic bell tower was installed on the 1855 building.

== Student life ==
Approximately 240 students are currently enrolled at Monmouth Academy. Monmouth Academy is one of the high schools in Regional School Unit 2 (RSU number 2).

Every winter, Monmouth Academy puts on a Winter Carnival, taking place the day before February vacation. On this date, freshmen, sophomores, juniors, and seniors all compete for first place in a number of different activities. Such activities include musical chairs, Simon Says, tug of war, arm wrestling, frozen wet T-shirt contest, pie-eating contest, bobbing for apples, knockout, snow sculptures, leapfrog, wonderful hall-way decorating, and Academy Bowl. For each activity, the Monmouth Academy staff judges the participants from each class and awards points to first, second, third, and fourth-place winners. Points are also awarded for decorating your class' hallway. Each year individual classes get a theme for the competition. This also plays into the different dress up days, such as pj day, crazy hair day, mismatch day, spirit day, and theme day. The class with the most points at the end of the day wins the class belt.

=== Seminar Week ===
A few weeks after the beginning of the school year, the last week in September to be precise, the freshmen, sophomore, junior, and senior classes of Monmouth Academy participate in an educational experience week, specifically designed for each class. These four programs are Project MOBY, Sophomore Awareness, Junior Leadership, and Senior Seminar. This week ends with community service day on Friday.

==== Project MOBY ====
Project MOBY, an acronym for "My Own Back Yard," is a five-day, four-night educational camping trip for the Monmouth Academy Freshmen Class on Mount Desert Island in Acadia National Park during Seminar Week. During the trip, students hike among the mountains, and perform campfire skits as they gain experience and learn skills in earth science, biology, history, geography, mythology, English, and art. Memorable events also include a trip to Fort Knox where students learn about early life in Bucksport and a trip up the 412 foot high Penobscot Narrows Bridge Observatory, a whale watch and a Friday spent atop Cadillac Mountain.

In 1988, Mr. Jeffrey DeBlois, formerly a history and economics teacher at Monmouth Academy, was given a grant from the state of Maine to allow Project MOBY to occur. The Project began as a tradition in 1989, with DeBlois serving as project director. Mr. DeBlois still directed and attended Project MOBY to 2009, he has since retired.

==== Sophomore Awareness ====
On Sophomore Awareness the school's sophomores go to Camp Androscoggin each day for a week. Every day different adults talk to the students about making the right choices. Teachers from school talk about experiences they have had and prisoners come in and talk about the bad choices that they have made as well. There are also team building activities between speakers and time to discuss what the speakers have talked about in small groups.

==== Junior Leadership ====
Junior Leadership takes place at camp Mechuwana. Monmouth Academy's juniors go each day for the week. The first few days of the week they learn team building activities and how to teach them, and at the end of the week for a day the third and fourth graders from the elementary school visit. The groups of juniors then have to teach the younger children the activities that they learned on the first two days.

== Notable people ==
- Alonzo Garcelon, abolitionist, governor of Maine, co-founder of Bates College
- Oliver Otis Howard
  - Former Student (Also attended NYA and Kents Hill)
  - Famous Civil War general
  - Founder of Howard University
- Admiral Joseph Fowler
  - Class of 1911
  - Former head of Disneyland
- Ezra W. Wilkinson, head of school

== See also ==
- Cumston Hall
- Education in Maine
- Litchfield Academy
- Oak Hill High School
