= Wales Airport (Maine) =

- IATA: none; ICAO: none; FAA LID: ME6

Summary
- Airport type: Public use
- Owner: Thomas P. O'Connell
- Serves: Wales, Maine
- Elevation AMSL: 210 ft / 64 m
- Coordinates: 44°10′28″N 070°01′08″W

Map
- Location of airport in Maine ME6 (the United States)

Runways
Direction	Length		Surface
Direction	ft	m	Surface
4/22	2,100	640	Turf

Statistics (2010)
- Aircraft operations: 300
- Source: Federal Aviation Administration

Wales Airport (FAA LID: ME6) is a privately owned, public use airport located two nautical miles (4 km) south-southwest of the central business district of Wales, a town in Androscoggin County, Maine, United States.

== Facilities and aircraft ==
Wales Airport covers an area of 500 acres (202 ha) at an elevation of 210 feet (64 m) above mean sea level. It has one runway designated 4/22 with a turf surface measuring 2,100 by 80 feet (640 x 24 m).

For the 12-month period ending December 31, 2010, the airport had 300 general aviation aircraft operations, an average of 25 per month.

== See also ==
- List of airports in Maine
