= Litchfield, Maine =

Town in Maine, United States

- Town
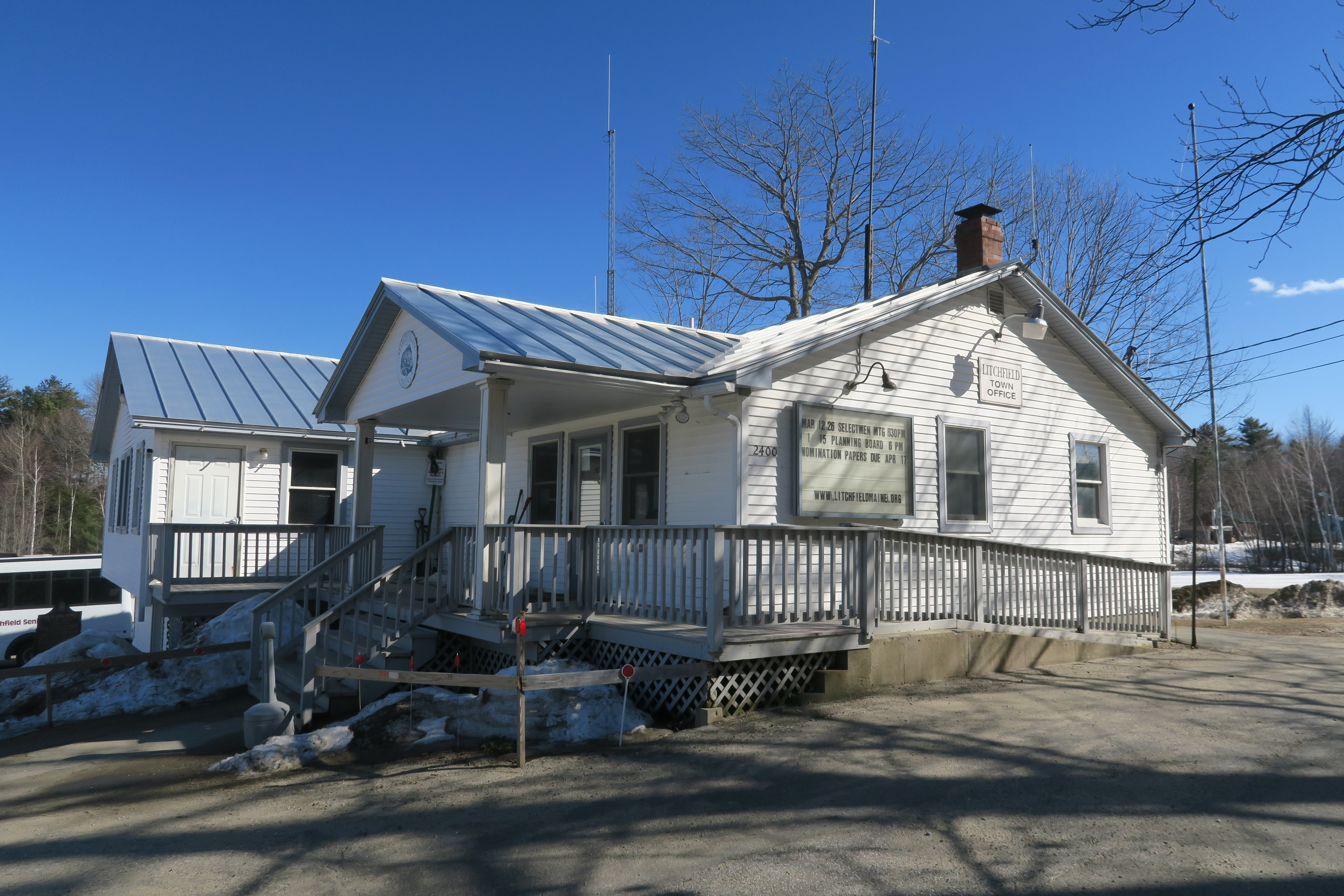
- Litchfield Town Office

- Seal

- Location in Kennebec County and the state of Maine
- Coordinates: 44°08′41″N 69°55′56″W
- Country: United States
- State: Maine
- County: Kennebec
- Incorporated: February 18, 1798
- Villages: Batchelders Crossing; Litchfield Corners; Litchfield Plains; Purgatory

Area
  - Total: 39.66 sq mi (102.72 km^{2})
  - Land: 37.44 sq mi (96.97 km^{2})
  - Water: 2.22 sq mi (5.75 km^{2})
- Elevation: 292 ft (89 m)

Population (2020)
  - Total: 3,586
  - Density: 96/sq mi (37/km^{2})
- Time zone: UTC-5 (Eastern (EST))
  - Summer (DST): UTC-4 (EDT)
- ZIP code: 04350
- Area code: 207
- FIPS code: 23-40175
- GNIS feature ID: 582564
- Website: www.litchfieldmaine.org

Litchfield is a rural town in Kennebec County, Maine, United States. The population was 3,586 at the 2020 census. Litchfield is included in the Augusta, Maine micropolitan and included in the Lewiston-Auburn, Maine metropolitan New England City and Town Area.

== History ==
Early settlement of Litchfield occurred around the town's many ponds, lakes, and streams. The first survey of the town occurred in 1770. In 1773, the territory of Litchfield was included in the Kennebec Purchase. Litchfield is found in the 1790 census as Smithtown Plantation, Lincoln County, Maine. Litchfield was first organized in 1793 as Smithfield Plantation. Litchfield was incorporated in 1795.

Before white settlers arrived, Abenaki families returned each spring to fishing stations on Cobboseecontee Stream, which was part of an Abenaki trail running on the Kennebec River to Moosehead Lake.

In 1777, the first permanent settlement in Litchfield was made by Eliphalet Smith and his family. Benjamin Hinkley and family joined the settlement two days later.

William Potter settled near Potter's Mill Stream and built the town's first sawmill there in 1789. A few years later he built a grist milll. The mills were operated by his sons Amos Potter and Jeremiah Potter until about 1870. George Webber and Revolutionary War veteran John Brown settled along Upper Pleasant Pond in the 1790s and set up farms still in operation.

Litchfield had multiple granite quarries, with the largest owned by Robert Hallowell Gardiner. It also once had multiple brick kilns and brickyards that utilized the local mineral product of common clay. Simeon Goodwin's kiln at Purgatory was the only one still operating in 1895.

Seasonal camps and cottages had begun to be built on the shores of lakes in Litchfield in the early 1860s. In 1861, the residents around Cobbosseecontee Lake were recording the annual ice out date on the lake. In 1864, cottages had begun to be built on Pleasant Pond-Cobbosseecontee Stream in Litchfield, and by 1899 there were 25 cottages on the pond and stream.

Residents established numerous apple orchards in town. These included the James A. Chase farm on the Plains Road, and the William and Sarah Springer farm on the Huntington Hill Road. By 1878, Frank C. Wyman had installed steam power to run his cider mill on the Upper Pond Road, where he ground 7,000 to 8,000 bushels of apples each year. He also operated a canning factory, canning apples, applesauce and corn. In 1924, the Agricultural Census of Maine counted 16,876 bearing apple trees in Litchfield.

In 1925, the Agricultural Census of Maine counted 222 farms in Litchfield covering 20,555 acres.

On March 1, 1973, the radio station WBLM began broadcasting from Oak Hill in Litchfield, where its antenna was also located. It later moved its studio to Auburn and then Portland.

In 1977, the first Common Ground Country Fair took place at the Litchfield Fairgrounds and drew 10,000 people. The following year, the fair drew 20,000 people. The fair was held in Litchfield in 1979 and 1980. In 1981, the fair had outgrown the Litchfield Fairgrounds and moved to Windsor.

In 1991, the Blistered Fingers Bluegrass Festival was founded at the Litchfield Fairgrounds. It occurs twice annually.

== Geography ==
According to the United States Census Bureau, the town has a total area of 39.66 square miles (102.72 km^{2}), of which 37.44 square miles (96.97 km^{2}) is land and 2.22 square miles (5.75 km^{2}) is water.

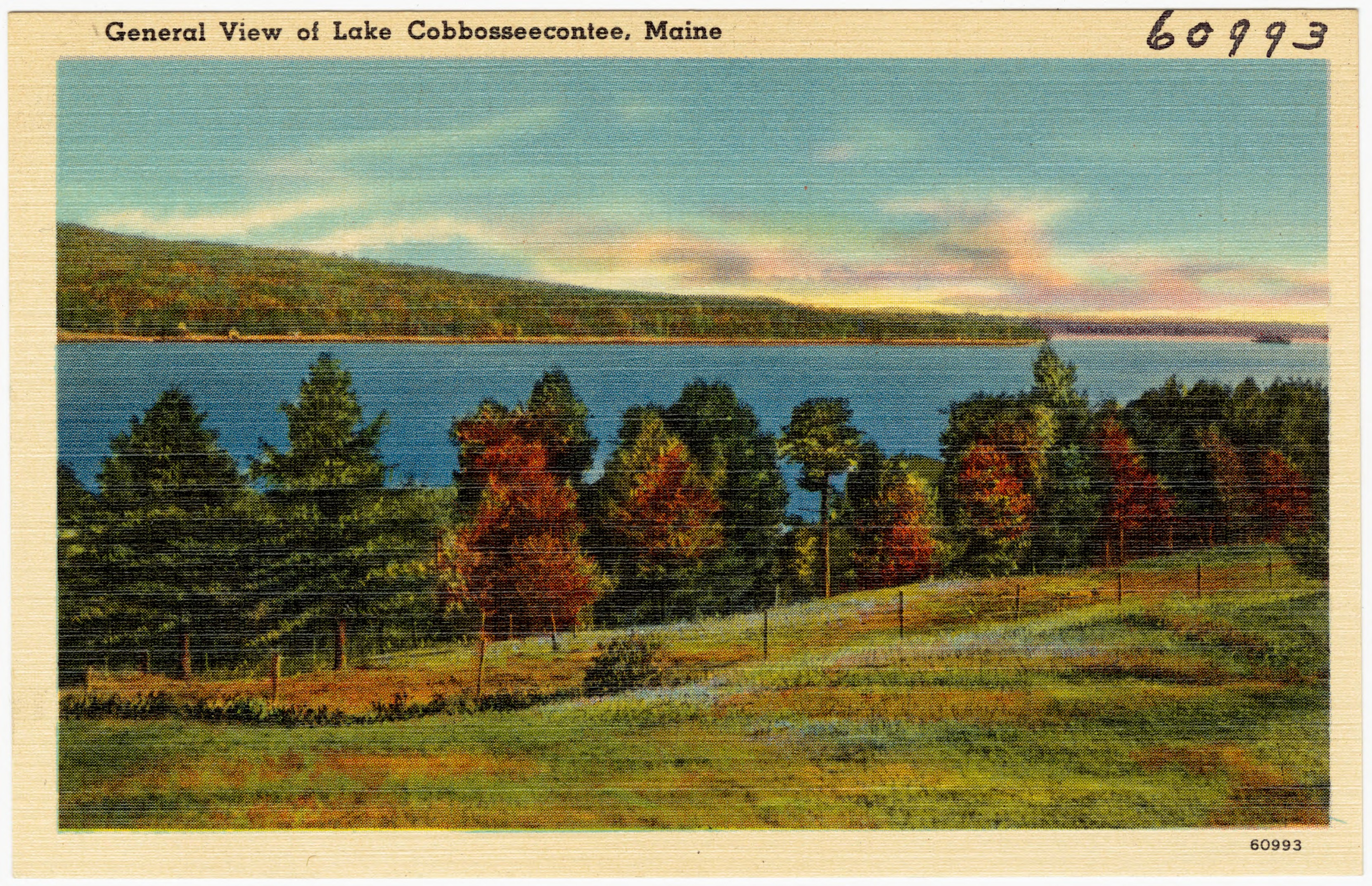
Lake Cobbosseecontee is one of many ponds, lakes, and streams in Litchfield, Maine.

Litchfield has many ponds, lakes, and streams. The town has Pleasant Pond (Cobbosseecontee Stream), Upper Pond, Horseshoe Pond, a portion of Lake Cobbosseecontee, the Tacoma Lakes (Bunker Pond, Jimmy Pond, Little Purgatory Pond, Sand Pond, Woodbury Pond), and several other ponds and streams.

Litchfield geography is varied with flat plains in the central part of town, uneven terrain elsewhere, and higher terrain to the west.

=== Villages ===
Litchfield has multiple villages. Litchfield villages are Litchfield Corner, Bachelder's Corner, Plains Village, Purgatory Village.

=== Geology ===
Litchfield has a distinct and notable geology. The rare blue mineral sodalite occurs in Litchfield. The town is one of the very few locations where the rare mineral Litchfieldite is found. Litchfieldite was first named by W. S. Bayley in 1892. Litchfieldite is named for the town of Litchfield. The first known mention of both sodalite and Litchfieldite in Litchfield was in 1845 at the sixth annual meeting of the Association of American Geologists and Naturalists. In 1886, Frank Wigglesworth Clarke documented sodalite, cancrinite, zircon and many other minerals located in the ledges of Litchfield.

=== Hill peaks ===
Litchfield has five significant hills. The highest peak is Danforth Hill. Other peaks are Oak Hill, Springer Hill, Dennis Hill, and Lunts Hill.

=== Mineral springs ===
The rocky, sandy soil of Litchfield once had a commercial mineral spring called the Forest Springs Water Company. In the 1770s early settlers from Litchfield and surrounding towns had sought the spring water during a typhoid epidemic. The Forest Springs Water Company bottled spring water at the Litchfield spring near Pleasant Pond until 1915 when the city of Gardiner installed a water filter plant.

== Demographics ==
Historical population
Census	Pop.	Note	%±
1800	1,044		—
1810	1,847		76.9%
1820	2,120		14.8%
1830	2,308		8.9%
1840	2,293		−0.6%
1850	2,100		−8.4%
1860	1,702		−19.0%
1870	1,506		−11.5%
1880	1,310		−13.0%
1890	1,126		−14.0%
1900	1,057		−6.1%
1910	964		−8.8%
1920	815		−15.5%
1930	773		−5.2%
1940	722		−6.6%
1950	953		32.0%
1960	1,011		6.1%
1970	1,222		20.9%
1980	1,954		59.9%
1990	2,650		35.6%
2000	3,110		17.4%
2010	3,624		16.5%
2020	3,586		−1.0%
U.S. Decennial Census

Adult residents of Litchfield are business owners, farmers, commuters, and retirees. There are many vacation properties in the town of Litchfield.

=== 2010 census ===
As of the census of 2010, there were 3,624 people, 1,441 households, and 1,036 families living in the town. The population density was 96.8 inhabitants per square mile (37.4/km^{2}). There were 1,861 housing units at an average density of 49.7 per square mile (19.2/km^{2}). The racial makeup of the town was 97.0% White, 0.8% African American, 0.3% Native American, 0.2% Asian, 0.1% from other races, and 1.4% from two or more races. Hispanic or Latino of any race were 0.9% of the population.

There were 1,441 households, of which 30.4% had children under the age of 18 living with them, 56.9% were married couples living together, 9.3% had a female householder with no husband present, 5.7% had a male householder with no wife present, and 28.1% were non-families. 20.3% of all households were made up of individuals, and 6.3% had someone living alone who was 65 years of age or older. The average household size was 2.50 and the average family size was 2.85.

The median age in the town was 43 years. 21.5% of residents were under the age of 18; 7.2% were between the ages of 18 and 24; 24.1% were from 25 to 44; 34.8% were from 45 to 64; and 12.4% were 65 years of age or older. The gender makeup of the town was 49.2% male and 50.8% female.

=== 2000 census ===
As of the census of 2000, there were 3,110 people, 1,190 households, and 897 families living in the town. The population density was 83.1 inhabitants per square mile (32.1/km^{2}). There were 1,595 housing units at an average density of 42.6 per square mile (16.4/km^{2}). The racial makeup of the town was 98.36% White, 0.06% African American, 0.26% Native American, 0.42% Asian, 0.16% from other races, and 0.74% from two or more races. Hispanic or Latino of any race were 0.80% of tradition the population.

There were 1,190 households, out of which 35.0% had children under the age of 18 living with them, 60.5% were married couples living together, 8.4% had a female householder with no husband present, and 24.6% were non-families. 18.1% of all households were made up of individuals, and 5.6% had someone living alone who was 65 years of age or older. The average household size was 2.61 and the average family size was 2.93.

In the town, the population was spread out, with 26.3% under the age of 18, 5.6% from 18 to 24, 31.6% from 25 to 44, 26.4% from 45 to 64, and 10.1% who were 65 years of age or older. The median age was 38 years. For every 100 females, there were 99.2 males. For every 100 females age 18 and over, there were 99.3 males.

The median income for a household in the town was $41,096, and the median income for a family was $42,220. Males had a median income of $33,000 versus $25,225 for females. The per capita income for the town was $17,835. About 5.7% of families and 8.1% of the population were below the poverty line, including 8.2% of those under age 18 and 5.5% of those age 65 or over.

== Arts and culture ==
The Litchfield Agricultural Society, now the Litchfield Farmer's Club, formed in 1857 and held the first Litchfield Fair in 1858. The annual fair is held at the fairgrounds on Plains Road. The fair is always held the weekend after Labor Day. Its motto is "What a Fair Should Be." The fair features agricultural demonstrations, an exhibition hall, a museum, an antique car parade, a demolition derby, carnival rides, games, food and vendors.

The Old Town House was constructed in 1842 on the Hallowell Road and used as a town office and meeting location until 1973, when a new Town Office was built across the street. The Old Town House cost $400 to build. After the Town Office moved, the Old Town House was converted to a museum by the Historical Society of Litchfield. The museum is located in front of Veteran's Memorial Park.

== Parks and recreation ==
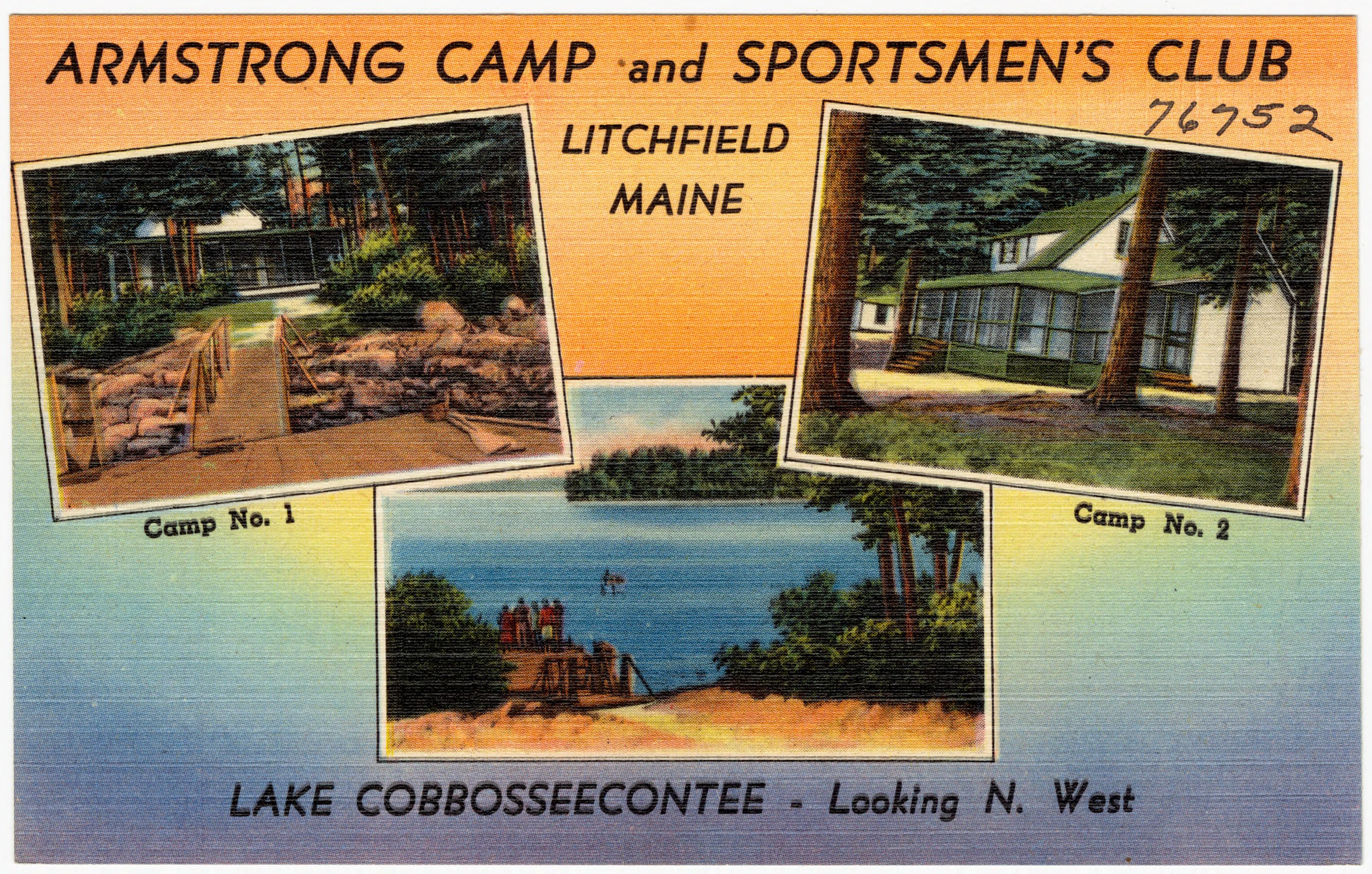
Historic camp and club in Litchfield, Maine.

Litchfield has a long history of recreation related to its many ponds, lakes, and streams. Early dance halls were Union Hall at Purgatory, Stewart's Hall at the Corner, the Tacoma Dance Hall, and the Whippoorwill Dance Hall. Camps and cottages in Litchfield host many vacationers. Many farms used to host summer boarders.

Recreational facilities include:

- Litchfield Community Park, a wooded park with a playground, walking trails, ponds, picnic tables, and a walkable Storybook Trail
- Public boat launches, located on Thorofare Road for Pleasant Pond and on Whippoorwill Road for Woodbury Pond part of the Tacoma Lakes chain
- Senior Center, the Senior Center is located in the Litchfield Academy building and offers regular programs and events
- Smithfield Plantation, a 103-acre woodland with walking trails and an outdoor amphitheater
- Veteran's Memorial Park, an athletic complex with baseball field, tennis courts, pickleball courts, basketball courts, and a winter skating pond
- Woodbury Pond Park, a public beach with playground, picnic tables, and grills

== Education ==
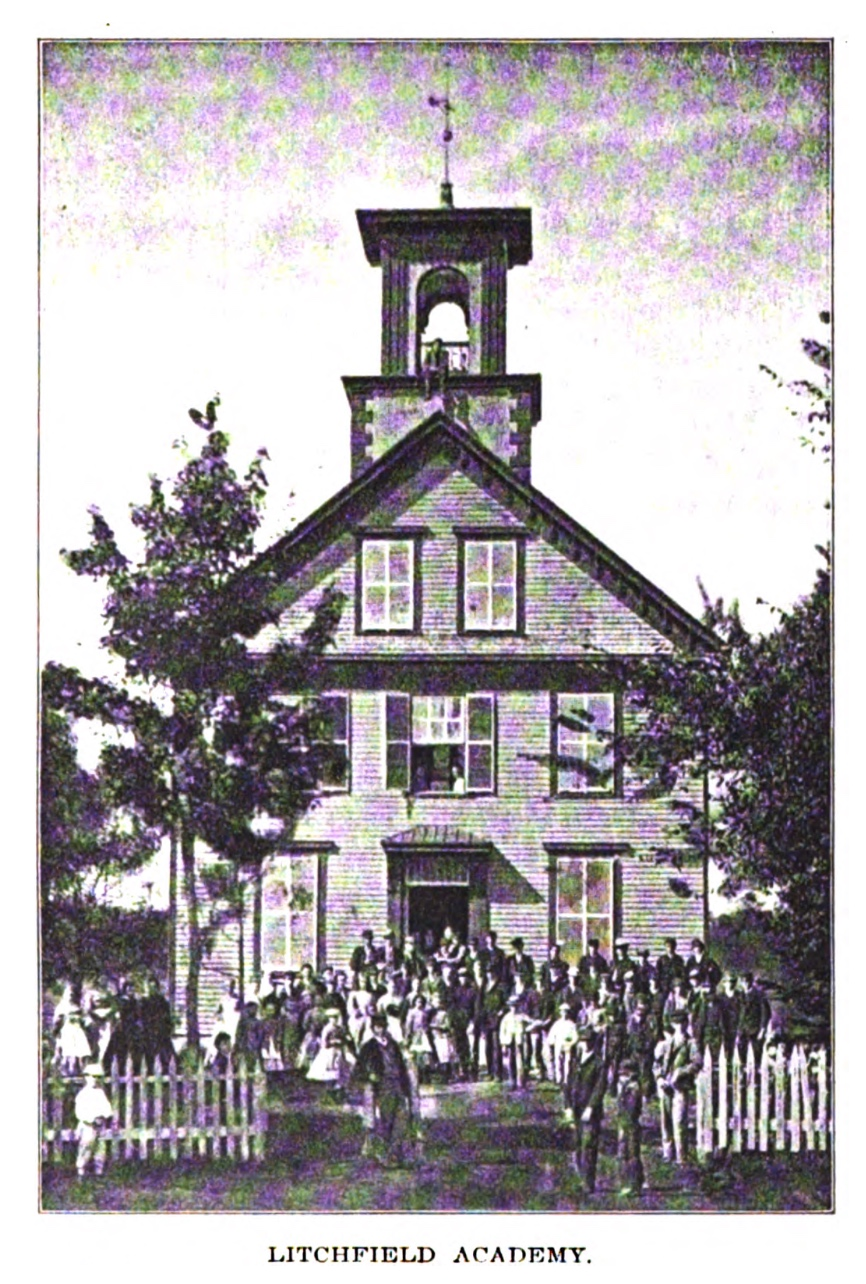
Litchfield Academy, 1895

Litchfield has consolidated its school system and along with Sabbatus and Wales is part of Regional School Unit (RSU) #4. Libby Tozier, located in Litchfield, and Sabattus Primary schools serve Grades Pre-K–2. Carrie Ricker School, located in Litchfield, serves Grades 3–5. Oak Hill Middle School serves Grades 6–8. Oak Hill High School serves Grades 9–12 and is located in Wales.

The private high school Litchfield Academy was incorporated in 1845 and built in 1852. In 1971 a wing was added to the Litchfield Academy and named the Libby-Tozier School, in honor of longtime teachers Elisie Libby and Irene Tozier.

== Infrastructure ==
Litchfield Fire Department is a volunteer department that operates two stations, and seven fire apparatus. The department features first responders for medical emergencies and one non-transporting ambulance. Medical emergency transports are done through Gardiner Fire Department. Police protection is provided by Kennebec County Sheriff's Office and Maine state Police.

== Notable people ==
- Eber Baker, politician and co-founder of Marion, Ohio
- Wilmot Brookings frontier judge and South Dakotan politician
- David C. Burr, state legislator (1820–1827)
- Henry I. Emerson, U.S. Representative from Ohio
- Avery Yale Kamila, journalist and community organizer
- William H. McLellan, American lawyer, politician and 24th Attorney General of Maine
- John Day Smith, Minnesota state legislator and judge
- Ormandel Smith, state legislator, Maine State Treasurer and Secretary of State of Maine
- Andrew Tozier, Civil War Medal of Honor Recipient (born in Monmouth)
- James Franklin Ware, Wisconsin state legislator
- Jennifer Wilcox, chemical engineer
