= Fessenden (surname) =

Fessenden is a surname. Notable people with the surname include:

- Anna Parker Fessenden (1896–1972), American botanist, math educator
- Beverly Fessenden (1926–2008), known as the actress Beverly Garland
- Francis Fessenden (1839–1907), American Civil War major general, lawyer and politician, son of William P. Fessenden
- James Deering Fessenden (1833–1882), American Civil War brigadier general, son of William P. Fessenden
- John Milton Fessenden (1804–1883), West Point graduate (class of 1824), topography engineer and railroad engineer
- Larry Fessenden (born 1963), American film director
- Laura Dayton Fessenden (1852–1924), American author
- Nicholas Fessenden (1847–1927), secretary of state for Maine (father of Stirling Fessenden)
- Reginald Fessenden (1866–1932), Canadian radio pioneer
- Samuel Fessenden (1784–1869), American abolitionist; father of Samuel Clement Fessenden, T. A. D. Fessenden, and William P. Fessenden
- Samuel Fessenden (lawyer) (1847–1908), American lawyer and politician
- Samuel C. Fessenden (1815–1882), judge and U.S. representative from Maine (1861–1863)
- Stirling Fessenden (1875–1944), American lawyer, chairman of the Shanghai Municipal Council (1923–1929)
- Susan Fessenden (1840–1932), American activist, reformer
- T. A. D. Fessenden (1826–1868), attorney, and briefly U.S. representative from Maine
- Thomas Green Fessenden (1771–1837), American author and editor
- William P. Fessenden (1806–1869), U.S. senator and Lincoln's Treasury Secretary

== See also ==
- Fessenden (disambiguation)
