= Senator Fessenden (disambiguation) =

William P. Fessenden (1806–1869) was a U.S. Senator from Maine from 1865 to 1869. Senator Fessenden may refer to:

- Samuel Fessenden (lawyer) (1847–1908), Connecticut State Senate
- Samuel Fessenden (1784–1869), Massachusetts State Senate
