= General Fessenden =

General Fessenden may refer to:

- Francis Fessenden (1839–1906), Union Army major general
- James Deering Fessenden (1833–1882), Union Army brigadier general and brevet major general
- Samuel Fessenden (1784–1869), Massachusetts State Militia major general
