= William Fessenden Allen =

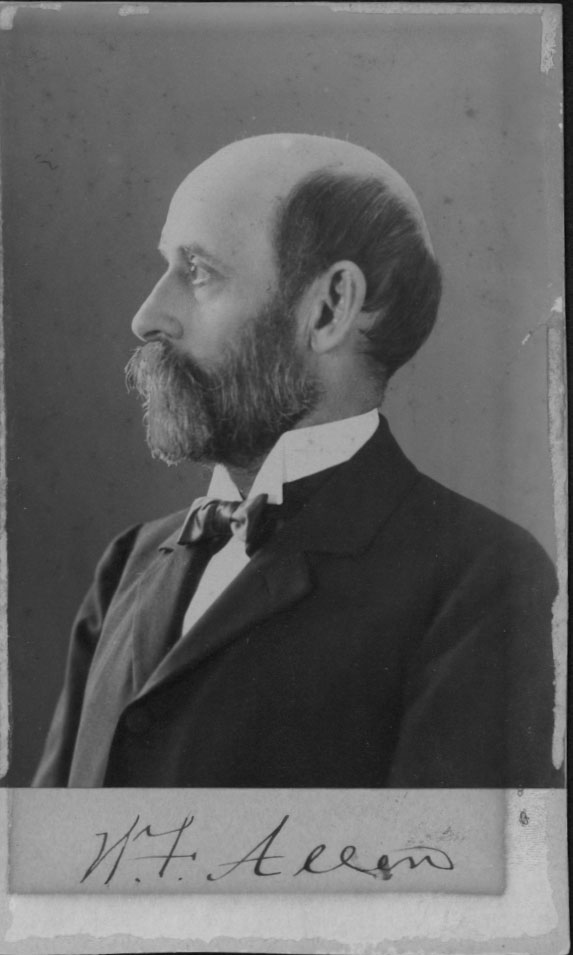

William Fessenden Allen (1831–1906) was an American businessman in the Kingdom of Hawaii and Republic of Hawaii.

== Life ==
William Fessenden Allen was born December 19, 1831, in Bangor, Maine. His mother was Sarah Elizabeth Fessenden. His father was politician and diplomat Elisha Hunt Allen (1804–1883). After his mother died in 1845, he was brought up by his mother's mother Patty Fessenden in Brattleboro, Vermont, along with his brother and his two sisters.

Allen attended Williams College from 1848 to 1850. When his father was appointed Consul to the Kingdom of Hawaii, they sailed to Honolulu and arrived on May 31, 1850. However, the young Allen was attracted to the California Gold Rush and spent two years working in San Francisco. In 1852 he joined his father in Hawaii and worked as bookkeeper in a store selling supplies to whaling ships. He officially renounced his American citizenship and became naturalized to the Kingdom of Hawaii on June 19, 1860.

Allen married Cordelia Church Bishop (1837–1912), the cousin of banker Charles Reed Bishop, in 1865 at San Francisco. He served as president of the sugarcane plantation in Princeville, Hawaii, when his father traveled back to Washington, D.C.

== Government ==
Allen served as the Collector General of Customs for the Kingdom of Hawaii from January 1, 1864, until September 19, 1884. On March 5, 1867, King Kamehameha V appointed him to his staff with ceremonial rank of Colonel. He was reappointed by King Lunalilo in 1873 and King Kalākaua in 1874. Kalākaua appointed Allen to his Privy Council on January 18, 1879.

After the overthrow of the Kingdom of Hawaii Allen was on the Advisory Council of the Provisional Government of Hawaii (serving as chairman in March 1894), and then the Executive Council of the Republic of Hawaii.

Allen's health started to fail in 1905 and he died after suffering a stroke February 5, 1906, in Honolulu.

== Family tree ==
Fessenden family tree

William Fessenden (1694–1756)	Martha Brown (1699–1746)
William Fessenden (1718–1758)	Thomas Fessenden (1739–1813)
William Fessenden (1747–1805)	Thomas G. Fessenden (1771–1837)	William Fessenden (1779–1815)
Samuel Fessenden (1784–1869)	Sarah Fessenden (1808–1845)	Elisha Hunt Allen (1804–1883)
Ellen M. Deering (1809-1857)	William P. Fessenden (1808–1869)	Samuel C. Fessenden (1815–1881)	Hewett Fessenden (1819–1885)	T. A. D. Fessenden (1826–1868)	William Fessenden Allen (1831–1906)
James Deering Fessenden (1833–1897)	Francis Fessenden (1839–1907)	Samuel Fessenden (1847–1908)	Nicholas Fessenden (1847-1927)
Stirling Fessenden (1875-1944)
