= Thomas Fessenden =

Thomas Fessenden may refer to:

- Thomas Green Fessenden (1771–1837), American author and editor
- T. A. D. Fessenden (1826–1868), American politician
