= Evergreen Cemetery (Portland, Maine) =

- U.S. National Register of Historic Places
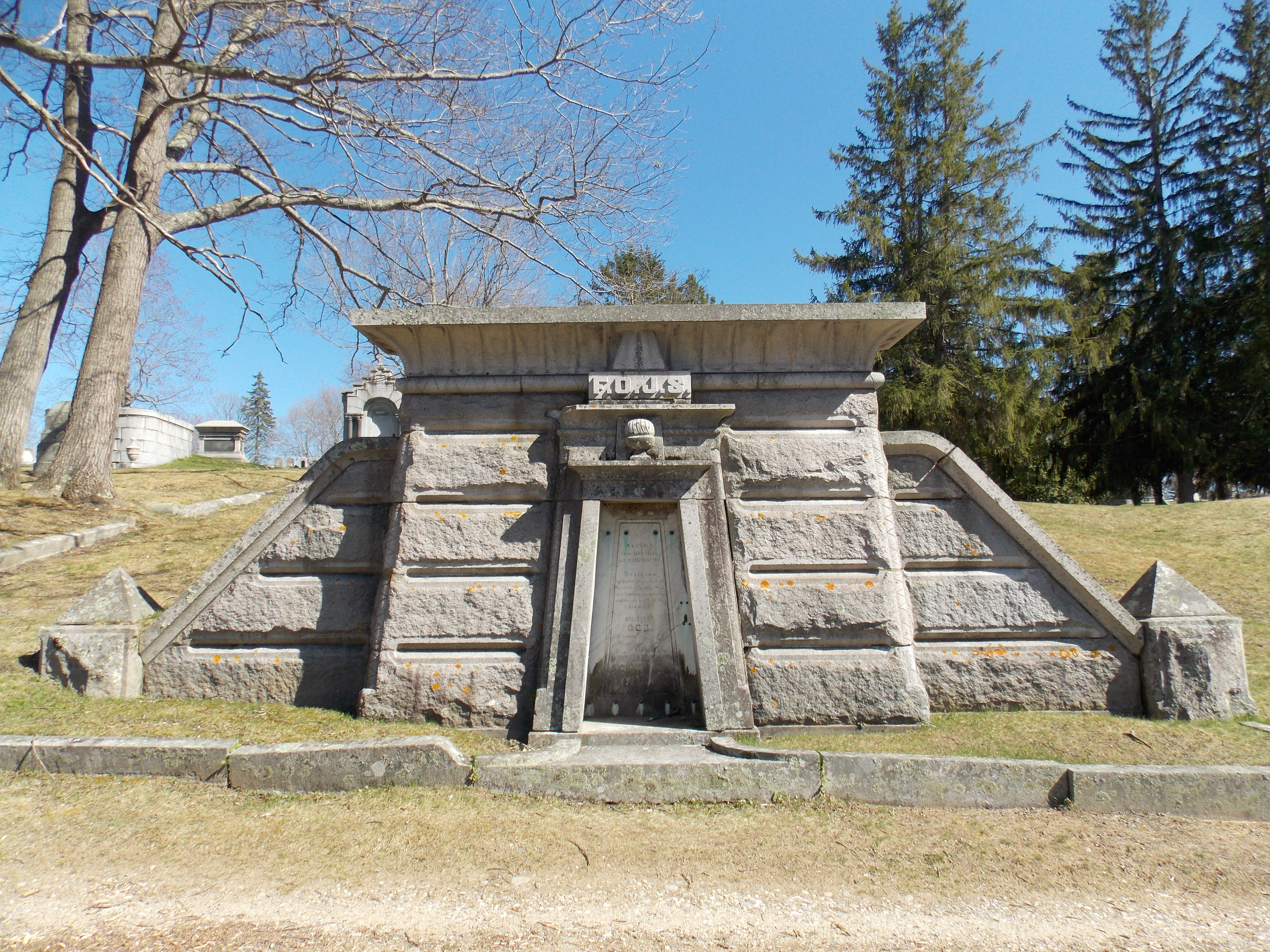
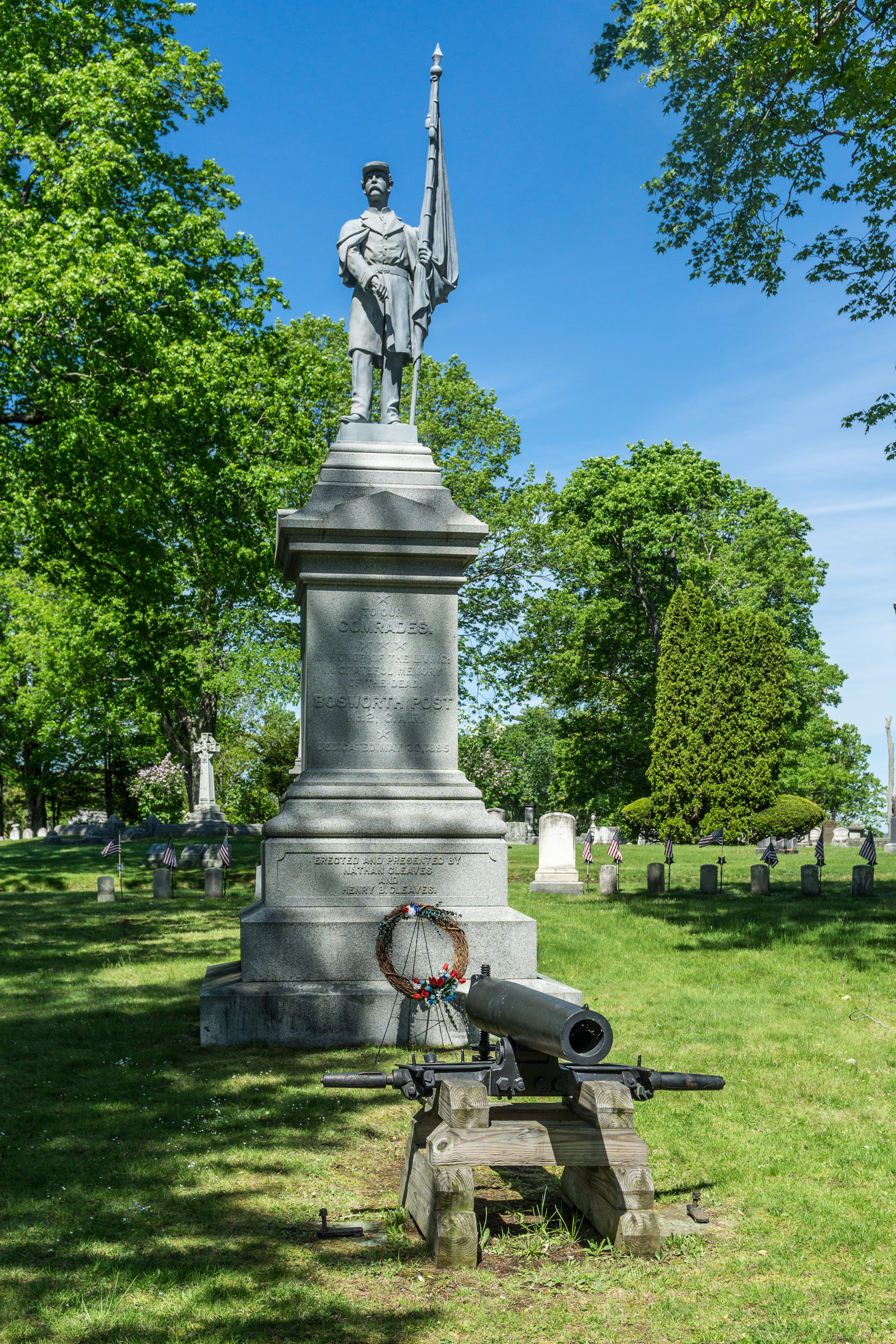
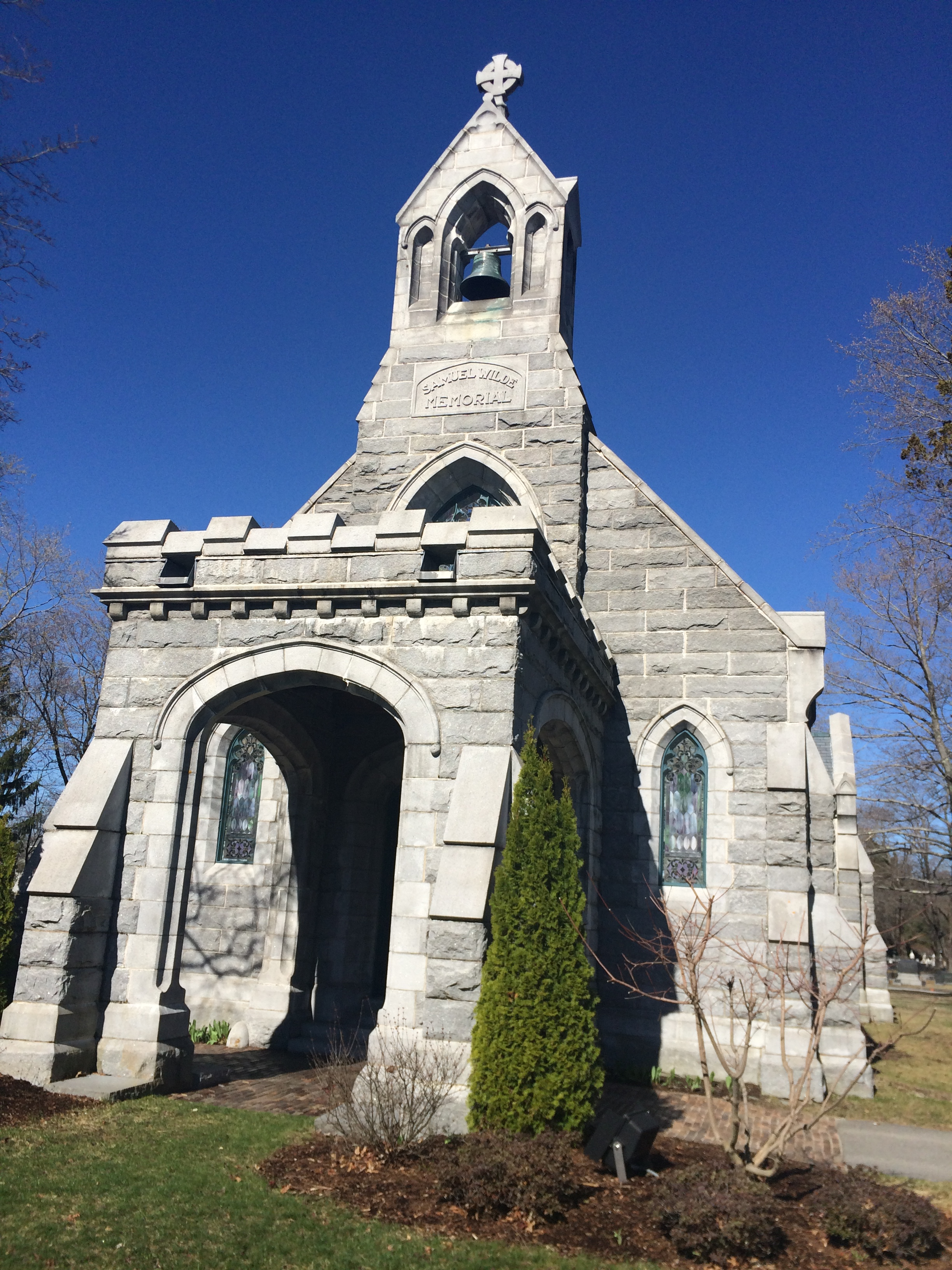
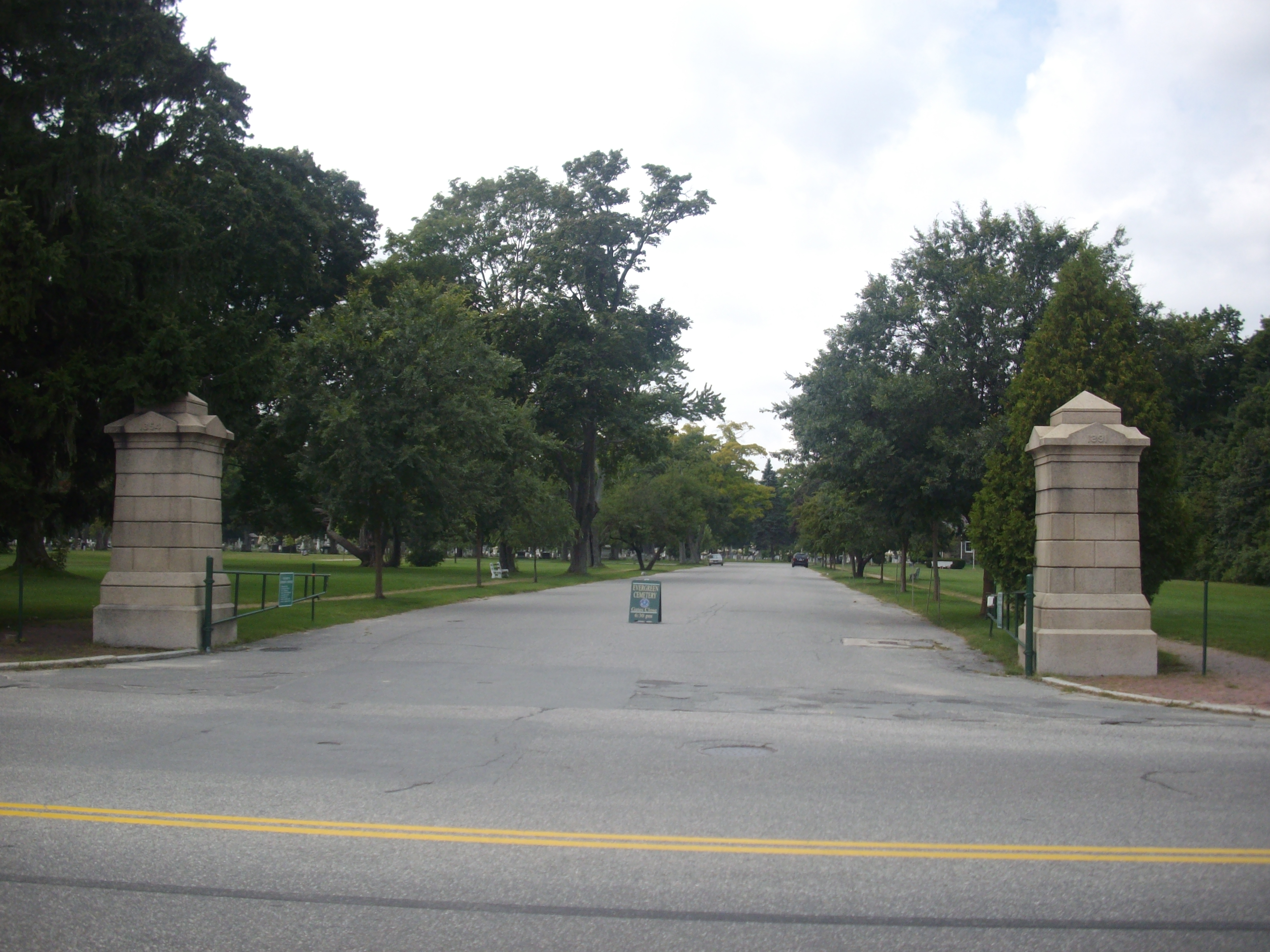
- F.O.J. Smith Tomb Civil War Memorial Wilde Memorial Chapel Stevens Avenue entrance

- Location within Maine Location within the United States
- Nearest city: Portland, Maine
- Coordinates: 43°40′54″N 70°18′4″W
- Area: 239 acres (97 ha) (cemetery size); 140 acres (57 ha) (National Register listing size)
- Built: 1855
- Architects: Charles R. Goodell; Frederick A. Tompson
- No. of graves: ~60,000–70,000
- NRHP reference No.: 92000791
- Added to NRHP: June 18, 1992

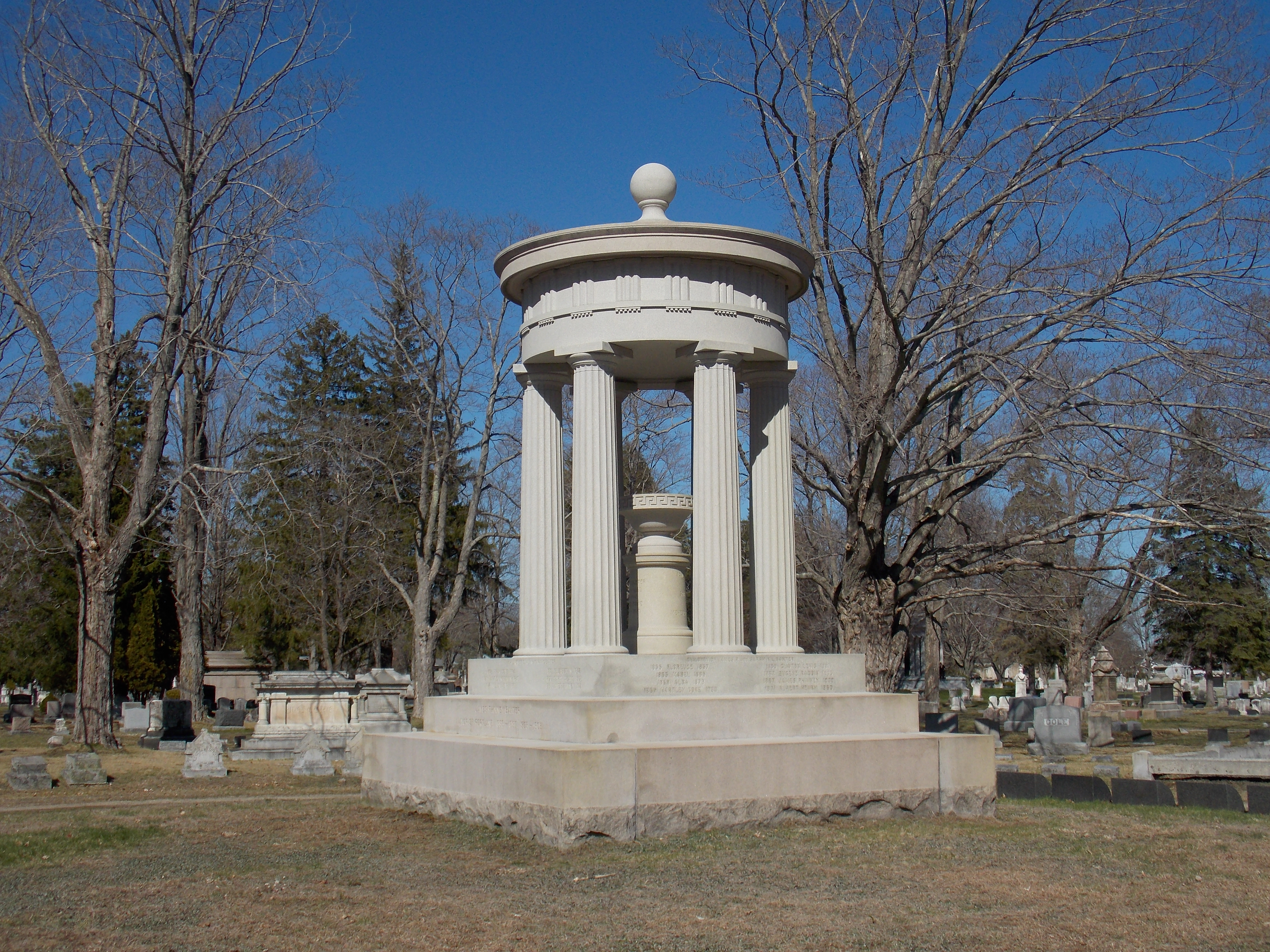
The Baxter Family Monument

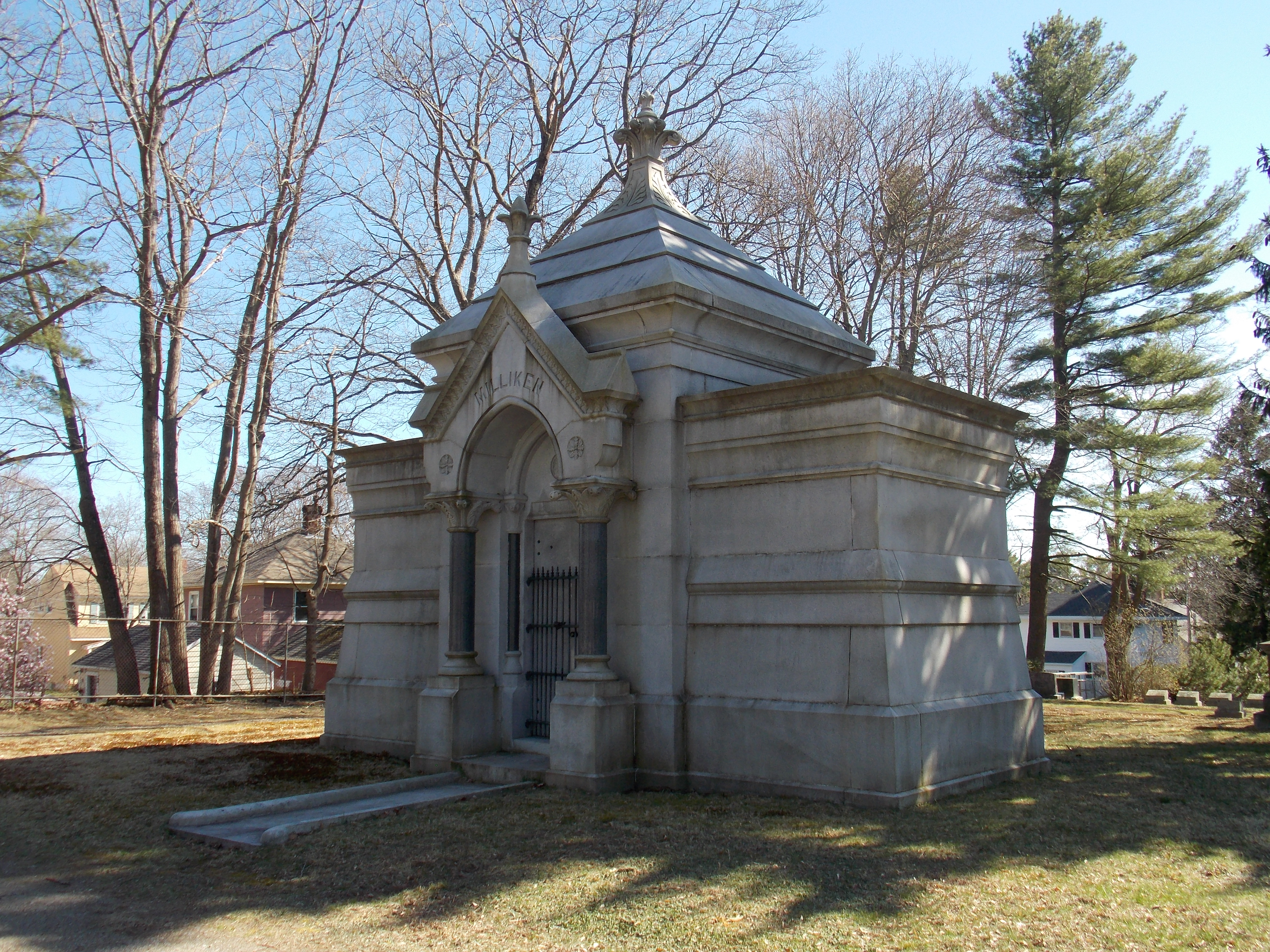
Milliken mausoleum

Evergreen Cemetery is a garden-style cemetery established in 1855 in Portland, Maine. As of 2014 it is the largest cemetery in the state at 239 acres (97 ha) and contains an estimated 60,000 to 70,000 graves. The older areas have curvilinear paths typical of the rural cemetery movement typical of the 19th century. The more recent sections use a more rectilinear layout. The most prominent mausoleums include the F.O.J. Smith Tomb and the Chisholm Tomb, a small-scale Classical Revival replica of the Maison Carrée. In 1992, the 140-acre (57 ha) historical portion of the cemetery was listed on the National Register of Historic Places.

=== F.O.J. Smith Tomb ===
The F.O.J. Smith Tomb is a granite Egyptian Revival style tomb listed on the National Register of Historic Places in 1974. It is named for Francis Ormand Jonathan Smith, a US Congressman who served from 1833 to 1839. It was likely built soon after his daughter's death in 1860, and is mostly fashioned out of roughly finished granite blocks, topped by a projecting rolled cornice. It has a sun motif and a marble door with the inscription:

NATURE
teaches that
All Flesh Must Die.
RELIGION
inspires Hope that all
Spiritual Beings will
live forever, in spheres
and forms to which they
are fitted.
Believe in
GOD,
and fear not to leave wholly
to Him the Great Future.
His plans for Heaven
as for Earth must be
All-wise, Benevolent
and
Immutable.
All men can know of future life.

=== Wilde Memorial Chapel ===
Wilde Memorial Chapel is a Gothic-style chapel. It was built as a mortuary chapel by Falmouth resident Mary Ellen Lunt Wilde in 1890. It was designed by Portland architect Frederick A. Tompson and gifted to the city in 1902. The granite building is used for both memorial and wedding services, with a maximum capacity of 105.

=== Civil War veterans ===
The cemetery contains the remains of about 1,400 American Civil War veterans, and in 1895, a memorial consisting of a metal soldier standing atop a granite base was donated by former Maine governor Henry B. Cleaves and Judge Nathan Cleaves.

== Notable interments ==
- John Appleton, congressman and assistant secretary of state
- James Phinney Baxter, businessman and Mayor of Portland
- Carroll Lynwood Beedy, U.S. congressman
- Hugh J. Chisholm, paper magnate
- Asa William Henry Clapp, congressman
- Seth F. Clark, state legislator
- Nathan Cleaves, state legislator and probate judge
- George Cleeve, settler and founder of Portland
- Nathan Clifford, U.S. attorney general and associate justice of the US Supreme Court
- Lydia Neal Dennett, abolitionist and suffragist
- Neal Dow, mayor, general, candidate for president, and "father" of the Prohibition Movement
- Francis H. Fassett, architect
- Francis Fessenden, general
- James D. Fessenden, general
- Samuel Fessenden, lieutenant
- Samuel C. Fessenden, congressman
- Thomas Amory Deblois Fessenden, congressman
- William P. Fessenden, congressman, U.S. senator and secretary of the treasury
- Frank Fixaris, sportscaster
- Elbridge Gerry, congressman
- Charles Goddard (1879–1951), playwright and screenwriter
- Robert Christian Hale, lieutenant and congressman
- Charles Badger Hall, US Army major general
- Obed Hall, congressman
- Asher Crosby Hinds, congressman
- Darius H. Ingraham, diplomat, lawyer, mayor
- Seth Larrabee, attorney
- Charles Thornton Libby, historian, genealogist and lawyer
- Mary King Longfellow, painter
- John Lynch, congressman
- Charles Mattocks, general
- Joseph C. Noyes, congressman
- Albion Parris, governor, congressman, judge.
- John J. Perry, congressman
- William Lebaron Putnam, mayor
- Thomas Brackett Reed, congressman and speaker of the US House of Representatives
- Henry P. Rines, hotelier
- Abner O. Shaw, physician to Joshua Chamberlain in the Civil War with the 20th Maine Infantry Regiment
- Ether Shepley, senator
- George Foster Shepley, general
- Francis Ormand Jonathan Smith, congressman
- John Calvin Stevens, architect
- Lorenzo De Medici Sweat, congressman
- Henry Goddard Thomas, general
- William W. Thomas Jr., politician
- Charles W. Walton, congressman

== See also ==
- National Register of Historic Places listings in Portland, Maine
- List of burial places of justices of the Supreme Court of the United States
