= Thomas Green Fessenden =

American author and editor (1771–1837)

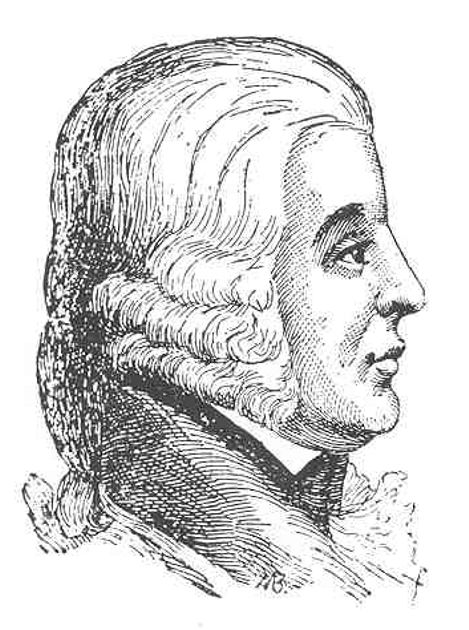
- Born: April 22, 1771; Walpole, Province of New Hampshire, British North America
- Died: November 11, 1837 (aged 66); Boston, Massachusetts, U.S.
- Resting place: Mount Auburn Cemetery
- Education: Dartmouth College
- Occupations: Author; editor
- Years active: 1801–1837

Thomas Green Fessenden (April 22, 1771 – November 11, 1837) was an American author and editor who worked in England and the United States.

== Early life and education ==
Born and raised on the family farm in Walpole, New Hampshire as oldest of nine children, Fessenden graduated from Dartmouth College in 1796. During his college term he wrote a ballad titled "Jonathan's Courtship", which was reprinted in England. He studied law in Vermont with Nathaniel Chipman, occupying his leisure in writing humorous poems and other papers for the Farmer's Weekly Museum of Walpole, of which Joseph Dennie was then editor.

== Career ==
He went to London in 1801 as agent for a new hydraulic machine. The enterprise proved a failure and involved him in pecuniary difficulties. While in London, he became interested in the construction of a patent mill on the River Thames, and in this enterprise also he was completely ruined. At this time, he formed the acquaintance of Benjamin Douglas Perkins, patentee of the metallic tractors (see Elisha Perkins) which Fessenden advertised in a poem in Hudibrastic verse. The poem, "Terrible Tractoration", was anonymously published in 1803 and satirized the members of the medical profession who opposed the use of the instruments. Nathaniel Hawthorne characterized the poem as "a work of strange, grotesque ideas, aptly expressed". The poem was enlarged and republished in New York in 1806 as "The Minute Philosopher".

Politically aligned with the Federalists, Fessenden was suspicious of democracy and wrote an extended poem criticizing the Democratic-Republican Party.

Fessenden returned to the United States in 1804 and settled in Boston. Later he went to New York City and edited the Weekly Inspector for two years. In 1812, he began to practice law in Bellows Falls, Vermont. He moved to Brattleboro, Vermont, in 1815, and was editor of the Reporter there. He returned to Bellows Falls from 1816 till 1822 to conduct the Intelligencer. In 1822, he went to Boston and founded the New England Farmer with which he was connected until his death. He also edited The Horticultural Register and The Silk Manual. In 1834 he published The Complete Farmer and Rural Economist, which was revised, improved and enlarged several times, until the 10th edition in 1857.

== Death ==
Fessenden died in Boston on November 11, 1837, is buried at Mount Auburn Cemetery. Hawthorne included a piece on Fessenden in his Fanshawe, and other Pieces (Boston, 1876).

== Works ==
Some of his publications were:

- Terrible Tractoration!! A Poetical Petition Against Galvanising Trumpery, and the Perkinistic Institution (1804)
- Original Poems (1806)
- Democracy Unveiled (1806)
- The Register of Arts, or a Compendious View of Some of the Most Useful Modern Discoveries and Inventions (1808)
- Pills, Poetical, Political, and Philosophical, Prescribed for the Purpose of Purging the Public of Piddling Philosophers, Penny Poetasters, of Paltry Politicians, and Petty Partisans, by Peter Pepperbox, Poet and Physician (1809)
- The American Clerk's Companion (1815)
- The Ladies' Monitor (1818)
- The Husbandman and Housewife (1820)
- Laws of Patents for New Inventions (1822)
- The Complete Farmer and Rural Economist, (1834); 10th revised edition in 1857

His last satire was a little poem entitled "Wooden Booksellers."

== Family ==
His father was Thomas Fessenden, a clergyman, born in Cambridge, Massachusetts, in 1739, died in 1813. The elder Thomas was the son of Rev. William Fessenden, of Cambridge, and uncle to Samuel Fessenden, the father of William P. Fessenden. After graduation at Harvard in 1758, the elder Thomas became pastor in Walpole, New Hampshire, which charge he held from 1767 until 1813. He was author of The Science of Sanctity (1804), and The Boston Self-styled Gentlemen-Reviewers reviewed (1806).

Fessenden family tree

William Fessenden (1694–1756)	Martha Brown (1699–1746)
William Fessenden (1718–1758)	Thomas Fessenden (1739–1813)
William Fessenden (1747–1805)	Thomas G. Fessenden (1771–1837)	William Fessenden (1779–1815)
Samuel Fessenden (1784–1869)	Sarah Fessenden (1808–1845)	Elisha Hunt Allen (1804–1883)
Ellen M. Deering (1809-1857)	William P. Fessenden (1808–1869)	Samuel C. Fessenden (1815–1881)	Hewett Fessenden (1819–1885)	T. A. D. Fessenden (1826–1868)	William Fessenden Allen (1831–1906)
James Deering Fessenden (1833–1897)	Francis Fessenden (1839–1907)	Samuel Fessenden (1847–1908)	Nicholas Fessenden (1847-1927)
Stirling Fessenden (1875-1944)
