= James Deering Fessenden =

American politician

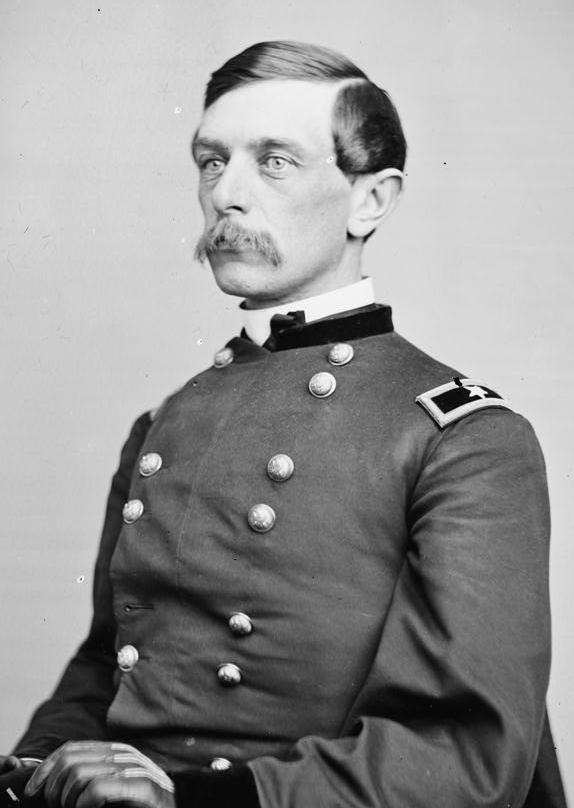
- James D. Fessenden
- Born: September 28, 1833; Westbrook, Maine
- Died: November 18, 1882 (aged 49); Portland, Maine
- Burial place: Evergreen Cemetery, Portland, Maine
- Alma mater: Bowdoin College (1852)
- Relatives: William P. Fessenden (father); Francis Fessenden (brother); Samuel C. Fessenden (uncle); T.A.D. Fessenden (uncle)
- Military career
- Allegiance: United States of America; Union
- Branch: United States Army; Union Army
- Service years: 1861–1866
- Rank: Brigadier General; Brevet Major General
- Commands: Brigade in the XIX Corps
- Conflicts: American Civil War; Battle of Missionary Ridge; Atlanta campaign; Battle of Cedar Creek

Member of the Maine State Legislature

Personal details
- Occupation: Lawyer; Civil servant Editor

James Deering Fessenden (September 28, 1833 – November 18, 1882) was an American military officer, lawyer, and politician who served as a general in the Union Army during the American Civil War.

Primarily a staff officer and operations planner until the latter stages of the war, he commanded an infantry brigade in the Western Theater in 1864 and 1865. In 1862, he organized in South Carolina what became one of the first black regiments in the Federal army. He was a member of the powerful Fessenden family, which was prominent in national politics during the mid-19th century.

== Early life and career ==
James D. Fessenden was born in Westbrook, Maine, in the early autumn of 1833. He was the son of U.S. Senator William P. Fessenden and a brother of Francis Fessenden, who would also serve as a general in the Union army. Another brother, Samuel, would be killed at the Second Battle of Bull Run during the war. Two uncles, Samuel C. Fessenden and T. A. D. Fessenden were U.S. Congressmen.

He was educated in the local schools and then graduated from Bowdoin College in 1852. He studied law, passed his bar exam, and joined his father's law firm.

== Civil War ==
After the outbreak of the Civil War in early 1861, Fessenden spent the summer recruiting and organizing a company of skilled riflemen and marksmen that became a company in the United States Sharpshooters. In November of that year, he received a commission as a captain in the sharpshooter company and served in the defenses of Washington, D.C. Through the influences of his powerful father, he received a promotion to lieutenant colonel and a new position as a staff officer and aide-de-camp to Union Maj. Gen. David Hunter. He held that position from March 1862 until January 1863, serving primarily in the Department of the South and the X Corps. During that period, he was promoted to colonel in July 1862. He was involved in planning the Union operations against the Confederate defenses of Charleston, South Carolina, but missed participating in the major attacks while recovering in Washington, D.C., from a riding accident suffered in the field. During his recuperation, he frequently used his oratory and organizational skills to recruit new volunteers for military service.

In November 1863, Fessenden became an aide-de-camp to Maj. Gen. Joseph Hooker, who had been sent to Tennessee with two corps of the Army of the Potomac to reinforce the Army of the Cumberland. Hooker commended him for his bravery at the Battle of Missionary Ridge and recommended his promotion to brigadier general. He was commended three times for his actions during the Atlanta campaign and again recommended for higher rank by Hooker.

In August 1864, he finally received his long desired promotion to brigadier general, but did not get a field command initially as his sponsor Hooker had since left the army. He was assigned to command a brigade in the Army of the Shenandoah in the Shenandoah Valley region of Virginia, an assignment initially meant for his brother, who lost a leg in the Red River Campaign that precluded his taking the assignment. James Fessenden arrived in Virginia and assumed command of a brigade in the XIX Corps under Maj. Gen. William H. Emory. He participated in the Battle of Cedar Creek in October, engaged in scouting duty, and then was assigned command of the Union garrison in the defenses of Winchester, Virginia, in January 1865.

In May 1865, he led his brigade in the Grand Review of the Armies in Washington, D.C., following the surrender of the two leading Confederate armies in the Eastern Theater. He subsequently commanded troops under Maj. Gen. Winfield S. Hancock and an occupation garrison in South Carolina before mustering out of the army on January 15, 1866. He received a brevet promotion to major general before leaving the service.

== Postbellum career ==
Fessenden returned to Maine, where he resumed his law career in partnership with his surviving brother Francis. He entered local and state politics, and was elected to serve three terms in the Maine State Legislature. He also served the Federal government as the Register of Bankruptcy for his district. Late in his life, he edited his brother's book, Life and Services of William Pitt Fessenden, which was published posthumously in 1907.

He was a member of the Maine Commandery of the Military Order of the Loyal Legion of the United States - a military society for officers who has served in the Union during the Civil War.

James D. Fessenden died in Portland, Maine, where he is buried in Evergreen Cemetery.

== Family tree ==
Fessenden family tree

William Fessenden (1694–1756)	Martha Brown (1699–1746)
William Fessenden (1718–1758)	Thomas Fessenden (1739–1813)
William Fessenden (1747–1805)	Thomas G. Fessenden (1771–1837)	William Fessenden (1779–1815)
Samuel Fessenden (1784–1869)	Sarah Fessenden (1808–1845)	Elisha Hunt Allen (1804–1883)
Ellen M. Deering (1809-1857)	William P. Fessenden (1808–1869)	Samuel C. Fessenden (1815–1881)	Hewett Fessenden (1819–1885)	T. A. D. Fessenden (1826–1868)	William Fessenden Allen (1831–1906)
James Deering Fessenden (1833–1897)	Francis Fessenden (1839–1907)	Samuel Fessenden (1847–1908)	Nicholas Fessenden (1847-1927)
Stirling Fessenden (1875-1944)

== See also ==
- List of American Civil War generals (Union)
