= T. A. D. Fessenden =

American politician (1826–1868)

Thomas Amory Deblois Fessenden

Member of the U.S. House of Representatives from Maine's 2nd district
- In office December 1, 1862 – March 3, 1863
- Preceded by: Charles W. Walton
- Succeeded by: Sidney Perham

Personal details
- Born: January 23, 1826 Portland, Maine
- Died: September 28, 1868 (aged 42) Auburn, Maine
- Spouse: Elizabeth Rollins Titcomb
- Children: Theodore B Foster
- Parent: Samuel Fessenden (father)
- Relatives: William P. Fessenden (brother); Samuel C. Fessenden (brother); Francis Fessenden (nephew); James D. Fessenden (nephew)
- Education: North Yarmouth Academy; Dartmouth College; Bowdoin College
- Occupation: Lawyer

Thomas Amory Deblois Fessenden (January 23, 1826 – September 28, 1868) was an American politician. He was a U.S. Representative from Maine.

Born in Portland, Maine, he was the son of abolitionist legislator Samuel Fessenden, and brother of Treasury Secretary William P. Fessenden and congressman Samuel C. Fessenden. He was an uncle of Union Army generals Francis Fessenden and James D. Fessenden.

He attended North Yarmouth Academy and Dartmouth College and graduated from Bowdoin College in 1845. He then studied law and was admitted to the bar in April 1848. He established a practice in Mechanic Falls, Maine, and moved to Auburn, Maine in 1850, where he continuing working as an attorney.

He was a delegate to the Republican National Convention in 1856 and 1868 and a member of the Maine House of Representatives in 1860 and 1868, as well as prosecuting attorney for Androscoggin County in 1861 and 1862.

He was elected as a Republican to the 37th Congress to fill the vacancy caused by the resignation of Charles W. Walton and served from December 1, 1862, to March 3, 1863, and was not a candidate for renomination in 1862.

He returned to Maine and resumed the practice of law. He died in Auburn, and is interred in Evergreen Cemetery, Portland, Maine.

== Family tree ==
Fessenden family tree

William Fessenden (1694–1756)	Martha Brown (1699–1746)
William Fessenden (1718–1758)	Thomas Fessenden (1739–1813)
William Fessenden (1747–1805)	Thomas G. Fessenden (1771–1837)	William Fessenden (1779–1815)
Samuel Fessenden (1784–1869)	Sarah Fessenden (1808–1845)	Elisha Hunt Allen (1804–1883)
Ellen M. Deering (1809-1857)	William P. Fessenden (1808–1869)	Samuel C. Fessenden (1815–1881)	Hewett Fessenden (1819–1885)	T. A. D. Fessenden (1826–1868)	William Fessenden Allen (1831–1906)
James Deering Fessenden (1833–1897)	Francis Fessenden (1839–1907)	Samuel Fessenden (1847–1908)	Nicholas Fessenden (1847-1927)
Stirling Fessenden (1875-1944)

U.S. House of Representatives
Preceded by Charles W. Walton	Member of the U.S. House of Representatives from Maine's 2nd congressional district December 1, 1862 – March 3, 1863	Succeeded by Sidney Perham
