= Fessenden =

Fessenden may refer to:

== People ==
- Fessenden (surname), includes a list of notable people with the surname
- Fessenden Nott Otis (1825–1900), American pioneer in the medical field of urology

== Places ==
- Fessenden, North Dakota, a city
- 15939 Fessenden, an asteroid named after Reginald Fessenden

== Schools ==
- Fessenden School, a private day and boarding school for boys in West Newton, Massachusetts
- Fessenden Elementary School, a school in Ocala, Florida

== Other uses ==
- USS Fessenden (DE-142), a destroyer escort of World War II, named in honor of Reginald Fessenden
- Fessenden oscillator, an underwater sound projector
