= Francis Fessenden =

American military officer and politician

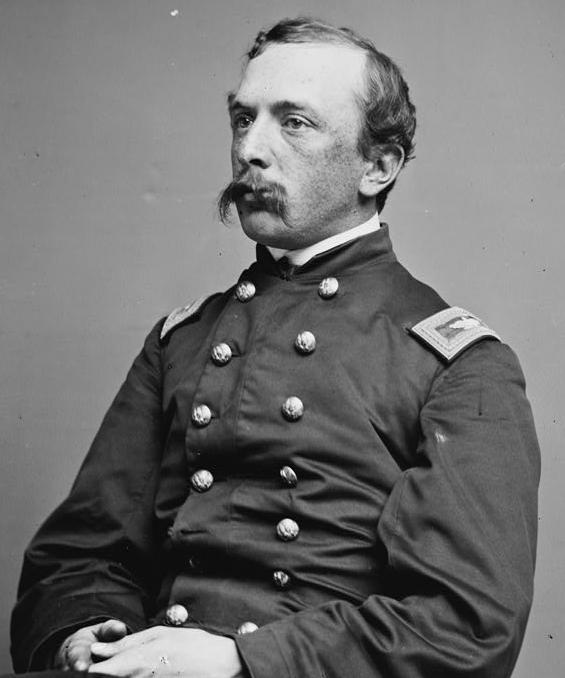
- Col. Francis Fessenden
- Born: March 18, 1839; Portland, Maine, US
- Died: January 2, 1906 (aged 66); Portland, Maine, US
- Burial place: Evergreen Cemetery, Portland, Maine
- Relatives: William P. Fessenden (father); James D. Fessenden (brother); Samuel C. Fessenden (uncle); T. A. D. Fessenden (uncle)
- Military career
- Allegiance: United States of America; Union
- Branch: United States Army; Union Army
- Service years: 1861–1866
- Rank: Brigadier General (Regular Army); Major General
- Commands: 25th Maine Volunteer Infantry Regiment; 30th Maine Volunteer Infantry Regiment; 1st Division of the Department of West Virginia
- Conflicts: American Civil War; Battle of Shiloh; Red River Campaign

Mayor of Portland, Maine
- In office 1876–1876

Personal details
- Resting place: Evergreen Cemetery
- Party: Republican
- Education: Bowdoin College (1858); Harvard Law School
- Occupation: Lawyer

Francis Fessenden (March 18, 1839 – January 2, 1906) was an American lawyer, politician, and soldier from the state of Maine who served as a general in the Union Army during the American Civil War. He was a member of the powerful Fessenden family, which was prominent in national politics during the mid-19th century.

== Early life and career ==
Francis Fessenden was born in Portland, Maine, in the spring of 1839. He was the son of U.S. Senator William P. Fessenden and a brother of James Deering Fessenden, who would also serve as a general in the Union army. Another brother, Samuel, would be killed at the Second Battle of Bull Run during the war. Two uncles, Samuel C. Fessenden and T. A. D. Fessenden were U.S. Congressmen.

He was educated in the local schools and then graduated from Bowdoin College in 1858. He studied law at the Harvard Law School, passed his bar exam, and joined his father's law firm.

== Civil War ==
Following the outbreak of the Civil War, Fessenden received a commission as a captain in the Regular Army in the newly raised 19th U.S. Infantry on May 14, 1861. He spent much of the year as a recruiting officer, helping raise additional troops.

In January 1862, he assumed duties as a line officer in the Army of the Cumberland in Tennessee and was severely wounded at the April 1862 Battle of Shiloh. He became the colonel of the 25th Maine Infantry and commanded a brigade as part of the 22nd Army Corps in the defenses of Washington, D.C. He was married that year to Ellen Winslow, a daughter of Edward Fox of Portland.

In July 1863, his term of enlistment in the volunteer Union army expired and he reverted to his rank of captain of the 19th U.S. Infantry in the Regular Army. In September, Fessenden was appointed as the colonel of the 30th Maine Veteran Infantry.

On May 10, 1864, he was promoted to the rank of brigadier general and served later that year in command of a brigade in the army of Nathaniel P. Banks in the Red River Campaign. He saw action in several battles in that campaign, including Sabine Crossroads, Pleasant Hill, and Monet's Ferry, where he led a major assault in which he suffered a severe leg wound that necessitated amputation. After convalescing, he was assigned to administrative duty for the rest of the war, commanding various garrisons and supply trains.

== Postbellum career ==
Following the end of the war, Fessenden stayed in the army. He served on the military commission that oversaw the war crimes trial of Henry Wirz, who was executed for his controversial actions while commanding the Andersonville Prison in Georgia. He also served as the president of a military court of inquiry. He was promoted to major general of volunteers on November 19, 1865, and assigned command of the 1st Division of the Department of West Virginia. He was subsequently assigned to the 1st Veteran Corps.

He served in the Bureau of Refugees, Freedmen and Abandoned Lands in 1866. He declined an appointment as the lieutenant colonel of the 45th U.S. Infantry in August 1866. Later that year, he was transferred to the 28th U.S. Infantry during the sweeping reorganisation of the army. He retired from the Regular Army on November 1, 1866, with the rank of brigadier general. Fessenden then returned home to Portland and resumed his legal career. He was elected as the city's mayor in 1876. He was a Republican. He wrote a biography of his father, The Life and Services of William Pitt Fessenden, which was published in 1907.

He was a Companion of the First Class of the Maine Commandery of the Military Order of the Loyal Legion of the United States - a military society for officers who has served the Union during the Civil War. On October 28, 1881, he was elected commander of the Maine Commandery. He was also a member of the General Society of Colonial Wars.

Francis Fessenden died in Portland, where he is buried in Evergreen Cemetery.

== Family tree ==
Fessenden family tree

William Fessenden (1694–1756)	Martha Brown (1699–1746)
William Fessenden (1718–1758)	Thomas Fessenden (1739–1813)
William Fessenden (1747–1805)	Thomas G. Fessenden (1771–1837)	William Fessenden (1779–1815)
Samuel Fessenden (1784–1869)	Sarah Fessenden (1808–1845)	Elisha Hunt Allen (1804–1883)
Ellen M. Deering (1809-1857)	William P. Fessenden (1808–1869)	Samuel C. Fessenden (1815–1881)	Hewett Fessenden (1819–1885)	T. A. D. Fessenden (1826–1868)	William Fessenden Allen (1831–1906)
James Deering Fessenden (1833–1897)	Francis Fessenden (1839–1907)	Samuel Fessenden (1847–1908)	Nicholas Fessenden (1847-1927)
Stirling Fessenden (1875-1944)

== See also ==
- List of American Civil War generals (Union)
