= Charles W. Walton (Maine politician) =

American judge

Charles Wesley Walton
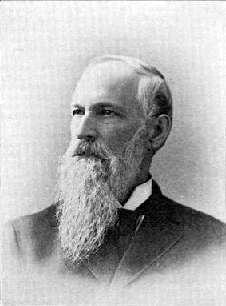

Member of the U.S. House of Representatives from Maine's 2nd district
- In office March 4, 1861 – May 26, 1862
- Preceded by: John J. Perry
- Succeeded by: Thomas Fessenden

Associate Justice of the Maine Supreme Judicial Court
- In office May 14, 1862 – May 14, 1897
- Preceded by: Seth May
- Succeeded by: Albert R. Savage

Personal details
- Born: December 9, 1819 Mexico, Massachusetts, U.S.
- Died: January 24, 1900 (aged 80) Portland, Maine, U.S.
- Resting place: Evergreen Cemetery
- Party: Republican
- Profession: Lawyer

Charles Wesley Walton (December 9, 1819 – January 24, 1900) was a United States representative from Maine. He was born in Mexico, Massachusetts (now Maine) where he attended the common schools and was also instructed at home and by private tutors. He studied law, was admitted to the bar in Oxford, Maine in 1841, and commenced practice in Mexico, Maine, in 1843.

Walton also practiced law in Dixfield, Maine and was the attorney for Oxford County, Maine 1847–1851. He moved to Auburn, Maine, in 1855 and continued the practice of law and was the attorney for Androscoggin County, Maine 1857–1860.

Walton was elected as a Republican to the 37th United States Congress and served from March 4, 1861, to May 26, 1862, when he resigned to accept a judicial appointment. He was the associate justice of the Maine Supreme Judicial Court 1862-1897 and was not a candidate for reappointment as his last term ended. He resided in Portland, Maine, until his death on January 24, 1900. He was buried in Evergreen Cemetery.

U.S. House of Representatives
Preceded by John J. Perry	Member of the U.S. House of Representatives from Maine's 2nd congressional district March 4, 1861 – May 26, 1862	Succeeded by Thomas Fessenden
