= William Little Lee =

American judge (1821–1857)

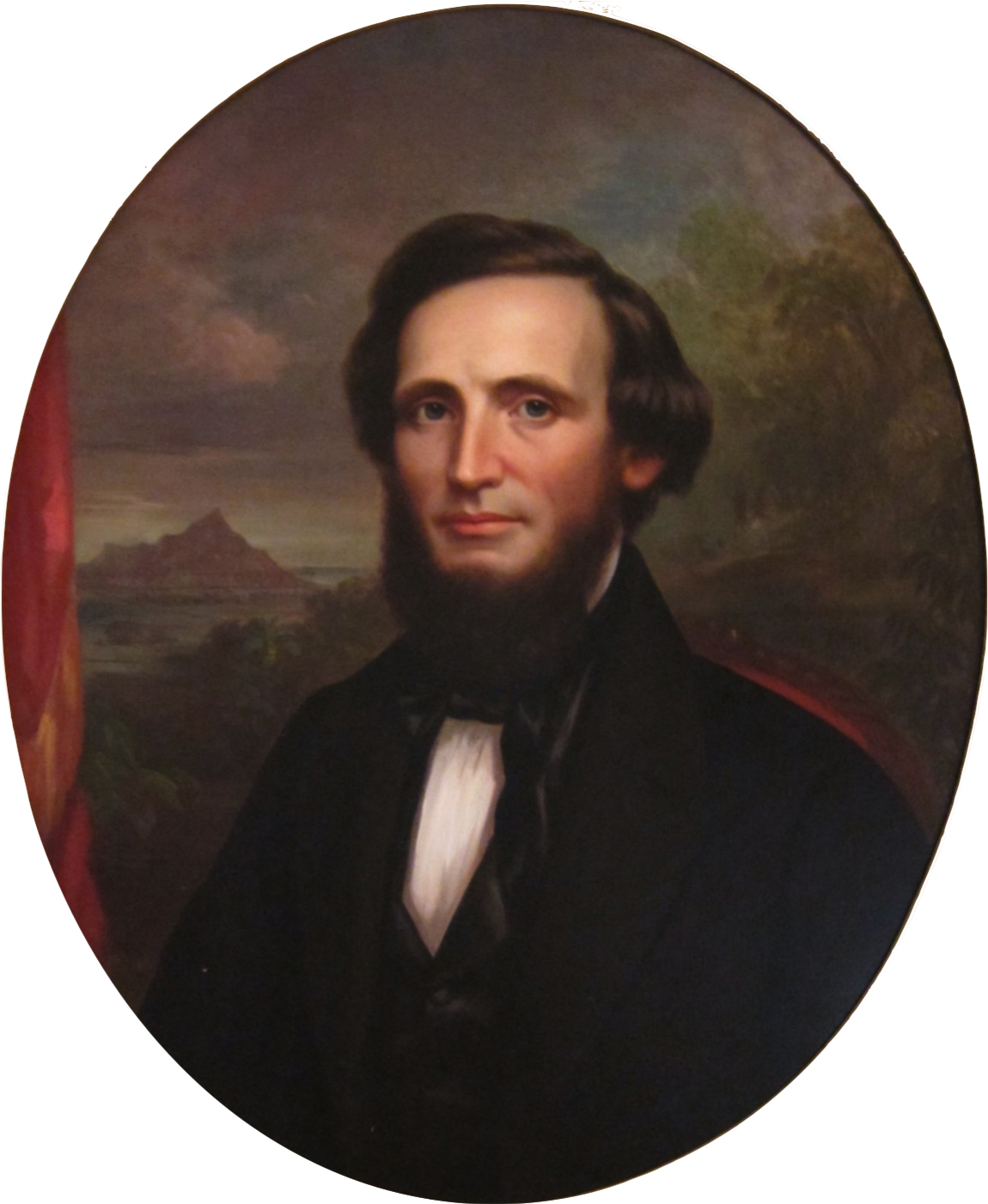
- Portrait of William Little Lee, Aliʻiōlani Hale
- Born: February 25, 1821; Sandy Hill, New York
- Died: May 28, 1857 (aged 36); Honolulu, Hawaii
- Occupation: Judge
- Spouse: Catherine Elizabeth Newton
- Parent(s): Stephen Lee; Mary Little

William Little Lee (February 25, 1821 – May 28, 1857) was an American lawyer who became the first chief justice of the Supreme Court for the Kingdom of Hawaii.

== Life ==
William Little Lee was born February 25, 1821, in Sandy Hill, New York. His father was Colonel Stephen Lee (1773–1856) and mother was Mary Little (1795–1881). He graduated from Norwich University in 1842. He taught in a military school established by Alden Partridge in Portsmouth, Virginia, for one year, and then graduated from Harvard Law School. One of his teachers at Harvard was Joseph Story, who was sitting on the Supreme Court of the United States at the time. He practiced law in Troy, New York, but convinced his boyhood friend Charles Reed Bishop to travel with him to the Oregon Territory in February 1846 on the ship Henry.

The ship was damaged while passing around Cape Horn, and needed to stop at the Hawaiian Islands for provisions and repairs on October 12. Lee was only the second person in Hawaii with any western-style law training. John Ricord had arrived just two years earlier, and was acting as attorney general. Ricord convinced Lee to stay, and Bishop was given the job of sorting out the defunct Ladd & Co. which was also the center of a long-lasting legal dispute. A related land dispute by Richard Charlton had caused a British military occupation a few years earlier called the Paulet Affair which was still being sorted out.

On December 1, 1846, he was appointed judge of the island of Oʻahu, and served on the Privy Council of King Kamehameha III for the rest of his life. Ricord left in 1847 and Lee had to finish drafting legislation to formalize the court system. Called the "third organic act" or "act to Organize the Judiciary Department" it was passed September 7, 1847, activated January 10, 1848. Starting in 1847 he became a member of a commission to quiet land titles that led to legislation known as the Great Mahele which formalized fee simple ownership of real estate. On January 16, 1848, he was named Chief Justice of the Superior Court. On March 11, 1849, he married Catherine Newton (c. 1819–1894), and became a boarder in Washington Place with John Owen Dominis and Dominis' mother. Lee had proposed by letter, and they were married aboard the Leland by Rev. Samuel C. Damon.

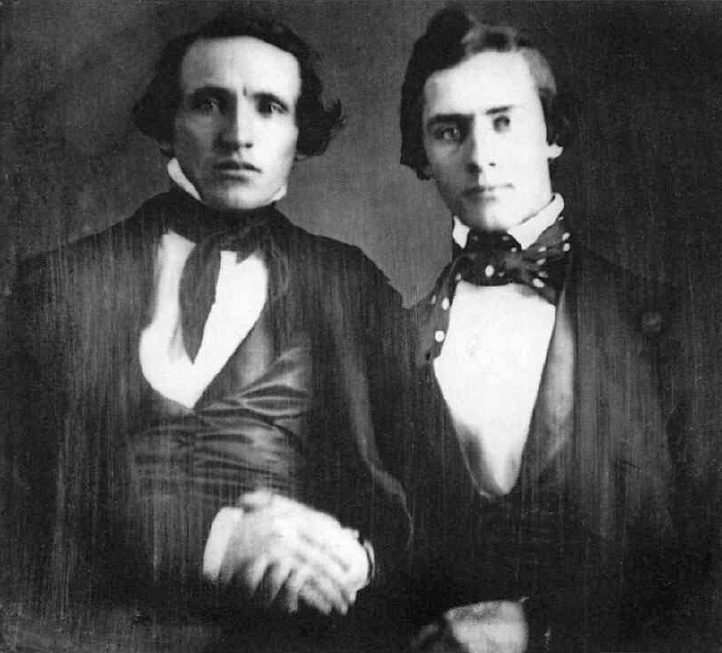
Lee on left, with Charles Reed Bishop in 1846

On August 12, 1849, French admiral Louis Tromelin staged a French Invasion of Honolulu. On August 28 Lee and chief government minister Gerrit P. Judd went aboard the French ship for an attempted peace conference. However, Tromelin continued to sack the city before sailing off with the king's yacht and other plunder. Judd and two young princes were sent to Europe to negotiate treaties, stopping in the United States on the way. Judd advocated annexation by the United States to protect against further actions by British and French. Lee was more in favor of a simple treaty of Reciprocity. Former Scottish physician, now Foreign Minister Robert Crichton Wyllie agreed, and former Hawaiian newspaper publisher James Jackson Jarves negotiated a treaty with John M. Clayton signed on December 20, 1849.

In 1851 Lee was elected to the House of Representatives in the legislature of the Hawaiian Kingdom. Lee helped draft the 1852 Constitution of the Kingdom of Hawaii and a judiciary bill to implement its provisions. Lorrin Andrews and John Papa ʻĪʻī became associate justices and Lee chief justice of what was now called the Supreme Court.

On December 15, 1854, Kamehameha III died; his nephew took the throne as Kamehameha IV. On January 15, 1855, Lee was named chancellor, and in March 1855 to 1856 served as an envoy to the United States where he traveled for medical advice. Lee and his wife first went to San Francisco where he met with California's first senator William M. Gwin. On July 10, 1855, they arrived in Washington, D.C., and he met with William L. Marcy and then President Franklin Pierce. Marcy and Lee agreed on terms on July 20, 1855. He also met with representatives of other governments, but could not get them to sign on to a multi-party treaty. In September he returned to Hawaii.

However, the treaty never went into effect, because it was never ratified by the Senate. His health declined, and he returned to Honolulu. He had probably been suffering from tuberculosis. After his death May 28, 1857, fellow American Elisha Hunt Allen became chief justice, who would also try to push the treaty through. His widow Catherine Newton traveled back to New York and in 1861 married Edward L. Youmans, the founder of Popular Science. She used income from the sugarcane plantation to help support the magazine in its early years.

== See also ==
- Supreme Court of Hawaii

Government offices
Preceded by First	Kingdom of Hawaii Chief Justice; 1848–1857	Succeeded by Elisha Hunt Allen
