= United States Congressional Joint Committee on Reconstruction =

Post-American Civil War congressional committee

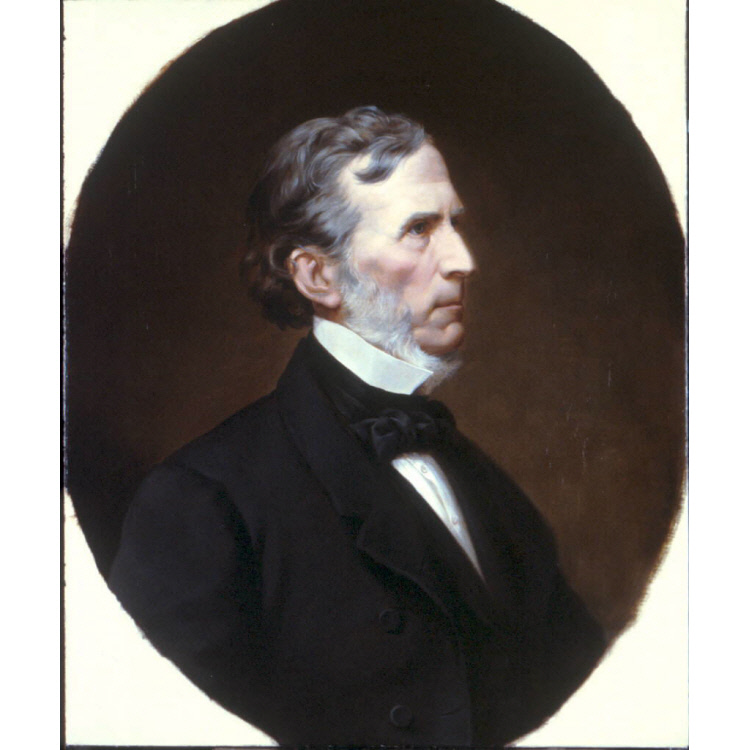
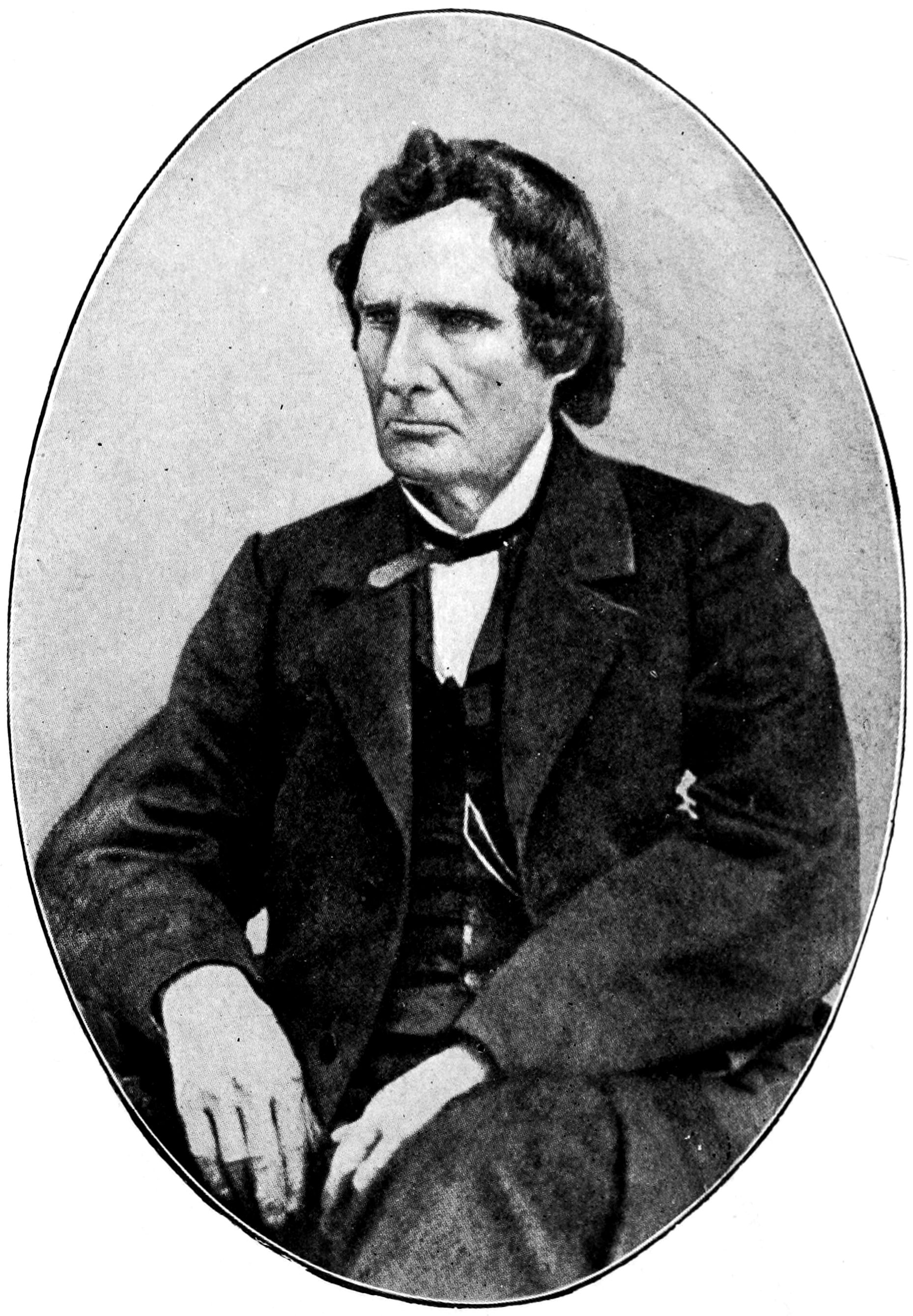
Co-Chairmen William P. Fessenden (left) and Thaddeus Stevens (right)

The Joint Committee on Reconstruction, also known as the Joint Committee of Fifteen, was a joint committee of the 39th United States Congress that played a major role in Reconstruction in the wake of the American Civil War. It was created to "inquire into the condition of the States which formed the so-called Confederate States of America, and report whether they, or any of them, are entitled to be represented in either house of Congress.”

This committee also drafted the Fourteenth Amendment to the United States Constitution, though the full Congress later made some changes. The committee successfully recommended that Congress refuse to readmit southern states to representation in Congress until they ratified the Fourteenth Amendment.

A similar House Select Committee on Reconstruction existed in the House during the 40th and 41st Congresses. A similar Senate committee, the United States Senate Select Committee on the Removal of Political Disabilities, was created during the 41st Congress.

== Establishment and composition ==
Map of the division of the states toward the end of the American Civil War (1861–1865). Blue indicates the Union states, including five border states in light blue. Red represents the Confederate States of America. Uncolored areas were territories.

The committee was established on December 13, 1865, after both houses reached agreement on an amended version of a House concurrent resolution introduced by Representative Thaddeus Stevens of Pennsylvania to establish a joint committee of 15 members. Stevens and Senator William P. Fessenden of Maine served as co-chairmen. The joint committee divided into four subcommittees to hear testimony and gather evidence. The first subcommittee handled Tennessee, the second Virginia and the Carolinas, the third Georgia, Alabama, Mississippi, and Arkansas, and the fourth Florida, Louisiana, and Texas. In all, 144 witnesses were called to testify.

The joint committee included nine members from the House, and six from the Senate. The House members were Stevens, Elihu Washburne, Justin Morrill, John A. Bingham, Roscoe Conkling, George Boutwell, Henry Blow, Henry Grider, and Andrew Jackson Rogers. The Senate members were Fessenden, James W. Grimes, Jacob Howard, George Henry Williams, Ira Harris, and Reverdy Johnson.

== Journal and report ==
The committee's decisions were recorded in its journal, but the journal did not reveal the committee's debates or discussions, which were deliberately kept secret. Once the committee had completed work on the proposed Fourteenth Amendment, several of its members spoke out, including Senator Howard, who gave a long speech to the full Senate in which he presented "in a very succinct way, the views and the motives which influenced that committee, so far as I understand those views and motives."

The joint committee also produced a report after Congress had already given final approval to send the draft Fourteenth Amendment to the states for ratification, and the report was widely disseminated. The report was signed by 12 of the committee's members, and a minority report was signed by the other three: Johnson, Rogers, and Grider. The Joint Committee on Reconstruction was not revived at the next Congress.

== Bibliography ==
- Belz, Herman. A New Birth of Freedom: The Republican Party and Freedman's Rights, 1861–1866 (2000).
- Blaine, James G. Twenty Years of Congress: From Lincoln to Garfield. With a review of the events which led to the political revolution of 1860 (1893)
- Donald, David. Charles Sumner and the Rights of Man (1970), critical analysis, balanced perspective.
- Donald, David. Lincoln (1996).
- Dunning, William Archibald. Reconstruction: Political & Economic, 1865-1877 (1905) Dunning School.
- Foner, Eric. Reconstruction: America's Unfinished Revolution, 1863-1877 (1988).
- Goodwin, Doris Kearns. Team of Rivals: The Political Genius of Abraham Lincoln (2005).
- Harris, William C. With Charity for All: Lincoln and the Restoration of the Union (1997).
- Jellison, Charles A. Fessenden of Maine, Civil War Senator (1962), the committee's chairman
- Mantell, Martin E. Johnson, Grant, and the Politics of Reconstruction (1973)
- National Archives Records of Congress. Existing records in the National Archives contain part of the committee report, as well as a few petitions concerning restoration of the former Confederate states to representation in Congress. The petitions are from Iowa, Kansas, Ohio, and Pennsylvania. There is also a resolution of the New York Legislature regarding this issue and advocating equality of suffrage in the District of Columbia for all adult males. National Archives records also include information about a United States House Select Committee on Reconstruction established in July 1867, but that was an entirely separate committee from the Joint Committee on Reconstruction which by that time no longer existed.
- Perman, Michael Emancipation and reconstruction (2003), a synthesis of recent historical literature on emancipation and reconstruction.
- Randall, James G. Lincoln the President: Last Full Measure (1955).
- Rhodes, James G. History of the United States from the Compromise of 1850 to the McKinley-Bryan Campaign of 1896. Volume: 6. (1920) 1865–72, detailed narrative. Vol 7, 1872–77.
- Stampp, Kenneth M. The Era of Reconstruction, 1865–1877 (1967).
- Simpson. Brooks D. Let Us Have Peace: Ulysses S. Grant and the Politics of War and Reconstruction, 1861–1868 (1991).
- Trefousse, Hans L. Thaddeus Stevens: Nineteenth-Century Egalitarian (2001).
- Trefousse, Hans L. Andrew Johnson: A Biography (1989).
