= Nathan A. Farwell =

American politician (1812–1893)

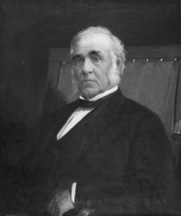

United States Senator from Maine
- In office October 27, 1864 – March 3, 1865
- Preceded by: William P. Fessenden
- Succeeded by: William P. Fessenden

Member of the Maine House of Representatives
- In office 1860; 1863-1864

Member of the Maine Senate
- In office 1853-1854; 1861-1862

Personal details
- Born: Nathan Allen Farwell; February 24, 1812 Unity, Massachusetts, (now in Maine), U.S.
- Died: December 9, 1893 (aged 81) Rockland, Maine, U.S.
- Party: Republican

Nathan Allen Farwell (February 24, 1812 – December 9, 1893) was a politician, businessman and United States Senator from Maine.

== Life and career ==
Born in Unity, then in Massachusetts but now in Maine, he attended the common schools and then taught school from 1832 to 1833. He moved to East Thomaston, Maine, in 1834 and engaged in the manufacture of lime and in shipbuilding. Farwell subsequently became a master mariner and trader. He then studied law and moved to Rockland, Maine, where he founded the Rockland Marine Insurance Co., and served as president, as well as practicing law in that city. He traveled in Europe from 1845 to 1847.

He was a member of the Maine State Senate from 1853 to 1854 and again from 1861 to 1862, serving the last year as presiding officer. He was a member of the Maine House of Representatives in 1860 and again from 1863 to 1864. He was a delegate to the Baltimore Republican National Convention in 1864, and in that year was appointed to the U.S. Senate as a Republican for the unexpired term of William Pitt Fessenden. He served in that body from October 27, 1864, to March 3, 1865, but was not a candidate for reelection in 1865. At that time he resumed his activities in the insurance business. He was delegate to the National Union Convention in Philadelphia in 1866.

Farwell died in Rockland, Maine, and is buried in Achorn Cemetery in Rockland. He was the cousin of Owen Lovejoy and Elijah P. Lovejoy.

== Notes ==
- United States Congress. "Nathan A. Farwell (id: F000038)". Biographical Directory of the United States Congress. Retrieved on 2009-5-13

U.S. Senate
Preceded by William P. Fessenden	U.S. senator (Class 1) from Maine; 1864–1865; Served alongside: Lot M. Morrill	Succeeded by William P. Fessenden
