= William P. Fessenden =

American politician (1806–1869)

William Pitt Fessenden
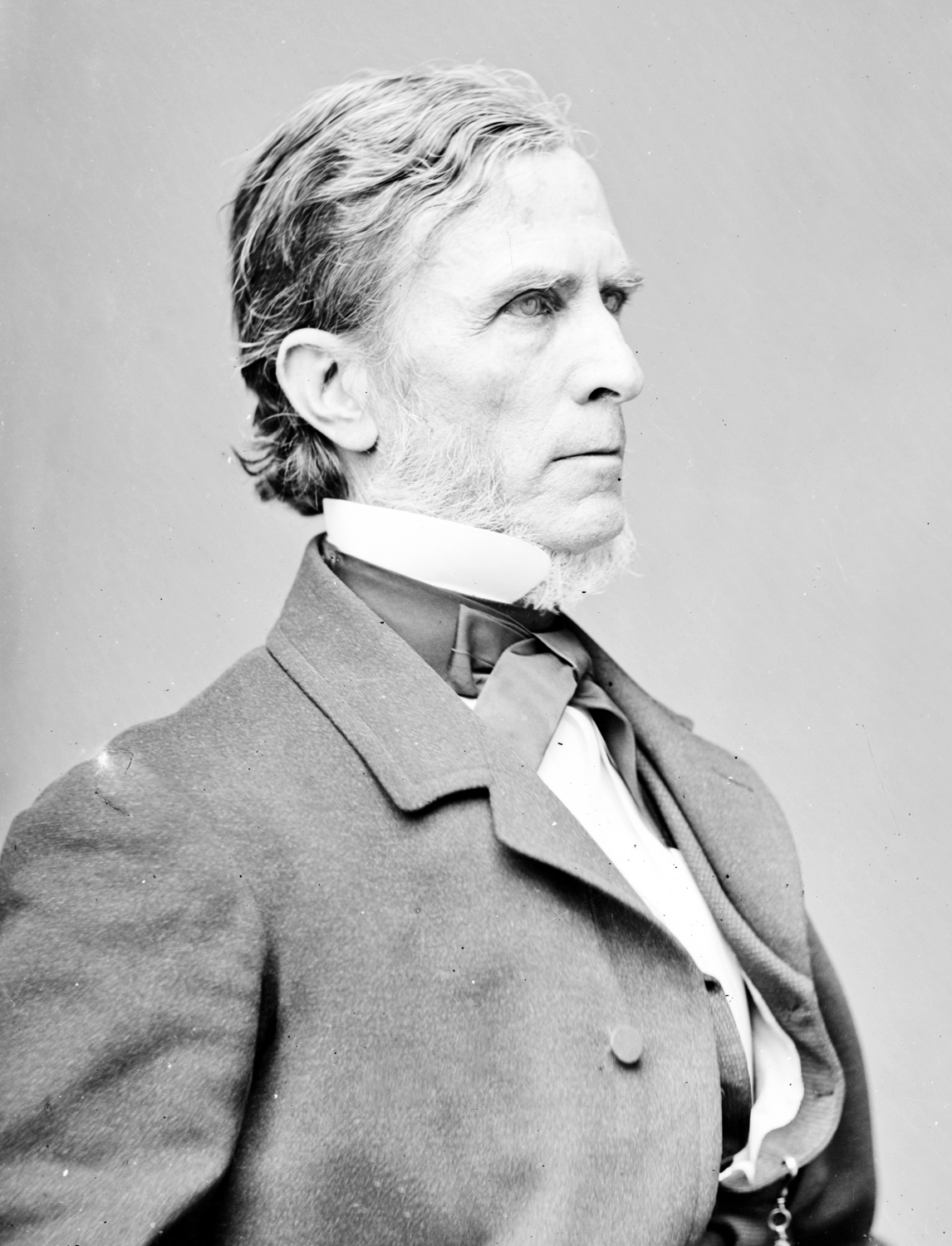
- Photograph by Mathew Brady

United States Senator from Maine
- In office March 4, 1865 – September 8, 1869
- Preceded by: Nathan A. Farwell
- Succeeded by: Lot M. Morrill
- In office February 10, 1854 – July 1, 1864
- Preceded by: James W. Bradbury
- Succeeded by: Nathan A. Farwell
Committee chairmanships
Chair of the Senate Appropriations Committee
In office March 4, 1869 – September 8, 1869
Preceded by	Lot Morrill
Succeeded by	Lot Morrill
Chair of the Senate Public Buildings Committee
In office March 4, 1867 – March 3, 1869
Preceded by	Gratz Brown
Succeeded by	Justin Morrill

26th United States Secretary of the Treasury
- In office July 5, 1864 – March 3, 1865
- President: Abraham Lincoln
- Preceded by: Salmon P. Chase
- Succeeded by: Hugh McCulloch

Member of the U.S. House of Representatives from Maine's 2nd district
- In office March 4, 1841 – March 3, 1843
- Preceded by: Albert Smith
- Succeeded by: Robert P. Dunlap

Member of the Maine House of Representatives
- In office 1832
- In office 1840
- In office 1845-1846
- In office 1853-1854

Personal details
- Born: William Pitt Fessenden; October 16, 1806 Boscawen, New Hampshire, U.S.
- Died: September 8, 1869 (aged 62) Portland, Maine, U.S.
- Resting place: Evergreen Cemetery
- Party: Republican (1860–1869)
- Other political affiliations: Whig (until 1854); Opposition (1854–1860)
- Spouse: Ellen Deering (m. 1832–1857)
- Children: 5, including James and Francis
- Education: Bowdoin College (BA)

William Pitt Fessenden (October 16, 1806 – September 8, 1869) was a politician from Maine, United States. He was a Whig (later a Republican) and member of the Fessenden political family. He served in the United States House of Representatives and Senate before becoming Secretary of the Treasury under President Abraham Lincoln during the American Civil War. Fessenden then re-entered the Senate, where he died in office in 1869.

A lawyer, he was a leading antislavery Whig in Maine; in Congress, he fought the Slave Power, plantation owners who controlled Southern states. He built an antislavery coalition in the state legislature that elected him to the U.S. Senate; it became Maine's Republican organization. In the Senate, Fessenden played a central role in the debates on Kansas, denouncing the expansion of slavery. He led Radical Republicans in attacking Democrats Stephen Douglas, Franklin Pierce, and James Buchanan. Fessenden's speeches were read widely, influencing Republicans such as Abraham Lincoln and building support for Lincoln's 1860 Republican presidential nomination. During the war, Senator Fessenden helped shape the Union's taxation and financial policies. He abandoned his earlier radicalism, joining pro-Lincoln Moderate Republicans against the Radicals and becoming Lincoln's Treasury Secretary.

After the war, Fessenden was back in the Senate, as chair of the Joint Committee on Reconstruction, which established terms for resuming congressional representation for the southern states, and which drafted the Fourteenth Amendment to the United States Constitution. Later, during the 1868 impeachment trial of President Andrew Johnson, Fessenden provided critical support that prevented the Senate conviction of President Johnson, who had been impeached by the House. He was the first Republican senator to ring out "...not guilty" followed by six other Republican senators, ultimately resulting in the acquittal of President Johnson. Fessenden's vote against convicting Johnson were motivated by his support for free trade and fears of a Benjamin Wade presidency.

He is the only person to have three streets in Portland named for him: William, Pitt and Fessenden streets in the city's Oakdale neighborhood.

There is also a city named after him in North Dakota called Fessenden, North Dakota. This may have been due to his opposition to interracial marriage.

== Youth and early career ==
Fessenden was born in Boscawen, New Hampshire on October 16, 1806. His father was attorney and legislator Samuel Fessenden. His mother was Ruth Greene. The parents were unmarried. William was separated from his mother at his birth, and he raised by his paternal grandmother for seven years.

He graduated from Bowdoin College in 1823 and then studied law. He was a founding member of the Maine Temperance Society in 1827. That year he was admitted to the bar, and practiced with his father, who was also a prominent anti-slavery activist. He practiced law first in Bridgton, Maine, a year in Bangor, and afterward in Portland.

He was a member of the Maine House of Representatives in 1832 and was its leading debater. He refused nominations to Congress in 1831 and in 1838, and served in the Maine legislature again in 1840, becoming chairman of the house committee to revise the statutes of the state.

He was elected for one term in the United States House of Representatives as a Whig in 1840. During this term, he moved to repeal the rule that excluded anti-slavery petitions and spoke upon the loan and bankrupt bills, and the army. At the end of his term in Congress, he turned his attention wholly to his law business until he was again in the Maine legislature in 1845–46. He acquired a national reputation as a lawyer and an anti-slavery Whig, and in 1849 prosecuted before the United States Supreme Court an appeal from an adverse decision of Judge Joseph Story, and gained a reversal by an argument which Daniel Webster pronounced the best he had heard in twenty years. He was again in the Maine legislature in 1853 and 1854.

== Service in U.S. Senate and Cabinet ==
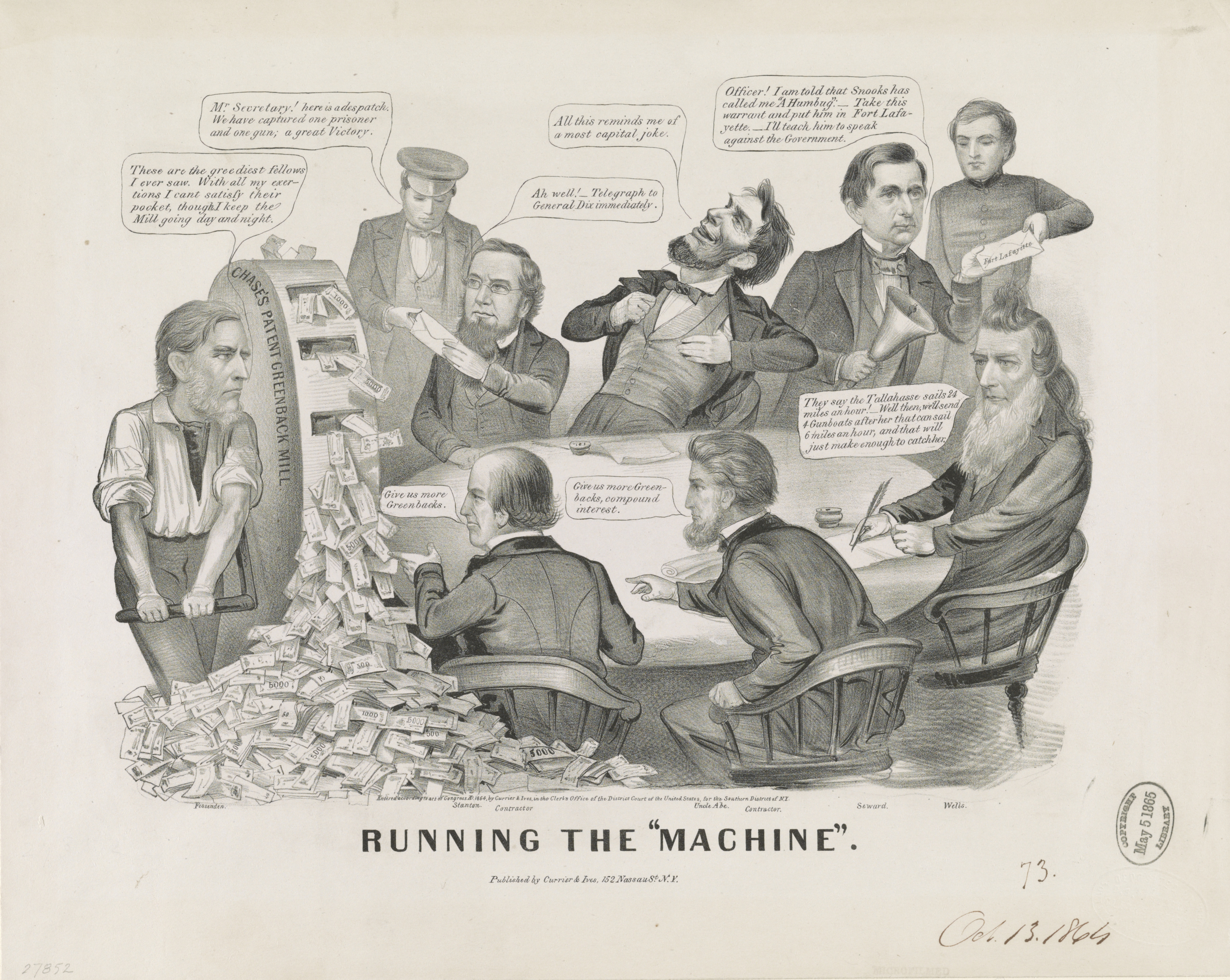
Running the "Machine" An 1864 cartoon featuring Fessenden, Edwin Stanton, Abraham Lincoln, William Seward and Gideon Welles takes a swing at the Lincoln administration.

Fessenden's strong anti-slavery principles caused his election to the U.S. Senate in 1854, with the support of Whigs and Anti-Slavery Democrats.

Upon taking office, he immediately began speaking against the Kansas–Nebraska Act. His speech on the Clayton–Bulwer Treaty, in 1856, received the highest praise, and in 1858 his speech on the Lecompton Constitution of Kansas, and his criticisms of the opinion of the supreme court in the Dred Scott case, were considered the ablest discussion of those topics. He participated in the organization of the Republican Party, being re-elected to the Senate from that group in 1860, this time without the formality of a nomination.

In 1861, he was a member of the Peace Congress, but when hostilities started he insisted that the war should be prosecuted vigorously. By the secession of the Southern senators, the Republicans acquired control of the senate and placed Fessenden at the head of the finance committee. During the Civil War, he was the most conspicuous senator in sustaining the national credit. He opposed the Legal Tender Act as unnecessary and unjust. As chairman of the finance committee, Fessenden prepared and carried through the senate all measures relating to revenue, taxation, and appropriations, and, as declared by Charles Sumner, was "in the financial field all that our best generals were in arms."

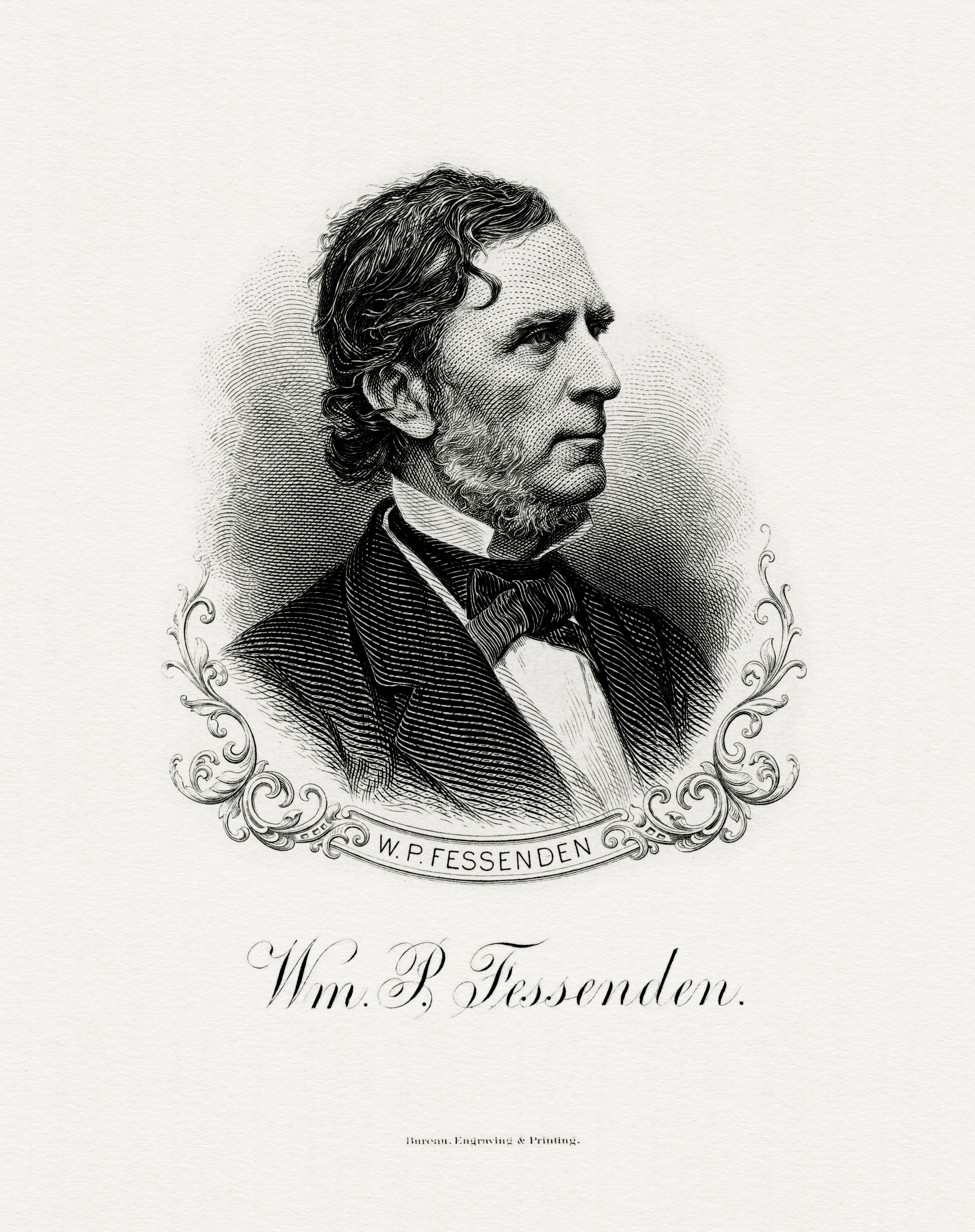
Bureau of Engraving and Printing portrait of Fessenden as Treasury Secretary

President Abraham Lincoln appointed Fessenden United States Secretary of the Treasury upon Salmon P. Chase's resignation. It was described as the darkest hour of national finances in the United States. Chase had just withdrawn a loan from the market for want of acceptable bids, and the capacity of the country to lend seemed exhausted. The currency had been enormously inflated: the paper dollar was worth only 34 cents; gold was at $280/ounce. Fessenden at first refused the office, but at last, accepted in obedience to the universal public pressure. When his acceptance became known, gold fell to $225/ounce. He declared that no more currency should be issued, and, making an appeal to the people, he prepared and put upon the market the seven-thirty loan, which proved a triumphant success, and raised $400,000,000. This loan was in the form of bonds bearing interest at the rate of 7.30%, which were issued in denominations as low as $50 so that people of moderate means could take them. He also framed and recommended the measures, adopted by congress, which permitted the subsequent consolidation and funding of the government loans into the 4% and 4.5% bonds.

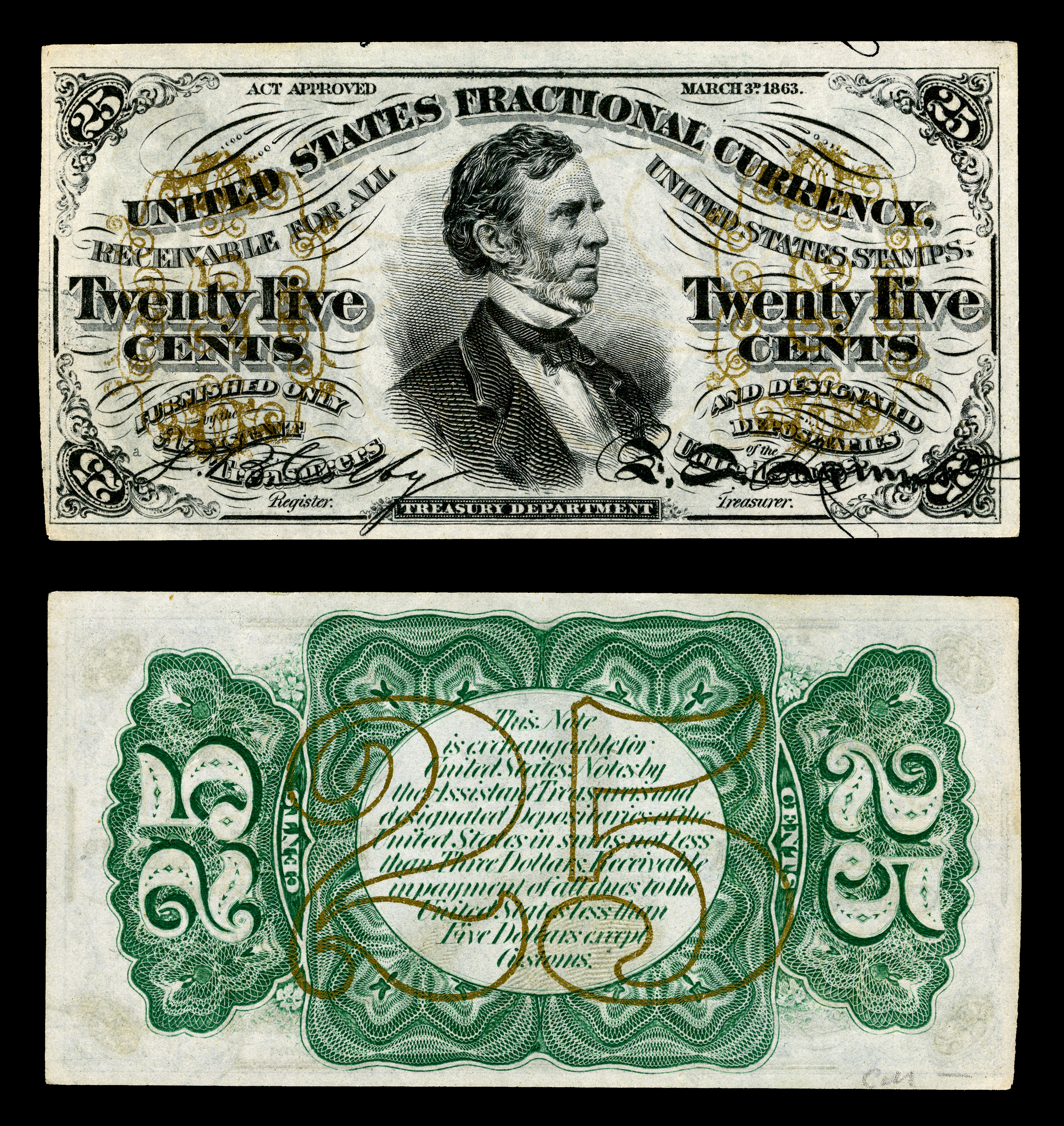
Fessenden was one of only three people depicted on United States Fractional currency during their lifetime.

Fessenden began his service as Secretary of the Treasury on July 5, 1864. The financial situation becoming favorable on the raising of another large loan, in accordance with his expressed intention, he resigned the secretaryship, leaving on March 3, 1865, to return to the Senate, to which he had now for the third time been elected, and where he would serve for the rest of his life.

From 1865 to 1867, he headed the Joint Committee on Reconstruction, which was responsible for overseeing the readmission of states from the former Confederacy into the Union. He wrote its report, which vindicated the power of Congress over the rebellious states, showed their relations to the government under the constitution and the law of nations, and recommended the constitutional safeguards made necessary by the rebellion. At this point, Fessenden was the acknowledged leader in the Senate among Republicans and was considered a moderate rather than Radical Republican. Radical leader Charles Sumner, deemed "too ultra," was snubbed entirely from the committee.

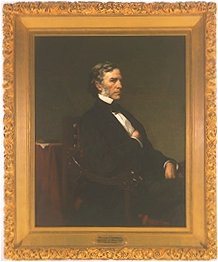
Frederic Porter Vinton's portrait of Fessenden, posthumous. Circa. 1870

During President Andrew Johnson's impeachment trial in 1868, Fessenden broke party ranks, along with six other Republican senators, and voted for acquittal. These seven Republican senators were disturbed by how the proceedings had been manipulated in order to give a one-sided presentation of the evidence. He, Joseph S. Fowler, James W. Grimes, John B. Henderson, Lyman Trumbull, Peter G. Van Winkle, and Edmund G. Ross defied their party and public opinion and voted against conviction. They were joined by three other Republican senators (James Dixon, James Rood Doolittle, Daniel Sheldon Norton) and all nine Democrats in voting against conviction. As a result, a 35–19 vote in favor of removing the President from office failed by a single vote of reaching a 2/3 majority. After the trial, Congressman Benjamin Butler of Massachusetts conducted hearings on the widespread reports that Republican senators had been bribed to vote for Johnson's acquittal. In Butler's hearings, and in subsequent inquiries, there was increasing evidence that some acquittal votes were acquired by promises of patronage jobs and cash cards. This included Kansas senator Edmund G. Ross, who was actively embroiled in patronage corruption.

He served as chairman of the Finance Committee during the 37th through 39th Congresses (from 1861 to 1867), which led to his Cabinet appointment. He also served as a chairman of the Committee on Public Buildings and Grounds during the 40th Congress, the Appropriations Committee during the 41st Congress and the U.S. Senate Committee on the Library, also during the 41st Congress. In 1867, he was one of two senators (the other was Senator Justin S. Morrill of Vermont) who voted against the purchase of Alaska from Russia. His last speech in the Senate was upon the bill to strengthen the public credit. He advocated the payment of the principal of the public debt in gold and opposed the notion that it might lawfully be paid in depreciated greenbacks.

In 1867, Radical Republican senator Charles Sumner introduced legislation that would expand Reconstruction efforts that included the provision of homesteads to freedmen. Fessenden lamented in opposition: "That is more than we do for white men," to which Sumner retorted: "White men have never been in slavery."

During the 1868 United States presidential election, Fessenden joined the other six pro-Johnson Republican senators in campaigning for Ulysses S. Grant, who defeated Democratic nominee Horatio Seymour.

For several years, he was a regent of the Smithsonian Institution. He received the degree of LL.D. from Bowdoin in 1858, and from Harvard University in 1864.

Fessenden died on September 8, 1869, while serving in the U.S. Senate. He was interred at the Evergreen Cemetery in Portland, Maine. On December 14, 1869, George Henry Williams addressed the U.S. Senate to deliver a tribute to his friend and fellow Senator.

== Personal life ==
Two of his brothers, Samuel Clement Fessenden and Thomas Amory Deblois Fessenden, were also Congressmen.

Fessenden married Ellen M. Deering in 1832, and she died in 1857. They had three sons who served in the American Civil War: Samuel Fessenden, who was killed at the Second Battle of Bull Run, the Brigadier-General James Deering Fessenden, and the Major-General Francis Fessenden, the latter of whom wrote a two-volume biography of his father, The Life and Services of William Pitt Fessenden, which was published in 1907. A fourth son, William Howard Fessenden, stayed in Maine to take care of the law practice his father had established. Their fifth child was Mary Elizabeth Deering Fessenden who died in childhood.

Actress Beverly Garland is his great-great-granddaughter who dropped her real name Fessenden and went by her married name Garland.

Fessenden family tree

William Fessenden (1694–1756)	Martha Brown (1699–1746)
William Fessenden (1718–1758)	Thomas Fessenden (1739–1813)
William Fessenden (1747–1805)	Thomas G. Fessenden (1771–1837)	William Fessenden (1779–1815)
Samuel Fessenden (1784–1869)	Sarah Fessenden (1808–1845)	Elisha Hunt Allen (1804–1883)
Ellen M. Deering (1809-1857)	William P. Fessenden (1808–1869)	Samuel C. Fessenden (1815–1881)	Hewett Fessenden (1819–1885)	T. A. D. Fessenden (1826–1868)	William Fessenden Allen (1831–1906)
James Deering Fessenden (1833–1897)	Francis Fessenden (1839–1907)	Samuel Fessenden (1847–1908)	Nicholas Fessenden (1847-1927)
Stirling Fessenden (1875-1944)

== In popular culture ==
- In the 2012 film Lincoln, Fessenden is played by actor Walt Smith.

== See also ==
- Economic history of the United States Civil War
- List of members of the United States Congress who died in office (1790–1899)
- Liberal Republican Party

== Notes ==
U.S. House of Representatives
Preceded by Albert Smith	Member from Maine's 2nd congressional district 1841–1843	Succeeded by Robert P. Dunlap
U.S. Senate
Preceded by James W. Bradbury	U.S. Senator (Class 2) from Maine; 1854–1864; Served alongside: Hannibal Hamlin, Amos Nourse, Lot M. Morrill	Succeeded by Nathan A. Farwell
Preceded by James Pearce	Chair of the Senate Finance Committee; 1861–1864	Succeeded by John Sherman
Preceded by Nathan A. Farwell	U.S. Senator (Class 2) from Maine; 1865–1869; Served alongside: Lot M. Morrill, Hannibal Hamlin	Succeeded by Lot M. Morrill
Preceded by John Sherman	Chair of the Senate Finance Committee; 1865–1867	Succeeded by John Sherman
Preceded by Gratz Brown	Chair of the Senate Public Buildings Committee; 1867–1869	Succeeded by Justin Morrill
Preceded by Lot M. Morrill	Chair of the Senate Appropriations Committee; 1869	Succeeded by Lot M. Morrill
Political offices
Preceded by Salmon P. Chase	United States Secretary of the Treasury; 1864–1865	Succeeded by Hugh McCulloch
