= Samuel Fessenden =

American politician (1784–1869)

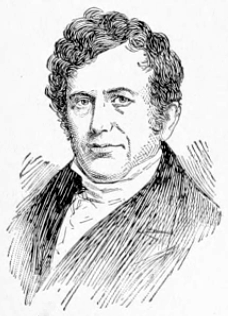

Member of the Massachusetts State Senate
- In office 1818–1819

Member of the Massachusetts House of Representatives
- In office 1815–1816

Personal details
- Born: July 16, 1784 Fryeburg, Massachusetts
- Died: March 13, 1869 (aged 84) Portland, Maine
- Party: Federalist; Liberty; Republican
- Spouse: Deborah Chandler (m. 1813)
- Education: Dartmouth College
- Occupation: Lawyer, politician

Samuel Fessenden (July 16, 1784 – March 13, 1869) was an American attorney, abolitionist, and politician. He served in both houses of the Massachusetts state legislature before Maine became a separate state. He was elected as major general in the state militia. He was considered a leader among his professional peers.

== Biography ==
Fessenden was born on July 16, 1784, in what now is Fryeburg, Maine (until 1820, Maine was part of Massachusetts). His father was the Rev. William Fessenden, who graduated from Harvard College in 1768 and became the first minister of Fryeburg and was active politically, being elected more than once to the Massachusetts state legislature. His father also served as judge of probate.

Fessenden received his early education at Fryeburg Academy in his hometown. He graduated from Dartmouth College in 1806. He then studied law ("read the law") with Judge Dana, of Fryeburg, and Daniel Webster. He was admitted to the bar in 1809.

== Career ==
Fessenden began his law practice at New Gloucester (then part of the state of Massachusetts). He became active in local politics.

In 1815-16, Fessenden was elected and served a term as a representative in the Massachusetts House of Representatives. He then was elected to the Massachusetts State Senate, serving 1818-19. Fessenden also joined the state militia. After leaving the senate, he was elected as major-general of the 12th division of the Massachusetts (later Maine) militia. Maine was separated from Massachusetts in 1820 and admitted to the Union as a separate state as part of the contentious Missouri Compromise.

In 1822, Fessenden moved with his family to Portland, Maine, which offered more opportunities. About 1828, he declined the presidency of Dartmouth College.

Fessenden was an ardent Federalist and one of the early members of the anti-slavery party in Maine. In 1847 and 1848, he was a Liberty Party candidate for United States Congress and governor of Maine. He was an early supporter of the emerging United States Republican Party.

For forty years Fessenden was considered the leader of the bar to which he belonged. He was an active philanthropist. He published two orations and a treatise on the institution, duties, and importance of juries. In 1846, he was awarded the honorary degree of LL.D. by Bowdoin College.

== Family ==
Three of his sons followed Samuel Fessenden into politics: William Pitt Fessenden, who became U. S. Treasury Secretary, and two who were elected as U. S. congressmen, Samuel C. Fessenden, and T. A. D. Fessenden.

His son, William Pitt Fessenden, was born on October 16, 1806, to Ruth Greene, who was not married to Samuel (who was a student at the time). William Pitt was raised by his paternal grandparents for seven years.

Samuel Fessenden married Deborah Chandler in 1813, and they had several children. The family tree displayed below only shows the offspring of William Pitt Fessenden, however. Two of his grandsons through William became generals in the Union Army during the American Civil War: Francis Fessenden and James D. Fessenden. A third grandson, Samuel Fessenden (January 6, 1841 Portland, Maine - September 1, 1862 Centreville, Virginia), was mortally wounded at the Second Battle of Bull Run. He had been graduated from Bowdoin College in 1861. He also began to study law, but soon entered the military service as second lieutenant in the Second Maine Battery, November 30, 1861. He was promoted to first lieutenant on June 3, 1862, and became aide to Gen. Zebulon B. Tower in July 1862.

He died in Portland on March 13, 1869.

Samuel Fessenden's cousin, Thomas Green Fessenden, became a noted author and editor.

Fessenden family tree

William Fessenden (1694–1756)	Martha Brown (1699–1746)
William Fessenden (1718–1758)	Thomas Fessenden (1739–1813)
William Fessenden (1747–1805)	Thomas G. Fessenden (1771–1837)	William Fessenden (1779–1815)
Samuel Fessenden (1784–1869)	Sarah Fessenden (1808–1845)	Elisha Hunt Allen (1804–1883)
Ellen M. Deering (1809-1857)	William P. Fessenden (1808–1869)	Samuel C. Fessenden (1815–1881)	Hewett Fessenden (1819–1885)	T. A. D. Fessenden (1826–1868)	William Fessenden Allen (1831–1906)
James Deering Fessenden (1833–1897)	Francis Fessenden (1839–1907)	Samuel Fessenden (1847–1908)	Nicholas Fessenden (1847-1927)
Stirling Fessenden (1875-1944)

Party political offices
Preceded by James Appleton	Liberty nominee for Governor of Maine; 1845, 1846, 1847, 1848	Succeeded by None
