= Fessenden Nott Otis =

American physician (1825–1900)

- Born: 6 March 1825; Ballston Spa, New York, U.S.
- Died: 24 May 1900 (aged 75); New York City, U.S.
- Known for: urology
- Scientific career
- Fields: medicine

Fessenden Nott Otis (6 March 1825 –24 May 1900) was an American physician, pioneer in the medical field of urology, and art collector. He studied art in New York and was a teacher of drawing and perspective before entering medical school.

== Medical career ==
Otis studied at the University of the City of New York, then at the New York Medical College, from which he graduated in 1852. He worked as a ship's surgeon for the United States Mail and Pacific Mail Steamship Company from 1853 to 1861. Otis became a New York City police surgeon in 1862, and he was the Delmit Dispensary's attending clinician and taught as a clinical lecturer, and later a clinical professor, at the College of Physicians and Surgeons. From 1870 to 1872, he served at the President of the Medical Board of the Police Department, a period that overlapped with his position as President of the Medical Board of the Strangers' Hospital from 1871 to 1873. In 1872, he was also President of the American Dermatological Society.

== Art Education and Collecting ==
Otis primarily collected Japanese bronze sculpture and late-nineteenth-century American landscape paintings. His collection was sold at auction by Ortgies & Co. at the Fifth Avenue Art Galleries, New York, on December 4 and 5, 1890.
