= John M. Fessenden =

American civil engineer

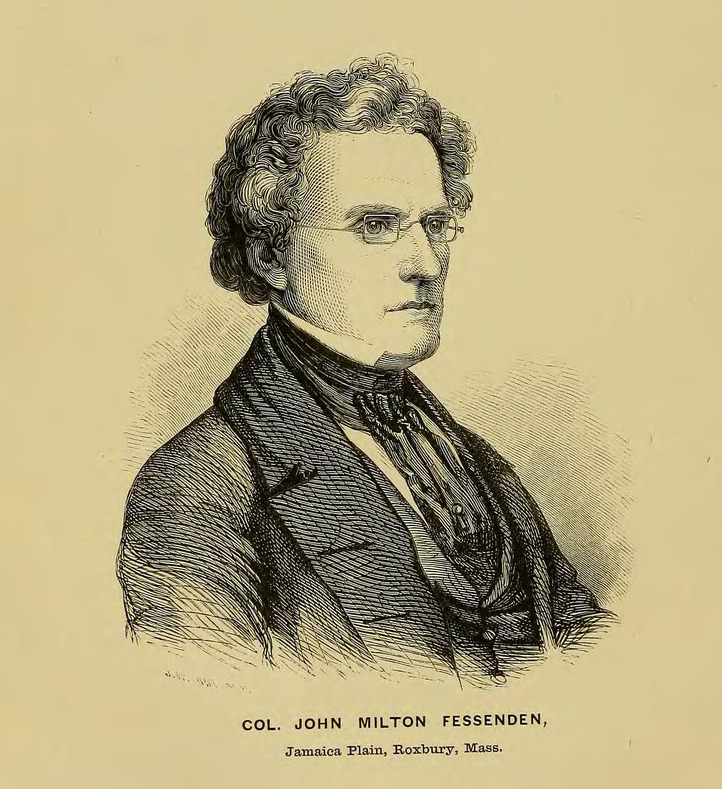
- Born: December 23, 1804; Warren
- Died: February 8, 1883; Washington, D.C.
- Education: United States Military Academy
- Occupation: Civil engineer

John Milton Fessenden (1804—1883) was a prominent American civil engineer in the 19th century.

== Early life and career ==
John Milton Fessenden was born in Warren, Rhode Island, December 23, 1802, and died in Washington, D.C., on February 8, 1883, to John Fessenden (born 1770) and Abigail Miller Child (born 1783). His grandfather, also John Fessenden, was a member of the Massachusetts Provincial Congress during the American revolution and then after the successful introduction of a state constitution, state senator for seven years after the war. Fessenden was appointed to the United States Military Academy and graduated in 1824. In his second year at the academy a remarkable event occurred in his life; the cadet corps marched from West Point to ex-president John Adams' home in Peacefield, near Boston in the summer of 1821 to honor the ailing Adams.

Upon graduation, Fessenden was commissioned a Second Lieutenant in the Corps of Artillery serving first as a topography engineer on the Chesapeake and Ohio Canal (1824‑26) and then at the Kanawha, James, and Roanoke Rivers in 1827, and then on the Baltimore and Ohio Railroad, 1827‑28. While Fessenden went to Europe for the 1828‑29 period, he spent the remainder of his enlistment in garrison at West Point, N.Y., 1829, and then at Fort Jay, N.Y., until he resigned his commission in 1831.

== Marriage and family ==
Fessenden's first wife was Mary Pierce Bumstead, daughter of John and Frances Gore Bumstead of Boston, and they married on May 21, 1834, and produced several children although she died in 1856. Fessenden's second wife was Sarah Ann Murphy, daughter of Dr Robert Murphy of Westmoreland Virginia, on June 25, 1868.

== Civil engineer ==
While Fessenden was chief engineer of the Boston and Worcester Railroad for the 1831‑36 period, later in that same time, he was engineer of record for the initial survey of the Western Railroad corporation (Mass.). Later he consulted with the Boston and Newburyport Railroad, Mass., in 1836‑42; and then the Salisbury and Portsmouth Railroad, N.H., in 1839‑43.

=== Works ===
- Fessenden, J.M. (1836). Report on the surveys and definite location of the Eastern Rail Road. Boston: Eastern Railroad Company – via HathiTrust.

== Political career ==
After his work on engineering for railroads, Fessenden was appointed Railroad Commissioner of the State of Massachusetts for the period of 1845‑47. During this same period he received and honorary degree from Harvard in 1846 and went on to be part of the board of visitors for Lawrence school at Harvard for almost twenty years. Fessenden was appointed by President Millard Fillmore to serve as U.S. Consul at Dresden, Saxony, in 1850‑51 and spent four years there.

== American Civil War ==
During the American Civil War Fessenden held the rank of colonel for the Independent Corps of Cadets of Boston. This militia unit was not called up to fight in the Civil War, but trained young men for various regiments for Massachusetts.

=== Postbellum ===
After the war, Fessenden was appointed a member of Board of Visitors to the Military Academy.

== Death ==
Fessenden died February 8, 1883, in Washington, D.C., and was buried at Princeton Cemetery in Princeton, New Jersey.
