= Samuel C. Fessenden =

American attorney and politician (1815–1882)

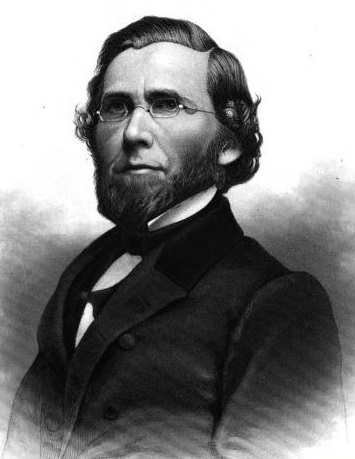

Member of the U.S. House of Representatives from Maine's 3rd district
- In office March 4, 1861 – March 3, 1863
- Preceded by: Ezra B. French
- Succeeded by: James G. Blaine

Personal details
- Born: March 7, 1815 New Gloucester, Massachusetts, U.S.
- Died: April 18, 1882 (aged 67) Stamford, Connecticut, U.S.
- Resting place: Woodland Cemetery in Stamford, Connecticut, U.S.
- Party: Republican
- Spouse: Mary Abigail Grosvenor Abbe
- Children: Joshua Abbe Fessenden; Samuel Fessenden
- Parent: Samuel Fessenden (father)
- Relatives: William Pitt Fessenden (brother); T.A.D. Fessenden (brother); Francis Fessenden (nephew); James D. Fessenden (nephew)
- Education: Bowdoin College (1834); Bangor Theological Seminary (1837)
- Occupation: Pastor; Newspaper proprietor; Lawyer; Judge; Patent examiner; Diplomat

Samuel Clement Fessenden (March 7, 1815 – April 18, 1882) was an American abolitionist and United States Congressman from Maine.

== Early life and education ==
Born in New Gloucester, Massachusetts (now in Maine), Samuel Fessenden graduated from Bowdoin College in 1834 and from Bangor Theological Seminary in 1837.

== Family ==
Samuel Clement Fessenden was the son of prominent abolitionist Samuel Fessenden and brother of Treasury Secretary William Pitt Fessenden and Congressman T. A. D. Fessenden. He was an uncle of Union Army generals Francis Fessenden and James D. Fessenden.

Samuel C. Fessenden married Mary Abigail Grosvenor Abbe. Their son, Joshua Abbe Fessenden, who was born in Rockland, Maine, served in the United States Cavalry beginning in 1862 and was wounded at the Battle of Chickamauga. His other son, Samuel, also born in Rockland, was appointed 2nd lieutenant in the 5th Maine battery on January 18, 1865, and was a lawyer and politician in Stamford, Connecticut.

== Career ==
He was ordained and installed as pastor of the Second Congregational Church of Thomaston, Maine, from 1837 to 1856. He then established the Maine Evangelist and began to study law. He was admitted to the bar and began practicing in 1858, eventually becoming judge of the Rockland municipal court.

He was elected as a Republican to the 37th Congress, serving from March 4, 1861, to March 3, 1863. During his time as a congressman, he continued to be a staunch Unionist and opponent of slavery. After leaving office, he served as an examiner in the United States Patent Office from 1865 to 1879 and then the United States consul at Saint John, New Brunswick, from 1879 to 1881.

== Death ==
Fessenden died in Stamford, Connecticut, in 1882. He is buried in Woodland Cemetery in Stamford, Connecticut.

== Sources ==
- United States Congress. "Samuel C. Fessenden (id: F000097)". Biographical Directory of the United States Congress.
- Wilson, J. G.; Fiske, J., eds. (1900). "Fessenden, Samuel" . Appletons' Cyclopædia of American Biography. New York: D. Appleton.

U.S. House of Representatives
Preceded by Ezra B. French	Member of the U.S. House of Representatives from Maine's 3rd congressional district March 4, 1861 – March 3, 1863	Succeeded by James G. Blaine
