= Elisha H. Allen =

American judge

Elisha Hunt Allen
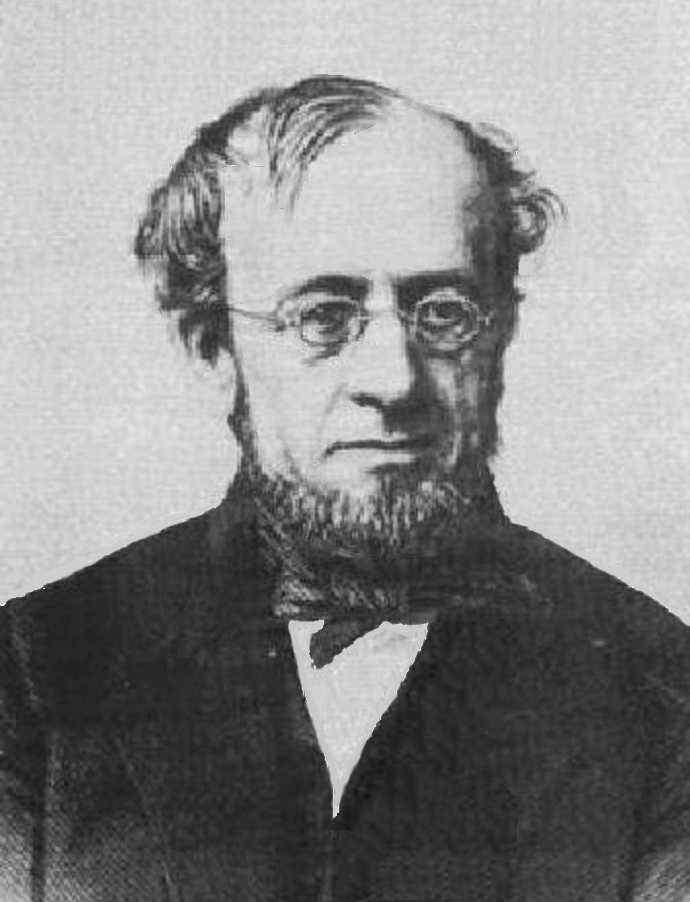

Kingdom of Hawaii Minister to U.S.
- In office 1856–1883
- President: Franklin Pierce; James Buchanan; Abraham Lincoln; Andrew Johnson; Ulysses S. Grant; Rutherford B. Hayes; James Garfield; Chester A. Arthur
- Preceded by: William Little Lee
- Succeeded by: Henry A. P. Carter

Chief Justice of the Supreme Court of The Kingdom of Hawaiʻi
- In office June 4, 1857 – February 22, 1877
- Preceded by: William Little Lee
- Succeeded by: Charles Coffin Harris

3rd Hawaiian Minister of Finance
- In office September 6, 1853 – June 11, 1857
- Appointed by: Kamehameha III
- Preceded by: Gerrit P. Judd
- Succeeded by: Robert Crichton Wyllie

United States Council to Hawaii
- In office 1850–1853
- President: Millard Fillmore
- Preceded by: Joel Turrill
- Succeeded by: Benjamin Franklin Angel

Member of the U.S. House of Representatives from Maine's 8th district
- In office March 4, 1841 – March 3, 1843
- Preceded by: Thomas Davee
- Succeeded by: District eliminated

Personal details
- Born: January 28, 1804 New Salem, Massachusetts
- Died: January 1, 1883 (aged 78) The White House, Washington, D.C.
- Resting place: Mount Auburn Cemetery
- Spouses: Sarah Elizabeth Fessenden (m. 1828; died 1845) Mary Harrod Hobbs (after 1857)
- Children: 6, including William, Frederick
- Parent(s): Samuel Clesson Allen; Mary Hunt Allen
- Occupation: Politician

Elisha Hunt Allen (January 28, 1804 – January 1, 1883) was an American congressman, lawyer and diplomat, and judge and diplomat for the Kingdom of Hawaii.

== Early life ==
Elisha Hunt Allen was born January 28, 1804, in New Salem, Massachusetts. His father was Massachusetts minister, lawyer, and politician Samuel Clesson Allen (1772–1842) and mother was Mary (née Hunt) Allen (1774–1833).

He attended New Salem Academy and graduated from Williams College in 1823.

== Career ==
Allen was admitted to the bar in 1825 and commenced practice in Brattleboro, Vermont. In 1830 he moved to Bangor, Maine and entered into practice with John Appleton (born 1804), who would subsequently become Chief Justice of the Maine Supreme Court. Appleton would also marry Allen's sister Sarah in 1834. Allen was a member of Bangor's first City Council, from 1834, and from 1835 to 1840 was a member of the Maine House of Representatives, representing Bangor. He served as its Speaker in 1838. From 1841 until 1843, he served in the U.S. House of Representatives as a member of the Whig party, but his district (Maine's 8th congressional district) was eliminated before the next election based on census data. He ran in the 1842 election against Hannibal Hamlin but was defeated.

Following this loss, Allen ran for the Maine Legislature once more, serving one term before moving from Bangor to Boston in 1847 and being elected to the Massachusetts House of Representatives in 1849.

=== Kingdom of Hawaii ===
From 1850 to 1853, he was United States Consul in Honolulu, Hawaii under president Millard Fillmore. He realized the potential for the Hawaiian Islands to provide agricultural products to the growing number of people in the California Gold Rush and tried to negotiate a trade treaty but failed.

When he was replaced by an appointment from the Democratic Party president Franklin Pierce in August 1853, he decided to stay due to the severe shortage of legal professionals, and became a citizen of the Kingdom of Hawaii. Within weeks he was appointed Minister of Finance for King Kamehameha III replacing Gerrit P. Judd, and from 1854 to 1856 served in the House of Nobles. He openly advocated annexation of the islands by the United States, and opposed French and British influence. However, when King Kamehameha IV (who was considered pro-British) came to the throne in 1855, the annexation idea was put on hold. During Kamehameha IV and Queen Emma's wedding in 1856, he offered his own wedding band to the king to allow the ceremony to continue.

In June 1856, Allen sailed back to New England and remarried in Philadelphia. The newly married couple returned to Honolulu, where from June 1857 through February 1877, Allen was chief justice of the Kingdom of Hawaii Supreme Court. The Allens' first-born son, Frederick, was born ten days after Prince Albert Edward Kauikeaouli Kaleiopapa, and the two children became playmates. The prince died when he was only four years old.

=== Minister to the United States ===
From 1856 until his death in 1883, Allen served as Minister Plenipotentiary from the Kingdom of Hawaii to the United States. In August 1864, he served as Chancellor for the coronation of King Kamehameha V under the new 1864 Constitution of the Kingdom of Hawaii. In 1864, he tried again to negotiate a trade treaty. During the American Civil War sugar shipments from the American South were interrupted, increasing the demand from Hawaii.

In 1867, he bought a sugarcane plantation in an area called Princeville, Hawaii after the young Prince brought up with his son. He negotiated for the Reciprocity Treaty of 1875 which this time was signed by Ulysses S. Grant. The treaty removed tariffs but gave the U.S. the use of Pearl Harbor, which was not a popular concession with native Hawaiians. He left his son William Fessenden Allen from his first marriage in charge of the plantation, and went to Washington, D.C. to work out details of the trade agreement.

He returned briefly to Hawaii, but his two children from his second marriage were back in the United States, so he resigned his supreme court post and went back to Washington in February 1877. The plantation did not live up to his hopes. By 1879 it was losing money, in debt with a mortgage, and needed a new manager. He wondered if it was doomed to a fate similar to the prince for which it was named. Finally the plantation paid dividends starting in 1882.

== Personal life and death ==
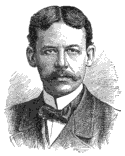
Frederick in 1899

In 1828, he married Sarah Elizabeth Fessenden, the daughter of William Fessenden and niece of author Thomas Green Fessenden. They had four children before her death in 1845, including:

- Ellen Fessenden Allen (1831–1881), who married George Tiffany. After his death, she married Henry Adams Patterson, and, thirdly, Charles Coffin Harris (1822–1881), her father's successor as Chief Justice and Chancellor.
- William Fessenden Allen (1831–1906), who married Cordelia Church Bishop (1837–1912), cousin of banker Charles Reed Bishop. William also served as Collector-General of the port of Honolulu.
- Elisha Hunt Allen Jr. (1836–1906), who served as Hawaiian consul in New York and who married Julia Anne Herrick (1839–1913).
- Sarah Fessenden Allen (1837–1901), who married Dr. William Palmer Wesselhoeft (1835–1909), one of the founders of the Massachusetts Homeopathic Hospital.

In June 1856, he sailed back to New England and married Mary Harrod Hobbs (b. 1808) (sometimes spelled Hobbes) in Philadelphia on March 11, 1857. Mary was daughter of another former Maine legislator Frederick Hobbs. Together, they were the parents of two children, including:

- Frederick Hobbes Allen (1858–1937), who served as his father's secretary, graduated from Harvard Law School in 1883, and become a law partner of his firm Adams & Allen in New York.
- Mary Allen

He died from a heart attack at the White House New Year's Reception for the Washington Diplomatic Corps given by president Chester Arthur at the White House on January 1, 1883, shortly before his 79th birthday. Allen is one of ten people known to have died inside the White House. He is interred in Mount Auburn Cemetery in Cambridge, Massachusetts.

== See also ==
- Relations between the Kingdom of Hawaii and the United States
- List of bilateral treaties signed by the Kingdom of Hawaii

U.S. House of Representatives
Preceded by Thomas Davee	Member of the U.S. House of Representatives from Maine's 8th congressional district March 4, 1841 – March 3, 1843	Succeeded by District eliminated
Diplomatic posts
Preceded by Joel Turrill	U.S. Consul to Kingdom of Hawaii; 1850–1853	Succeeded by Benjamin Franklin Angel
Preceded by William Little Lee	Kingdom of Hawaii Minister to U.S. 1856–1883	Succeeded by Henry A. P. Carter
Government offices
Preceded by Gerrit P. Judd	Kingdom of Hawaii Minister of Finance; 1853–1857	Succeeded by Prince Lot
Legal offices
Preceded by William Little Lee	Chief Justice of the Supreme Court of The Kingdom of Hawaiʻi; 1857–1877	Succeeded by Charles Coffin Harris
