= Stirling Fessenden =

American lawyer (1875-1944)

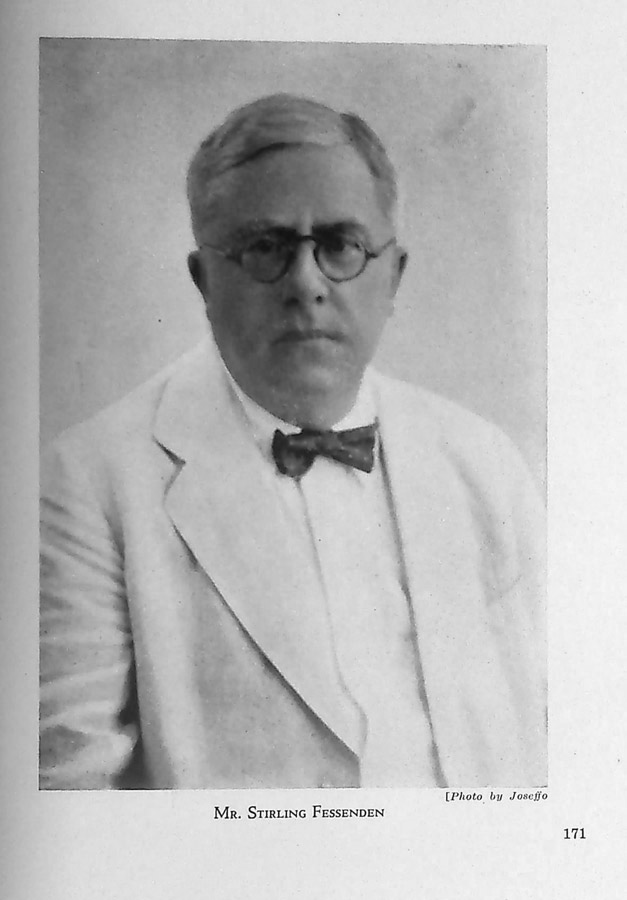

Chairman of the Shanghai Municipal Council
- In office 12 October 1923 – 5 March 1929
- Preceded by: H.G. Simms
- Succeeded by: Harry Edward Arnhold

Secretary General of the Shanghai Municipal Council
- In office 6 March 1929 – 30 June 1939
- Preceded by: New position
- Succeeded by: G. Godfrey Phillips

Personal details
- Born: September 29, 1875 Fort Fairfield, Maine, U.S.
- Died: February 1, 1944 (aged 68) Shanghai
- Profession: lawyer

Stirling Fessenden (29 September 1875 – 1 February 1944), an American lawyer practicing in Shanghai, served as the chairman of the Shanghai Municipal Council from 1923 to 1929 and as Secretary-General from 1929 to 1939.

== Early life ==
Fessenden was born September 29, 1875, in Fort Fairfield, Maine, United States. The son of Nicholas Fessenden, Judge and later Secretary of State of Maine, and Laura Sterling, he came from a prominent New England family which included Samuel Fessenden, a Massachusetts state senator and US Treasury Secretary William P. Fessenden.

In 1896, he graduated from Bowdoin College with a B.A. (Bowdoin College, in 1932, awarded him an honorary LLD.) He studied law in the New York Law School, evening department.

== Legal practice in Shanghai ==
Fessenden came to Shanghai in April 1903 to work as a sub-manager with the American Trading Company. In 1905, he commenced practicing law in partnership with Mr Thomas R. Jernigan. In 1907, he was admitted to practice in the newly established United States Court for China. He and Jernigan, were, initially, the only American lawyers to pass the strict bar exam introduced by the new judge, Lebbeus Wilfley. Later he formed a partnership with Major Chauncy Holcomb in the firm of Fessenden & Holcomb. He served as Chairman of the Far Eastern Bar Association in Shanghai for many years.

== Shanghai Municipal Council ==
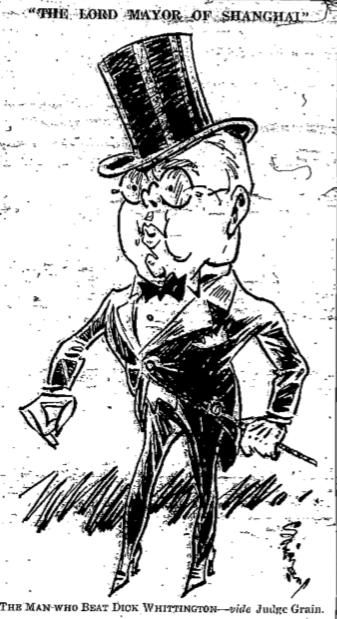
A caricature of Fessenden as the "Lord Mayor of Shanghai", 1927

In 1920, Fessenden was elected a member of Shanghai Municipal Council Board of Trustees and in October 1923 he became chairman of the Municipal Council.

Following the outspring on violence in Shanghai from 1925, he re-organized the Shanghai Volunteer Corps. He created the American Mercantile Company, mostly dealing with Shanghai real-estate in 1925 along with Harry Virden Bernard.

In 1929, Fessenden resigned from his post as Chairman of the Municipal Council and took up the post of Director-General (later Secretary-General) of Municipal Council, charged with the administration of the council.

After the Japanese invasion of China, the Shanghai International Settlement was encircled by Japanese troops. The Japanese authorities claimed that he conspired with the Americans against Japan.

With effect from June 30, 1939, Fessenden retired from his position with the council due to eye disease. He was succeeded by G. Godfrey Phillips, the secretary of the Council.

== Internment and death ==
In 1941, when Japan occupied the Shanghai International Settlement at the start of the Pacific War, the Japanese forced Fessenden to be interned with Russian refugees. After he was completely blind, Chinese servants took care of him.

Fessenden was offered a passage out of Shanghai in September 1943 on the Teia Maru to Goa (where passengers would transfer to the MS Gripsholm to take them back to the United States). However, knowing that he had little time to live, he declined. He died of a heart ailment, in Shanghai on February 1, 1944. Fessenden had indicated before his death that he wished to be cremated. There is no record of his burial in Shanghai, so he presumably was.
