= Samuel Fessenden (lawyer) =

American politician (1847–1908)

Member of: Connecticut House of Representatives; Connecticut Senate

Personal details
- Born: April 12, 1847 Maine, US
- Died: January 7, 1908 (aged 60)
- Party: Republican
- Education: Lewiston Falls Academy
- Alma mater: Harvard Law School (LLB)
- Occupation: Lawyer

Military service
- Branch/service: Union Army
- Rank: Second lieutenant
- Unit: First Maine Volunteer Battery
- Battles/wars: American Civil War

Samuel Fessenden (April 12, 1847 – January 7, 1908) was an American lawyer, politician, and Civil War veteran.

The son of Samuel and Abigail Fessenden, he was born and raised in Maine, where he attended Lewiston Falls Academy (now Edward Little High School). He served in the Union Army during the American Civil War in the Seventh Maine Volunteer Battery, eventually reaching the rank of second lieutenant in the First Maine Volunteer Battery. He later moved to Connecticut and served as a member of the Connecticut House of Representatives and Connecticut Senate. He served as President pro tempore of the Connecticut Senate. He was a state's attorney for Fairfield County. He was also a candidate for the U.S. Senate and a delegate to multiple Republican National Conventions.

He is best remembered outside of Connecticut for shouting from the floor of the 1896 Republican National Convention at Joseph Manley that "God Almighty hates a quitter" when it was becoming apparent that the candidate they were both supporting wasn't going to win the nomination.

== Personal life ==
He married Helen M. Davenport, daughter of Theodore and Harriet Chesebrough Davenport, in June 1873.
