= Education in Maine =

Education in Maine consists of public and private schools in Maine, including the University of Maine System, the Maine Community College System, private colleges, including Bowdoin, Bates, and Colby, and secondary and primary schools, and parent-led homeschooling.

== History ==
Maine was a part of Massachusetts from 1677 to 1820, and in 1647 Massachusetts required that public schools be provided. Kittery, the oldest settlement in Maine, opened its first school in 1692. However, schools were not widely available in sparsely-populated Maine until the mid to late 1700s. Homeschooling was the norm. The earliest schools were held in private homes and one-room schoolhouses. Berwick Academy, a secondary school, was founded in 1791, and Bowdoin College was founded in Brunswick in 1794. In 1820, when Maine separated from Massachusetts, the Maine State Legislature enacted a law requiring towns to raise money to educate residents ages 4 to 21.

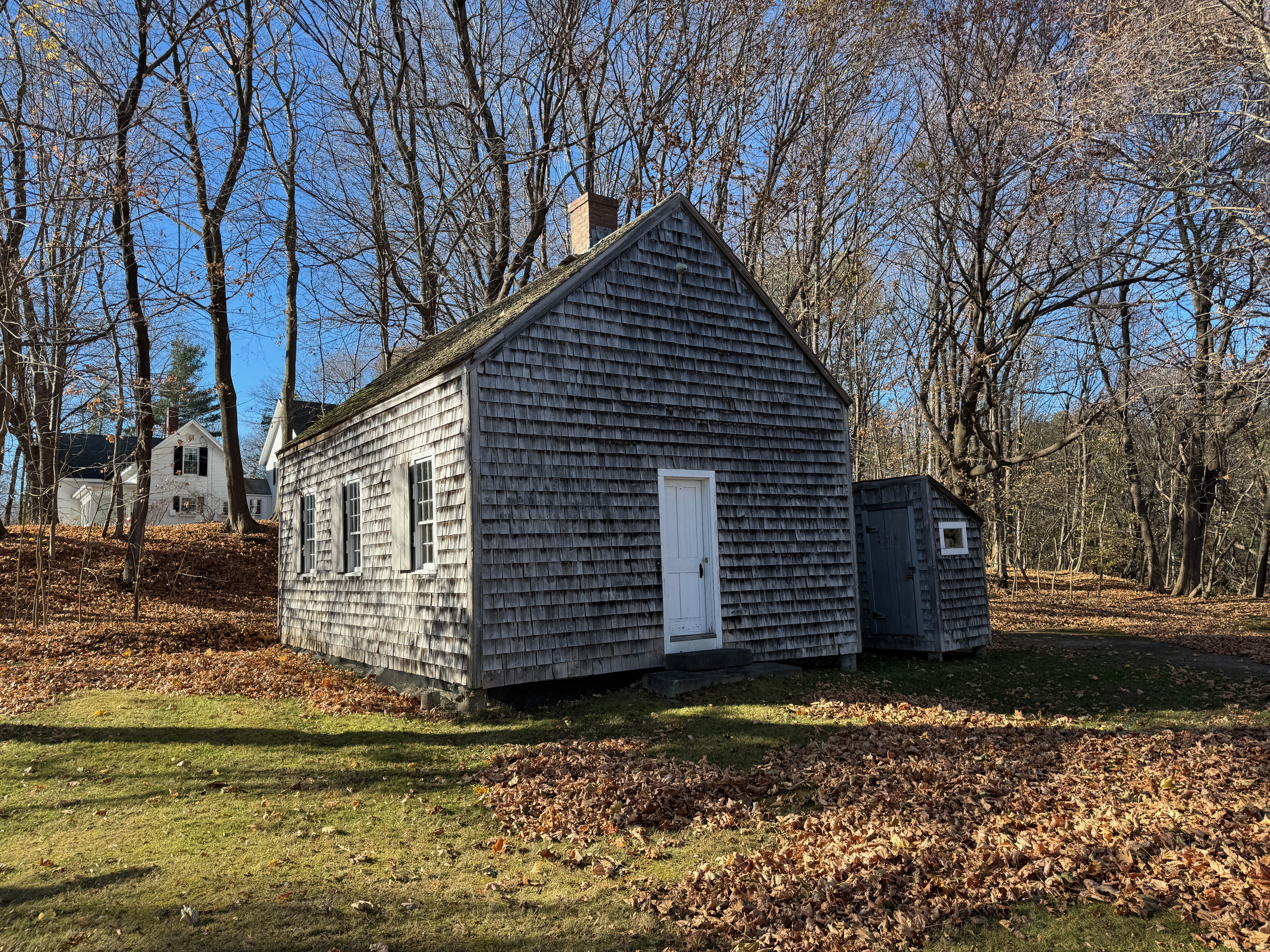
The Old Ledge School in Yarmouth was built in 1738.

=== One-room schoolhouses ===
One-room schoolhouses where all students are taught in one room were the earliest stand-alone school buildings in Maine. The Old Ledge School was built in 1738 in what was then North Yarmouth. The Old Schoolhouse in York, also known as the York Corner Schoolhouse, was built in 1755. The Alna School in Alna was built in 1795. The Growstown School in Brunswick was built in 1849. Crescent Lodge, also known as the Bowery Beach School, was built in Cape Elizabeth in 1855. Cliff Island located in Casco Bay and part of the Portland schools maintains an active one-room schoolhouse for elementary grades.

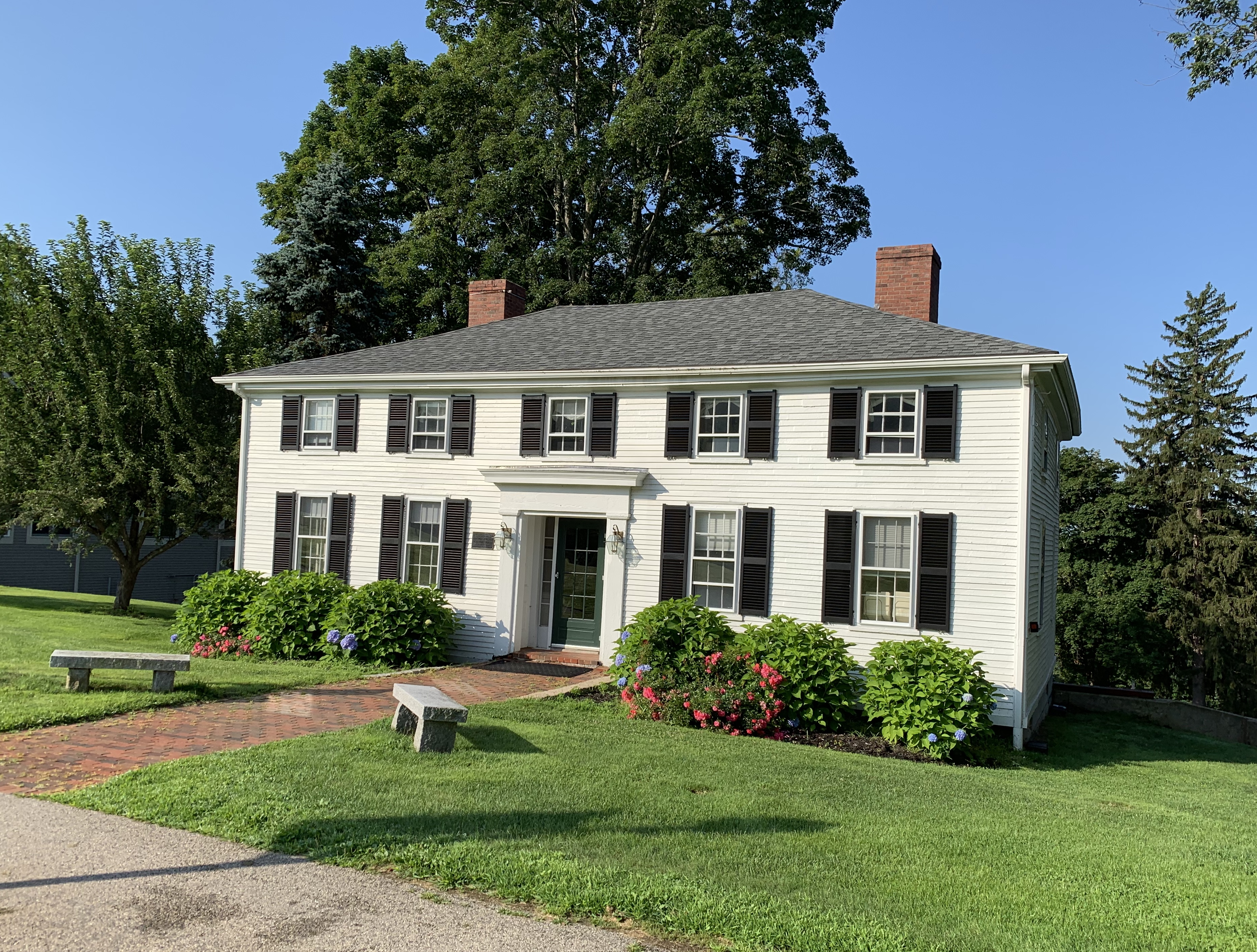
The original Berwick Academy building in South Berwick now called the 1791 Building.

=== 18th century secondary schools ===
The earliest secondary schools in Maine were built in the 18th century. All were established as private academies for fee-paying students. The oldest secondary school in Maine is Berwick Academy, which was established in 1791. Fryeburg Academy and Washington Academy were established in 1792. Portland Academy was established in 1794.

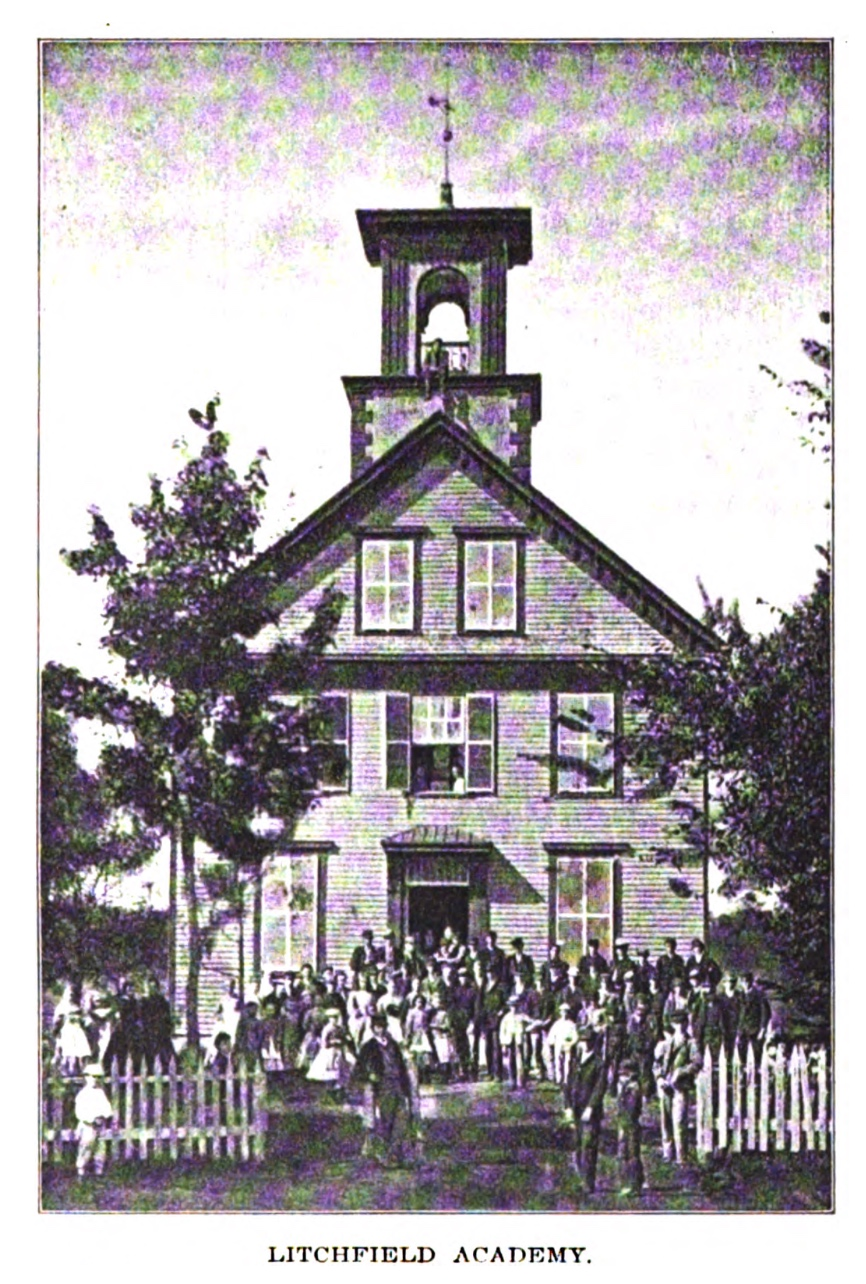
The Litchfield Academy was built in 1852 according to the plans for the original North Yarmouth Academy building constructed in 1811.

=== 19th century secondary schools ===
Many secondary schools, both private and public, were established in Maine in the 19th century. Lincoln Academy was established in 1801. George Stevens Academy, Monmouth Academy, Gorham Academy and Hampden Academy were established in 1803. Hebron Academy was established in 1804. The Red Brick School was established in 1807. Bridgton Academy was established in 1808. Thornton Academy was established in 1811. North Yarmouth Academy was established in 1814. Cony High School was established in 1815. Portland High School was established in 1821. Foxcroft Academy was established in 1823. Kents Hill School was established in 1824. Bangor High School was established in 1835. Gould Academy was founded in 1836. Lee Academy and Litchfield Academy were founded in 1845. Lewiston High School was established in 1850. Brunswick High School was established in 1851. Maine Central Institute was established in 1866. Deering High School was established in 1874. Waterville Senior High School was established in 1876. Erskine Academy was founded in 1883. Westbrook High School was established in 1886. Waynflete School was established in 1888.

=== 20th century school consolidation ===
In 1957, the Maine legislature passed the Sinclair Act requiring larger school districts and reduced administration. The act included increased operational funds for the consolidated school districts. When the act passed, there were almost 500 school districts in Maine. In 2007, there were 290 school districts and another effort was made to further consolidate schools. This effort didn't come with additional funding. Maine school districts shrunk to 164. However, many of the districts eventually disbanded. By 2025, there were 277 school districts in Maine, some consolidated and some serving individual towns.

=== 21st century voter budget approval ===
In 2005, the Maine legislature passed the Budget Validation Referendum Act. The act requires school districts to adopt a budget at a local school budget meeting. After it is adopted at a meeting, the school budget must be presented to voters at the polls for either approval or rejection. If the voters reject the budget, the local school district must adopt another budget and bring it to voters for a vote. This process continues until a budget is approved.

== Local governance ==
Maine public schools are governed by local school boards. Maine's constitution requires local control, also known as home rule, which allows municipalities to enact any laws that do not conflict with state or federal laws.

== Homeschooling ==
Since the days of Colonial settlement of Maine, homeschooling has been practiced in the state. Homeschooling of Maine children increased during and after the COVID-19 pandemic. In the 2019-2020 school year, 3.6% of Maine students were homeschooled. In the 2024-2025 school year, the number had increased to 6.4% of Maine students. The Maine Department of Education tracks students educated at home and requires parents to file a letter of intent to homeschool. Homeschooled students must take a standardized test or participate in an annual review by a certified Maine teacher or administrator.

== Department of Education ==
The Maine Department of Education (DOE) sets learning standards and oversees public education in the state. It is run by a commissioner appointed by the governor. Local municipalities and their respective school districts operate individual public elementary and secondary schools but the DOE audits performance of these schools. The DOE also makes recommendations to state leaders concerning education spending and policies.

== Primary and secondary schools ==
Education is compulsory from kindergarten through the twelfth grade, commonly but not exclusively divided into three tiers of primary and secondary education: elementary school, middle school or junior high school and high school.

=== Standards ===
Maine's state educational standards are the Maine Learning Results (MLRs), which apply to students in grades PreK-12. The state adopted the Common Core State Standards in 2011, replacing the New England NECAP test. The state incorporated these standards into the MLRs, and intended for schools to fully implement the Common Core standards by fall of 2013.

== Public school districts ==
Maine has several types of school administrative units: the first is a municipal school unit, one which serves only one municipality, and is headed by a superintendent. Usually, it serves kindergarten through grade 12, although some only go to grade 8. Usually, municipal school units which do not have a high school are not independent; they are part of a school union or CSD.

A school union is two or more school departments that share a superintendent but nothing else; each town has an independent school board. Usually, only one of the schools in the school union has a high school, but unlike MSADs (discussed below), students in the whole school union are not compelled to attend that school. School union students are given a choice of neighboring school districts, and the school union pays for the student's tuition.

The second type is a MSAD (Maine School Administrative District), sometimes simply abbreviated to SAD. This is a regional school district that incorporates two or more towns into one school district that pools their educational resources to educate all the students. These towns do not have independent school boards, but instead have one central committee governing the entire district. Students are obligated to attend the central high school. Usually, a SAD comprises one larger town and one or more smaller towns. The larger town is equipped with a high school and middle school, while the surrounding towns have elementary schools as well, but no secondary schools. Sometimes, towns in a SAD do not have an elementary school but possess a high school and/or middle school, whereas the surrounding towns have the elementary schools. Similar to SADs are RSUs (Regional School Units), which have slightly different governance, as determined by their voters. Some RSUs do business as SADs.

The third type of school district is a CSD (Community School District, sometimes called a Consolidated School District). This usually (but not always) exists in school districts with such a small student population between several towns that the school district cannot justify an elementary school outside the largest town in the district. In rare cases a CSD refers to only a high school of a school union. Sometimes, in towns geographically isolated (such as island towns) the entire student population attends one school grades PK–12.

Students can choose to attend a school in another district if the parents agree to pay the school tuition. Vocational centers are usually regional, so one school department will administer a technical center but other school districts will transport their students there to take classes.

Large portions of Maine are not part of any municipality. Students living in the unorganized territory of Maine are either assigned to the nearest school district, or Education in Unorganized Territory (EUT) schools operated directly by the Maine Department of Education.

== Private schools ==
Private schools are less common than public schools. A large number of private elementary schools with under 20 students exist, but most private high schools in Maine can be perceived as "semi-private." This means that while it costs money to send children there, towns will make a contract with a school to take children from a town or MSAD at a slightly reduced rate. Often this is done when it is deemed cheaper to subsidize private tuition than build a whole new school when a private one already exists.

In addition to the many private elementary schools, there are several well-known private high schools and K-12 schools including Fryeburg Academy, Waynflete School, Berwick Academy, and Cheverus High School.

== Magnet schools ==
Maine has one major magnet school: The Maine School of Science and Mathematics in Limestone. Another specialty public school exists in Portland: the Maine School of Performing Arts.

== Colleges and universities ==
The University of Maine System is the largest educational enterprise in the state, comprising seven universities across various campuses. It has an annual enrollment of nearly 30,000 students and significantly impacts the state's economy. The system is accredited by the New England Commission of Higher Education (NECHE) and offers a wide range of degree programs both onsite and online.

The Maine Community College System includes seven colleges with a total enrollment of approximately 17,500 students. The system has seen increased enrollment due to initiatives like the Free College Scholarship program, which allows recent high school graduates to pursue two-year degrees or certifications without tuition fees. This program has significantly boosted enrollment numbers beyond pre-pandemic levels.

== See also ==
- List of high schools in Maine
- List of colleges and universities in Maine
- List of the oldest public high schools in the United States
- List of the oldest private schools in the United States
