= Undergraduate degree =

Degree earned by a person who has completed undergraduate courses

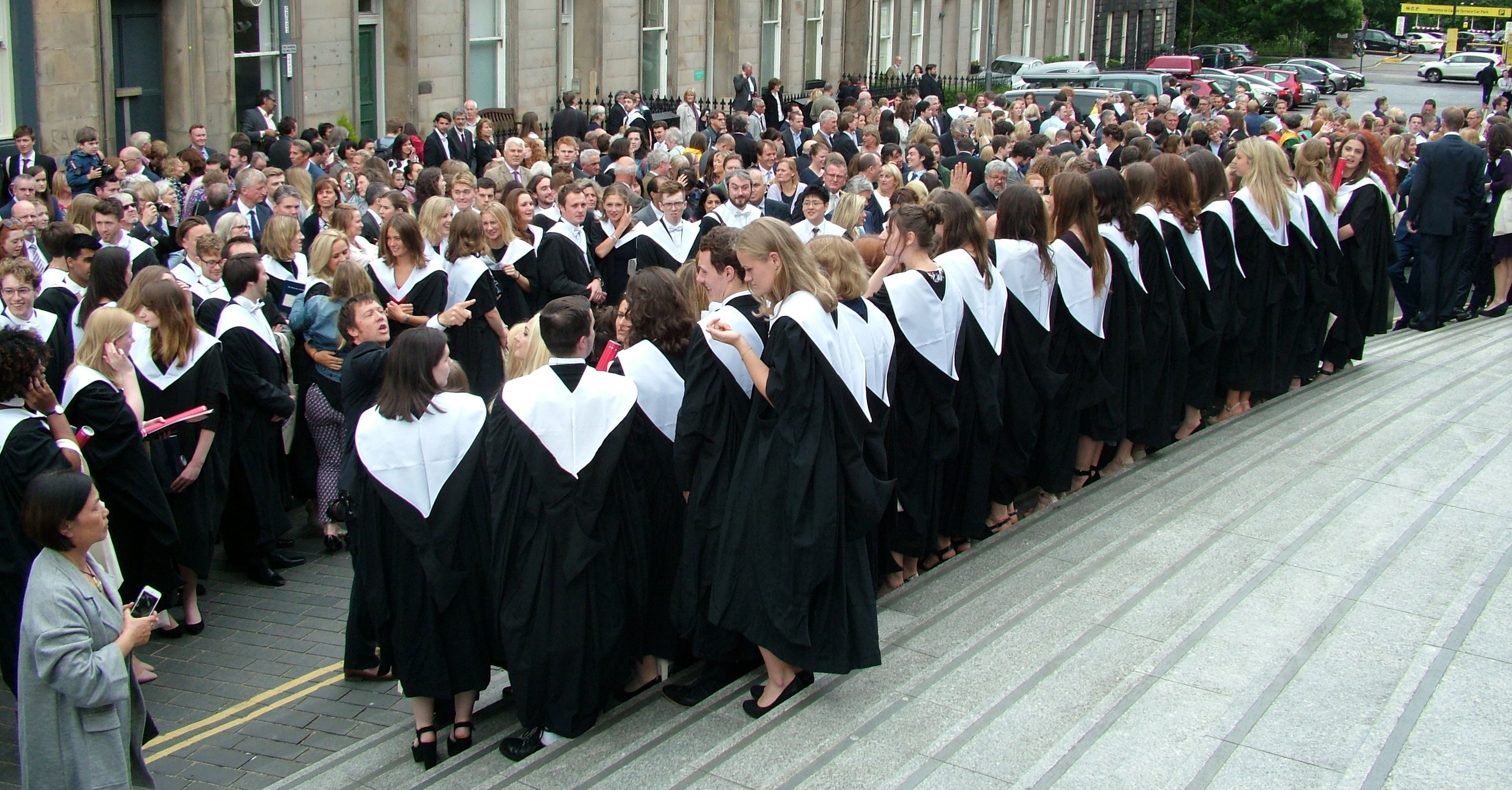
Undergraduate degree (Scottish Ancients MA) graduation at the University of Edinburgh

An undergraduate degree (also called a first degree or simply a degree) is an academic degree awarded to a student who has completed an undergraduate program of study. In the United States, undergraduate degrees are typically offered at institutions of higher education such as colleges and universities. The most common types are the associate degree and the bachelor's degree, with the latter usually requiring at least three to four years of full-time study to complete.

In other higher education systems, the scope of undergraduate education may extend up to the level of a master's degree. This structure is found, for example, in certain science courses in the United Kingdom and in some long-cycle medicine programs in continental Europe. Such qualifications are sometimes categorized as basic academic degrees or as first professional degrees.

== Europe ==
=== United Kingdom ===
In the United Kingdom, a bachelor's degree is the most common type of undergraduate degree. Some master's degrees, known as integrated master's degrees, can be undertaken immediately after finishing secondary education; these courses are usually extended versions of bachelor's degree programs, taking an additional year to complete. Most bachelor's degrees in England, Wales and Northern Ireland take three years to complete, with some notable exceptions, such as Medicine taking five years (these, like integrated master's degrees, are master's-level qualifications that include study at bachelor's level).

=== Italy ===
In Italy, the laurea (formerly laurea triennale, meaning "three-year laurea") is the most common type of "undergraduate degree". It is equivalent to a bachelor's degree and its normative time to completion is three years (note that in Italy scuola secondaria superiore or Lyceum [secondary or grammar school], takes five years, so it ends at 19 years of age). Not to be confused with the old laurea—now called laurea magistrale—which typically used to last five or six years. To earn a laurea, the student must complete a thesis, but a less demanding one than required for the old laurea (typically, a non-research thesis). There is not necessarily a laurea course for every discipline. For instance, for disciplines as Medicine or Jurisprudence only laurea magistrale courses are provided.

== North America ==
First professional degrees sometimes contain the word Doctor, but are still considered undergraduate degrees in most countries, including Canada. For example, the Doctor of Medicine (M.D.) program in Canada is considered an "undergraduate degree". However, in the United States, most first professional degrees are considered graduate programs by the U.S. Department of Education and require students to already possess an "undergraduate degree" before admission. These degrees are not research doctorates and are therefore not equivalent to the Doctor of Philosophy (Ph.D.) Many countries offer bachelor's degrees that are equivalent to American graduate degrees. For example, the Doctor of Medicine and Doctor of Osteopathic Medicine degrees offered in the U.S. are equivalent to the Bachelor of Medicine and Surgery (MBBS or MBChB) degree.

In the United States and sometimes in Canada, an associate degree is a two-year degree. It is occasionally undertaken as the beginning of a four-year degree. Some two-year college systems have articulation agreements with four-year institutions in their state, which specify which courses transfer without problems.

=== United States ===
==== Arizona ====
The Arizona General Education Curriculum certification (AGEC), awarded for the completion of an Associate of Arts, Associate of Science, or Associate of Business degree, indicates the completion of all bachelor's degree lower-level course work and permits the student to transfer to any of the three state universities and several private universities as a third-year student or "junior".

To obtain an AGEC certification, one must:

- Complete all associate degree credits at regionally accredited colleges (no secondary school credits accepted);
- Satisfy all their bachelor's degree Lower Division Credits and Courses;
- Meet credit transfer restriction guidelines;
- Maintain a minimum GPA of 2.0

Although an AGEC certification meets the requirements for the bachelor's degree Lower Level it may or may not meet any prerequisite requirements for any given degree program. Associate degrees with an AGEC certification are often custom tailored with electives to meet the prerequisite requirements for the program and university the student wishes to transfer to.

==== Virginia ====
Virginia's community college has signed system-wide agreements, allowing students who graduate from one of the 23 community colleges with a transfer associate degree and a minimum grade point average to obtain guaranteed admission to more than 20 of the Commonwealth's four-year colleges and universities.

== South America ==
=== Argentina ===
Argentine higher education system is based on the Spanish higher education system, which is basically a Continental education system (in contrast to the model in the English-speaking world). During the University Reform of 1918, a series of reforms that took place in the Universidad de Córdoba that further changed the Argentine educational system.

Currently there are three levels:

- Tertiary degree: 1 to 2 years degrees aimed at producing highly specialised and trained workforce.
- Graduate degree: 4 to 6 years programs taught at universities offering licentiate, engineering and medical degrees.
- Post-graduate: Specialised and research-oriented courses and programs. With masters or doctorate degrees being offer depending on the program.

=== Brazil ===
For a better understanding of education levels in Brazil, it is necessary to understand the structure of the higher education in the country. The present Brazilian system is organized according to the law that establishes the guidelines and bases for national education – Law n. 9.394 of 20 December 1996.

The classification of institutions of higher education happens according to their academic organization, and the following names are possible: Universities, University Centers, Colleges and Integrated Schools, Colleges and Institutes and Centers of Technological Education.

The higher education courses have two different academic levels, known as Undergraduate or Post Graduation. These degrees, have subdivisions in which are distributed programs of higher education in Brazil, and they may be bachelors, licentiates, and associates, for Undergraduate levels.

As for specializations, there are MBAs, Post-MBAs programs and for Post-graduation there are academic master's, professional master's degrees and doctorates. At the undergraduate level, there are still community colleges and further education courses.

==== Diplomas and certificates ====
At the undergraduate level, the bachelor's degrees, licentiates and technologist, provide undergraduation diplomas, while colleges and Extension courses provide certificates of completion. The law formalizes a B.A., B.S., Licentiate or Technologist degrees, according to the student's education, and is prerequisite to begin a Postgraduate degree course.

In the Postgrad, only students graduating from Stricto Sensu courses, that is, academic or professional master's and doctoral degrees and are given the titles of Master or Doctor, respectively. For students of the Lato Sensu – specializations, MBA programs and Post-MBA programs – is given certificates of completion and the title Specialist.

Graduate degrees in Brazil are called "postgraduate" degrees.

- Lato sensu graduate degrees: degrees that represent a specialization in a certain area, and take from 1 to 2 years to complete. Sometimes it can be used to describe a specialization level between a master's degree and an MBA. In that sense, the main difference is that the Lato Sensu courses tend to go deeper into the scientific aspects of the study field, while MBA programs tend to be more focused on the practical and professional aspects, being used more frequently to business, management and administration areas. However, since there are no norms to regulate this, both names are used indiscriminately most of the time.
- Stricto sensu graduate degrees: degrees for those who wish to pursue an academic career.
  - Masters: 2 years for completion. Usually serves as additional qualification for those seeking a differential on the job market (and maybe later a PhD), or for those who want to pursue a PhD. Most doctoral programs in Brazil require a master's degree (stricto sensu), meaning that a Lato Sensu Degree is usually insufficient to start a doctoral program.
  - Doctors / PhD: 3–4 years for completion. Usually used as a stepping stone for academic life.

=== Uruguay ===
Education in Uruguay is compulsory for a total of nine years, beginning at the primary level, and is free from the pre-primary through the university level. In 1996, the gross primary enrollment rate was 111.7 percent, and the net primary enrollment rate was 92.9 percent. Primary school attendance rates were unavailable for Uruguay as of 2001.

There are three levels of postsecondary education:

- Tertiary Education level: 1 to 4 years degrees related to technical professions like teachers, professorship (Instituto de Profesores Artigas (IPA)), Technicians and Technologists (CETP, ex-UTU).
- University level: 4 to 7 years Professional education taught at universities such as the University of the Republic (Uruguay) (Spanish: Universidad de la República) and various private universities offering many different degrees like Licentiate, Engineering degree, Medicine degree, various Law degrees, etc.
- Post-graduate level: This is a specialized and research-oriented education level. It is divided in three levels: Specialist degree for both tertiary and university graduates, meanwhile master's degrees (both professional and academic oriented) and doctorates are for graduated university students.

== See also ==
- British undergraduate degree classification
