= List of oldest schools =

This is a list of extant schools, excluding universities and higher education establishments, that have been in continuous operation since founded. The dates refer to the foundation or the earliest documented contemporaneous reference to the school. Claimed dates must be supported either by linking to a properly referenced article (any language WP) or else by reference here. Unlinked, unreferenced schools may be deleted.

== Sixth century ==
- The King's School, Canterbury, England (597)

== Seventh century ==
- King's School, Rochester, England (604)
- St Peter's School, York, England (627)
- Thetford Grammar School, England (631), first conclusive evidence (1114)
- Royal Grammar School Worcester, England (685), first conclusive evidence (1291)
- Beverley Grammar School (contested), oldest Grammar School in England (700)

== Eighth century ==
- Sherborne School, England (705)
- Willibald-Gymnasium, Eichstätt, Germany (c. 740), founded by Willibald
- Rabanus-Maurus-Schule (Domgymnasium), Fulda, Germany Fulda monastery school(748), founded by Sturmi
- Gymnasium Paulinum, Germany (797)
- Gymnasium Theodorianum, Germany (799)

== Ninth century ==
- Gymnasium Carolinum, Osnabrück, Germany (804), founded by Charles the Great (Charlemagne)
- Domgymnasium Hildesheim, Hildesheim, Germany (c. 815), founded by Louis the Pious
- Stiftsgymnasium Xanten, Xanten, Germany (exact founding date not clear)

== Tenth century ==
- Wells Cathedral School, England (c. 909)
- Warwick School, England (914)
- St Albans School, Hertfordshire, England (948)
- The Minster School, Southwell, England (c. 956)
- King's Ely, England (970)
- Benedictine High School of Pannonhalma, Hungary (996), founded by Grand Prince Géza of Hungary

== Eleventh century ==
- Roskilde Cathedral School, Denmark (c. 1020)
- Suzhou High School, China (1035)
- Menntaskólinn í Reykjavík, Iceland (1056)
- Viborg Katedralskole, Denmark (c. 1060)
- Katedralskolan, Lund, Sweden (1085), originally part of Denmark, despite the many Danish-Swedish wars continuously operating since it was founded.
- Salisbury Cathedral School, England (1091)
- Norwich School, England (1096)
- Abingdon School, England (1100, endowed 1256, refounded 1563)

== Twelfth century ==
- St Paul's Cathedral School, England (1123)
- High School of Glasgow, Scotland (pre-1124)
- Reading School, England (1125 as the school of Reading Abbey, refounded 1486, Royal charter 1541, closed in the 1860s, re-opened 1871)
- Royal High School, Edinburgh, Scotland (1128)
- Stirling High School, Scotland (1129)
- Stiftsgymnasium Melk, Austria (pre-1140)
- Bristol Cathedral School, England (1140)
- The Prebendal School, England (1116)
- Ribe Cathedral School, Denmark (1145)
- Trondheim Cathedral School, Norway (c. 1152)
- Bergen Cathedral School, Norway (1153)
- Oslo Cathedral School, Norway (1153)
- Lycée Institution Saint-Malo La Providence, France (1161)
- Westminster School, England (1179)
- Exeter Cathedral School, England (1179)
- Małachowianka, Poland (1180)
- Lanark Grammar School, Scotland (1183)
- Aarhus Cathedral School, Denmark (1195)
- Kirkwall Grammar School, Scotland (c. 1200)
- Paulo Pontine, later Bedford School, Bedford, England (Date Uncertain, refounded by Edward VI 1552, see below)

== Thirteenth century ==
- Colchester Royal Grammar School, England (pre-1206)
- Metropolitanskolen, Denmark (1209)
- Riga State Gymnasium No.1, Latvia (1211)
- Thomasschule zu Leipzig, Germany (1212)
- Ayr Academy, Scotland (1233)
- Lancaster Royal Grammar School, England (1235)
- High School of Dundee, Scotland (1239)
- Bailuzhou Middle School, Ji'an, China (1241)
- Harrow School, England (1243, Royal Charter in 1572)
- Katedralskolan, Uppsala, Sweden (exact year of foundation not known, by tradition 1246)
- Berthold-Gymnasium Freiburg, Germany (1250)
- Johan de Witt Gymnasium, Dordrecht, The Netherlands (1253) (oldest school in The Netherlands)
- Abingdon School, England (1256)
- Aberdeen Grammar School, Scotland (1257)
- Stedelijk Gymnasium van 's-Hertogenbosch, The Netherlands (exact year of foundation unknown, but first mentioned in 1274)
- Cathedral School in Turku, Finland (1276)
- King Edward VI Grammar School, Louth, England (1276)
- Ruthin School, Denbighshire, Wales (1284)
- King Edward VI Grammar School, Stratford-upon-Avon (1295 refounded 1553)
- Stedelijk Gymnasium Leiden, The Netherlands (first mentioned 1323, but year of foundation is estimated mid 13th Century)

== Fourteenth century ==
- Stamford School, England (c. 1309 but re-endowed 1532)
- Stedelijk Gymnasium Leiden, The Netherlands (First mentioned in 1323, but suspected to be founded in the second half of the thirteenth century)
- Northallerton School, England (1323)
- Hanley Castle High School, England (1326)
- Queen Elizabeth's Grammar School, Horncastle, England (1327)
- Gymnasium Haganum, The Netherlands (1327)
- Gymnasium Erasmianum, The Netherlands (1328)
- Gymnasium Ernestinum, Celle, Germany (1328)
- Gymnasium Laurentianum, Warendorf, Germany (1329)
- The King's School, Grantham, Lincolnshire, England (1329) refounded (1528)
- Bourne Grammar School Lincolnshire, England (1330)
- Hull Grammar School, England (1330)
- King's School Ottery St. Mary, England (1335)
- Barlaeus Gymnasium, Amsterdam, Netherlands (1342)
- Bablake School, England (1344)
- Instituto San Isidro, Spain (1346)
- St George's School, Windsor Castle, England (1348)
- Ripon Grammar School, Ripon, North Yorkshire. (1348) Date is earliest record but the foundation may be much earlier (7thC) but continuity is uncertain.
- Doncaster Grammar School / Hall Cross School, England (1350)
- Beauchamp College, England (1359)
- Sint Maartensschool (name later changed into Praedinius Gymnasium), The Netherlands (1375)
- Prince Henry's High School, England (c1376)
- Stedelijk Gymnasium Johan van Oldenbarnevelt, Amersfoort, The Netherlands (1376)
- New College School, England (1379)
- Wisbech Grammar School, Wisbech, England (1379)
- Knox Academy, Scotland (1379)
- Samuel von Brukenthal National College, Sibiu, Romania (1380) - originally part of Hungary
- Winchester College, Winchester, England (1382)
- Hereford Cathedral School, Hereford, England (1384)
- Katharine Lady Berkeley's School, Wotton-under-Edge, England (1384)
- Stedelijk Gymnasium Haarlem, the Netherlands (1389)
- Halepaghen Grammar School, Germany (1390)
- Penistone Grammar School, Penistone, England (1392)
- Cathedral School of Vilnius, Lithuania (founded before 1397)
- Ipswich School, Suffolk, England (1399) (first record of existence)
- Chorister School, Durham, England (c. 1400)

== Fifteenth century ==
- Latin School, Malmö, Sweden (1406)
- Oswestry School, England (1407)
- Durham School, England (1414) (possibly 635)
- Aberdeen Grammar School, Scotland (1418) (possibly 1257)
- Royal Latin School, England (1423)
- Brechin High School, Scotland (1429)
- Sponne School, England (1430)
- St. Patrick's Cathedral Choir School, Dublin, Ireland (1432)
- Sevenoaks School, England (1432)
- Eton College, England (1440)
- Chipping Campden School, England (c1440)
- King's College School, Cambridge, England (1441)
- City of London School, England (1442)
- Adams' Grammar School, England (1442)
- Bridlington School, England (1447)
- Dreikönigsgymnasium, Cologne, Germany (1450)
- Phanar Greek Orthodox College, Istanbul, Turkey (1454)
- St. Bartholomew's School, England (1466)
- Dunfermline High School, Scotland (1468)
- Bromsgrove School (record of a chantry school 1476, re-founded 1553)
- Magdalen College School, Oxford, England (1480)
- Galatasaray High School, Istanbul, Turkey (1481)
- Skegness Grammar School, England (1483)
- Stockport Grammar School, England (1487)
- Ermysted's Grammar School, England (1492) (first record of existence)
- King Edward VI School, Lichfield, England (1495)
- Loughborough Grammar School, England (1495)
- The Prebendal School, England (1497)
- Queen Elizabeth's School, Wimborne Minster, England (1497)
- Alcester Grammar School, England (1498)

== Sixteenth century ==
- King's School, Macclesfield, England (1502)
- Queen Elizabeth's Grammar School, Blackburn, England (1509)
- Royal Grammar School, Guildford, England (1509)
- St Paul's School, London, England (1509)
- Giggleswick School, England (1512)
- Lewes Old Grammar School, England (1512)
- Wolverhampton Grammar School, England (1512)
- Nottingham High School, England (1513)
- Pocklington Grammar School, England (1514)
- Manchester Grammar School, England (1515)
- Gillingham School, Dorset, England (1516)
- Bolton School, England (1516) (exact year of foundation unknown, but first mentioned in 1516)
- Cranbrook School, Kent, England (1518)
- King's School, Bruton, England (1519)
- Lessing-Gymnasium, Frankfurt am Main, Germany (1519)
- Dame Bradbury’s, Saffron Walden, England (1521), refounding school present at site since 1317
- Sedbergh School, England (1525)
- Royal Grammar School, Newcastle upon Tyne, England (1525)
- Boteler Grammar School, Warrington, England (1526)
- Bishop Vesey's Grammar School, England (1527)
- Hermann-Tast-Schule, Germany (1527)
- Bingley Grammar School, West Yorkshire, England (1529)
- Magnus Grammar School, England (1531)
- Bristol Grammar School, England (1532)
- Nicolas Gibson Free School now the Coopers' Company and Coborn School, England (1536)
- Elizabethan Grammar School now Wyggeston and Queen Elizabeth I College, England (1536)
- Gazi Husrev-beg medresa, Sarajevo, Bosnia and Herzegovina (1537)
- Kilkenny College. Ireland (1538)
- Jean Sturm Gymnasium, France (1538)
- The Crypt School, Gloucester, England (1539)
- Christ College, Brecon, Wales (1541)
- The King's School, Peterborough, England (1541)
- The King's School, Worcester, England (1541)
- The King's School, Gloucester, England (1541)
- The King's School, Chester, England (1541)
- Berkhamsted School, Hertfordshire, England (1541)
- Northampton School for Boys, Northampton, England (1541)
- King Henry VIII School, Abergavenny, Wales (1542)
- Dauntsey's School, Wiltshire, England (1542)
- Stadtgymnasium Dortmund, Dortmund, Germany (1543)
- Stedelijk gymnasium Nijmegen, Nijmegen, Netherlands (1544)
- The Prescot School, Knowsley, England (1544)
- Görres-Gymnasium, Düsseldorf, Germany (1545)
- Christ Church Cathedral School, Oxford, England (1546)
- St. Patrick's Cathedral Grammar School, Dublin, Ireland (1547)
- Colyton Grammar School, Colyford, Devon, England (1546)
- Archbishop Holgate’s School, York, England (1546
- Bradford Grammar School, Bradford, Yorkshire, England (1548)
- Kirkham Grammar School, England (1549)
- Maidstone Grammar School, Maidstone, England (1549)
- King Edward VI School, Bury St Edmunds, England (1550)
- King Edward VI Grammar School, Chelmsford, Essex, England (1551)
- Royal Grammar School, High Wycombe, England (1551)
- Leeds Grammar School, Leeds, England (1552)
- King Edward's School, Birmingham, England (1552)
- King Edward's School, Bath England (1552)
- Shrewsbury School, England (1552)
- Christ's Hospital, England (1552)
- Hutton Grammar School, England (1552; endowed 1522)
- Akademisches Gymnasium (Vienna), Austria (1553)
- Tonbridge School, England (1553)
- Bromsgrove School, England (1553)
- King Edward VI School, Southampton, England (1553)
- Queen Mary's Grammar School, England (1554)
- Boston Grammar School, England (1555)
- Gresham's School, England
- Ripon Grammar School, England (1555)
- Laxton Grammar School, England (1556)
- Hampton School, England (1556)
- Academic Grammar School, Prague, Czech Republic (1556)
- Brentwood School, England (1557)
- Friars School, Bangor, Wales (1557)
- Tadcaster Grammar School, England (1557)
- Vasaskolan, Gävle, Sweden (1557) (In 1669 absorbing Stockholms gymnasium, founded in 1640.)
- Enfield Grammar School, England (1558) (absorbing and replacing the Enfield chantry-school 1398–1558).
- Thomas Alleyne's High School, Uttoxeter, England (1558)
- Repton School, England (1559)
- Solihull School, England (1560)
- Leith Academy, Scotland (1560)
- Westminster Abbey Choir School, England (1560)
- Kingston Grammar School, England (1561)
- Colegio Nuestra Señora de Montesión, Spain (1561)
- St Olave's Grammar School, England (1561)
- Merchant Taylors' School, Northwood, England (1561)
- Queen Elizabeth's Academy, England (1561)
- Akademisches Gymnasium Innsbruck, Austria (1562)
- Elizabeth College, Guernsey (1563)
- Sir Roger Manwood's School, England (1563)
- Felsted School, England (1564)
- Herlufsholm Boarding School, Denmark (1565)
- Highgate School, England (1565)
- Queen Elizabeth’s Free Grammar School for Boys Rivington England (1566)
- Ashby School, England (1567)
- Rugby School, England (1567)
- The Royal School of Dunkeld, Scotland (1567) (Royal Charter granted in the name of King James VI of Scotland)
- Richmond School, England (1568)
- Bury Grammar School, England (1570)
- St Mary Redcliffe and Temple School, England (1571)
- Queen Elizabeth's School, Barnet, England (1573)
- Pate's Grammar School, England (1574)
- Dartford Grammar School, England (1576)
- Sutton Valence School, England (1576)
- IES Séneca, Spain (1577) (founded in 1569 as Colegio de la Asunción, a boarding school for the poor)
- Paisley Grammar School, Scotland (1577)
- Dronfield Henry Fanshawe School, England (1579)
- The Thomas Hardye School England (1579)
- Vilnius University, Lithuania (1579)
- Kirkcudbright Academy (earliest record of existence 1582)
- St. Bees School, England (1583)
- Pontificio Collegio Gallio, Como, Italy (1583)
- Oakham School, England (1584)
- Uppingham School, England (1584)
- Queen Elizabeth's Grammar School, Ashbourne, England (1585)
- Queen Elizabeth's Hospital, England (1586)
- Spalding Grammar School, England (1588)
- Joyce Frankland Academy, England (1588) (formerly Newport Free Grammar School)
- Queen Elizabeth Grammar School, Wakefield, England (1591)
- Queen Elizabeth School, Kirkby Lonsdale, England (1591)
- Stonyhurst College, England (1593)
- Emanuel School, England (1594)
- Ratsgymnasium Osnabrück, Germany (1595)
- Whitgift School, England (1596)
- Aldenham School, England (1597)
- Aylesbury Grammar School, England (1598)
- Queen Elizabeth High School, Hexham, England (1599)

== See also ==
- List of oldest institutions in continuous operation
- List of the oldest private schools in the United States
- List of the oldest public high schools in the United States
- List of the oldest schools in Sri Lanka
- List of the oldest schools in the United Kingdom
- List of oldest universities in continuous operation
