= Fatima Amiri =

Afghan student (born c. 2005)

Fatima Amiri (born c. 2005) is an Afghan student and advocate for women's education. She gained international recognition after surviving a deadly suicide bombing at the Kaaj educational center in Kabul on September 30, 2022. Despite being severely injured, she successfully took the national university entrance exam (known as the Kankor exam). After being prevented from attending university in Afghanistan due to the Taliban's ban on female higher education, she has faced further bureaucratic obstacles while seeking to continue her studies as a refugee in Turkey and Spain.

== Biography ==
=== Early life ===
Amiri was born in Ghazni province, which is located next to Kabul. Education held great importance in her family, and this prompted them to relocate from Ghazni to Kabul a few years after her birth in order to provide her with better educational opportunities.

She is the youngest of her five siblings, who include two sisters and three brothers.

=== Kaaj educational center attack ===
On September 30, 2022, a suicide bomber attacked the Kaaj educational center in the Dasht-e-Barchi neighborhood of Kabul, a predominantly Hazara area. Students were at the center for a practice university exam. The explosion killed 54 people and injured 114, most of whom were young women and girls from the Hazara ethnic group, a minority frequently targeted by the Islamic State – Khorasan Province.

Amiri, then 17, was in the classroom when the blast occurred. The explosion threw her several meters, and she suffered severe injuries, including the loss of her left eye, hearing loss in one ear, and a badly damaged jaw. Shrapnel was embedded in her face. Despite the trauma and her physical condition, she was determined to take the official Kankor exam.

=== Pursuit of education ===
Just over one month after the attack, Amiri sat for the exam and achieved a score of 313 out of a possible 360, placing her among the topstudents in the country. Her performance secured her admission to Kabul University to study computer science, her preferred subject. However, it coincided with the Taliban's increasing restrictions on women, which soon culminated in a complete ban on women attending universities in December 2022, preventing her from enrolling.

=== Turkey and Spain ===
==== Turkey ====
A crowdfunding campaign raised funds to support medical treatment for Amiri's injuries, which required services not available in Afghanistan. She traveled to Turkey with her father, where she received medical care. She passed a university entrance exam in Turkey and was briefly enrolled in a computer engineering program before having to leave. Sources reported this was due to her father's residency status being at risk.

==== Spain ====
In late 2023, Amiri and her father were granted international protection in Spain and took up residence in Salamanca. Her efforts to enroll in a Spanish university have been met with administrative obstacles related to her high school diploma. Her official diploma is dated 2021, though she completed her studies in 2022. This date discrepancy affects the process for direct university admission, and as of early 2025, the matter was being reviewed by the University of Seville.

== Recognition ==
In December 2022, Fatima Amiri was included on the BBC's annual 100 Women list. The BBC noted her perseverance in taking her final exams after being injured in the bombing.
