= Old Ledge School =

Historic schoolhouse in Yarmouth, Maine, U.S.

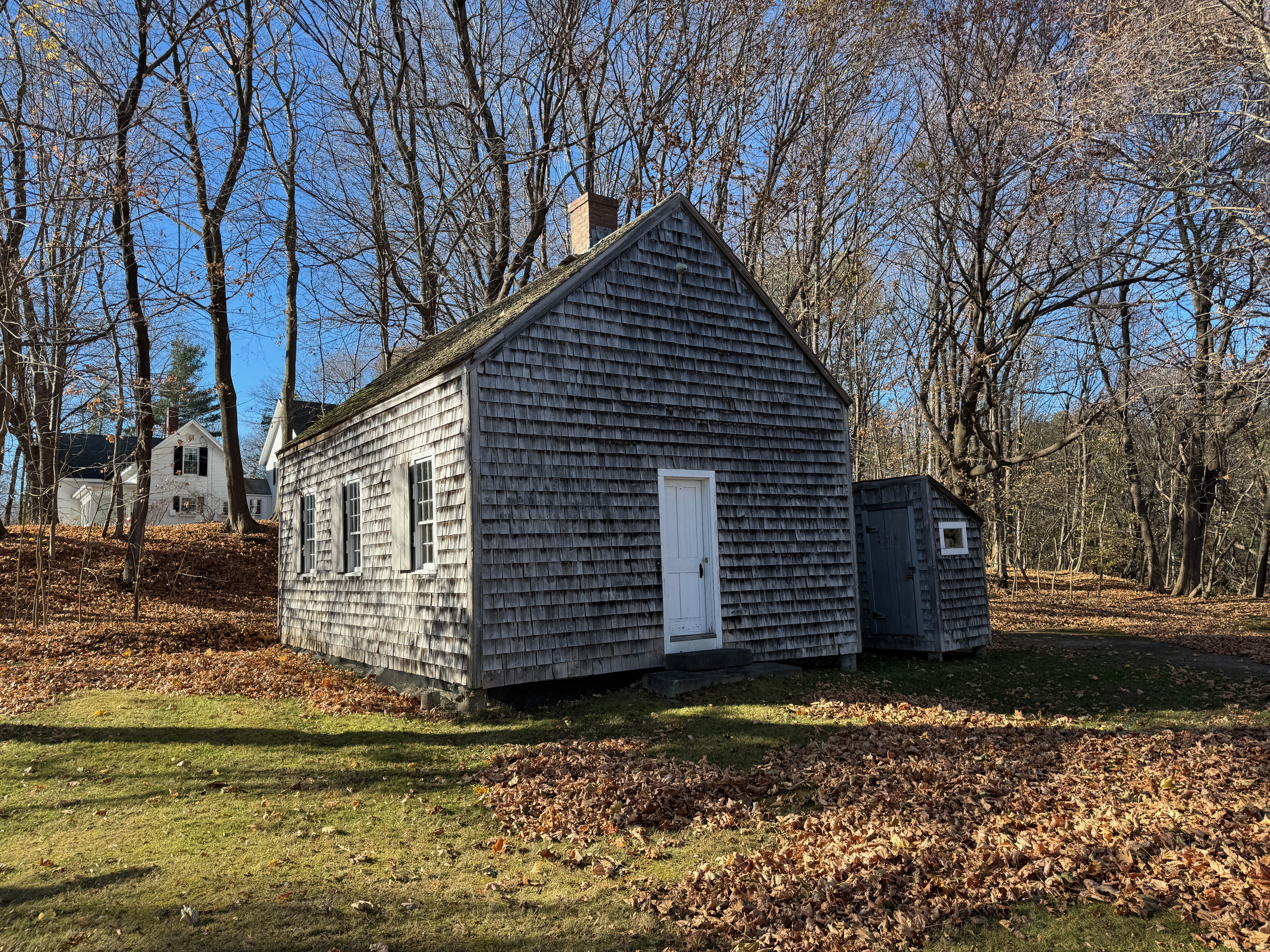
- The building in 2024
- Interactive map of the Old Ledge School area

General information
- Location: Yarmouth, Maine, U.S., West Main Street
- Coordinates: 43.805012°N 70.199436°W
- Completed: 1738 (288 years ago)
- Owner: Yarmouth Historical Society

Technical details
- Floor count: 1

The Old Ledge School is a one-room school located in Yarmouth, Maine, United States. Built in 1738, it was the first one-room schoolhouse in what was then North Yarmouth, Province of Massachusetts Bay. Originally located near the now-demolished Meetinghouse under the Ledge, it was moved in the mid-19th century a short distance from Gilman Road to the ledge, beside today's State Route 88. In 1972, it was reconstructed and moved once more, to its location today on West Main Street, beyond the brick schools.

== Gallery ==
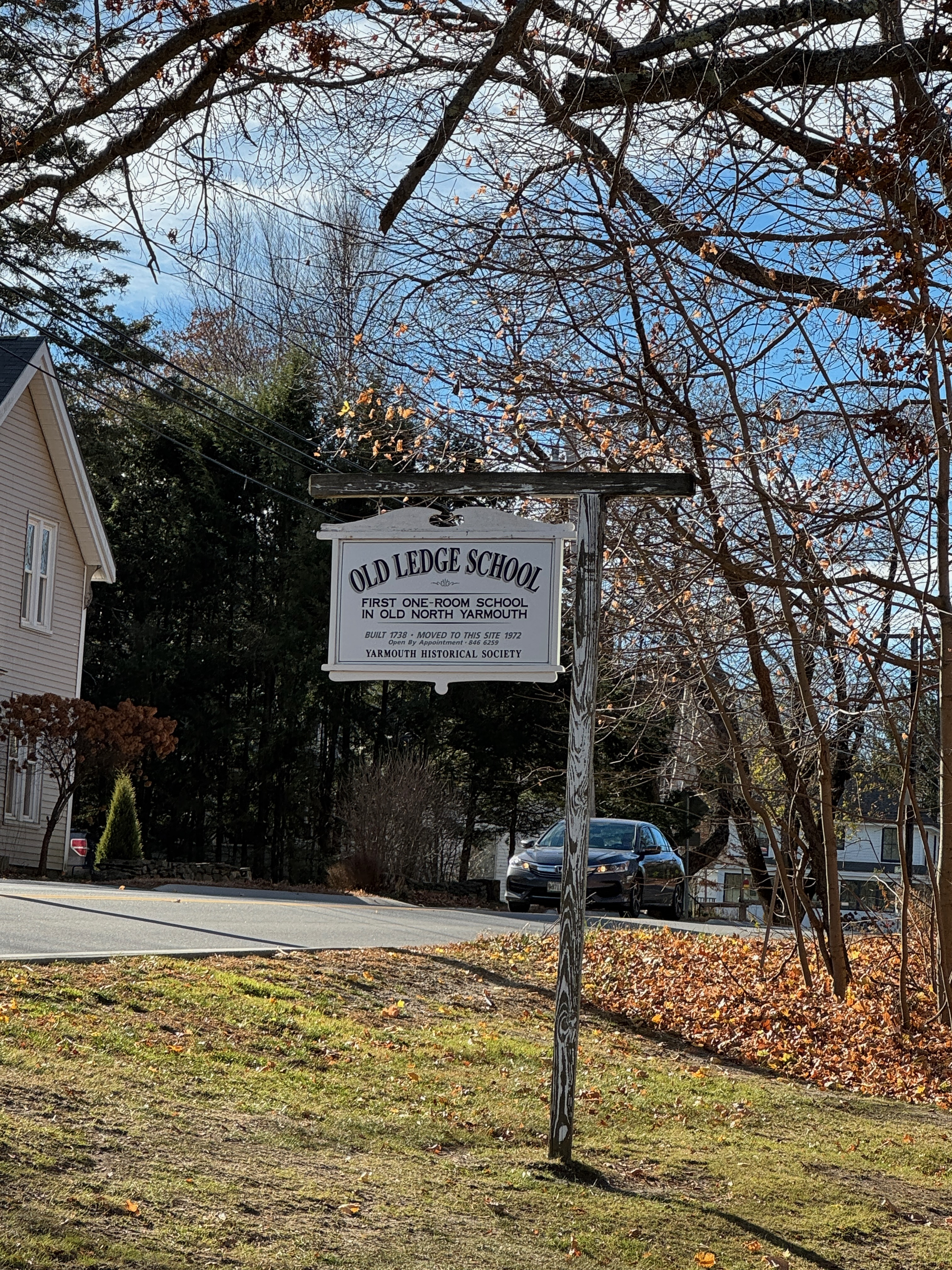
Sign erected by the Yarmouth Historical Society

== See also ==
- Education in Maine
