= Crescent Lodge =

- U.S. National Register of Historic Places
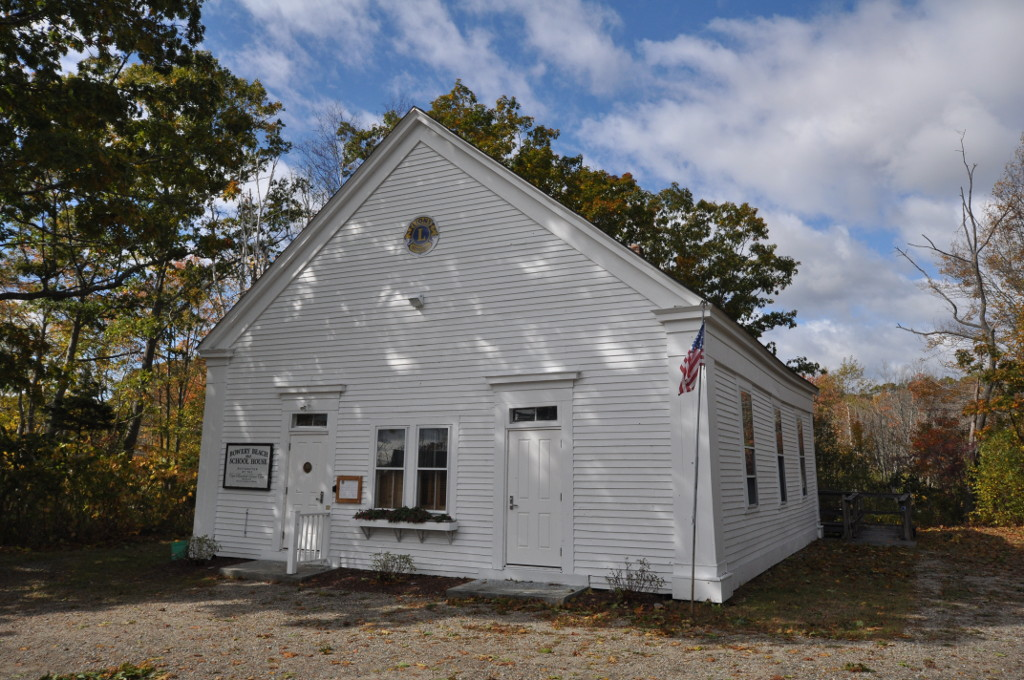

- Location within Maine
- Location: Cape Elizabeth, Maine
- Built: 1855
- NRHP reference No.: 100002591
- Added to NRHP: 2018

Crescent Lodge, also known as the Bowery Beach School, is a historic schoolhouse located in Cape Elizabeth, Maine, United States. Built in 1855, it served as a schoolhouse until 1930. Following its educational use, it was transferred to the Ladies Union, a local social club. In 1984, the building was passed to the Cape Elizabeth Lions Club. According to Greater Portland Landmarks, it is "one of the last remaining schoolhouses that characterizes the bygone era of one room schoolhouses..." It was added to the National Register of Historic Places in June 2018.

== See also ==
- Education in Maine
- National Register of Historic Places listings in Cumberland County, Maine
