= Fryeburg Academy =

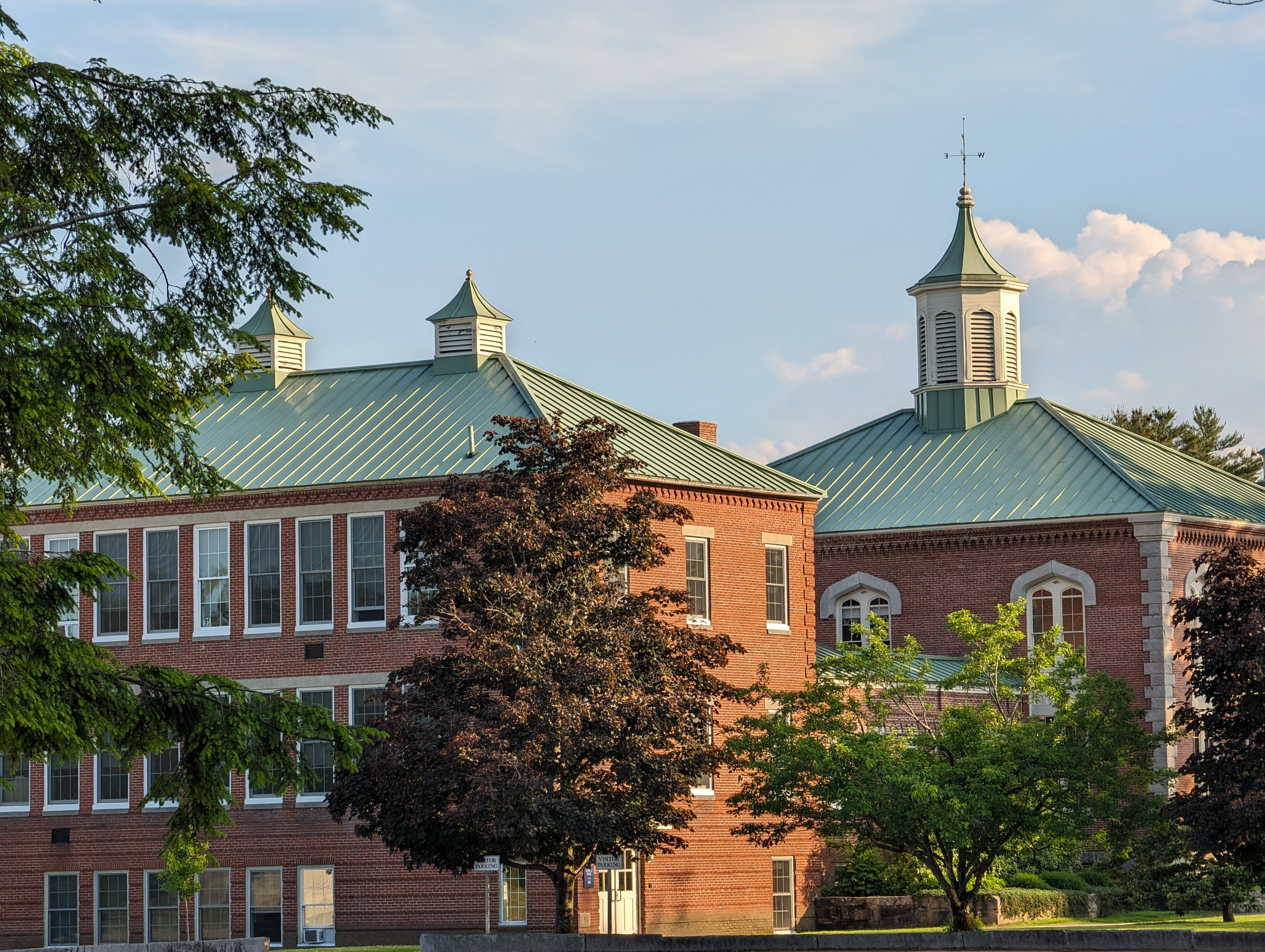
- Main building

Location
- 745 Main Street; Fryeburg, Maine 04037; United States
- Coordinates: 44°01′12″N 70°58′31″W

Information
- Type: Private, Boarding
- Established: 1792; 234 years ago
- Head of School: Joseph R. Manning
- Faculty: 53
- Enrollment: 650 total; 185 boarding; 465 day
- Average class size: 15 students
- Student to teacher ratio: 11:1
- Campus: Rural, 238 acres (1 km^{2})
- Colors: Blue and White
- Athletics: 40 teams
- Mascot: Raider
- Website: www.fryeburgacademy.org

Fryeburg Academy is a private secondary school located in Fryeburg, Maine. The academy was founded in 1792, making it the oldest high school in Maine and one of the oldest private schools in the United States. Daniel Webster was one of the first administrators, teaching at the school for a year.

Boarding students come from across the United States, North America, Europe, Asia, and Africa. The Academy also serves as the high school for the MSAD 72 school district. Around 75% of the school's student population comes from the local school district.

The National Center for Education Statistics (NCES) categorizes the school as private.

== History ==
Fryeburg Academy was founded in 1792, replacing an earlier public schoolhouse. From its inception, the academy was closely linked to Bowdoin College.

Daniel Webster served as the school's preceptor in 1802. Webster served just one year; his successor, Rev. Amos Cook, would serve over three decades. Cook grew the academy's stature considerably, and attempted to obtain books and other materials from former President Thomas Jefferson, with the help of another former president, John Adams, in 1815. Jefferson supplied a handwritten letter from George Washington, which Cook kept as a private keepsake; it was sold at auction in 2006 for $273,600.

During Cook's tenure, Fryeburg Academy moved to its current campus. The celebrated painter Rufus Porter, who would go on to found Scientific American, enrolled at Fryeburg Academy in 1804. Cook may have helped Porter obtain support for his first published work, Martial Musician's Companion, in 1814.

Fryeburg Academy has always been a co-ed institution, although men and women received different instruction in the school's early years.

By the mid-19th century, Maine had at least two dozen private academies, plus Fryeburg Academy. These institutions served local communities and offered room and board. The state began standardizing its education system, requiring compulsory, public education, in 1873, and the number of public-serving private academies in Maine has since fallen to less than half of its 19th century peak.

Elroy O. LaCasce served as principal of Fryeburg Academy for thirty-three years. The LaCasce Dining Room on campus is named for him. His youngest son, John Steward LaCasce, founded Burlington College in 1972, and served as its president until 1994.

In the early morning hours of October 12, 2005, a fire destroyed the Gibson Gymnasium at Fryeburg Academy. The fire was determined to be arson, and two former students were charged. Financier Bion R. Cram, an alumnus, bequeathed $15 million to help rebuild the school's facilities and establish scholarships for students.

== Notable alumni and faculty ==
- Anna Barrows, early 20th century cooking lecturer
- Nathaniel S. Benton, New York politician
- John W. Dana, former Maine Governor
- Marty Engstrom, broadcast engineer, weather presenter and television personality
- James Farrington, US Congressman
- Harvey Dow Gibson, financier
- Spalding Gray, actor and monologist
- Joseph M. Harper, US Congressman and Acting Governor of New Hampshire
- Rufus Porter, painter and founder of Scientific American
- Marc Murphy, celebrity chef
- James W. Ripley, US Congressman
- David S. Rohde, New York Times investigative reporter
- Casey Sherman, NY Times bestselling author of The Finest Hours, Bad Blood and Search for the Strangler
- Daniel Webster, lawyer and statesman (former headmaster)
- David Woodsome, member of the Maine Senate from 2012- to present and former faculty.

== Images ==
The Mack Bauscher bell tower atop the oldest part of the school.

The Bion R. Cram Library at night.

== See also ==
- Education in Maine
