= Growstown School =

Historic schoolhouse in Brunswick, Maine, U.S.

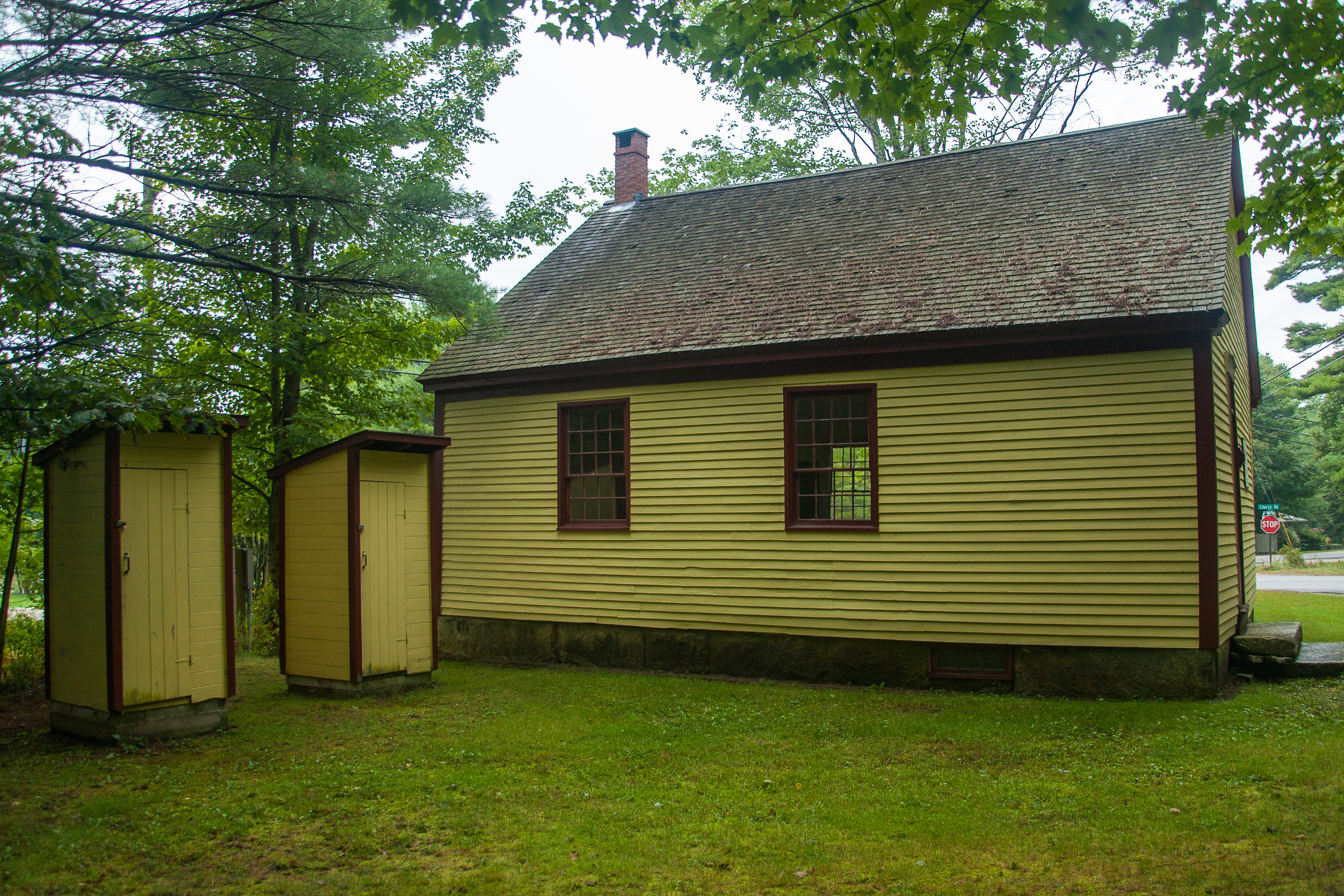
- The southern side of the building, pictured in 2013, with the entrance on the right
- Interactive map of the Growstown School area

General information
- Location: Brunswick, Maine, U.S.
- Coordinates: 43.899473045°N 70.00011123°W
- Completed: 1849 (177 years ago)
- Opened: February 22, 1849

Technical details
- Floor count: 1

The Growstown School is a historic one-room school built in 1849 and located in the Growstown neighborhood of Brunswick, Maine, United States.

== History ==
Built in 1849, and opened on February 22 of that year, it was saved from demolition in 1971 after local residents intervened, an act that included the installation of a new roof on the property. It was restored over time, including by the American Association of University Women (AAUW) in 1983 (which turned it into a living history center) and later by the town's public works department. It is now the only remaining one-room schoolhouse in Brunswick of a one-time twenty-six. Betty Fitzjarrald, who chaired the restoration effort for the AAUW, died in 2022, aged 87.

Children were still attending the school in the mid-20th century.

The school was part of a case study published in 1984 by Andrew Gulliford.

In 2015, it was discovered that the school's foundation was failing, a repair for which was estimated to be between $40,000 and $70,000. Seven years earlier, its floor joists and support beams were found to be deteriorated to the point that they were no longer being effective. The school was declared unsafe in March 2014.

The following year, Brunswick Rotary Club installed a bronze plaque on the building, which stands at the intersection of Church Road and Woodside Road.

Fifth-grade schoolchildren from around Maine attend the school in the fall and spring to experience school life as it would have been in the 1850s. They are not allowed to bring modern conveniences, such as cell phones or lunch boxes, into the school. In addition, their school buses drop them off a few blocks away so that they have to walk to the school, as the children of the period did.

== See also ==
- Education in Maine
