= Dutch universities =

National university system of the Netherlands

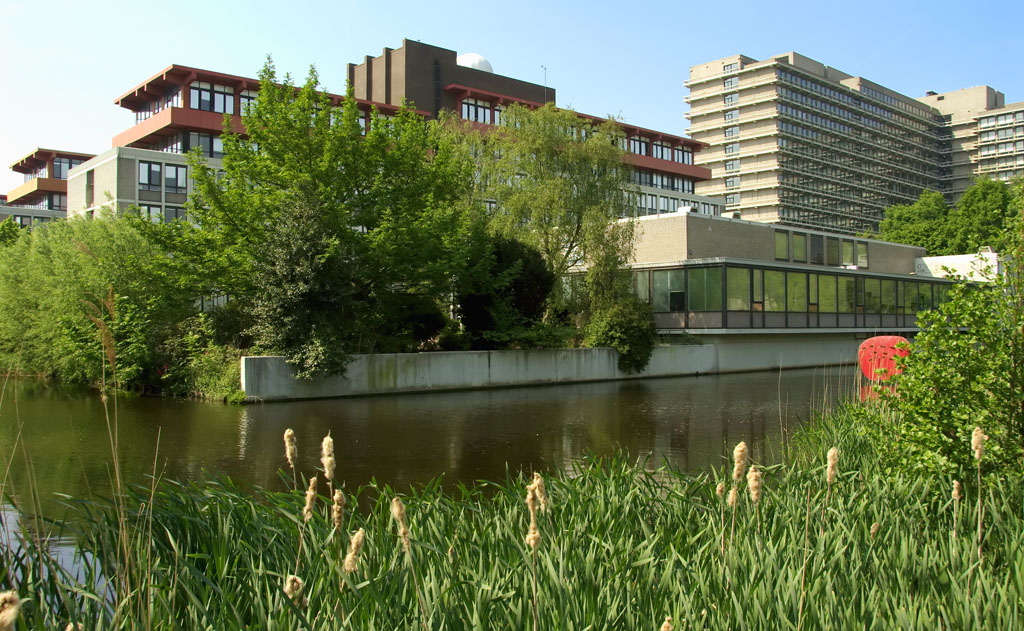
Vrije Universiteit (Amsterdam). Left: Exact Sciences; Right: Humanities and law.

Dutch universities are supported by public funding (with the exception of Nyenrode Business University) so that universities do not have to rely on private funding to pay for tuition. This public funding is entirely output-based, determined by the number of undergraduate and graduate degrees delivered. Except for this output-based funding, Dutch universities are almost entirely private entities (i.e. foundations) that, since 1998, own and operate their real estate at their own risk; moreover, the employees of Dutch universities have labor contracts based on private sector terms (as of 2020).

All citizens of the Netherlands who complete high school at the pre-academic level (vwo) or have a professional propedeuse at HBO level, signifying they have finished their first year course, are eligible to attend university. In the case of an HBO-propedeuse some restrictions may apply as to deficiencies in High School subjects. Three universities (Leiden, Utrecht and Groningen) have restrictive requirements based on academic ability, and all universities have restrictive requirements for some of their programs because the number of prospective students sometimes outnumbers the number of available places.

Many Dutch students attend universities relatively far from their parental homes (in contrast to universities in Italy and Spain for example), although scarcity of accommodation sometimes forces students to commute. As a compensation for this, Dutch students normally receive a card (OV-chipkaart) that allows them to use public transport for free during part of the week (either workdays or the weekend) and with a discount during the other part. Waiting lists for student accommodation in the Netherlands can be more than a year, particularly in Utrecht and Amsterdam, so many students rent a room in the private sector.

Quality differences between Dutch universities are generally small, and the best university in one subject can be the worst in another. This is one of the reasons why none of them tend to end in the top tier of international university ranking systems. All of them, however, score well above average. Instruction at the undergraduate level tends to be in Dutch, but it is in English for most Masters and PhD programs.

Dutch universities used to offer only four- or five-year courses. Since 2002 most of them now offer three-year undergraduate programmes, leading to a bachelor's degree, and one- or two-year Master's programmes. Old habits remain, partly because stopping after a BSc is seen as "dropping out", and a large majority of university students enroll on master's courses. To confuse matters, students attending Universities of Applied Sciences (HBO) also obtain a bachelor's degree, but the programmes in these institutes usually take four years instead of three. It is possible to continue after a HBO (Hoger beroepsonderwijs, "higher occupational education") bachelor's degree to a university master's, with often a pre-master deficiency program or other additional requirements on minimum GPA.

== See also ==
- List of universities in the Netherlands
- Education in the Netherlands
- Academic degrees
- University
  - British universities
  - French universities
  - Italian universities
  - Spanish universities
  - US universities
