= Old Schoolhouse (York, Maine) =

- U.S. National Register of Historic Places
- U.S. Historic district – Contributing property
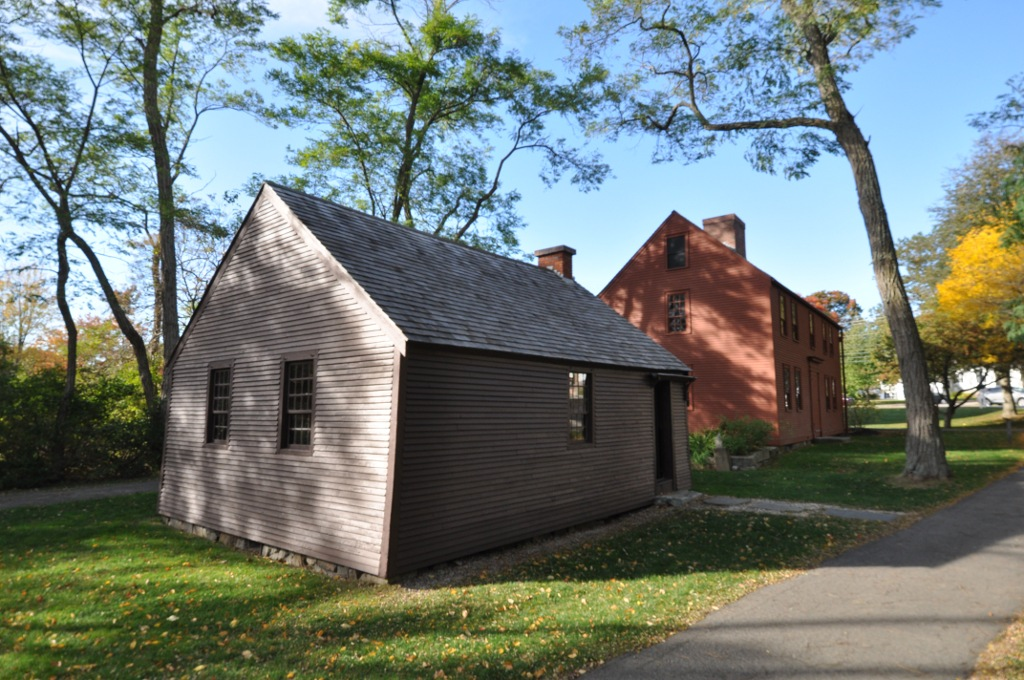

- Location within Maine Location within the United States
- Location: York Street (on the Village Green), York, Maine
- Coordinates: 43°8′38″N 70°39′13″W
- Area: less than one acre
- Built: 1755
- Part of: York Historic District (ID73000249)
- NRHP reference No.: 73000247

Significant dates
- Added to NRHP: April 2, 1973
- Designated CP: July 16, 1973

The Old Schoolhouse, also known as the York Corner Schoolhouse, is an historic one-room school building on the grounds of the Old York Historical Society at York and Lindsay Streets in York, Maine. Built in 1755, it is one of the oldest surviving schoolhouses in all of New England. It was listed on the National Register of Historic Places in 1973.

== Description and history ==
The Old Schoolhouse is located on the west side of Lindsay Street a short way south of its junction with York Street (United States Route 1A), just outside the center of the village of York. It stands adjacent to the Jefferds Tavern and the visitor center of the Old York Historical Society, which stands at the street corner. The schoolhouse is a small wood frame structure with a gable roof covered in wooden shingles, with exterior walls clad in clapboards. The interior is quite plain, with wide hand-planed floorboards, a fireplace at one end, a small section of plastered wall, and a few small windows.

This schoolhouse was built in 1755 in the York Corner area to provide schooling for that area's children. The building's window openings were originally covered in oiled paper, which would have provided a limited amount of daylight. (The interior is currently lit by electric lights added by the museum.) It was rescued from demolition by the museum, its previous use having been as a chicken coop.

== See also ==
- Education in Maine
- National Register of Historic Places listings in York County, Maine
