= Marty Engstrom =

Weather presenter & television personality (1937–2024)

Martin D. Engstrom
- Marty Engstrom's trademark smile atop Mount Washington (WMTW-TV)
- Born: April 28, 1937; Hanson, Massachusetts
- Died: January 4, 2024 (aged 86); Fryeburg, Maine
- Occupation(s): Weather presenter, television personality
- Years active: 38

Marty Engstrom (April 28, 1937 – January 4, 2024), best known by his television title Marty on the Mountain, was an American broadcast engineer, weather presenter and television personality. He broadcast the weather for WMTW Channel 8 News for 38 years from atop Mount Washington in New Hampshire.

== Early life ==
Martin D. Engstrom was born on April 28, 1937, in Hanson, Massachusetts to Martin Sr and Ruby (née Smith) Engstrom and grew up in Fryeburg, Maine. His parents worked at a local canning plant. He attended Fryeburg Academy and graduated in 1956. Engstrom joined the Air Force as a weapons control technician. After his service, he received a commercial radio license and took a job operating WMTW's transmitter on the summit of Mount Washington; approximately 6,288 feet high, with a record low temperature of −47 °F and a recorded wind speed of 231 miles per hour.

== Career ==
On his first day of work in 1964, Engstrom was told in addition to his regular duties of manning the transmitting equipment, he would also be required to give a daily "on-air" weather report each night on the evening news. "First day on duty, I was told, 'Get a script written, you're going to be on camera,'" Engstrom recalls. "Huh, who me? What?" After a few reports, Engstrom was told to "add a little personality" (smile at the end of each report). So at the end of his next report, he forced an awkward smile that would become his trademark sign-off; along with his signature clip-on Western bow tie and extremely thick Maine accent (which many thought was fake). "I remember people asking me if he really talked like that," said Tim Moore, president and CEO of the Maine Association of Broadcasters, "They couldn’t believe his accent wasn’t put on.” As reporter for the Concord Monitor, David Brooks, recalls, "... all the guys in my college dorm, who couldn’t have cared less about the news but would gather around the TV set in the lounge when Marty appeared on Channel 8, giving a cheer when that grin appeared."

Engstrom would write out his 30-second report on a small cue card and tape it to the camera. Engstrom wrote his own scripts and spent time thinking up material for each broadcast. "The weather itself would only take up maybe ten seconds,” he said, “So, I’d try to think up some sassy remark." Sometimes a technical glitch would add to the forecast; or a visit from the station's cat, Pushka, who Engstrom would famously tell: "Down, Kit-tee!" in his thick Down East accent. For many New England families, it was a nightly ritual to watch Engstrom each evening. Alton, New Hampshire resident, Gail Stevens Allard, recalls how her father would make her family be quiet during Engstrom's reports: "As soon as he gave his grin, we knew we were released from the rule of silence and we’d start to giggle."

== Retirement and legacy ==
At the turn of the 21st century, the decision was made to relocate the WMTW-TV transmitter from atop Mount Washington; which meant that Engstrom and other engineers were no longer needed. Engstrom retired in 2002; the same year the project was completed. His final broadcast was on February 5, 2002. Asked what his favorite memory was about working on top of one of the coldest places in North America, Engstrom replied: "Well I think the best thing about this job always has been the view from the kitchen window, 130 miles on a clear day." In 2003, he wrote a book about his years reporting the weather atop Mount Washington entitled, Marty on the Mountain: 38 Years on Mount Washington.

Engstrom's daughter, Anita, said that her father held a deep reverence for his time working atop Mount Washington, but he never understood his fame and popularity. "He was very humble. People would come up to him excited and say 'Oh, you’re Marty Engstrom,' and he’d just say 'Yup,'" she once said in an interview, "We’d tell him, 'Dad, you’re famous, people know who you are.'" WMTW anchorman, Steve Minich, recalls attending a banquet for Channel 8. While each news anchor was introduced, they received modest applause; but when Engstrom was called: "the place went wild, everybody [cheered]." “He’s the one people loved," Minich said, "What you saw was what you got with him, and I think people knew that." Although he delivered the weather for WMTW Channel 8 news for 38 years, Engstrom jokingly replied: "I am not now and never have been intentionally in the weather business. I'm a TV engineer, not a meteorologist!" Engstrom would stay atop the Washington summit for 7 days straight and then spend 7 days at his home in Fryeburg.

Engstrom was inducted into the Maine Association of Broadcasters Hall of Fame in 2019. He was a member of The National Association for Amateur Radio. He died on January 4, 2024, at his home in Fryeburg, Maine.

== Bibliography ==
- Engstrom, Marty (January 1, 2003). Marty on the Mountain: 38 Years on Mount Washington. Martin Engstrom. ISBN 978-0974096704.
- Pinder, Eric (April 14, 2008). Among the Clouds: Work, Wit & Wild Weather at the Mount Washington Observatory. Alpine Books. ISBN 978-0615204598.
