= List of the oldest public high schools in the United States =

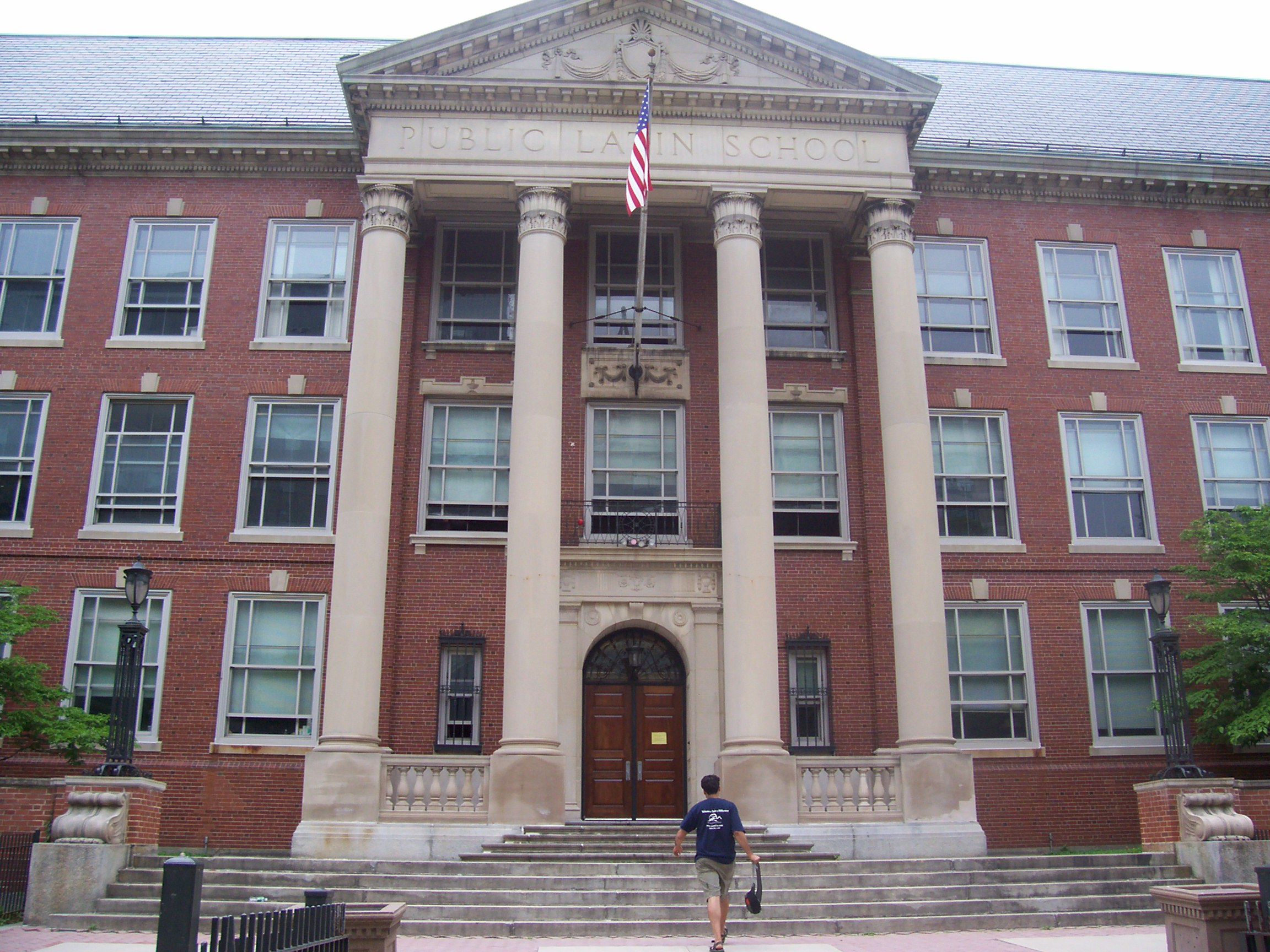
Boston Latin School, the oldest public high school in the United States

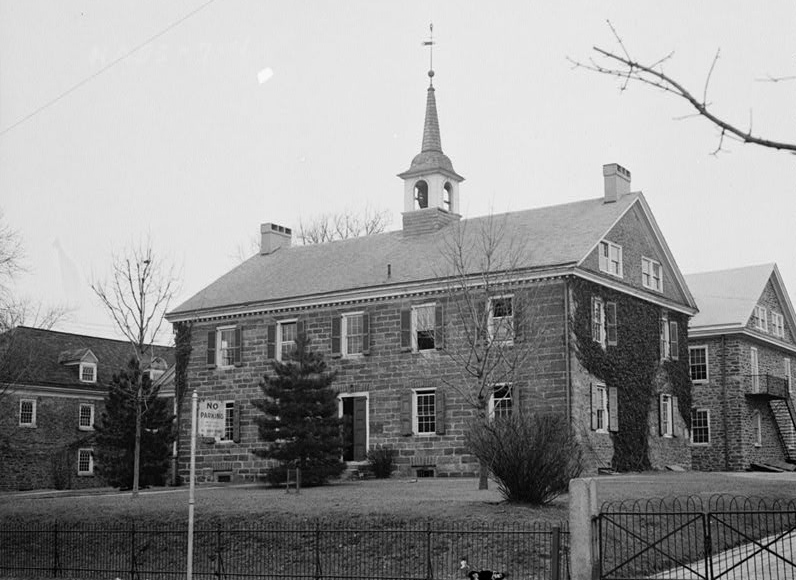
Original building of Germantown Academy, the oldest nonsectarian day school in the United States

The following are the oldest public high schools in the United States that are still in operation. While some of these schools have operated as private schools in the past, all are currently public schools. The list does not include schools that have closed or consolidated with another school to form a new institution. The list is ordered by date of creation, and currently includes schools formed before 1870.

1. Boston Latin School (1635), Boston, Massachusetts
2. Hartford Public High School (1638), Hartford, Connecticut
3. Cambridge Rindge and Latin School (1648), Cambridge, Massachusetts
4. Hopkins School (1660), New Haven, Connecticut
5. Hopkins Academy (1664), Hadley, Massachusetts
6. Academy of Richmond County (1773), Augusta, Georgia
7. Erasmus Hall (1786), Brooklyn, New York
8. Glynn Academy (1788), Brunswick, Georgia
9. Canandaigua Academy (1791), Canandaigua, New York
10. Westford Academy (1792), Westford, Massachusetts
11. Oxford Academy and Central Schools (1794), Oxford, New York
12. New London Acadamey (1795), Forest, Virginia
13. Newburgh Free Academy (1796), Newburgh, New York
14. Woodstock Academy (1801), Woodstock, Connecticut ("a quasi-private, independent school")
15. Monmouth Academy (1803), Monmouth, Maine
16. Bacon Academy (1803), Colchester, Connecticut
17. Hampden Academy (1803), Hampden, Maine
18. Pinkerton Academy (1814), Derry, New Hampshire (not strictly public, yet not private)
19. Columbia High School (1814), Maplewood, New Jersey
20. Cony High School (1815), Augusta, Maine
21. Bel Air High School (1816), Bel Air, Maryland
22. Pembroke Academy (1818), Pembroke, New Hampshire
23. Delaware Academy (1819), Delhi, New York
24. English High School of Boston (1821), Boston, Massachusetts
25. Portland High School (1821), Portland, Maine
26. Kentucky School for the Deaf (1823), Danville, Kentucky
27. Prattsburgh Central School (1823), Prattsburgh, New York
28. New Bedford High School (1827), New Bedford, Massachusetts
29. Norcross High School (1827), Norcross, Georgia
30. Keene High School (1828), Keene, New Hampshire
31. Elyria High School (1830), Elyria, Ohio
32. Lahainaluna High School (1831), Maui, Hawaii
33. Leon High School (1831), Tallahassee, Florida
34. Lowell High School (1831), Lowell, Massachusetts
35. Newburyport High School (1831), Newburyport, Massachusetts
36. Woodward High School (1831), Cincinnati, Ohio
37. Cambridge High School (1834), Cambridge, Illinois
38. Medford High School (1835), Medford, Massachusetts
39. Bellevue High School (1836), Bellevue, Michigan
40. Central High School (1836), Philadelphia, Pennsylvania
41. Auburn High School (1837), Auburn, Alabama
42. Windsor High School (1837), Windsor, New York
43. Barringer High School (1838), Newark, New Jersey
44. Cohasset High School (1838), Cohasset, Massachusetts
45. Nantucket High School (1838), Nantucket, Massachusetts
46. Taunton High School (1838), Taunton, Massachusetts
47. Virginia School for the Deaf and Blind (1838), Staunton, Virginia
48. Baltimore City College (1839), Baltimore, Maryland
49. Gloucester High School (1839), Gloucester, Massachusetts
50. Middletown High School (1840), Middletown, Connecticut
51. Brighton High School (1841), Boston, Massachusetts
52. Haverhill High School (1841), Haverhill, Massachusetts
53. Warren Easton Charter High School, formerly known as Boys High School (1843), New Orleans, Louisiana
54. Brookline High School (1843), Brookline, Massachusetts
55. Classical High School (1843), Providence, Rhode Island
56. Drury High School (1843), North Adams, Massachusetts
57. Tennessee School for the Deaf (1844), Knoxville, Tennessee
58. Western High School (1844), Baltimore, Maryland
59. Charlestown High School (1845), Boston, Massachusetts
60. Lyons High School (1845), Lyons, New York
61. Mary D. Bradford High School (1845), Kenosha, Wisconsin
62. New Braunfels High School (1845), New Braunfels, Texas
63. Windsor High School (1845), Windsor, Vermont
64. Chelsea High School (1846), Chelsea, Massachusetts
65. Concord High School (1846), Concord, New Hampshire
66. Georgia School for the Deaf (1846), Cave Spring, Georgia
67. Manchester Central High School (1846), Manchester, New Hampshire
68. Pine Tree High School (1847), Longview, Texas
69. Biddeford High School (1848), Biddeford, Maine
70. Lockport High School (1848), Lockport, New York
71. Philadelphia High School for Girls (1848), Philadelphia, Pennsylvania
72. B.M.C. Durfee High School (1849), Fall River, Massachusetts
73. Charlotte High School (1849), Charlotte, Michigan
74. Fitchburg High School (1849), Fitchburg, Massachusetts
75. Lawrence High School (1849), Lawrence, Massachusetts
76. Rockport High School (1849), Rockport, Massachusetts
77. Waltham High School (1849), Waltham, Massachusetts
78. Ypsilanti High School (1849), Ypsilanti, Michigan
79. Innovation Central High School (1850), Grand Rapids, Michigan (AKA Grand Rapids High School)
80. Somerville High School (1852), Somerville, Massachusetts
81. Central High School (Commonly called Central VPA High School) (1853), St. Louis, Missouri
82. Pottsville Area High School (1853), Pottsville, Pennsylvania
83. Holmes Junior/Senior High School (1853), Covington, Kentucky
84. New Albany High School (1853), New Albany, Indiana
85. Arundel High School (1854), Gambrills, Maryland
86. Norwich Free Academy (1854), Norwich, Connecticut (a "quasi-private school," "privately governed, independent secondary school")
87. Weymouth High School (1854)
88. Sacramento High School (1856), Sacramento, California
89. Andover High School (1856), Andover, Massachusetts
90. Louisville Male High School (1856), Louisville, Kentucky
91. Lowell High School (1856), San Francisco, California
92. Pioneer High School (1856), Ann Arbor, Michigan
93. Peoria High School (1856), Peoria, Illinois
94. Texas School for the Deaf (1856), Austin, Texas
95. University High School (1857), Normal, Illinois
96. Braintree High School (1858), Braintree, Massachusetts
97. Ravenna High School (1858), Ravenna, Ohio
98. Hillhouse High School (1859), New Haven, Connecticut
99. Central High School, formerly known as St. Joseph High School (1861), St. Joseph, Missouri
100. San Jose High School (1863), San Jose, California
101. Shortridge High School (1864), Indianapolis, Indiana
102. Loyola High School (1865), Los Angeles, California
103. Saint Paul Central High School (1866), Saint Paul, Minnesota
104. Hastings Senior High School (1866), Hastings, Minnesota
105. Wilson High School (1866), Florence, South Carolina
106. Alfred Ely Beach High School (1867), Savannah, Georgia
107. Parkersburg High School (1867), Parkersburg, West Virginia
108. Round Rock High School (1867), Round Rock, Texas
109. Greely High School (1868), Cumberland, ME
110. Theodore Roosevelt High School (1868), Kent, Ohio
111. Morristown High School (1869), Morristown, New Jersey
112. Lincoln High School (1869), Portland, Oregon
113. Hunter College High School (1869), New York City, New York
114. Elgin High School (1869); Elgin, Illinois
115. Oakland High School, (1869), Oakland, California
116. Little Rock Central High School (1869), Little Rock, Arkansas

== See also ==
- List of oldest schools
- List of the oldest private schools in the United States
