= List of the oldest private schools in the United States =

The following are the oldest private schools in the United States that are still in operation. The list does not include schools that have closed or consolidated with another school to form a new institution. The list is ordered by date of creation, and currently includes schools founded before 1830.

Current School Name	Founding Year	City/Location	State	Student Body	Grades Served	Residential Type	Religious Affiliation	Notes	References
Collegiate School	1628	New York City	New York	Boys Only	K-12	Day	Non-Sectarian	Chartered in 1638	
Roxbury Latin School	1645	West Roxbury	Massachusetts	Boys Only	7-12	Day	Non-Sectarian		
Hopkins School	1660	New Haven	Connecticut	Coeducational	7-12	Day	Non-Sectarian		
Friends Select School	1689	Philadelphia	Pennsylvania	Coeducational	PK-12	Day	Quaker		
William Penn Charter School	1689	Philadelphia	Pennsylvania	Coeducational	PK-12	Day	Quaker		
Abington Friends School	1697	Jenkintown	Pennsylvania	Coeducational	PK-12	Day	Quaker		
Trinity School	1709	New York City	New York	Coeducational	K-12	Day	Non-Sectarian		
Ursuline Academy	1727	New Orleans	Louisiana	Girls Only	PK-12	Day	Catholic		
Norfolk Academy	1728	Norfolk	Virginia	Coeducational	1-12	Day	Non-Sectarian		
Moravian Academy	1742	Bethlehem	Pennsylvania	Coeducational	PK-12	Day	Moravian Church		
St. Francis Academy	1743	Bally	Pennsylvania	Coeducational	K-8	Day	Catholic		
West Nottingham Academy	1744	Colora	Maryland	Coeducational	9-12	Boarding/Day	Non-Sectarian		
Linden Hall	1746	Lititz	Pennsylvania	Girls Only	6-12	Boarding/Day	Non-Sectarian		
Wilmington Friends School	1748	Wilmington	Delaware	Coeducational	PK-12	Day	Quaker		
Germantown Academy	1759	Fort Washington	Pennsylvania	Coeducational	PK-12	Day	Non-Sectarian		
The Governor's Academy	1763	Byfield	Massachusetts	Coeducational	9-12	Boarding/Day	Non-Sectarian		
Columbia Grammar and Preparatory School	1764	New York City	New York	Coeducational	PK-12	Day	Non-Sectarian		
Rutgers Preparatory School	1766	Somerset	New Jersey	Coeducational	PK-12	Day	Non-Sectarian		
Salem Academy	1772	Winston-Salem	North Carolina	Girls Only	9-12	Boarding/Day	Non-Sectarian		
Newark Academy	1774	Livingston	New Jersey	Coeducational	6-12	Day	Non-Sectarian		
Phillips Academy Andover	1778	Andover	Massachusetts	Coeducational	9-12	Boarding/Day	Non-Sectarian		
Plymouth Meeting Friends School	1780	Plymouth Meeting	Pennsylvania	Coeducational	PK-6	Day	Quaker		
Phillips Exeter Academy	1781	Exeter	New Hampshire	Coeducational	9-12	Boarding/Day	Non-Sectarian		
Derby Academy	1784	Hingham	Massachusetts	Coeducational	PK-8	Day	Non-Sectarian		
Friends School of Baltimore	1784	Baltimore	Maryland	Coeducational	PK-12	Day	Quaker		
Harrisburg Academy	1784	Wormleysburg	Pennsylvania	Coeducational	PK-12	Day	Non-Sectarian		
Moses Brown School	1784	Providence	Rhode Island	Coeducational	PK-12	Day	Quaker		
Moorestown Friends School	1785	Moorestown	New Jersey	Coeducational	PK-12	Day	Quaker		
Episcopal Academy	1785	Newtown Square	Pennsylvania	Coeducational	PK-12	Day	Episcopal Church		
Haddonfield Friends School	1786	Haddonfield	New Jersey	Coeducational	PK-8	Day	Quaker		
Friends Seminary	1786	New York City	New York	Coeducational	K-12	Day	Quaker		
Westfield Friends School	1788	Cinnaminson	New Jersey	Coeducational	PK-8	Day	Quaker		
Georgetown Preparatory School	1789	North Bethesda	Maryland	Boys Only	9-12	Boarding/Day	Catholic		
Alexander Robertson School	1789	New York City	New York	Coeducational	PK-5	Day	Non-Sectarian		
Berwick Academy	1791	South Berwick	Maine	Coeducational	PK-12	Day	Non-Sectarian		
Fryeburg Academy	1792	Fryeburg	Maine	Coeducational	9-12	Boarding/Day	Non-Sectarian		
Washington Academy	1792	East Machias	Maine	Coeducational	9-12	Boarding/Day	Non-Sectarian		
Lawrence Academy	1793	Groton	Massachusetts	Coeducational	9-12	Boarding/Day	Non-Sectarian		
Cheshire Academy	1794	Cheshire	Connecticut	Coeducational	9-12	Boarding/Day	Non-Sectarian		
Buckingham Friends School	1794	Lahaska	Pennsylvania	Coeducational	K-8	Day	Quaker		
Oakwood Friends School	1796	Poughkeepsie	New York	Coeducational	6-12	Day	Quaker		
Deerfield Academy	1797	Deerfield	Massachusetts	Coeducational	9-12	Boarding/Day	Non-Sectarian		
Milton Academy	1798	Milton	Massachusetts	Coeducational	K-12	Boarding/Day	Non-Sectarian		
Westtown School	1799	West Chester	Pennsylvania	Coeducational	PK-12	Boarding/Day	Quaker		
Georgetown Visitation	1799	Washington	District of Columbia	Girls Only	9-12	Day	Catholic		
Hebron Academy	1804	Hebron	Maine	Coeducational	6-PG	Boarding/Day	Non-Sectarian		
Foxcroft Academy	1823	Dover - Foxcroft	Maine	Coeducational	9-12	Boarding/Day	Non- Sectarian		
Kents Hill School	1824	Kents Hill	Maine	Coeducational	9-PG	Boarding/Day	Non-Sectarian		
Greenwich Academy	1827	Greenwich	Connecticut	Girls Only	PC-12	Day	Non-Sectarian		

== See also ==
- List of oldest schools
- List of the oldest public high schools in the United States
