= Higher education in Spain =

In Spain, higher education is a non-mandatory stage of formal learning following secondary education. It covers stages 5 to 8 on the International ISCED 2011 scale. It is delivered by a wide range of institutions, including universities—92 as of 2026—, the majority of which are publicly funded. Around forty of them are private, with fourteen affiliated with the Catholic Church or Christian-inspired. The Spanish higher education system traces its origins to medieval and Islamic educational institutions, notably with the foundation of the University of Salamanca in 1218, one of the oldest universities in continuous operation in Europe. During the Spanish Empire, universities and schools played a central role in administrative and missionary efforts across Spain and its colonies.

Following the reforms associated with the European Higher Education Area (EHEA), Spain transitioned from traditional degrees such as the Licenciatura and Diplomatura to a system based on the título de grado (Bachelor's degree) and título de máster (Master's degree). Admission to Spanish universities is competitive and based on academic performance and entrance examinations. Spanish universities are regularly featured in global and national rankings, with institutions such as the Universitat de Barcelona, Universitat Autònoma de Barcelona, and Universidad Autónoma de Madrid consistently placing highly.

For academic year 2024–25, 1.827 million students were enrolled in any type of university education. Of the enrolled students, 77.5 % of them enrolled in a four-year institution (77 % in a public institution while 23 % in a private one), while 17.1 % were enrolled in a Master's degree (53 % private; 47 % public ) and 5.4 % in a Doctorate program (93–7 % in favour of public institutions). To this we must add 0.598 million students who were studying a Higher Vocational Training degree in the 2023–24 academic year (63 % in public centres).

== History ==
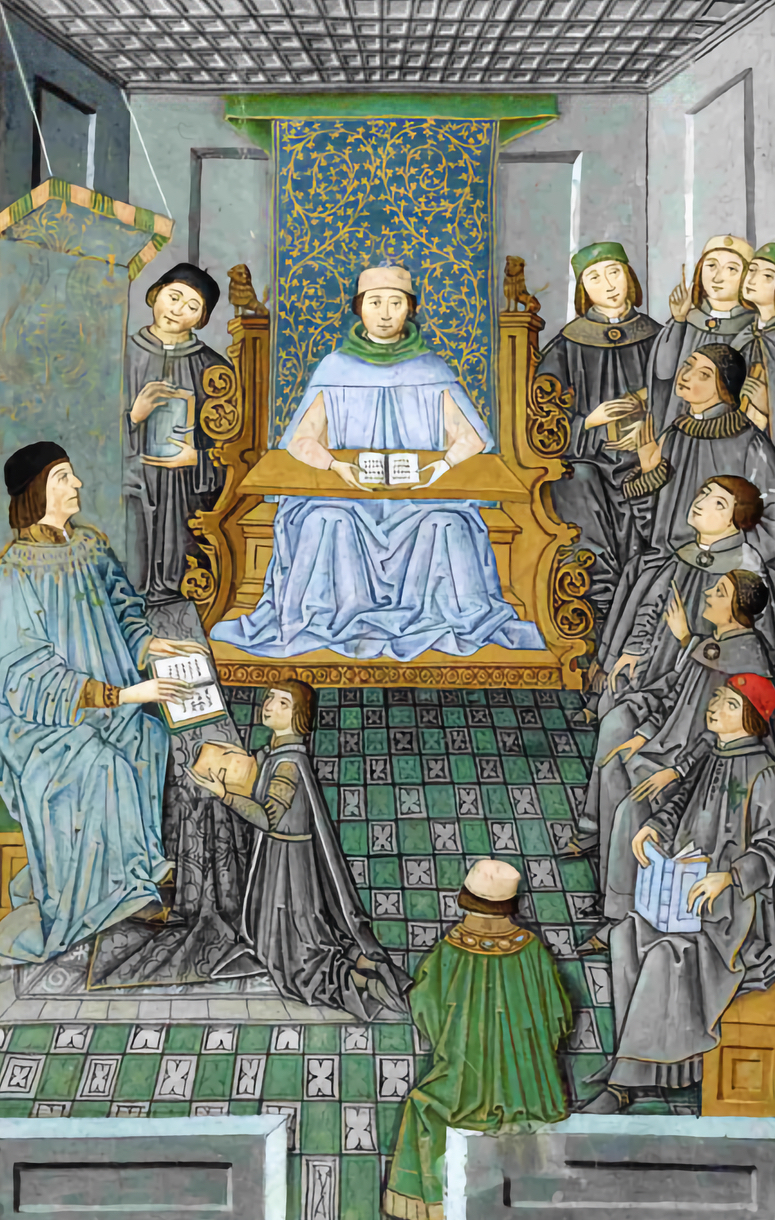
Antonio de Nebrija teaching grammar in the presence of Juan de Zúñiga y Pimentel.

The origins of higher education in Spain date back to Al-Andalus, the period of Islamic rule. Madrasahs were established in the Andalusian cities of Córdoba, Seville, Toledo, Granada (Madrasah of Granada), Murcia, Almería, Valencia and Cádiz during the Caliphate of Córdoba.

Problems of definition make it difficult to date the origins of universities. The first medieval European universities were simply groups of scholars, the word "university" being derived from the Latin universitas, meaning corporation. Nonetheless, the University of Palencia appears to have been the first high education institution in Spain, while the University of Salamanca (Universidad de Salamanca) is the oldest existing Spanish university. Founded in 1218, during a period of expansion that had begun in the 11th century, this University is considered to be one of the oldest in Western Europe. The university was founded as a "General School of the kingdom" by King Alfonso IX of León in 1218 so that the Leonese people could study at home without having to leave for Castile.

The reign of Ferdinand, King of Aragon, and Isabella I, Queen of Castile, saw a professionalisation of the apparatus of government in Spain, which led to a demand for men of letters (letrados) who were university graduates (licenciados), of Salamanca, Valladolid and Alcalá de Henares. These men staffed the various councils of state, including, eventually, the Consejo de Indias and Casa de Contratacion, the two highest bodies in metropolitan Spain for the government of the Spanish Empire in the New World.

Many of the medieval universities in Western Europe were born under the aegis of the Catholic Church, usually as cathedral schools or by papal bull as Studia Generali. In the early medieval period, most new universities were founded from pre-existing schools, usually when these schools were deemed to have become primarily sites of higher education. Many historians state that universities and cathedral schools were a continuation of the interest in learning promoted by monasteries.

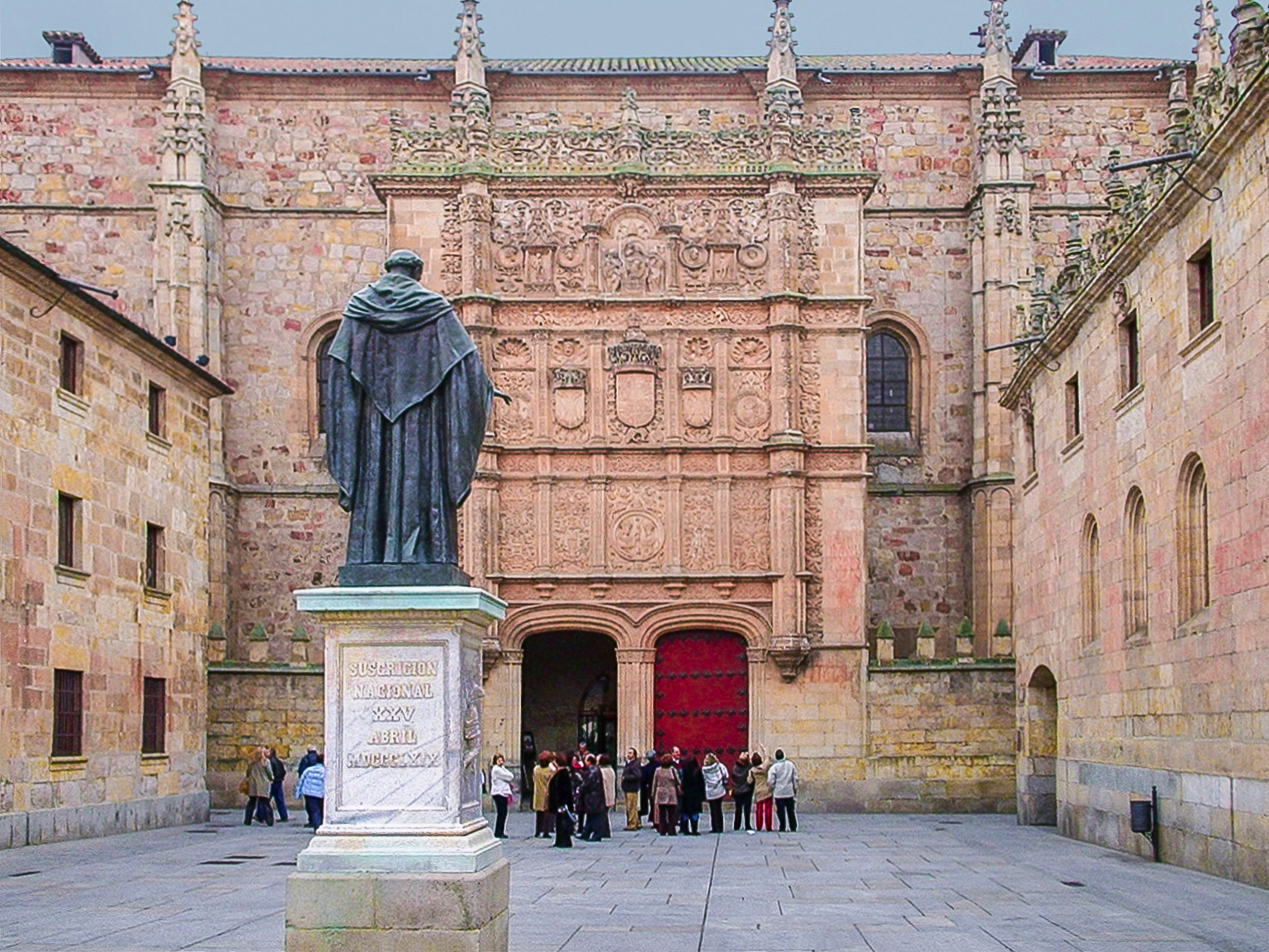
University of Salamanca is the oldest university in the Hispanic world and one of the oldest in the world in continuous operation.

In Europe, young men proceeded to university when they had completed their study of the trivium–the preparatory arts of grammar, rhetoric, and logic–and the quadrivium: arithmetic, geometry, music, and astronomy. (See degrees of Oxford University for the history of how the trivium and quadrivium developed in relation to degrees, especially in anglophone universities).

Several of the world's oldest universities are located in Spain or were founded by Spanish scholars across the world at the time of the Spanish Empire.

The University of Salamanca, founded by King Alfonso IX of Leon in 1218 is the world's 8th oldest university. The oldest existing universities both in Asia (University of Santo Tomas) and the Americas (University of Santo Domingo) were founded by Spanish religious orders in the 16th century.

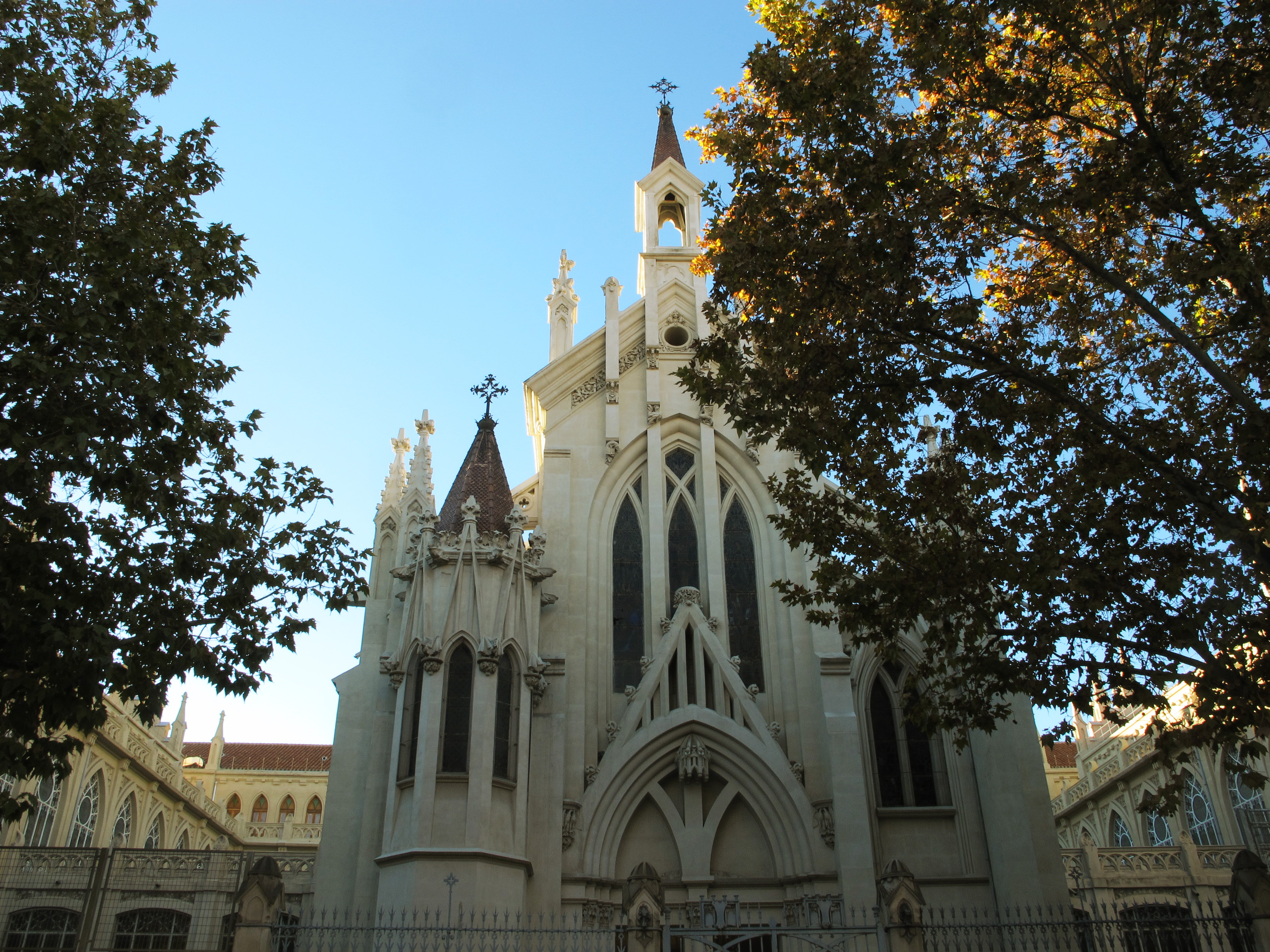
El Pilar is a school with a long list of old boys (former pupils), including one Prime Minister.

The creation of the Spanish Empire brought a significant expansion in royal positions for university-trained lawyer-bureaucrats who were not nobles and were dependent on and loyal to the crown. The multiple royal councils needed university-trained men, as did royal government in the Indies. These were men who had studied Roman Law. "The law schools of universities were the training ground of the Crown's advisers." The first medieval European universities were simply groups of scholars, the word "university" being derived from the Latin universitas, meaning corporation. The University of Palencia appears to have been the first high education institution in Spain and the third in the world, after Bologna and Oxford, while the University of Salamanca is the oldest existing Spanish university. Founded in 1218, during a period of expansion that had begun in the 11th century, Salamanca is considered to be the third oldest in Western Europe. The university was founded as a "General School of the kingdom" by Alfonso IX in 1218 so that the Leonese people could study at home without having to leave for Castile.

From the Imperial School to St. Bartholomew's College or Our Lady of Mount Zion, the Spanish set up a solid educational system as well as one of the first prominent fee-paying schools in Europe. Stonyhurst College in Lancashire, was one of the many English boarding schools founded by Spanish Jesuits under the Empire, and was originally established in the Spanish Netherlands in 1593. The aim of these schools was to provide English boys with a Roman Catholic education during the rule of Elizabeth I.

High-ranking army men and senior administrators of the empire usually pursued a rigorous education for their sons in Spain. The aim was to continue producing future leaders to serve the Spanish Empire and its interests, often resulting in a well-developed final product of colonial governors. Most of these schools were established by Catholic orders such as the Jesuits, with the intention of emphasizing catholic values at heart, since the Catholic Church was arguably the greatest promoter of the Spanish Empire.

Before the new European Higher Education Area, degrees included

- Licenciatura or ingeniería, can last four, five or six years.
- Diplomatura or ingeniería técnica, degree courses of shorter duration, 3 years.

== Universities ==
The creation of public universities, or the recognition of private ones, is carried out by law, either by the Cortes Generales or by a regional legislature (Article 4, LOSU). Article 27(10) of the Spanish Constitution guarantees university autonomy, allowing universities to freely establish their own educational and research policies, as well as regulate their internal regime and their staff and financial policies. This autonomy also includes academic freedom and the obligation of the competent public authorities to ensure that universities and their centers have the necessary financial resources to exercise it (Article 3, LOSU).

The central government is responsible for establishing, by royal decree—Royal Decree 640/2021, of July 27—the basic conditions and requirements for the creation of public universities and the recognition of private universities, as well as for the development of their activities, while the regional governments are responsible for authorizing the start of their activities once it has been verified that the conditions and requirements established by the central government are met. Subsequently, these governments are also entrusted with the supervision and control of their activity and, where appropriate, the revocation of the authorization (Article 4, LOSU).

For academic year 2024–25, there were 92 universities in Spain: 50 public and 42 private.

== Organization of official degrees ==
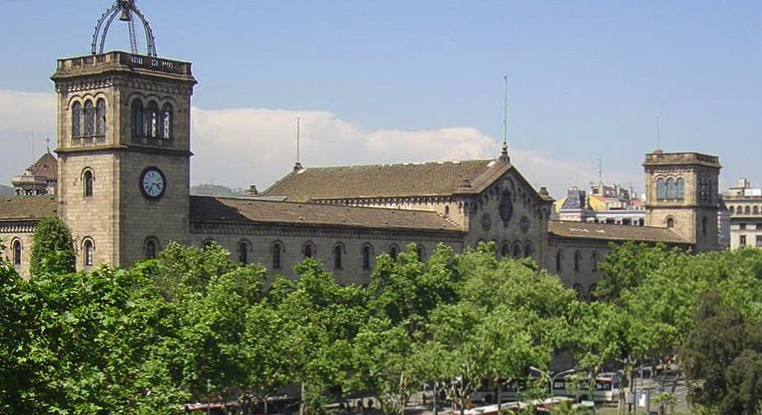
University of Barcelona

The education structure for official titles is provided in Organic Law 2/2023, of March 22, on the University System (LOSU) and Royal Decree 822/2021, of September 28, which establishes the organization of university teaching and the procedure for ensuring its quality (RDOEUC). Following the Bologna Process, this norms divide the official university education in three levels:

- Grade. Known internationally as a Bachelor's degree, it is the first level of university education and it aims to give students a basic and general education in a specific discipline. To access bachelor's studies, a Baccalaureate title and passing the university access exam are required (Article 38, 2006 Organic Education Law). Graduates of advanced vocational training programs may also access bachelor's degrees (Article 148, Royal Decree 659/2023, of July 18).
  - As a general rule, bachelor's degrees consist of 240 ECTS credits divided into four years of 60 credits each. Therefore, they are equivalent to MECES 2. There may also be special bachelor's degree programs of 300 and 360 credits. Both types of degrees require obtaining the required credits and completing a final degree project, which will cover between 6 and 24 credits for basic degrees, and up to 30 or 36 credits in the case of special degrees (Article 14, RDOEUC).
- University Master. Master's degree programs aim to provide advanced training, either thematically specialized or multidisciplinary/interdisciplinary, geared towards academic or professional specialization, or geared towards initiating research activities. Admission to Master's programs requires a Bachelor's degree, another Master's degree, or their equivalent (Article 18, RDOEUC).
  - Master's degrees consist of 60, 90 or 120 ECTS credits, equivalent to a MECES 3. To obtain them, it is necessary to obtain all the planned credits and pass the final master's project, which can cover between 6 and 30 credits out of the total (Article 17, RDOEUC).
- Doctorate. Doctorate programs (PhD) constitute the third level of higher education and aim to develop the skills and competencies related to research within a scientific, technical, humanistic, artistic, or cultural field of knowledge. As a general rule, admission to doctoral studies requires a Bachelor's and Master's degree, or equivalent, with at least 300 ECTS credits (Article 6, Royal Decree 99/2011, of January 28).
  - Unlike other university levels, doctoral studies are not credit-based. They consist of doctoral programs lasting a maximum of four years full-time or, exceptionally, seven years part-time. For individuals with a disability of 33 % or more, these periods are extended to six and nine years, respectively (Article 3, Royal Decree 99/2011).
  - The person who is going to get a doctorate will sign a paid predoctoral contract with a duration of no less than one year and no more than four years (Article 21, 2011 Science Law), for the simultaneous performance of research tasks in a specific and novel project and, on the other hand, the set of activities, which are part of the doctoral program, leading to the acquisition of the skills and abilities necessary to obtain the official university degree of Doctorate (Article 4, Royal Decree 103/2019, of March 1).

== Non-official degrees ==
Universities, in exercising their right to university autonomy, may establish their own degrees (Article 6.6, LOSU). These degrees are regulated by each university according to its internal regulations and are valid only within that university. University-specific degrees must have a name that does not cause confusion with official degrees, and students must always be given adequate information to distinguish between official and university-specific degrees (Article 36, RDOEUC).

== Governance ==
Education in Spain is a shared responsibility between the central and regional governments. University education enjoys its own autonomy, but the central government is responsible for designing the regulatory framework, while the regions exercise oversight.

Thus, at the apex of the Spanish university system is the department of the General State Administration with university responsibilities, currently the Ministry of Science, Innovation and Universities, which is supported by the relevant regional departments. Additionally, the governing bodies of each university exercise, with respect to their respective centers, those powers conferred upon them by the Organic Law on the University System and their statutes to guarantee their autonomy.

To coordinate these actors, there are three bodies for cooperation and coordination: the General Conference on University Policy (Article 15, LOSU)—intergovernmental coordination—, the University Council (Article 16, LOSU)—for Ministry and rectors coordination—and the State University Student Council (Article 17, LOSU)—for communication and debate between government and students—, all of them chaired by the minister of universities. Universities also have the Conference of Rectors of Spanish Universities (CRUE), an association that coordinates and promotes collaboration among them.

== Ranking ==
There are several rankings for Spanish Universities. The best known ones are the Shanghai Jiao Tong, QS and THE Ranking. These are international rankings, however, there are also some national rankings comprising the "50 carreras" (50 degrees) from the "El Mundo" newspaper, the CSIC or the IAIF ranking of the UCM.

Spain's Higher Educations system has been ranked top-5th by the Spanish CSIC only after the United States, Germany, the United Kingdom and Canada.

== National Rankings ==
=== U-Ranking 2020 ===
It was published in 2020 and done by the Banco Bilbao Vizcaya Argentaria and Instituto Valenciano de Investigaciones Económicas.

Nº	Universidad	Score
1	Universidad Pompeu Fabra	1.5
2-5	Universitat Autònoma de Barcelona	1.4
2-5	Universidad Politécnica de Cataluña	1.4
2-5	Universidad Carlos III	1.4
2-5	Universitat Politècnica de València	1.4
6-10	Universitat de Barcelona	1.3
6-10	Universidad de Navarra	1.3
6-10	Universidad de Cantabria	1.3
6-10	Universitat Rovira i Virgili (Tarragona)	1.3
6-10	Universidad Autónoma de Madrid	1.3

=== 50 Carreras (El Mundo) ===
It is a well known ranking in Spain and it is published every year by the national newspaper "El Mundo".

2019 Ranking	University
1	Universitat Autònoma de Barcelona
2	Universidad Complutense de Madrid
3	Universidad Autónoma de Madrid
4	Universitat de Barcelona
5	Universidad Politécnica de Madrid
5	Universidad Carlos III
6	Universitat Politècnica de València
7-8	Universidad Politécnica de Cataluña
7-8	Universidad de Navarra
9	Universidad de Sevilla
10-11	Universidad Pompeu Fabra
10-11	Universidad Rey Juan Carlos

== International Rankings ==
=== The Times Higher Education Ranking ===
2021 Ranking	University
1	Universitat Pompeu Fabra
2	Universitat Autònoma de Barcelona
3	Universitat de Barcelona
4	University of Navarra
5	Autonomous University of Madrid
6	University of Valencia
7	Complutense University of Madrid

=== QS Ranking ===
Published annually since 2004, QS World University Rankings® is one of the most complete and trusted university ranking in the world.

2020 Ranking	University
1	Universitat de Barcelona
2	Universidad Autónoma de Madrid
3	Universidad Complutense de Madrid
4	Universitat Autònoma de Barcelona
5	Universidad de Navarra
6	Universitat Pompeu Fabra
7	Universidad Carlos III de Madrid
8	Universitat Politècnica de Catalunya
9	Universitat Politècnica de València

=== Shanghai Ranking ===
The Academic Ranking of World Universities (ARWU) is first published in June 2003 by the Center for World-Class Universities (CWCU), Graduate School of Education (formerly the Institute of Higher Education) of Shanghai Jiao Tong University, China, and updated on an annual basis. Despite its prestige, many people criticize them because they don't take into account the size of the universities for their rankings.

2019 Ranking	University
1	Universitat de Barcelona
2-5	Universitat de València
2-5	Universidad de Granada
2-5	Universitat Autònoma de Barcelona
2-5	Universidad Complutense de Madrid
6-7	Universidad Autónoma de Madrid
6-7	Universitat Pompeu Fabra

=== Round University Ranking ===
2020 Ranking	University
1	Universitat de Barcelona
2	Autonomous University of Barcelona
3	Autonomous University of Madrid
4	Pompeu Fabra University
5	Universidad de Navarra
6	University of Zaragoza
7	Complutense University of Madrid
8	Universitat Politècnica de Catalunya
9	University of Valencia
10	University of Rovira i Virgili

== See also ==
- Academic ranks in Spain
- ANECA, the accreditation body
- Education in Spain
  - List of universities in Spain (organised by autonomous community)
  - British universities
  - Dutch universities
  - French universities
  - German universities
  - Italian universities
  - Portuguese universities
