= Our Lady of Mount Zion College =

Coordinates: 39°34′1.18″N 2°39′10.42″E

- Colegio Nuestra Señora de Montesión
- Palma, Majorca, Spain

Information
- Type: Jesuit, Catholic
- Established: 1561; 465 years ago
- Director: Peter B. Ramón
- Grades: Primary through baccalaureate and middle-level training
- Gender: Coeducational
- Enrollment: 1,400
- Publication: Revista de Montesión
- Alumni: Old Zionists
- Website: Colegio Nuestra Señora de Montesión

Our Lady of Mount Zion College (Colegio Nuestra Señora de Montesión) was one of the first Jesuits schools in the world, founded in 1561. Today from its two locations in Palma, Majorca, Spain, it educates from primary through baccalaureate and two training cycles.

== History ==
In 2011, Montesión celebrated the fact that it was founded 450 years ago.

During the expulsion of the Jesuits between 1767 and 1824 the Colegio de Montesión de Palma building was used as a university from 1769-1816 and 1820-1824. Briefly in 1812 it became the Royal College of Artillery. In the second expulsion of the Jesuits between 1837 and 1919, the Balearic Institute (1837-1916) and the Public Library (1835-1855) were established in the building.

The school was the owner of the Librería Juliana, a large collection of books and manuscripts from the 17th and 18th centuries; they were seized during the Franco era The College is also noted for its collection of ceramics.

== See also ==
- List of Jesuit sites
