= 1935 in the United States =

- Decades: 1910s; 1920s; 1930s; 1940s; 1950s
- See also: History of the United States (1918–1945); Timeline of United States history (1930–1949); List of years in the United States

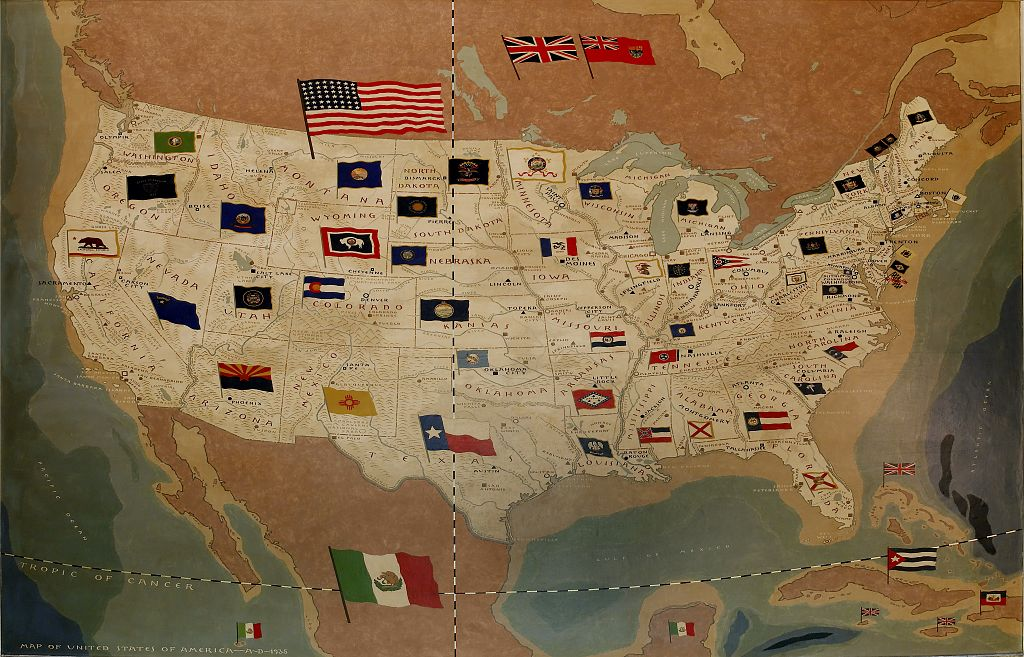
1935 map of the United States showing state flags, painted by Ethel Parsons for the Albany post office

Events from the year 1935 in the United States.

== Incumbents ==
=== Federal government ===
- President: Franklin D. Roosevelt (D-New York)
- Vice President: John Nance Garner (D-Texas)
- Chief Justice: Charles Evans Hughes (New York)
- Speaker of the House of Representatives: Joseph W. Byrns, Sr. (D-Tennessee)
- Senate Majority Leader: Joseph Taylor Robinson (D-Arkansas)
- Congress: 73rd (until January 3), 74th (starting January 3)

==== State governments ====
Governors and lieutenant governors

=== Governors ===
- Governor of Alabama: Benjamin M. Miller (Democratic) (until January 14), Bibb Graves (Democratic) (starting January 14)
- Governor of Arizona: Benjamin Baker Moeur (Democratic)
- Governor of Arkansas: Junius Marion Futrell (Democratic)
- Governor of California: Frank Merriam (Republican)
- Governor of Colorado: Edwin C. Johnson (Democratic)
- Governor of Connecticut: Wilbur Lucius Cross (Democratic)
- Governor of Delaware: C. Douglass Buck (Republican)
- Governor of Florida: David Sholtz (Democratic)
- Governor of Georgia: Eugene Talmadge (Democratic)
- Governor of Idaho: C. Ben Ross (Democratic)
- Governor of Illinois: Henry Horner (Democratic)
- Governor of Indiana: Paul V. McNutt (Democratic)
- Governor of Iowa: Clyde L. Herring (Democratic)
- Governor of Kansas: Alfred M. Landon (Republican)
- Governor of Kentucky: Ruby Laffoon (Democratic) (until December 10), Happy Chandler (Democratic) (starting December 10)
- Governor of Louisiana: Oscar K. Allen (Democratic)
- Governor of Maine: Louis J. Brann (Democratic)
- Governor of Maryland: Albert C. Ritchie (Democratic) (until January 9), Harry W. Nice (Republican) (starting January 9)
- Governor of Massachusetts: Joseph B. Ely (Democratic) (until January 3), James Michael Curley (Democratic) (starting January 3)
- Governor of Michigan: William Comstock (Democratic) (until January 1), Frank Fitzgerald (Republican) (starting January 1)
- Governor of Minnesota: Floyd B. Olson (Farmer–Labor)
- Governor of Mississippi: Martin Sennett Conner (Democratic)
- Governor of Missouri: Guy Brasfield Park (Democratic)
- Governor of Montana: Frank Henry Cooney (Democratic) (until December 15), Elmer Holt (Democratic) (starting December 15)
- Governor of Nebraska: Charles W. Bryan (Democratic) (until January 3), Robert Leroy Cochran (Democratic) (starting January 3)
- Governor of Nevada: Morley Griswold (Republican) (until January 7), Richard Kirman, Sr. (Democratic) (starting January 7)
- Governor of New Hampshire: John Gilbert Winant (Republican) (until January 3), Styles Bridges (Republican) (starting January 3)
- Governor of New Jersey:
  - until January 3: A. Harry Moore (Democratic)
  - January 3-8: Clifford Ross Powell (Republican)
  - January 8-15: Horace Griggs Prall (Republican)
  - starting January 15: Harold G. Hoffman (Republican)
- Governor of New Mexico: Andrew W. Hockenhull (Democratic) (until January 1), Clyde Tingley (Democratic) (starting January 1)
- Governor of New York: Herbert H. Lehman (Democratic)
- Governor of North Carolina: John C. B. Ehringhaus (Democratic)
- Governor of North Dakota:
  - until January 7: Ole H. Olson (Republican)
  - January 7-February 2: Thomas H. Moodie (Democratic)
  - starting February 2: Walter Welford (Republican)
- Governor of Ohio: George White (Democratic) (until January 14), Martin L. Davey (Democratic) (starting January 14)
- Governor of Oklahoma: William H. Murray (Democratic) (until January 14), Ernest W. Marland (Democratic) (starting January 14)
- Governor of Oregon: Julius L. Meier (Independent) (until January 14), Charles H. Martin (Democratic) (starting January 14)
- Governor of Pennsylvania: Gifford Pinchot (Republican) (until January 15), George Howard Earle III (Democratic) (starting January 15)
- Governor of Rhode Island: Theodore Francis Green (Democratic)
- Governor of South Carolina: Ibra Charles Blackwood (Democratic) (until January 15), Olin D. Johnston (Democratic) (starting January 15)
- Governor of South Dakota: Tom Berry (Democratic)
- Governor of Tennessee: Harry Hill McAlister (Democratic)
- Governor of Texas: Miriam A. Ferguson (Democratic) (until January 15), James V. Allred (Democratic) (starting January 15)
- Governor of Utah: Henry H. Blood (Democratic)
- Governor of Vermont: Stanley C. Wilson (Republican) (until January 10), Charles M. Smith (Republican) (starting January 10)
- Governor of Virginia: George C. Peery (Democratic)
- Governor of Washington: Clarence D. Martin (Democratic)
- Governor of West Virginia: Herman G. Kump (Democratic)
- Governor of Wisconsin: Albert G. Schmedeman (Democratic) (until January 7), Philip La Follette (Wisconsin Progressive) (starting January 7)
- Governor of Wyoming: Leslie A. Miller (Democratic)

=== Lieutenant governors ===
- Lieutenant Governor of Alabama: Hugh D. Merrill (Democratic) (until January 14), Thomas E. Knight (Democratic) (starting January 14)
- Lieutenant Governor of Arkansas: William Lee Cazort (Democratic)
- Lieutenant Governor of California: vacant (starting January 8), George J. Hatfield (Republican) (starting January 8)
- Lieutenant Governor of Colorado: Raymond Herbert Talbot (Democratic)
- Lieutenant Governor of Connecticut: Roy C. Wilcox (Republican) (starting month and day unknown), T. Frank Hayes (Democratic) (starting month and day unknown)
- Lieutenant Governor of Delaware: Roy F. Corley (Republican)
- Lieutenant Governor of Idaho: George E. Hill (Democratic) (until January 7), G. P. Mix (Democratic) (starting January 7)
- Lieutenant Governor of Illinois: Thomas Donovan (Democratic)
- Lieutenant Governor of Indiana: M. Clifford Townsend (Democratic)
- Lieutenant Governor of Iowa: Nelson G. Kraschel (Democratic)
- Lieutenant Governor of Kansas: Charles W. Thompson (Republican)
- Lieutenant Governor of Kentucky: Happy Chandler (Democratic) (until December 10), Keen Johnson (Democratic) (starting December 10)
- Lieutenant Governor of Louisiana:
  - until month and day unknown: John B. Fournet (Democratic)
  - month and day unknown: Thomas C. Wingate (Democratic)
  - starting month and day unknown: James A. Noe (Democratic)
- Lieutenant Governor of Massachusetts: Gaspar G. Bacon (Republican) (until January 3), Joseph L. Hurley (Democratic) (starting January 3)
- Lieutenant Governor of Michigan: Allen E. Stebbins (Democratic) (until month and day unknown), Thomas Read (Republican) (starting month and day unknown)
- Lieutenant Governor of Minnesota: Konrad K. Solberg (Farmer Labor) (until January 8), Hjalmar Petersen (Farmer Labor) (starting January 8)
- Lieutenant Governor of Mississippi: Dennis Murphree (Democratic)
- Lieutenant Governor of Missouri: Frank Gaines Harris (Democratic)
- Lieutenant Governor of Montana: Elmer Holt (political party unknown) (until month and day unknown), William P. Pilgeram (Democratic) (starting month and day unknown)
- Lieutenant Governor of Nebraska: Walter H. Jurgensen (Democratic)
- Lieutenant Governor of Nevada: vacant (until month and day unknown), Fred S. Alward (political party unknown) (starting month and day unknown)
- Lieutenant Governor of New Mexico: vacant (until January 1), Louis Cabeza de Baca (Democratic) (starting January 1)
- Lieutenant Governor of New York: M. William Bray (Democratic)
- Lieutenant Governor of North Carolina: Alexander H. Graham (Democratic)
- Lieutenant Governor of North Dakota:
  - until January 2: vacant
  - January 2-February 7: Walter Welford (Republican)
  - starting February 7: vacant
- Lieutenant Governor of Ohio: Charles W. Sawyer (Democratic) (until January 14), Harold G. Mosier (Democratic) (starting January 14)
- Lieutenant Governor of Oklahoma: Robert Burns (Democratic) (until month and day unknown), James E. Berry (Democratic) (starting month and day unknown)
- Lieutenant Governor of Pennsylvania: Edward C. Shannon (Republican) (until January 15), Thomas Kennedy (Democratic) (starting January 15)
- Lieutenant Governor of Rhode Island: Robert E. Quinn (Democratic)
- Lieutenant Governor of South Carolina: James O. Sheppard (Democratic) (until January 15), Joseph Emile Harley (Democratic) (starting January 15)
- Lieutenant Governor of South Dakota: Hans Ustrud (Democratic) (until month and day unknown), Robert Peterson (Democratic) (starting month and day unknown)
- Lieutenant Governor of Tennessee: Albert F. Officer (Democratic) (until month and day unknown), William P. Moss (Democratic) (starting month and day unknown)
- Lieutenant Governor of Texas: Edgar E. Witt (Democratic) (until January 15), Walter Frank Woodul (Democratic) (starting January 15)
- Lieutenant Governor of Vermont: Charles M. Smith (Republican) (until January 10), George D. Aiken (Republican) (starting January 10)
- Lieutenant Governor of Virginia: James H. Price (Democratic)
- Lieutenant Governor of Washington: Victor A. Meyers (Democratic)
- Lieutenant Governor of Wisconsin: Thomas J. O'Malley (Democratic)

== Events ==
=== January–March ===
- January 3 – The trial of Richard Hauptmann, accused of the kidnapping and murder of Charles Lindbergh Jr., begins in Flemington, New Jersey.
- January 4 – Dry Tortugas National Park is established in the Florida Keys, United States.
- January 11 – Amelia Earhart becomes the first person to fly solo from Hawaii to California.
- January 14 – Bibb Graves is sworn in for a second consecutive term as the 38th governor of Alabama replacing Benjamin M. Miller.
- January 16 – The FBI kills the Barker Gang, including Ma Barker, in a shootout.
- January 19 – Coopers Inc. sells the world's first men's briefs, as "jockeys", in Chicago.
- February 7 – First known published use of the term "Ivy League".
- February 13 – Richard Hauptmann is convicted and sentenced to death for the Lindbergh kidnapping.
- February 22 – Airplanes are banned from flying over the White House.
- February 23 – The classic Mickey Mouse cartoon The Band Concert is released by United Artists in the United States.
- February 27 – The 7th Academy Awards, hosted by Irvin S. Cobb, are presented at Biltmore Hotel in Los Angeles, with Frank Capra's It Happened One Night becoming the first film to win all of the top five award categories, including Outstanding Production and Best Director. Victor Schertzinger's One Night of Love receives the most nominations with six.
- March 2 – Porky Pig makes his debut in Looney Tunes's I Haven't Got a Hat.
- March 19 – Harlem riot of 1935: A race riot breaks out in Harlem (New York City), after a rumor circulates that a teenage Puerto Rican shoplifter in the S. H. Kress & Co. department store has been brutally beaten.

=== April–June ===
- April 1 – The North American NA-16, prototype of the North American T-6 Texan or Harvard flying trainer, flies for the first time.
- April 14 – Dust Bowl: The great Black Sunday dust storm (made famous by Woody Guthrie in his "dust bowl ballads") hits hardest in eastern New Mexico and Colorado, and western Oklahoma.
- April 16 – Fibber McGee and Molly debuts on NBC Radio.
- May 6 – New Deal: Executive Order 7034 creates the Works Progress Administration (WPA).
- May 24 – The first nighttime Major League Baseball game is played, between the Cincinnati Reds and Philadelphia Phillies at Crosley Field in Cincinnati.
- May 27 – Schechter Poultry Corp. v. United States (the "Sick Chicken Case"): The Supreme Court of the United States declares that the National Industrial Recovery Act, a major component of the New Deal, is unconstitutional.
- May 30 – Eventual Baseball Hall of Famer Babe Ruth appears in his last career game, playing for the Boston Braves in Philadelphia against the Phillies.
- May 30–June 2 – 1935 Republican River flood (called "Nebraska's Deadliest Flood")
- June – National Youth Administration established.
- June 10 – Alcoholics Anonymous is founded in Akron, Ohio by Bill W. (William G. Wilson) and Dr. Bob (Smith).
- June 12–13 – Senator Huey Long of Louisiana makes the longest speech on Senate record, taking 15 1/2 hours and containing 150,000 words.
- June 13 – James J. Braddock defeats Max Baer at Madison Square Garden Bowl in New York City to win the heavyweight boxing championship of the world.

=== July–September ===
- July 6 – The National Labor Relations Act becomes law.
- July 16 – The world's first parking meters are installed in Oklahoma City.
- July 24 – The Dust Bowl heat wave reaches its peak, sending temperatures in Chicago to a record-high 109 °F (43 °C)
- July 27 – Federal Writers' Project is established.
- August 2 – The USS Philadelphia (1776) is raised from Lake Champlain.
- August 5 – The Leo Burnett Advertising Agency opens in Chicago, Illinois.
- August 14 – U.S. President Franklin D. Roosevelt signs the Social Security Act into law.
- August 15 – Humorist Will Rogers and aviator Wiley Post are killed when Post's plane crashes shortly after takeoff near Barrow, Alaska.
- August 31 – As part of United States non-interventionism in the face of growing tensions in Europe, the first of the Neutrality Acts of 1930s is passed.
- September 2 – Labor Day Hurricane of 1935: The strongest hurricane ever to strike the United States makes landfall in the Upper Florida Keys killing 423. It is rated as a Category 5 storm with 185 mph winds.
- September 8
  - Carl Weiss fatally wounds Huey Long, U.S. Senator from Louisiana ("The Kingfish"), in a shooting at the Louisiana Capitol Building in Baton Rouge.
  - Busby Berkeley is involved in three-car accident which kills three people and injures five, leading to charges of second-degree murder.
- September 23 – The Cleveland Torso Murderer begins a 3-year series of killings and beheadings around the Kingsbury Run district of Cleveland, Ohio; the perpetrator is never identified.
- September 24 – Earl W. Bascom and his brother Weldon produce the first night rodeo held outdoors under electric lights at Columbia, Mississippi.
- September 30 – U.S. President Franklin D. Roosevelt dedicates the Hoover Dam.

=== October–December ===
- October 7 - The Detroit Tigers defeat the Chicago Cubs, 4 games to 2, to win their first World Series Title.
- October 18 – The 6.5 M_{s} Helena earthquake affected the capital of Montana with a maximum Mercalli intensity of VIII (Severe), causing widespread damage and two deaths. A high intensity aftershock claimed an additional two lives on October 31.
- November 8 – A dozen labor union leaders come together to announce the creation of the Congress of Industrial Organizations (CIO), an organization charged with promoting the cause of industrial unionism in North America.
- November 15
  - Historical Records Survey begins under the Works Progress Administration.
  - The then U.S. colony of the Philippines (now independent) becomes a Commonwealth with Manuel Quezon as its president.
- November 22 – The China Clipper takes off from Alameda, California to deliver the first airmail cargo across the Pacific Ocean; the aircraft reaches its destination, Manila, and delivers over 110,000 pieces of mail.
- November 30 – The British-made film Scrooge, the first all-talking film version of Charles Dickens' classic A Christmas Carol, opens in the U.S. after its British release. Seymour Hicks plays Scrooge, a role he has played onstage hundreds of times. The film is criticized by some for not showing all of the ghosts physically, and quickly fades into obscurity. Widespread interest does not surface until the film is shown on television in the 1980s, in very shabby-looking prints. It is eventually restored on DVD.
- December 5 – Mary McLeod Bethune founds the National Council of Negro Women.
- December 9 – Newspaper editor Walter Liggett is killed in a gangland murder plot in Minneapolis.
- December 17 – Douglas DST, prototype of the Douglas DC-3 airliner, first flies. More than 16,000 of the model will eventually be produced.
- December 26 – Shenandoah National Park is established in Virginia.

=== Undated ===
- The house Fallingwater in southwestern Pennsylvania, designed by Frank Lloyd Wright, is completed.
- 4 million members of trade unions in the U.S.
- American Institute of Public Opinion, as predecessor of Gallup Group, a management consulting and worldwide research management institution business, founded in New Jersey, United States.

=== Ongoing ===
- Lochner era (c. 1897–c. 1937)
- Dust Bowl (1930–1936)
- New Deal (1933–1938)
- Great Depression (1929–1939)

== Births ==
=== January ===
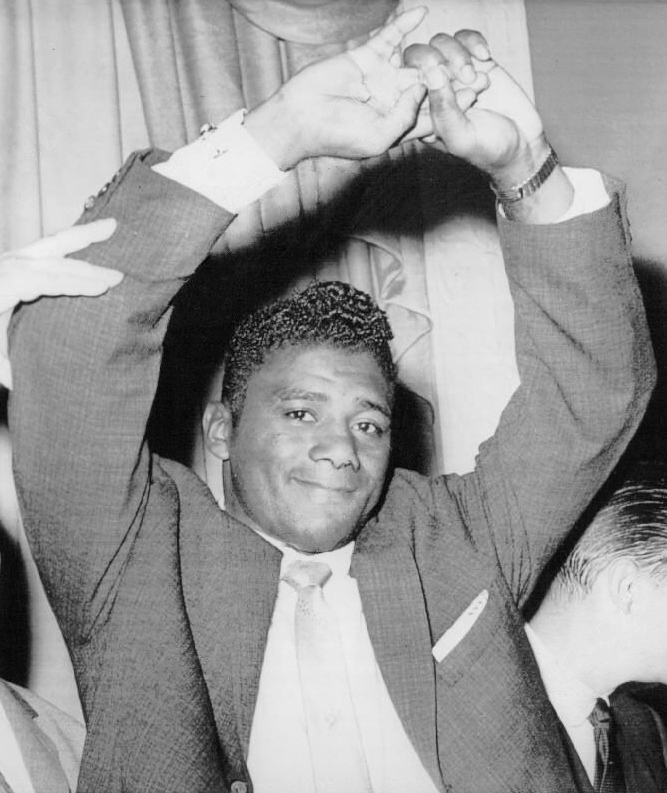
Floyd Patterson

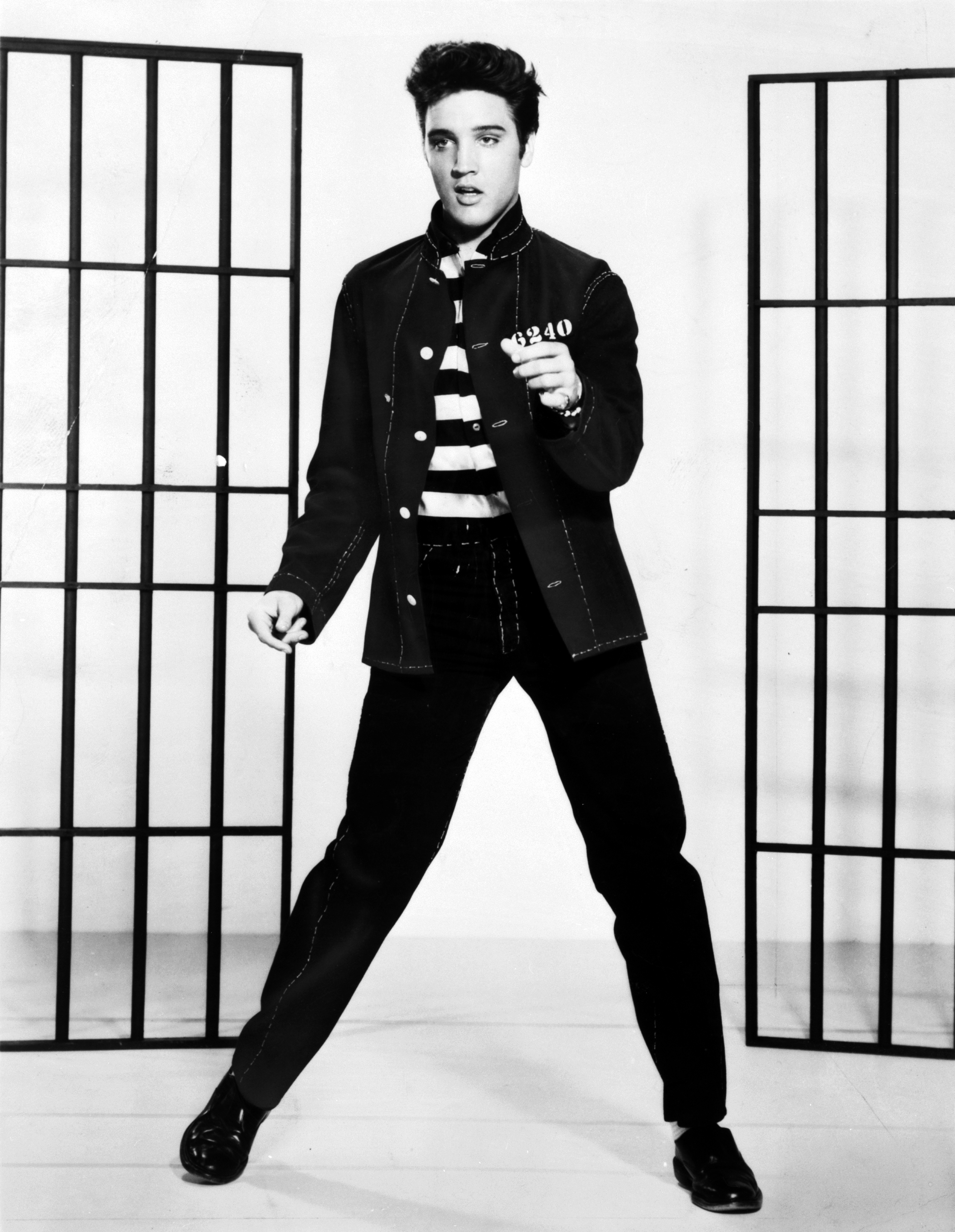
Elvis Presley

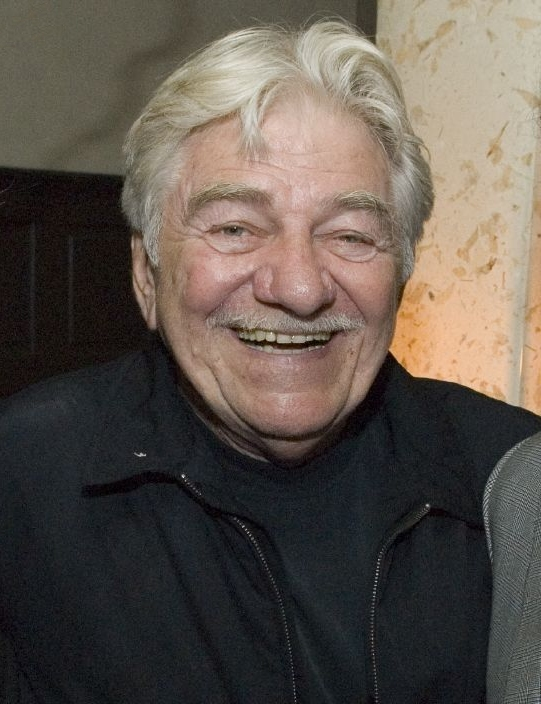
Seymour Cassel

- January 2 – Jack Lemley, American architect (d. 2021)
- January 3 – Millard Fuller, American lawyer, founder of Habitat for Humanity (d. 2009)
- January 4 – Floyd Patterson, African-American heavyweight boxer (d. 2006)
- January 5 – Chuck Flores, American drummer (d. 2016)
- January 6
  - Gerald R. Molen, American actor and producer
  - Nino Tempo, American singer (d. 2025)
- January 7
  - Kenny Davern, American jazz clarinetist (d. 2006)
  - Ducky Schofield, baseball player (d. 2022)
- January 8 – Elvis Presley, American rock & roll singer, guitarist and film actor (d. 1977)
- January 9
  - Bob Denver, American actor (d. 2005)
  - Dick Enberg, American sportscaster (d. 2017)
  - Earl G. Graves Sr., African-American publisher (d. 2020)
- January 10
  - Eddy Clearwater, African-American musician (d. 2018)
  - Ronnie Hawkins, American rockabilly musician (d. 2022)
  - Sherrill Milnes, American baritone
- January 11 – Walter Mears, journalist and author (d. 2022)
- January 12 – The Amazing Kreskin, mentalist (d. 2024)
- January 13 – Rip Taylor, American actor and comedian (d. 2019)
- January 16
  - Joyce Crouch, American politician (b. 2018).
  - Russ McCubbin, American actor (d. 2018)
  - A. J. Foyt, American race car driver
- January 17 – Ruth Ann Minner, American politician (d. 2021)
- January 20
  - Dorothy Provine, American singer, dancer, actress and comedian (d. 2010)
  - Joan Weston, American roller derby racer (d. 1997)
- January 21 – Raye Montague, American naval engineer (d. 2018)
- January 22
  - Seymour Cassel, American actor (d. 2019)
  - Pete du Pont, American attorney, businessman, and politician, 68th governor of Delaware (d. 2021)
- January 25
  - Conrad Burns, American politician (d. 2016)
  - Steve Demeter, American baseball player, coach and manager (d. 2013)
  - Don Maynard, American football player (d. 2022)
  - Richard M. Pollack, American mathematician (d. 2018)
- January 26
  - Henry Jordan, American football player (d. 1977)
  - Andrew J. Stofan, American astronautical engineer (d. 2025)
- January 29 – Roger Payne, American zoologist (d. 2023)
- January 30 – Richard Brautigan, American writer (d. 1984)
- January 31 – Hal Lear, American basketball player (d. 2016)

=== February ===
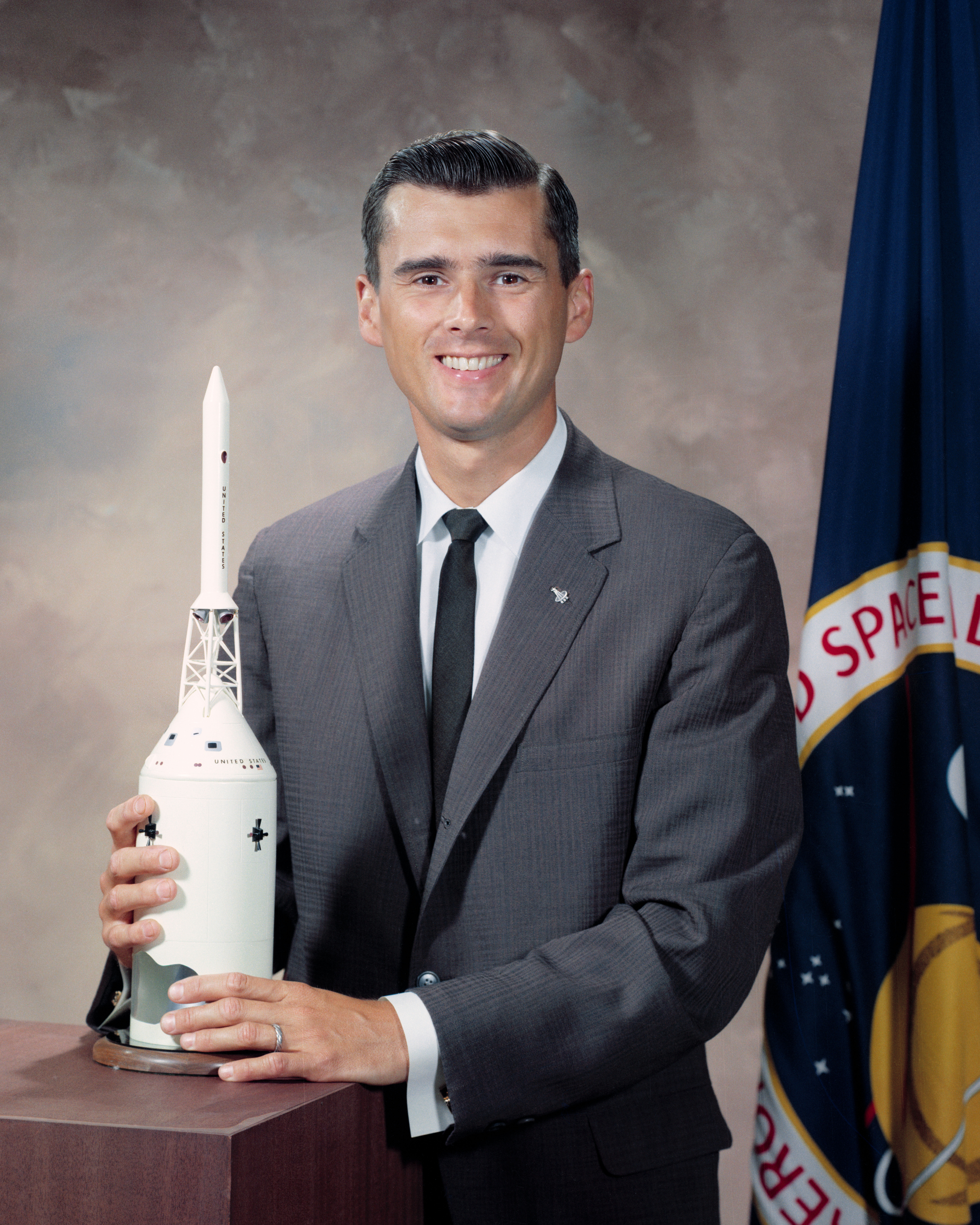
Roger B. Chaffee

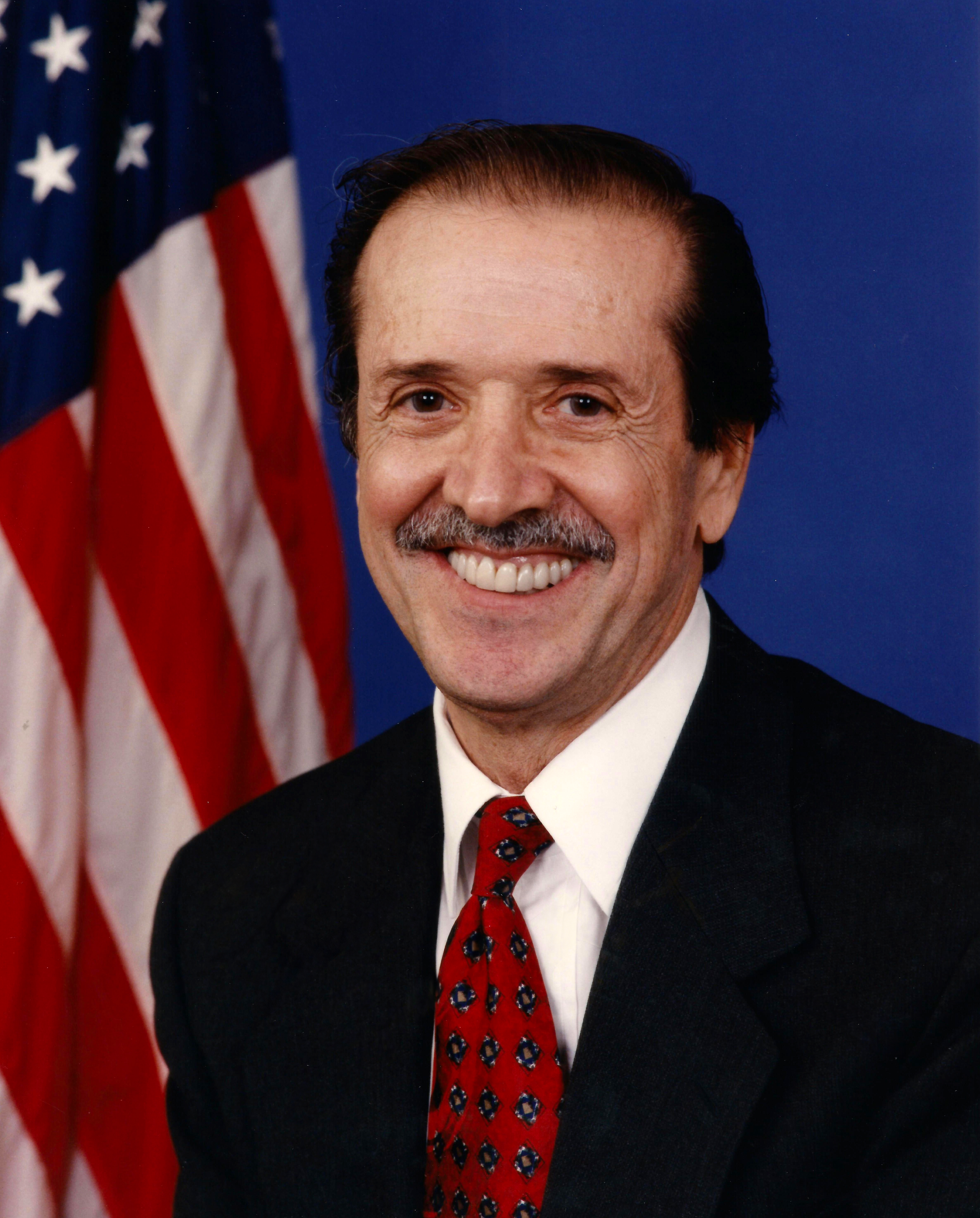
Sonny Bono

- February 2 – Raven Wilkinson, American dancer (d. 2018)
- February 3
  - Johnny "Guitar" Watson, African-American singer, songwriter and musician (d. 1996)
  - Jody Williams, African-American blues musician (d. 2018)
- February 4
  - Fred Kirschenmann, American agriculturist (d. 2025)
  - Collin Wilcox, American actress (d. 2009)
- February 5 – Colin Robert Chase, academic (d. 1984)
- February 7 – Herb Kohl, American politician (d. 2023)
- February 10
  - John Alcorn, American illustrator (d. 1992)
  - Eddie Foy III, American actor, film director (d. 2018)
- February 11 – Gene Vincent, American guitarist, vocalist (d. 1971)
- February 12 – Gene McDaniels, African-American singer, songwriter (d. 2011)
- February 13
  - Carol Jarecki, American chess organizer and writer (d. 2021)
  - Jacob Tanzer, American attorney (d. 2018)
- February 14 – Arnold Kopelson, American film producer (d. 2018)
- February 15 – Roger B. Chaffee, American astronaut (d. 1967)
- February 16 – Sonny Bono, American singer, actor and politician (d. 1998)
- February 17
  - Johnny Bush, American country music singer, songwriter and drummer (d. 2020)
  - Sara Ruddick, American feminist philosopher (d. 2011)
  - Ruth Seymour, American broadcasting executive (d. 2023)
  - Lucky Varela, American politician (d. 2017)
- February 25
  - Tony Campolo, American sociologist and Baptist pastor (d. 2024)
  - Sally Jessy Raphael, American talk show host

=== March ===
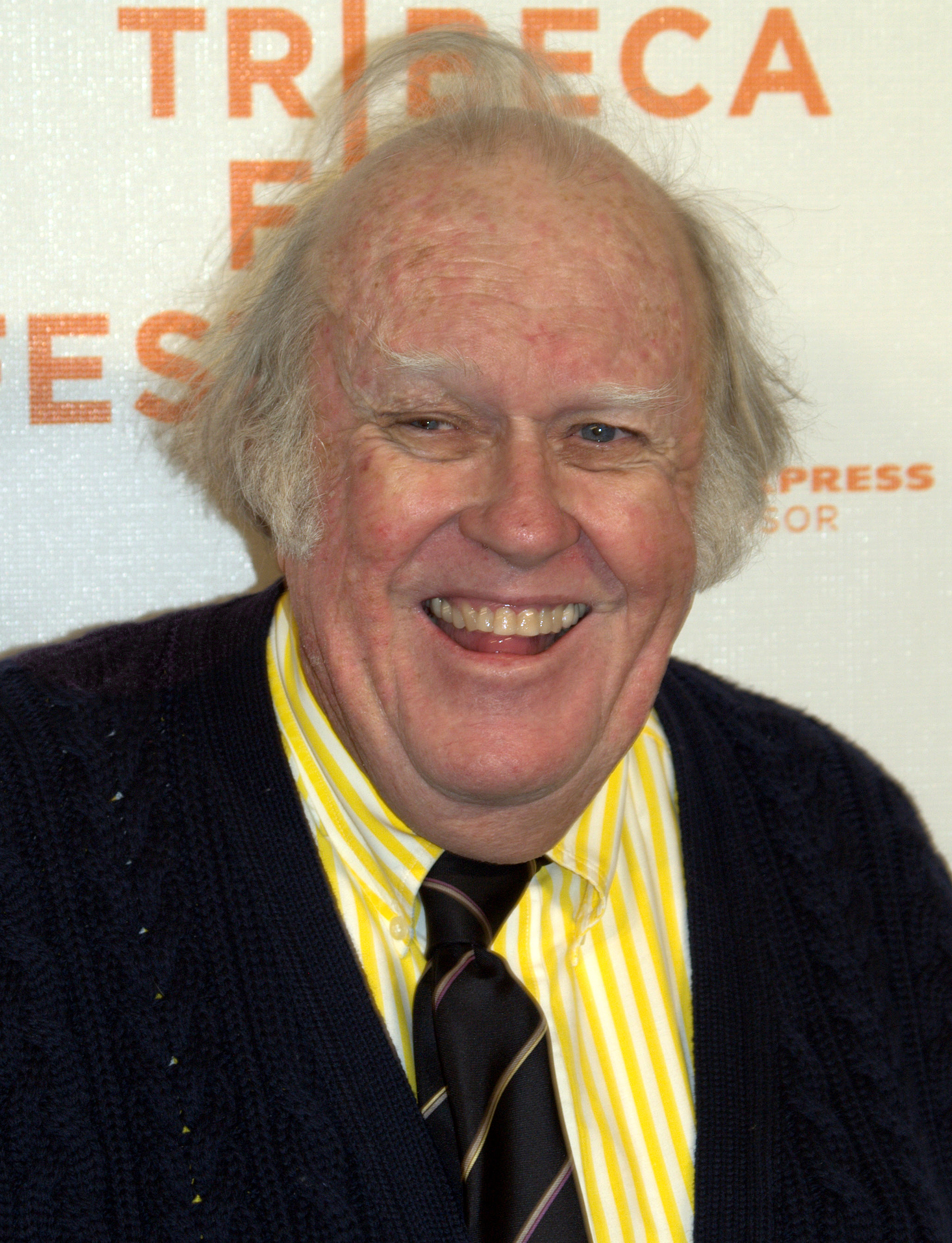
M. Emmet Walsh

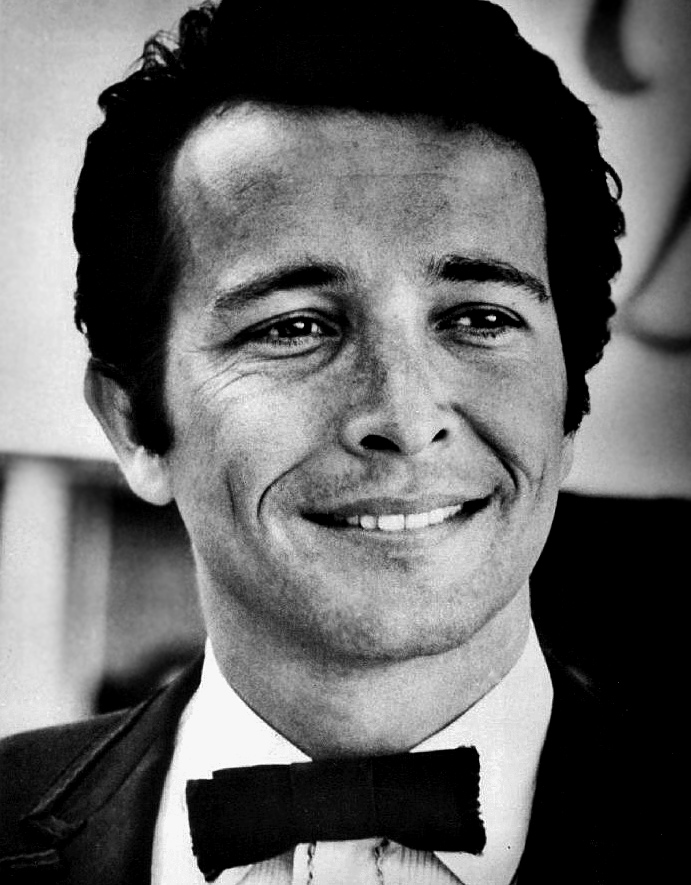
Herb Alpert

- March 1 – Robert Conrad, American actor (The Wild Wild West) (d. 2020)
- March 6 – Ralph Natale, American mobster (d. 2022)
- March 11 – Nancy Kovack, American actress
- March 13 – Leon Burton, American football player (d. 2022)
- March 15
  - Jimmy Swaggart, American televangelist
  - Judd Hirsch, American actor (Taxi)
- March 17 – Bonnie Cooper, American baseball player (d. 2018)
- March 19 – Charlie Hennigan, American football player (d. 2017)
- March 22 – M. Emmet Walsh, American actor (d. 2024)
- March 23 – Edgar S. Cahn, American law professor and author (d. 2022)
- March 24 – Walter Moody, American murderer (d. 2018)
- March 25 – Jim Miceli, American politician (d. 2018)
- March 27 – Stanley Rother, American Roman Catholic priest (d. 1981)
- March 28 – Jeanie Descombes, American professional baseball player
- March 30
  - Willie Galimore, American football player (d. 1964)
  - J. Willard Thompson, American racehorse trainer (d. 2018)
- March 31
  - Herb Alpert, American trumpeter
  - Judith Rossner, American novelist (d. 2005)

=== April ===
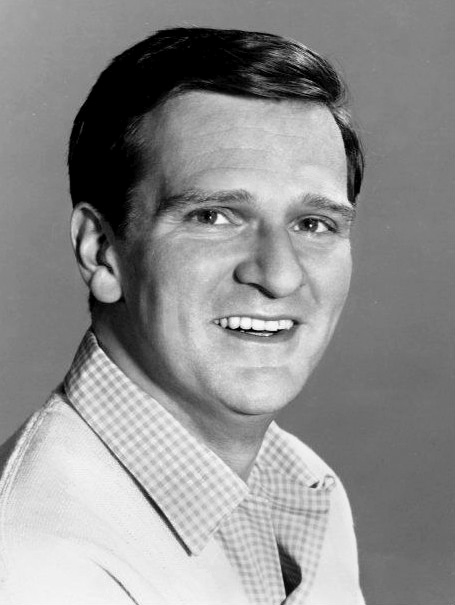
Kenneth Mars

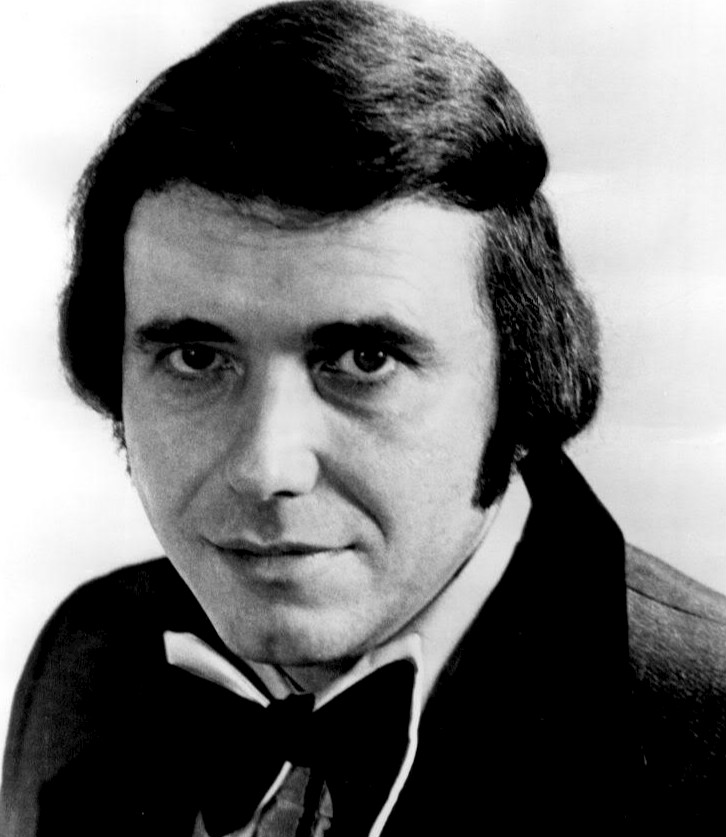
Bobby Bare

- April 3 – Harold Kushner, American rabbi and author (d. 2023)
- April 4 – Kenneth Mars, American actor (d. 2011)
- April 7
  - Bobby Bare, American country singer, songwriter
  - Hodding Carter III, American journalist and politician (d. 2023)
- April 8
  - David DiChiera, American composer (d. 2018)
  - Francis D. Moran, American admiral, director of the National Oceanic and Atmospheric Administration Commissioned Officer Corps
- April 10 – Ken Squier, American motorsports broadcaster (d. 2023)
- April 11 – Nelson W. Aldrich Jr., author and editor (d. 2022)
- April 13 – Lyle Waggoner, American actor (d. 2020)
- April 14 – Katie Horstman, American female professional baseball player
- April 15 – Charles Fried, American lawyer (d. 2024)
- April 17 – Walt Kowalczyk, American football player (d. 2018)
- April 18
  - Joanne Brekke, American politician (d. 2017)
  - Paul A. Rothchild, American record producer (d. 1995)
- April 21
  - Charles Grodin, American actor, comedian, author and cable talk show host (d. 2021)
  - Thomas Kean, Governor of New Jersey, 9/11 Commission Chairman
  - Dolores Lee, American female professional baseball player (d. 2014)
- April 22
  - Paul Chambers, American jazz musician (d. 1969)
  - Jerry Fodor, American philosopher, cognitive scientist (d. 2017)
- April 23
  - Bunky Green, American jazz musician (d. 2025)
  - Charles Silverstein, American writer and LGBT activist (d. 2023)
- April 25 – Bob Gutowski, American athlete (d. 1960)

=== May ===
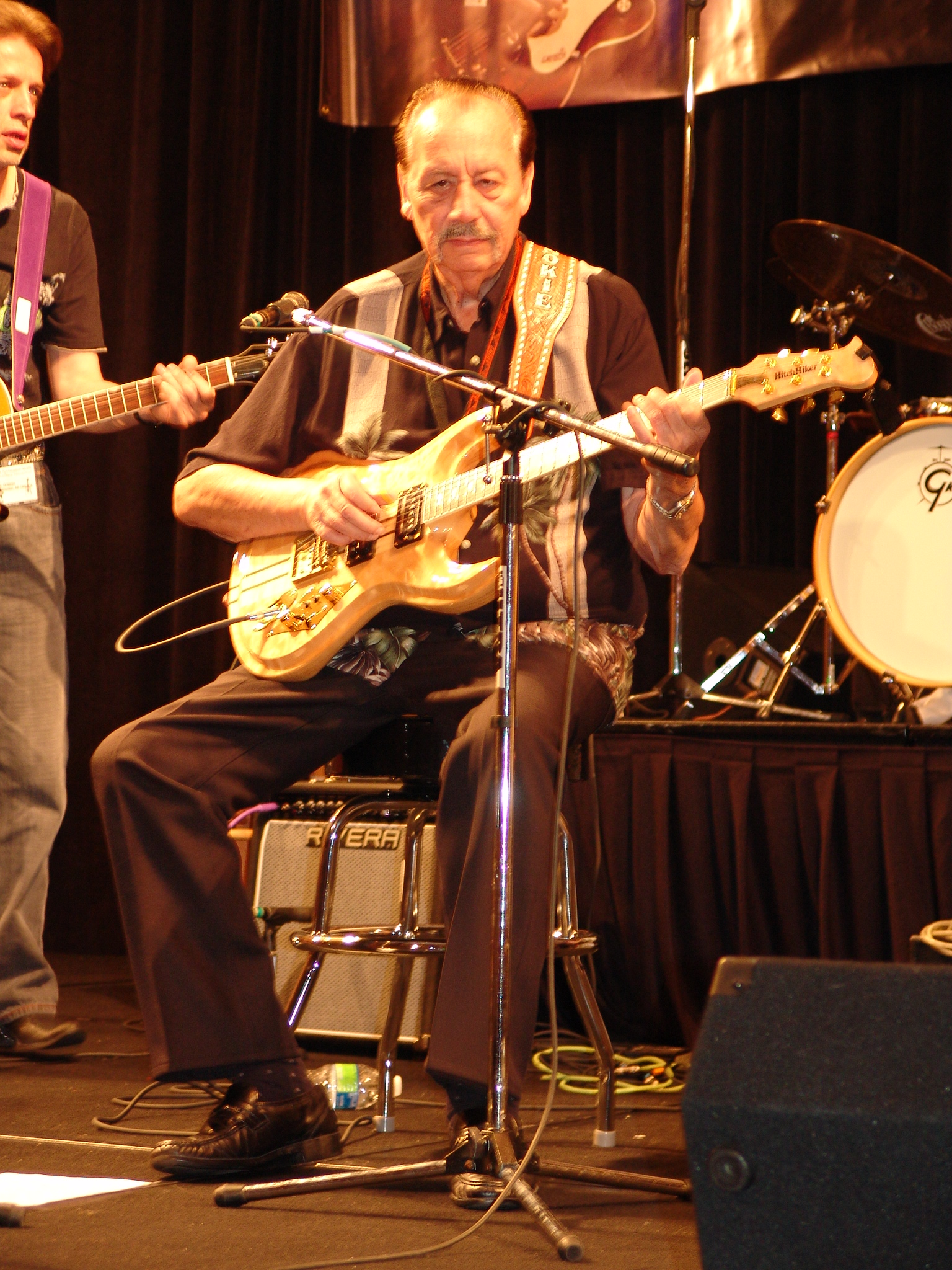
Nokie Edwards

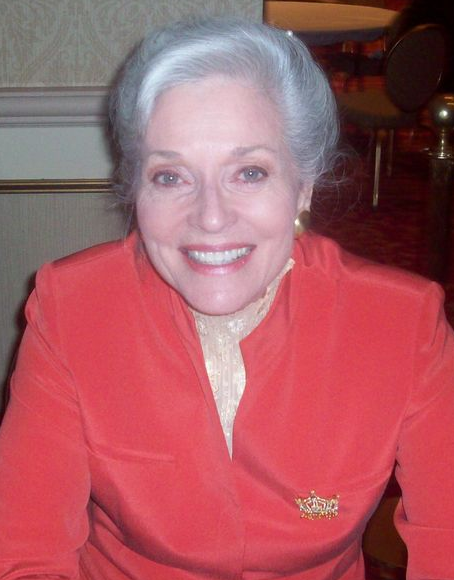
Lee Meriwether

- May 2 – Lance LeGault, American actor (d. 2012)
- May 3 – Ron Popeil, American inventor and marketing personality (d. 2021)
- May 4 – Reginald Green, American development economist (d. 2021)
- May 6 – Edward M. Abroms, American film editor (d. 2018)
- May 7 – Hank Stackpole, American military officer (d. 2020)
- May 9 - Nokie Edwards, American musician (d. 2018)
- May 11
  - Doug McClure, American actor (d. 1995)
  - Dick Leitsch, American LGBT rights activist (d. 2018)
- May 12
  - Hoss Ellington, American race car driver (d. 2014)
  - Gary Peacock, American bassist and composer (d. 2020)
- May 15 – Don Bragg, American athlete (d. 2019])
- May 19 – David Hartman, American actor, television journalist
- May 21 – Johnny Majors, American football player and coach (d. 2020)
- May 22 – Barry Rogers, American jazz, salsa trombonist (d. 1991)
- May 24
  - Paul A. David, American economist (d. 2023)
  - Joan Micklin Silver, American director (d. 2020)
  - Rusty York, American singer (d. 2014)
- May 25
  - Cookie Gilchrist, American football player (d. 2011)
  - Victoria Shaw, American actress (d. 1988)
- May 26 – Susann McDonald, American harpist (d. 2025)
- May 27
  - Jerry Kindall, American baseball player (d. 2017)
  - Ramsey Lewis, American jazz pianist and composer (d. 2022)
  - Lee Meriwether, American actress
- May 28 – Charles J. Hynes, American lawyer and politician (d. 2019)
- May 30 – Bill Mallory, American football player, and coach (d. 2018)

=== June ===
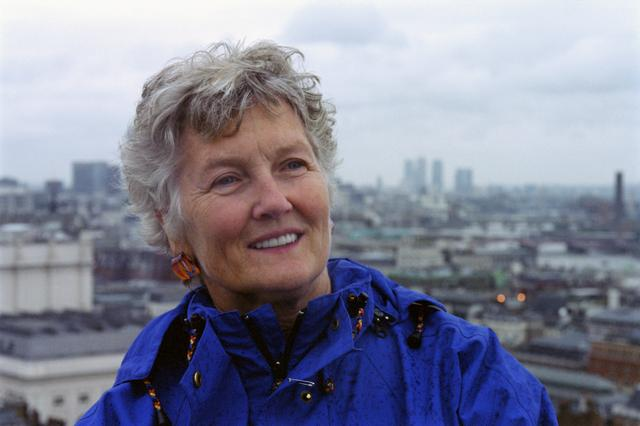
Peggy Seeger

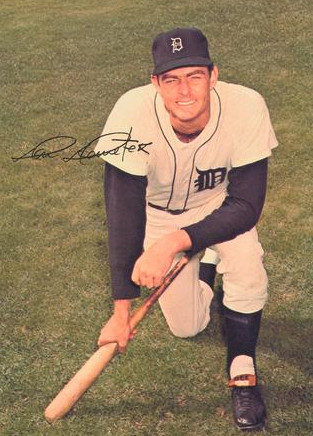
Don Demeter

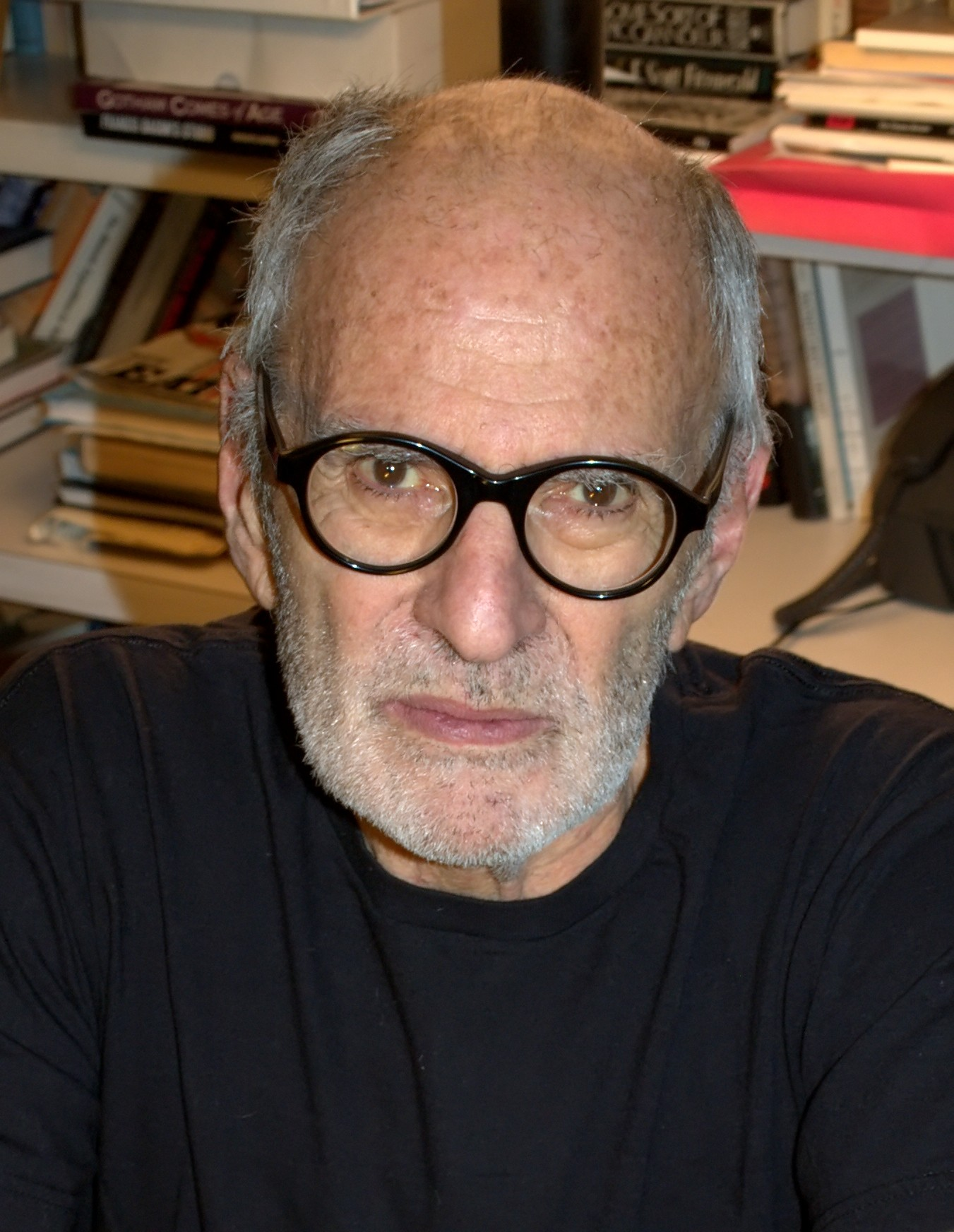
Larry Kramer

- June 1 – Reverend Ike (Frederick J. Eikerenkoetter II), African-American televangelist (d. 2009)
- June 2
  - Darrel Aschbacher, American football player (d. 2023)
  - Carol Shields, American-born writer (d. 2003 in Canada)
- June 6 – Miriam T. Griffin, American classical scholar (d. 2018 in the United Kingdom)
- June 7 – Harry Crews, American novelist, short story writer and essayist (d. 2012)
- June 16 – John Leo, American writer and journalist (d. 2022)
- June 17
  - Peggy Seeger, American folk singer
  - Rudolph G. Wilson, American professor, storyteller, writer and public speaker (d. 2017)
- June 20
  - Jim Barker, American politician (d. 2005)
  - Len Dawson, American football player (d. 2022)
- June 21
  - John Abbey, American actor (d. 2010)
  - Monte Markham, American actor
  - Tom Pratt, American football coach
- June 22
  - Donald A. Bonner, American politician (d. 2021)
  - Floyd Norman, American animator
- June 23 – Maurice Ferré, American politician (d. 2019)
- June 24
  - Charlie Dees, American professional baseball player
  - Robert Downey Sr., American actor, filmmaker and father of actor Robert Downey Jr. ( d. 2021)
  - Pete Hamill, American journalist, novelist, essayist, editor and educator (d. 2020)
  - Ron Kramer, National Football League tight end (d. 2010)
  - Terry Riley, American minimalist composer
- June 25
  - Don Demeter, American outfielder, third baseman and first baseman in Major League Baseball (d. 2021)
  - Judy Howe, American artistic gymnast
  - Larry Kramer, American playwright, author, public health advocate and LGBT rights activist (d. 2020)
  - Fran Ross, African American satirist (d. 1985)
- June 26 – Pete Peterson, American politician and diplomat
- June 27
  - Dan Currie, American football player (d. 2017)
  - Larry Krutko, American football player
- June 28 – Bob Blaylock, American professional baseball player (d. 2024)
- June 30 – Stanley Norman Cohen, American geneticist

=== July ===
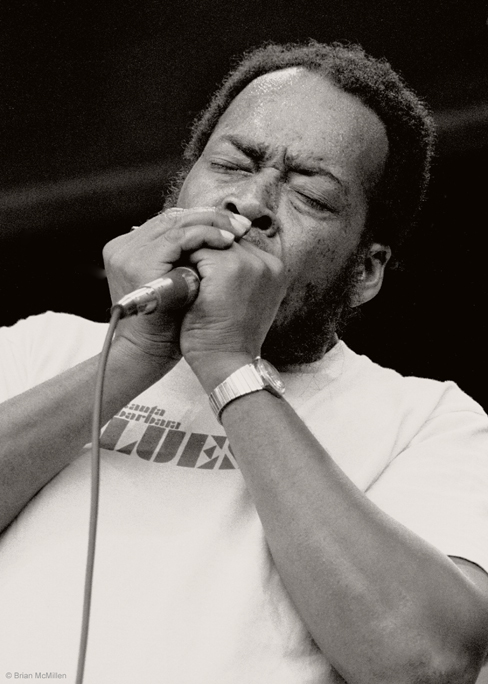
James Cotton

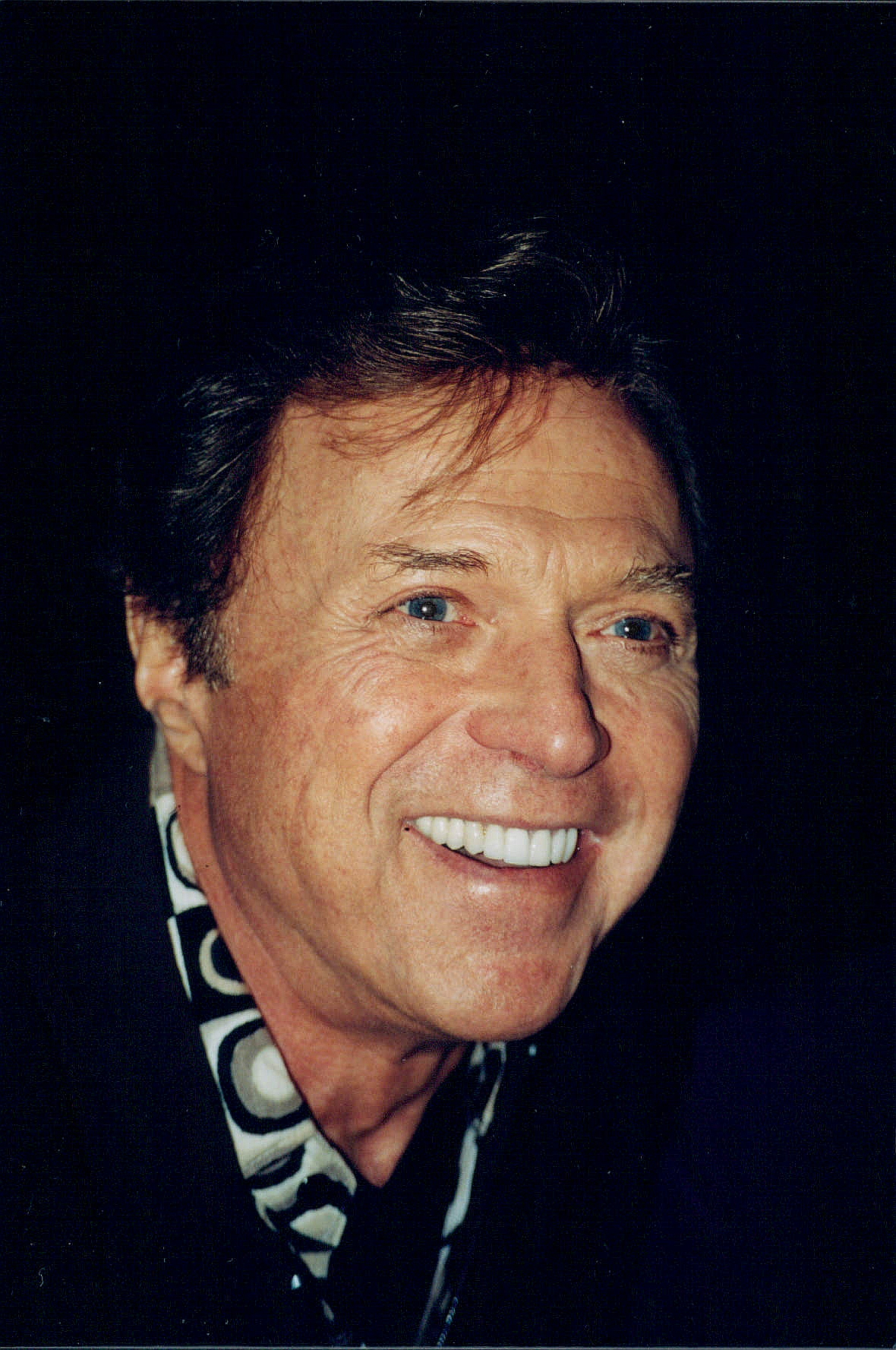
Steve Lawrence

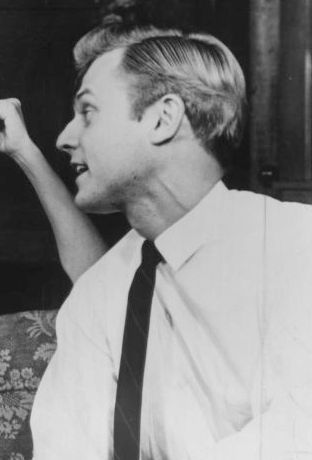
Ken Kercheval

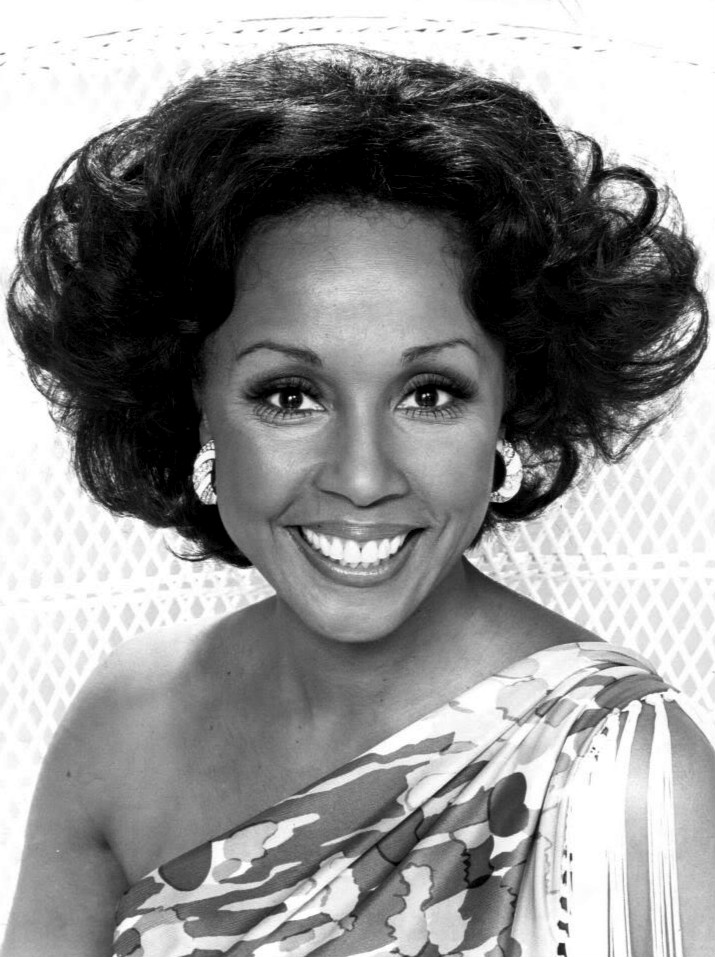
Diahann Carroll

- July 1
  - Neal Brooks Biggers Jr., American judge (d. 2023)
  - James Cotton, American blues harmonica player, singer, songwriter (d. 2017)
- July 2 – Ed Bullins, American playwright (d. 2021)
- July 3
  - Al Primo, American television executive (d. 2022)
  - Harrison Schmitt, American astronaut and politician
- July 4
  - Erich Barnes, American football defensive back (d. 2022)
  - Roy Wilt, American politician
- July 5
  - Brendan McCann, American basketball player (d. 2024)
  - Van Poole, American politician
- July 8 – Steve Lawrence, American singer, actor (d. 2024)
- July 9 – Robert Pelletreau, American diplomat
- July 10 – Margaret McEntee, American Catholic religious sister, educator
- July 11 – Darrell Dess, American football offensive lineman
- July 12 – Ed Rubinoff, American tennis player
- July 13 – Jack Kemp, American football player, U.S. vice presidential candidate (d. 2009)
- July 15
  - Ken Kercheval, American actor (d. 2019)
  - Andra Martin, American actress (d. 2022)
- July 16
  - Edward J. Nell, American economist
  - Gloria Tanner, American politician (d. 2022)
  - Lynn Wyatt, American socialite and philanthropist
- July 17
  - Diahann Carroll, African-American actress and singer (d. 2019)
  - Benjamin Civiletti, United States Attorney General (d. 2022)
  - Peter Schickele, American composer and classical musical parodist (d. 2024)
- July 18 – Hall Whitley, American football player
- July 19 – George Breen, American competition swimmer (d. 2019)
- July 21
  - Jeanne Arth, American Wimbledon and US Championships doubles tennis title holder
  - Larry Hayes, American football player (d. 2017)
- July 22
  - Grover Dale, American actor, dancer, choreographer and theatre director
  - Steve Junker, American football player (d. 2023)
- July 24 – Lowry Mays, American businessman (d. 2022)
- July 25
  - Barbara Harris, American actress (d. 2018)
  - Larry Sherry, American Major League Baseball player (d. 2006)
- July 27 – Sarah Jane Sands, American professional baseball player
- July 28 – Ernie Bowman, American professional baseball player (d. 2019)
- July 29 – Friday Hassler, American racing driver (d. 1972)
- July 30 – Nick Meglin, American magazine editor (d. 2018)
- July 31
  - Richard C. Blum, American investor (d. 2022)
  - Mort Crim, American television newscaster
  - Geoffrey Lewis, American actor (d. 2015)

=== August ===
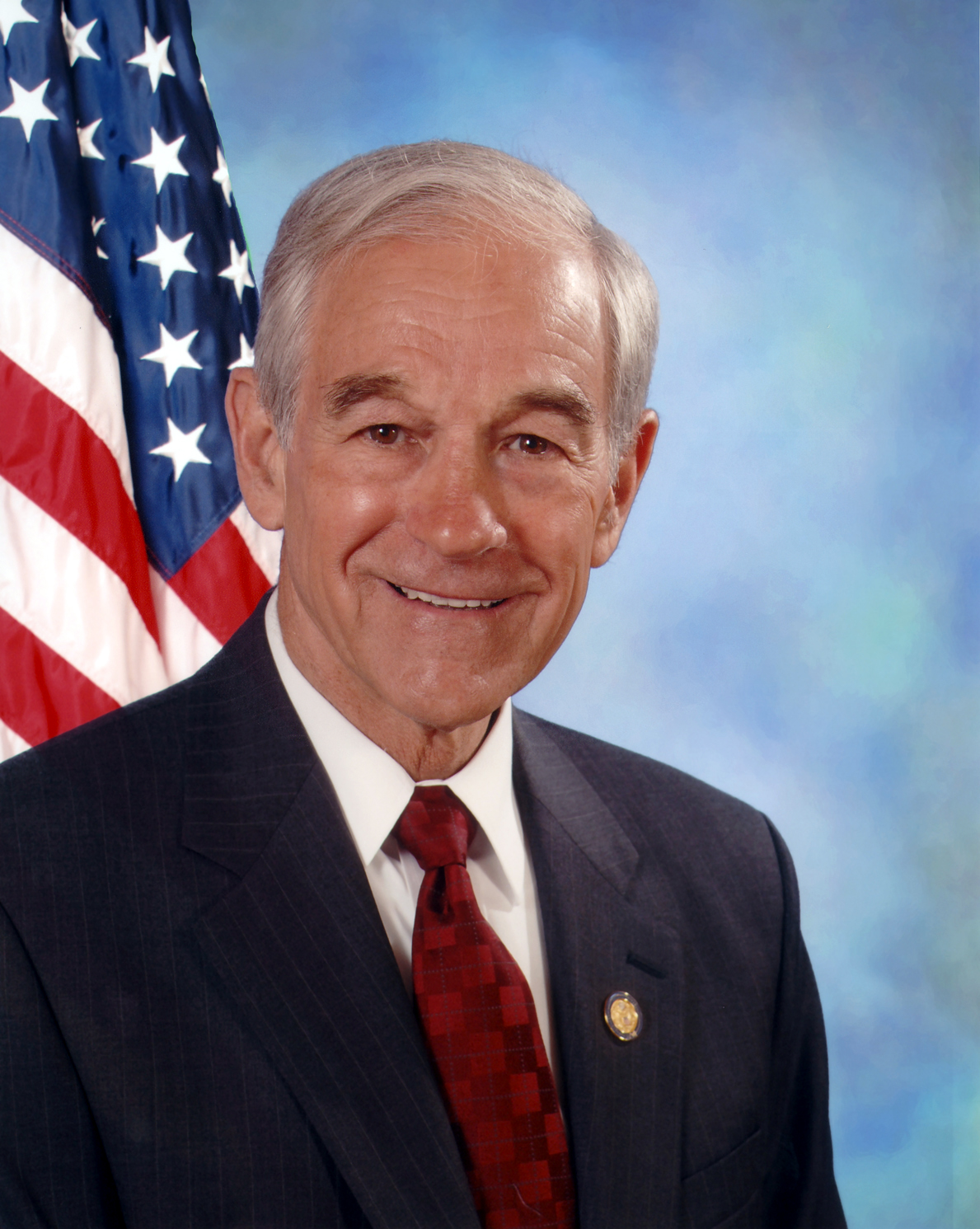
Ron Paul

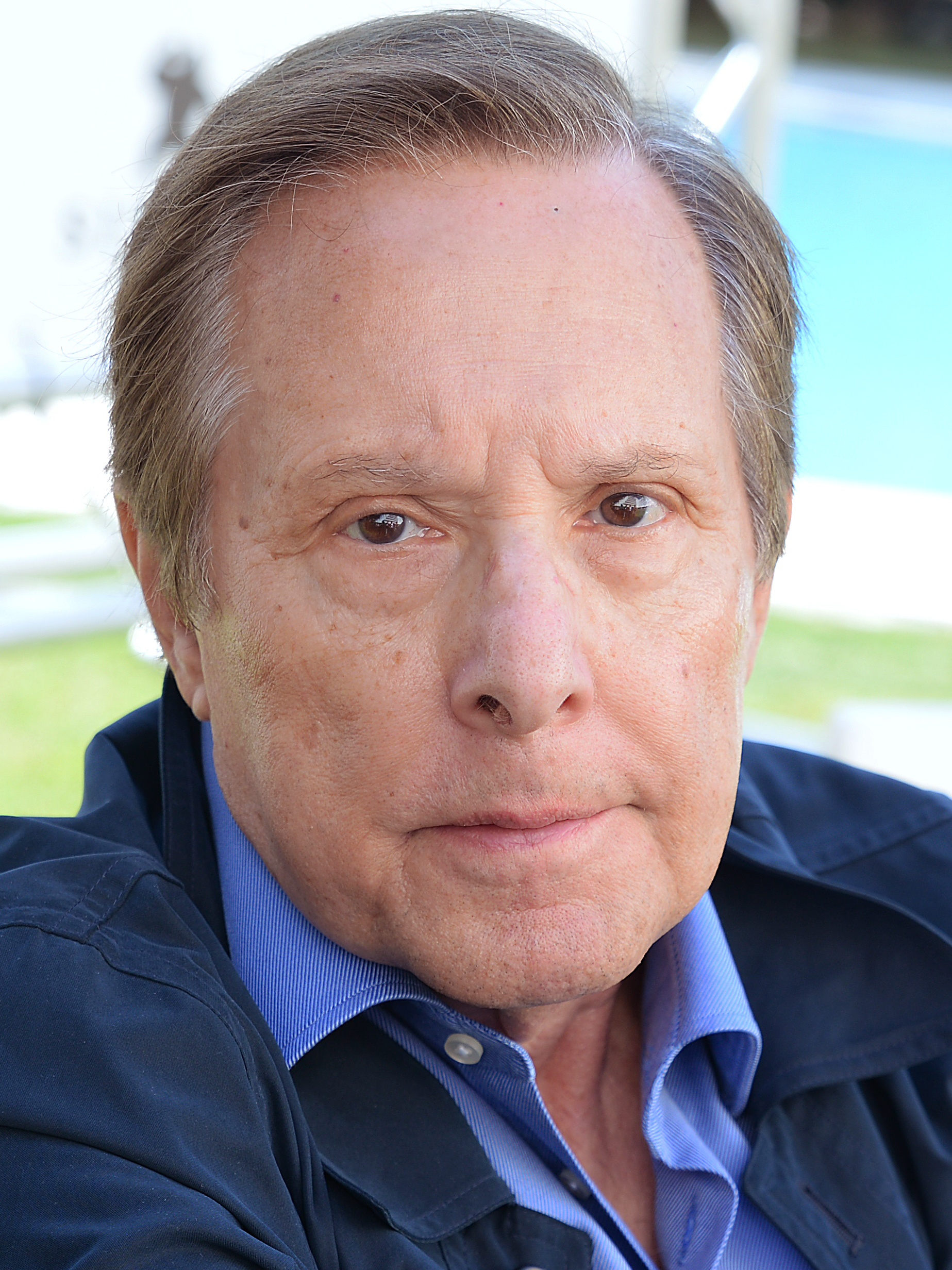
William Friedkin

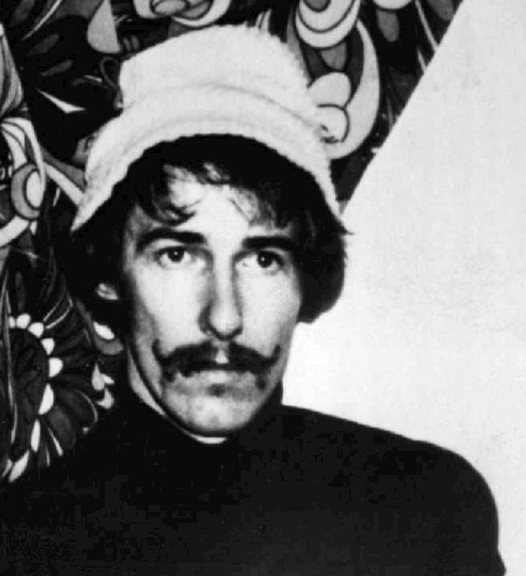
John Phillips

- August 2 – Hank Cochran, American country music singer/songwriter (d. 2010)
- August 4 – Carol Arthur, American actress (d. 2020)
- August 7
  - Ada Deer, American scholar and civil servant (d. 2023)
  - Dave Ragan, American professional golfer (d. 2018)
- August 8
  - Donald P. Bellisario, American television producer and screenwriter
  - Joe Tex, African-American soul singer (d. 1982)
- August 12 – John Cazale, American actor (d. 1978)
- August 14 – John Brodie, American football player (d. 2026)
- August 15
  - Vernon Jordan, African-American lawyer, businessman and activist (d. 2021)
  - Lionel Taylor, American football player and coach (d. 2025)
- August 16 – Charlie Tyra, American basketball player (d. 2006)
- August 18
  - Gail Fisher, African-American actress (Mannix) (d. 2000)
  - Rafer Johnson, African-American athlete (d. 2020)
- August 19 – Bobby Richardson, American baseball player
- August 20 – Ron Paul, American author, physician, and politician
- August 22 – Annie Proulx, American novelist
- August 26 – Geraldine Ferraro, American politician (d. 2011)
- August 29
  - Thomas Stephens, American football player (d. 2018)
  - William Friedkin, American film director (d. 2023)
- August 30 – John Phillips, American singer-songwriter (The Mamas & the Papas) (d. 2001)
- August 31
  - Eldridge Cleaver, African-American political activist and writer (d. 1998)
  - Frank Robinson, African-American baseball player, coach and manager (d. 2019)

=== September ===
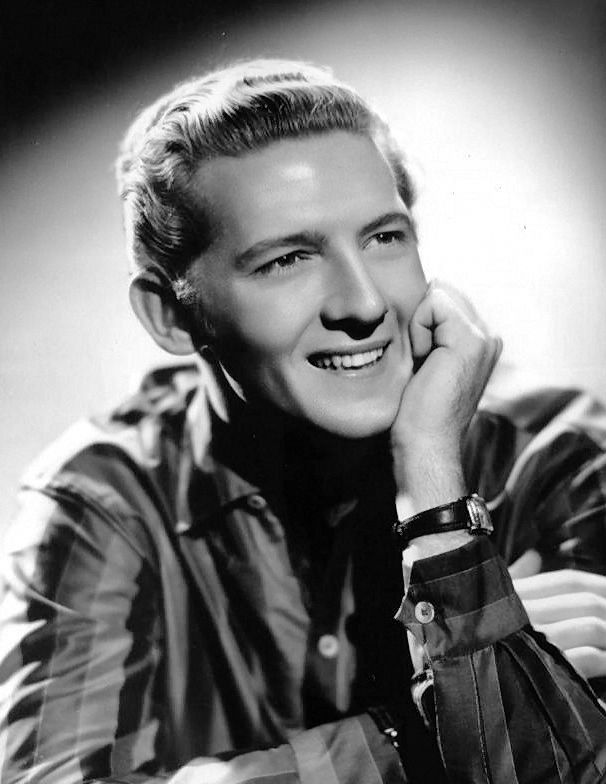
Jerry Lee Lewis

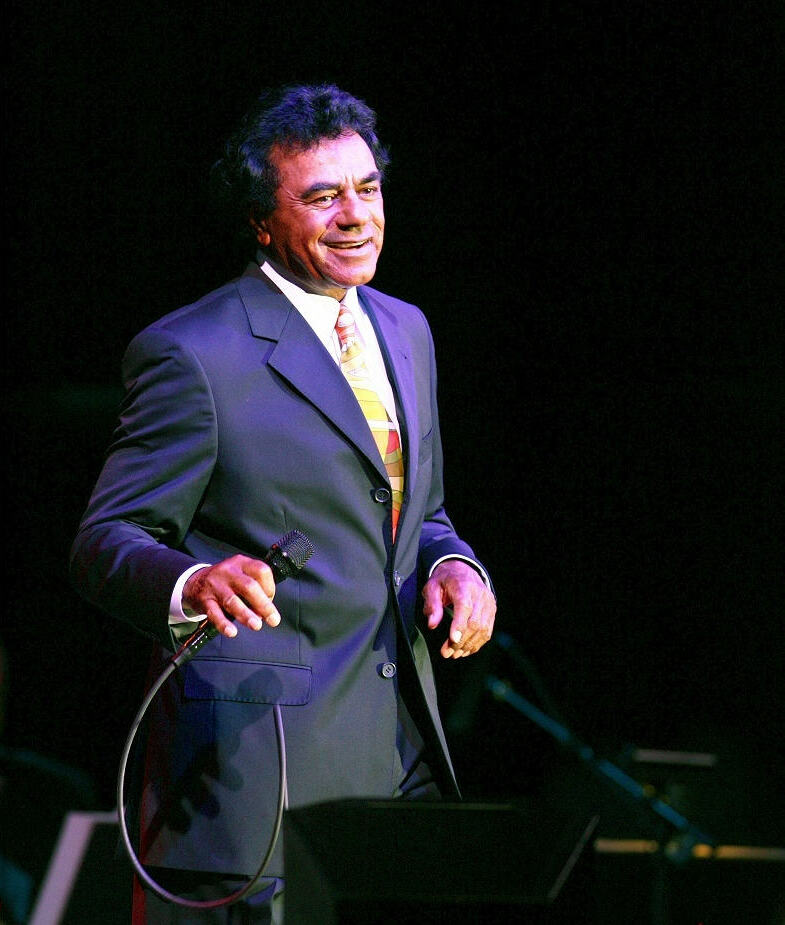
Johnny Mathis

- September 1 – Guy Rodgers, American basketball player (d. 2001)
- September 2
  - D. Wayne Lukas, American horse trainer (d. 2025)
  - Gordon Massa, American baseball player (d. 2016)
- September 8 – Teddy Mayer, American motor racing entrepreneur (d. 2009)
- September 10 – Mary Oliver, American poet, Pulitzer Prize for Poetry winner (d. 2019)
- September 12
  - Harvey J. Alter, American virologist, Nobel Prize recipient
  - Donald Fowler, American politician (d. 2020)
  - Richard Hunt, African-American sculptor (d. 2023)
  - Al Swift, American broadcaster, politician (d. 2018)
- September 15 – Bill Jackson, American television personality (d. 2022)
- September 16
  - Carl Andre, American minimalist artist (d. 2024)
  - Billy Boy Arnold, African-American blues singer and harmonica player
  - Jules Bass, American film director, producer and co-founder of Rankin/Bass Productions (d. 2022)
  - Bob Kiley, American public transit planner (d. 2016)
  - Helen Williams, American fashion model (d. 2023)
- September 17 – Ken Kesey, American author (d. 2001)
- September 19
  - Bob Krueger, American politician (d. 2022)
  - Benjamin Thurman Hacker, American admiral (d. 2003)
- September 21 – Sigrid Valdis, American actress (d. 2007)
- September 20 – Jim Taylor, American football player (d. 2018)
- September 21 – Henry Gibson, American actor and comedian (d. 2009)
- September 22 – Milton Moses Ginsberg, American film director and editor (d. 2021)
- September 23 – Les McCann, African-American jazz musician (d. 2023)
- September 27
  - Junior Rodriguez, American politician (d. 2018)
  - Dave Wickersham, American baseball pitcher (d. 2022)
- September 29
  - Thomas Lockhart, American politician (d. 2018)
  - Jerry Lee Lewis, American rock & roll musician (d. 2022)
- September 30
  - Z. Z. Hill, American blues singer (d. 1984)
  - Johnny Mathis, African-American singer

=== October ===
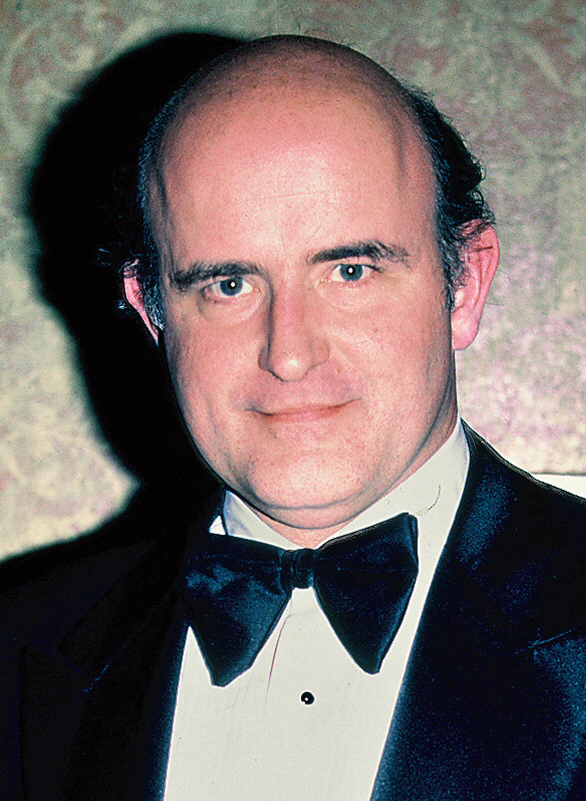
Peter Boyle

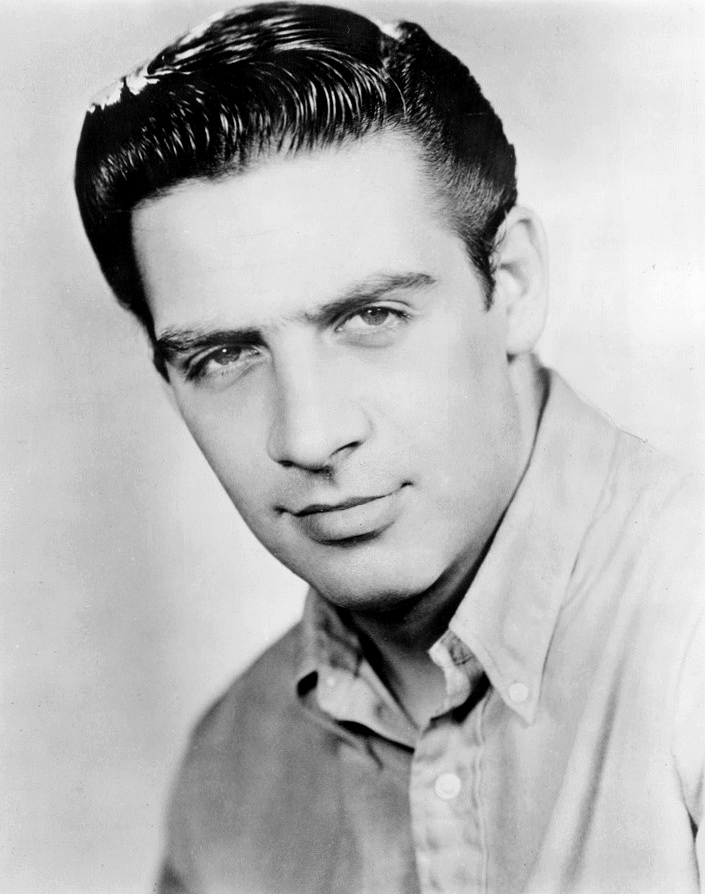
Jerry Orbach

- October 1 – Walter De Maria, American minimalist, conceptual artist and land artist (d. 2013)
- October 2 – Bernard Lee, American civil rights activist (d. 1991)
- October 3 – Charles Duke, American astronaut
- October 4 – Jimmy Orr, American professional football player (d. 2020)
- October 5 – Peter Brown, American actor (d. 2016)
- October 10 – W. Jason Morgan, geophysicist (d. 2023)
- October 11 – Daniel Quinn, American writer (d. 2018)
- October 12 – Laurence Silberman, American lawyer and public official (d. 2022)
- October 14 – La Monte Young, American composer
- October 15
  - Barry McGuire, American musician (Eve of Destruction)
  - Bobby Morrow, American athlete (d. 2020)
- October 18 – Peter Boyle, American actor (d. 2006)
- October 20 – Jerry Orbach, American actor (d. 2004)
- October 23 – JacSue Kehoe, American neuroscientist (d. 2019)
- October 25 – Rusty Schweickart, American astronaut
- October 26
  - Gloria Conyers Hewitt, African-American mathematician
  - Ora Mendelsohn Rosen, American biomedical researcher (d. 1990)
- October 28 – Bob Veale, American baseball player and coach (d. 2025)
- October 30 – Robert Caro, American biographer
- October 31 – Ronald Graham, American mathematician (d. 2020)

=== November ===
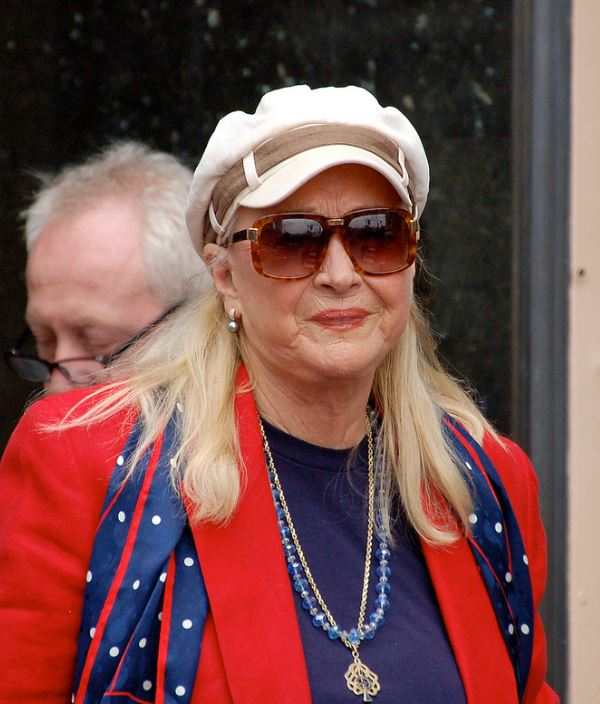
Diane Ladd

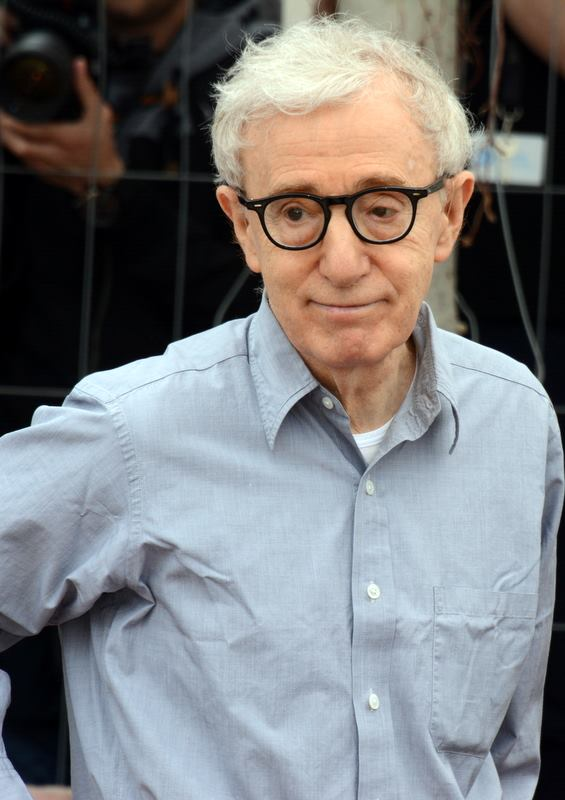
Woody Allen

- November 1 – Charles Koch, American businessman, political donor and philanthropist
- November 5 – Frank DeCicco, American mobster (d. 1986)
- November 9
  - Jerry Hopkins, American journalist, author (d. 2018)
  - Bob Gibson, African-American baseball player (d. 2020)
- November 13 – Michael Getler, American journalist (d. 2018)
- November 15 – Elizabeth Drew, American journalist and author
- November 19 – Jack Welch, American businessman (d. 2020)
- November 23 – Jean Havlish, American professional baseball, bowling player
- November 24
  - Pervis Atkins, American football player (d. 2017)
  - Ron Dellums, African-American politician (d. 2018)
- November 27 – Pat Fordice, American politician (d. 2007)
- November 29
  - Diane Ladd, American actress
  - Thomas J. O'Brien, Roman Catholic bishop, convicted of felony (d. 2018)
- November 30 – Woody Allen, American actor, comedian, and film director

=== December ===
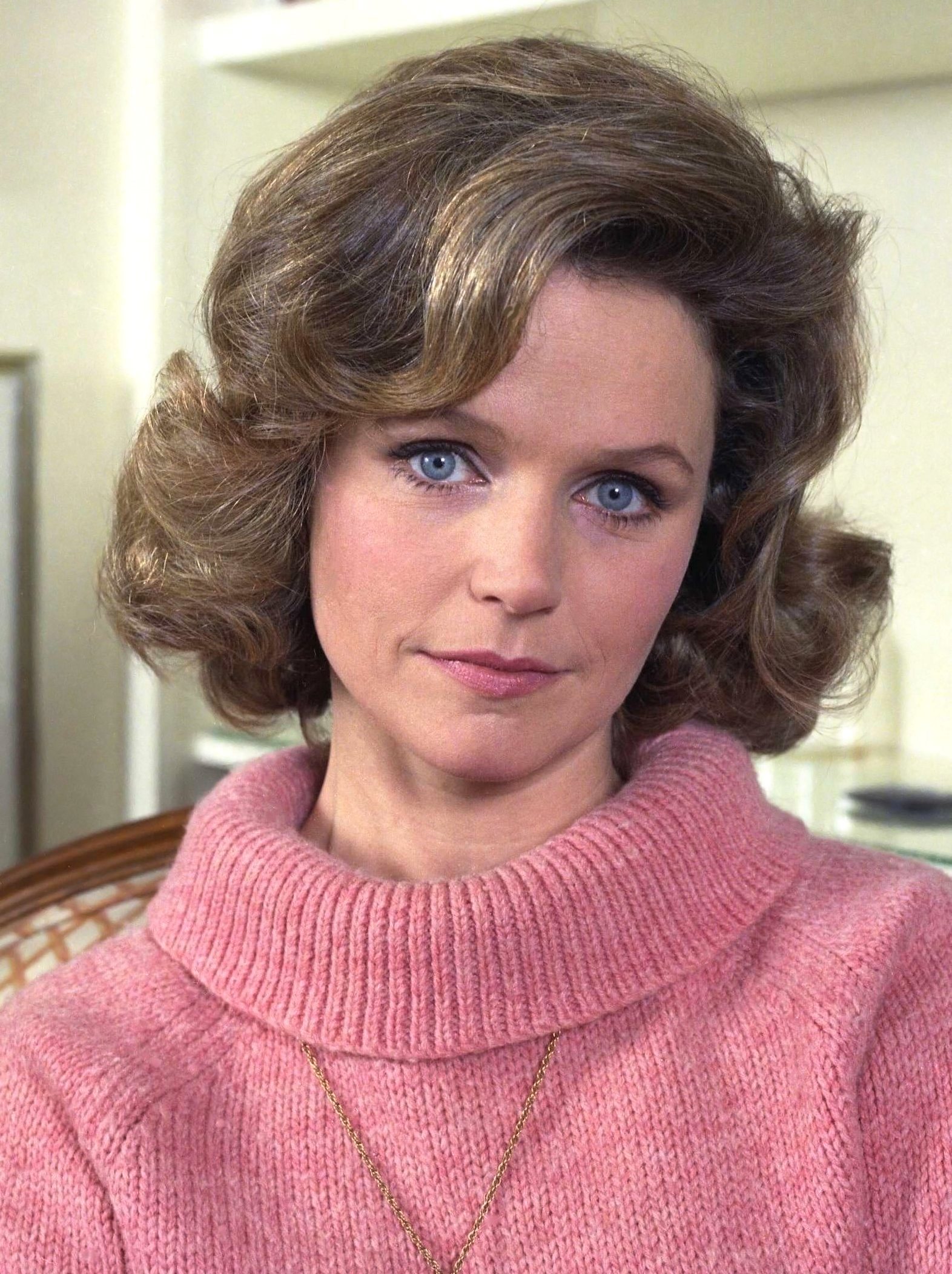
Lee Remick

- December 2 – David Hackett Fischer, American historian, author and academic
- December 4 – Paul H. O'Neill, American politician (d. 2020)
- December 5 – Calvin Trillin, American writer
- December 6 – Edward Jay Epstein, American journalist and political scientist (d. 2024)
- December 11 – Ron Carey, American actor (d. 2007)
- December 13
  - Ken Hall ("Sugar Land Express"), American football player
  - Ed Koren, American cartoonist (d. 2023)
- December 14
  - Lewis Arquette, American film actor, writer and producer (d. 2001)
  - Lee Remick, American actress (d. 1991)
- December 15 – John Taylor Gatto, American author and school teacher (d. 2018)
- December 17 – Cal Ripken, Sr., American baseball player, manager (d. 1999)
- December 19 – Bobby Timmons, American jazz pianist (d. 1974)
- December 20 – William Julius Wilson, American sociologist and academic
- December 21 – Phil Donahue, American TV personality, writer and film producer (d. 2024)
- December 23
  - Paul Hornung, American football player (d. 2020)
  - Alvin Kass, American rabbi (d. 2025)
- December 25
  - Stephen Barnett, American legal scholar (d. 2009)
  - James F. Hoge Jr., American journalist (d. 2023)
  - Anne Roiphe, American author and feminist
- December 26
  - Duke Fakir, American singer (d. 2024)
  - Al Jackson, American baseball pitcher (d. 2019)
- December 30 – Sandy Koufax, American baseball player
- December 31 – Bette Nash, American flight attendant (d. 2024)

== Deaths ==
- January 15 – Marion Howard Brazier, journalist (born 1850)
- January 16
  - Ma Barker, criminal, leader of the Barker gang (born 1873; shot)
  - Fred Barker, son of Ma Barker and a member of the Barker-Karpis gang (born 1901; shot)
- January 19 – Lloyd Hamilton, silent film comedian (born 1899)
- February 15 – Harry Todd, actor (born 1863)
- March 6 – Oliver Wendell Holmes Jr., U.S. Supreme Court Justice (born 1841)
- March 12 – Mihajlo Pupin, physicist (born 1858 in Serbia)
- March 23 – Florence Moore, vaudeville and silent film actress (born 1886)
- April 2 – Bennie Moten, jazz pianist (born 1894)
- April 6 – Edwin Arlington Robinson, poet (born 1869)
- April 8 – Adolph Ochs, newspaper publisher (born 1858)
- April 11 – Anna Katharine Green, crime fiction writer (born 1846)
- May 3 – Jessie Willcox Smith, illustrator (born 1863)
- May 4 – automobile accident
  - Junior Durkin, actor (born 1915)
  - Robert J. Horner, film producer and director (born 1894)
- May 11 – Edward Herbert Thompson, archaeologist of the Maya civilization (born 1857)
- May 13 – John S. Cohen, U.S. Senator from Georgia from 1932 to 1933 (born 1870)
- May 19 – Charles Martin Loeffler, violinist and composer (born 1861 in Germany)
- May 21 – Jane Addams, social worker, recipient of the Nobel Peace Prize (born 1860)
- July 7 – George Keller, architect (born 1842)
- July 17 – Cudjoe Lewis (Oluale Kossola), the last known surviving male victim of Clotilda, the last ship of the Atlantic slave trade (born c.1941)
- August 5 – David Townsend, art director (born 1891)
- August 14 – Harriet Mabel Spalding, litterateur and poet (born 1862)
- August 15 – aviation accident
  - Wiley Post, aviator (born 1898)
  - Will Rogers, humorist and actor (born 1879)
- August 20 – Edith Roberts, silent film actress (born 1899)
- August 25 – Mack Swain, vaudeville actor (born 1876)
- August 27 – Childe Hassam, impressionist painter (born 1859)
- September 10 – Huey Long, politician (born 1893; shot)
- September 11 – Charles Norris, medical examiner (born 1867)
- September 18 – Alice Dunbar Nelson, born Alice Moore, African-American writer and activist (born 1875)
- September 23 – DeWolf Hopper, actor and comedian (born 1858)
- October 7 – Francis Wilson, stage actor and comedian (born 1854)
- October 12 – Loretta C. Van Hook, Presbyterian missionary and educator (born 1852)
- October 18 – Gaston Lachaise, sculptor (born 1882 in France)
- October 22 – Tommy Tucker, baseball pioneer (born 1863)
- October 23
  - Charles Demuth, painter (born 1883)
  - Dutch Schultz, gangster (born 1902; shot)
- November 6
  - Henry Fairfield Osborn, paleontologist (born 1857)
  - Billy Sunday, baseball player, evangelist and prohibitionist (born 1862)
- November 8 – Mary Alice Quinn, died at the age of 14 from a chronic heart condition (born 1920)
- November 27 – Charlie Green, jazz trombonist (born c. 1895)
- December 2
  - James Henry Breasted, Egyptologist (born 1865)
  - M. Carey Thomas, educator (born 1857)
- December 9 – Walter Liggett, newspaper editor (born 1886; shot)
- December 14 – Stanley G. Weinbaum, science-fiction author (born 1902; lung cancer)
- December 16 – Thelma Todd, comedy film actress (born 1906; carbon monoxide poisoning)
- December 17 – Lizette Woodworth Reese, poet (born 1856)
- December 28 – Clarence Day, writer (born 1874)
- December 30 – Hunter Liggett, general (born 1857)

=== Date unknown ===
- Lillian Resler Keister Harford, church organizer, editor (b. 1851)

== See also ==
- List of American films of 1935
- Timeline of United States history (1930–1949)
