= Maine accent =

English pronunciation of Maine, US

A Maine accent is any of the local traditional accents of Eastern New England English spoken in parts of Maine, especially along the "Down East" and "Midcoast" seaside regions. It is characterized by a variety of features distinct from General American English, particularly among older speakers, including r-dropping (non-rhoticity), resistance to the horse–hoarse merger, and a "breaking" of certain syllables in two. Traditional Maine accents are rapidly declining; a 2013 study of Portland speakers found resistance to the horse–hoarse merger waning among all age groups; however, it also found the newer cot–caught merger to be resisted, despite the latter being typical among other Maine speakers, even well-reported in the 1990s in Portland itself. The merger is widely reported throughout Maine as of 2018, particularly outside the urban areas. In the northern region of Maine along the Quebec and the New-Brunswick border, Franco-Americans may show French-language influences in their English. Certain vocabulary is also unique to Maine.

== Phonology ==
One phonological feature of the traditional Maine accent, like in Eastern New England English generally, is that the "r" sound is only pronounced when it comes before a vowel, but not before a consonant or in any final position. For example, "car" may sound to listeners like "cah" and "Mainer" like "Mainah."

Also, as in much New England English, the final "-ing" ending in multi-syllable words sounds more like "-in," for example, in stopping [ˈstɒpɪn] and starving [ˈstavɪn].

Vowels of the Maine accent
	Front		Central		Back	
	lax	tense	lax	tense	lax	tense
Close	ɪ	i			ʊ	u
Mid	ɛ	eɪ	ə	ɜ	ʌ	oʊ
Open	æ			a		ɒ
Diphthongs	aɪ ɔɪ aʊ					

Thus, Maine accent follows the pronunciation of Eastern New England English, like the Boston accent, but with the following additional features:

- Resistance to the horse–hoarse merger makes a word like horse have a pure vowel /ɒ/, while hoarse has a centering diphthong or disyllabic /oʊə/. Together with non-rhoticity, this potentially yields a NORTH–LOT–THOUGHT merger (expanding even beyond the cot-caught merger of all Northern New England English), so that tort, tot, and taught are phonemically all /tɒt/, while the FORCE vowel remains distinct. Thus, another two example words that would traditionally be distinguished in Maine are for /fɒ/ versus four /foʊə/.
- NURSE /ɜː/, unlike in modern-day Boston, may be a pure vowel without r-coloring, much like in British Received Pronunciation: [əː]. This makes vowel length marginally phonemic in unstressed (but not stressed) syllables, so the second syllable of password is [wəːd] but of forward is [wəd]. (In rhotic General American English, these two syllables would not be distinguished.)
- NEAR, SQUARE and FORCE are diphthongs or disyllabic sequences, consisting respectively of FLEECE, FACE, GOAT plus the schwa vowel (as in the end of COMMA): here /hiə/, there /ðeɪə/ and more /moʊə/, in all cases with a possible glide after the stressed vowel: [ˈhijə, ˈðeɪjə, ˈmoʊwə].

== Lexicon ==
Much of Maine's vocabulary is shared with other varieties of Eastern New England English, however some of it is specific to Maine. This vocabulary includes, but is not limited to, the following terms:

- apiece — an undetermined distance (as in "He lives down the road apiece")
- ayuh /ˈeɪə/ — yes; okay; sure; that's right
- beater — a (beaten up) motor vehicle with value so diminished by extensive road salt corrosion there is little concern about additional collision damage from driving on icy roads
- blueback trout — arctic char (Salvelinus alpinus)
- bug — lobster
- kout! — Look out!
- chupta? — What are you up to?
- corner — the neighborhood surrounding an intersection of rural roads (usually prefixed by the surname of an early resident of that intersection, as in "Woodfords Corner")
- culch — trash or rubbish
- cunning — cute (as in "She's a cunnin' one, she is")
- cutter — an active child or younger person (from comparison to the harbor behavior of small, maneuverable cutters among larger ships)
- dinner pail — lunch box
- dite — a tiny amount (as in "Just a dite")
- divan as a generic term for couch (as opposed to the more specific, non-dialectal meaning). Derived from French.
- door yard (/ˈdoʊə jad/) — the yard or occupant's space outside a dwelling's exterior door—sometimes decorated with ornamental plants, and often used for temporary storage of tools, toys, sleds, carts, or bicycles
- Down East — loosely refers to the coastal regions of Hancock and Washington counties; because boats traveled downwind from Boston to Maine, as well as east as they travelled farther north up the coast of Maine (as in "I'm headin' Down East this weekend") - also used in Canadian English, possibly as the aforementioned Maine counties are close to parts of Atlantic Canada.
- dressing — application of manure to a garden
- dry-ki — an accumulation of floating dead wood on the downwind shore of a lake
- fart (old faht) — an inflexibly meticulous individual
- flatlander — visitor from elsewhere, often from Massachusetts due to its flat topography
- gawmy — clumsy and awkward
- honkin — extraordinarily large
- hot top — asphaltic pavement
- Italian sandwich or Italian — Maine Italian sandwich
- jimmies — chocolate dessert sprinkles
- johnny — hospital gown
- kife — to steal (usually a small, useful item of low cost)
- lawn sale — yard sale
- nippy — cold enough to stiffen one's nipples
- notional — stubborn
- numb — dumb; stupid (as in "Numb son you got there")
- pahtridge — ruffed grouse (Bonasa umbellus) (from partridge)
- pekid — feeling unwell
- pot — lobster trap
- prayer handle — knee
- quahog — thick-shelled clam (Mercenaria mercenaria)

- scrid — a tiny piece; a little bit
- right out straight — too busy to take a break
- spleeny — overly sensitive
- squaretail (/ˈskweɪəteɪl/) — brook trout (Salvelinus fontinalis)
- steamers — soft-shell clams (Mya arenaria)
- stove in/stove up — nautical term meaning bash in (as in "Stoved all ta hell")
- togue — lake trout (Salvelinus namaycush)

== In popular culture ==
- John Neal (1793–1876) was one of the first authors to feature regional American accents and colloquialisms in his writing, some of which is considered primary source material for studies on the Maine accent. His 1835 play, Our Ephraim, or The New Englanders, A What-d'ye-call-it?–in three Acts, is considered his most significant work in this regard.
- Maine humorist Marshall Dodge (1935–1982) based much of his humor from the Maine dialect, beginning first with his involvement with the series Bert & I, a "Down East" collection of humor stories created during the 1950s and 1960s.
- Well-known author, musician, and former television broadcaster Tim Sample is known nationally for his use of Maine vernacular.
- Judd Crandall, a main character in Stephen King's 1983 novel Pet Sematary, is written to have a thick Down East accent, his pronunciations often spelled phonetically throughout the novel.
