= Tim Sample =

Humorist

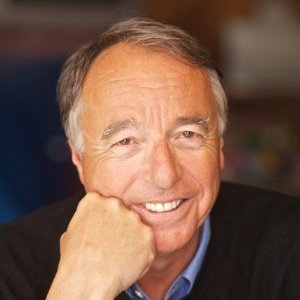
- Born: Timothy John Sample; January 30, 1951 (age 74); Fort Fairfield, Maine
- Education: Portland School of Art
- Occupation: Humorist
- Years active: 1967-present
- Known for: Maine humor

Timothy John Sample (born January 30, 1951) is a Maine humorist.

== Life and career ==
Sample was born in Fort Fairfield, Maine, and raised in Boothbay Harbor, where he attended local schools. He briefly attended Hebron Academy and in 2004 was given an honorary degree from the Academy. As a child in the 1960s, Sample was influenced by the comedy albums of Marshall Dodge and Robert Bryan of Bert and I. After dropping out of high school, Sample attended art school and joined various local bands in the Portland area. It was singer-songwriter Noel Paul Stookey who encouraged Sample to try his hand at comedy. "You know, we’ve got an awful lot of white males singing songs," Sample recalls Stookey telling him, "You do this thing where you can get people laughing, you’ve got this storytelling thing."

Sample's first album of Downeast humor was recorded in 1979. Between 1982 and 2012, Sample collaborated with Bryan on a number of projects including several TV specials and comedy albums, including How to Talk Yankee (1982), Bert and I Rebooted (2012), and the TV specials Out of Season and Maine Humor Behind the Barn. He has also written and illustrated several books, including How to Talk Yankee and Saturday Night at Moody's Diner. Sample has appeared on The Today Show, Good Morning America and in the summer of 1993, Sample served as a correspondent for Sunday Morning with Charles Kuralt. The segment “Postcard from Maine” lasted 11 years.

Sample has narrated several audiobooks, including Robert McCloskey’s Burt Dow: Deep-Water Man, Stephen King’s The Sun Dog and the documentary From Stump to Ship for Northeast Historic Films. In 2015, he was an Audie Award finalist for his narration of Stephen King’s humor novella Drunken Fireworks. Sample appeared in several pandemic safety PSAs funded and produced by the state of Maine; as well as TV, radio and online ads funded and produced by End Citizens United targeting US Senator Susan Collins.

Sample and his wife live in Portland, Maine, and Albuquerque, New Mexico.

== Published works ==
- Sample, Tim (January 1, 1985). Saturday Night at Moody's Diner Other Stories. Harpswell Press. ISBN 978-0884480365.
- Sample, Tim (August 11, 2014). How to Talk Yankee. North Country Press. ISBN 978-0945980070.
- Sample, Tim (May 3, 2011). Maine Curiosities. Globe Pequot Press. ISBN 978-0762761142.
