= 1940 United States Senate election in Maine =

- September 9, 1940
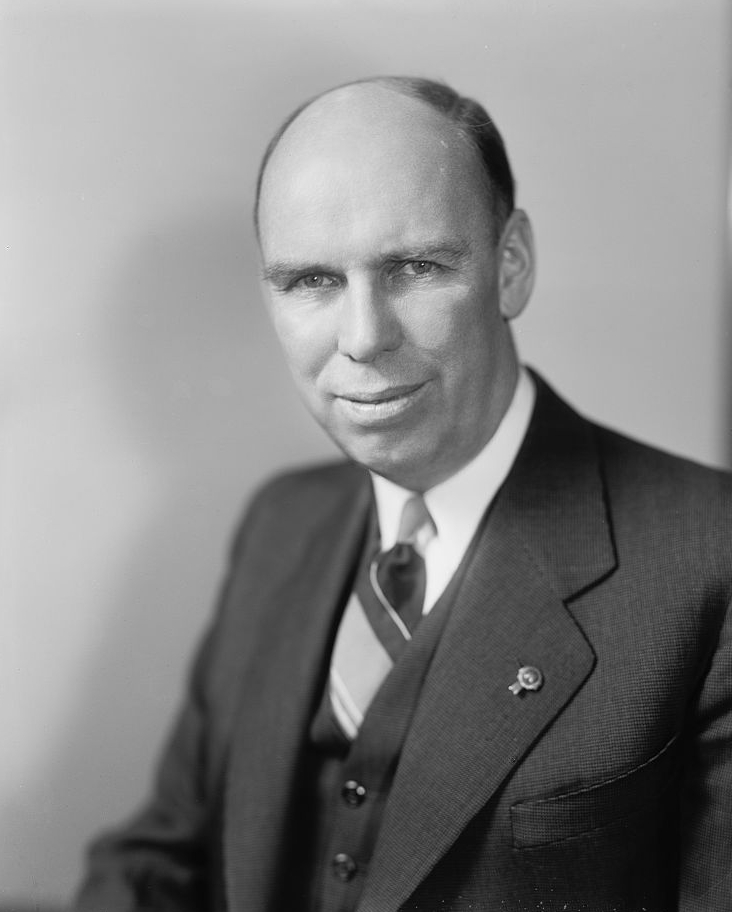

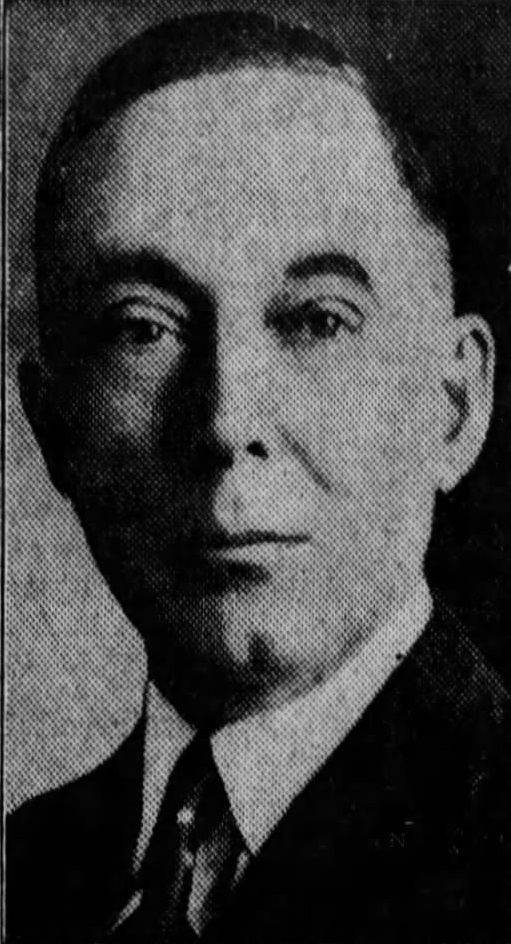
| Nominee | Owen Brewster | Louis Brann |
| Party | Republican | Democratic |
| Popular vote | 150,149 | 105,740 |
| Percentage | 58.61% | 41.27% |
- County results Brewster: 50–60% 60–70% 70–80% Brann: 50–60% 60–70%
U.S. senator before election
Frederick Hale
Republican
Elected U.S. Senator
Owen Brewster
Republican

The 1940 United States Senate election in Maine was held on September 9, 1940.

Incumbent Republican Senator Frederick Hale did not run for re-election. Republican U.S. Representative and former Governor Owen Brewster won the open seat, defeating two Governors of Maine: incumbent Republican Governor Lewis Barrows in the primary and former Democratic Governor Louis Brann in the general election.

== Republican primary ==
=== Candidates ===
- Lewis O. Barrows, Governor of Maine
- Owen Brewster, U.S. Representative from Dexter and former Governor (1925–29)

=== Results ===
1940 Republican U.S. Senate primary
| Party | Candidate | Votes | % |
|---|---|---|---|
| Republican | Owen Brewster | 70,623 | 58.88% |
| Republican | Lewis O. Barrows | 49,327 | 41.12% |
| Total votes | | 119,950 | 100.00% |

== Democratic primary ==
=== Candidates ===
- Louis J. Brann, former Governor of Maine (1933–37)

=== Results ===
Brann was unopposed for the Democratic nomination.

1940 Democratic U.S. Senate primary
| Party | Candidate | Votes | % |
|---|---|---|---|
| Democratic | Louis J. Brann | 23,015 | 100.00% |
| Total votes | | 23,015 | 100.00% |

== General election ==
=== Results ===
1940 U.S. Senate election in Maine
| Party | Candidate | Votes | % | ±% |
|---|---|---|---|---|
| Republican | Owen Brewster | 150,149 | 58.61% | ▲8.57 |
| Democratic | Louis J. Brann | 105,740 | 41.27% | ▼8.44 |
| Independent | Lewis Gordon | 305 | 0.12% | N/A |
| Total votes | | 256,194 | 100.00% | |

== See also ==
- 1940 United States Senate elections
