= Alfred K. Ames =

American politician

Alfred Kellar Ames (September 4, 1866 – May 19, 1950) was an American politician, businessperson and filmmaker. Ames, a Republican, served three terms (1915–20) in the Maine Senate. He owned the Machias Lumber Company.

In 1930, Ames and Dr. Howard Kane filmed From Stump to Ship, an industrial film about the logging industry. In 2002, the film was selected for preservation in the United States National Film Registry by the Library of Congress as being "culturally, historically, or aesthetically significant".

In 1934, Ames was the Republican nominee for governor. He lost to incumbent Democrat Louis J. Brann. His wife was a prominent member of the Daughters of the American Revolution and former state historian. The couple's home in Machias was an English colonial structure noted for its large garden.

Party political offices
Preceded by Burleigh Martin	Republican nominee for Governor of Maine; 1934	Succeeded by Lewis O. Barrows
