= 1936 United States Senate election in Maine =

- September 14, 1936
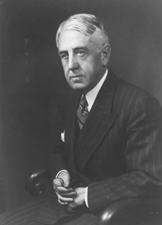

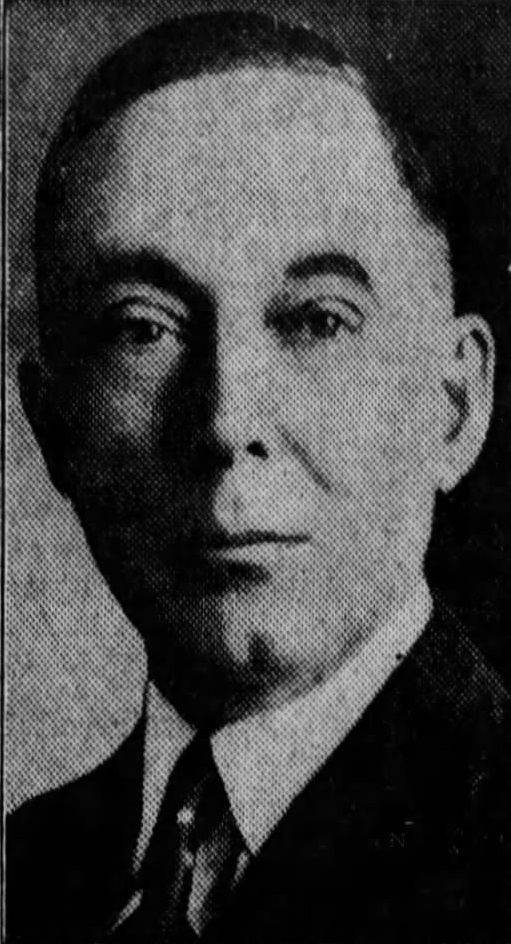
Nominee	Wallace White	Louis J. Brann
Party	Republican	Democratic
Popular vote	158,068	153,420
Percentage	50.75%	49.25%
- County results White: 50–60% 60–70% Brann: 50–60% 60–70%
U.S. senator before election
Wallace H. White Jr.
Republican
Elected U.S. Senator
Wallace H. White Jr.
Republican

The 1936 United States Senate election in Maine was held on September 14, 1936. Incumbent Republican U.S. Senator Wallace White was re-elected to a second term over Governor Louis J. Brann.

Although 1936 is typically seen as the end of Maine's status as a national bellwether, White's narrow victory in strongly Republican Maine may have been a portent of doom for Alf Landon's fall presidential campaign, in which he carried only Maine and nearby Vermont. Brann himself had overcome the state's Republican lean to win his two terms as governor.

== Republican primary ==
=== Candidates ===
- Wallace H. White Jr., incumbent Senator since 1931

=== Results ===
Senator White was unopposed for re-nomination.

1936 Republican U.S. Senate primary
Party	Candidate	Votes	%
Republican	Wallace H. White Jr. (inc.)	89,183	100.00%
Total votes		89,183	100.00%

== Democratic primary ==
=== Candidates ===
- Louis J. Brann, Governor of Maine since 1933

=== Results ===
Governor Brann was unopposed for the Democratic nomination.

1936 Democratic U.S. Senate primary
Party	Candidate	Votes	%
Democratic	Louis J. Brann	25,598	100.00%
Total votes		25,598	100.00%

== General election ==
=== Results ===
1936 U.S. Senate election in Maine
Party	Candidate	Votes	%	±%
Republican	Wallace H. White Jr. (inc.)	158,068	50.75%	▼10.20
Democratic	Louis J. Brann	153,420	49.25%	▲10.20
Total votes		311,488	100.00%	

== See also ==
- 1936 United States Senate elections
