= 1934 Maine gubernatorial election =

- September 10, 1934
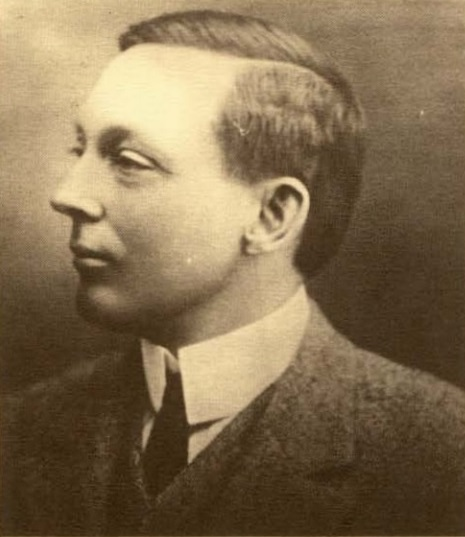

Nominee	Louis J. Brann	Alfred K. Ames
Party	Democratic	Republican
Popular vote	156,917	133,414
Percentage	53.99%	45.90%
- County results Brann: 50–60% 70–80% Ames: 50–60%
Governor before election
Louis J. Brann
Democratic
Elected Governor
Louis J. Brann
Democratic

The 1934 Maine gubernatorial election took place on September 10, 1934. Incumbent Democratic Governor Louis J. Brann defeated Republican challenger Alfred K. Ames.

This was the only Maine gubernatorial election in over a century (1851–1956) in which a Democratic governor won reelection.

== Results ==
1934 Maine gubernatorial election
Party	Candidate	Votes	%	±%
Democratic	Louis J. Brann (Incumbent)	156,917	53.99%	
Republican	Alfred K. Ames	133,414	45.90%	
Communist	Harry Warsaw	318	0.11%	
Majority		23,503	8.09%	
Turnout		290,649	100.00%	
Democratic hold		Swing		
