= 1938 Maine gubernatorial election =

- September 12, 1938
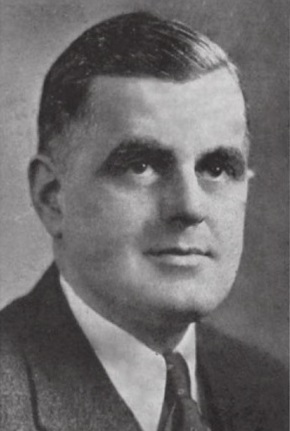

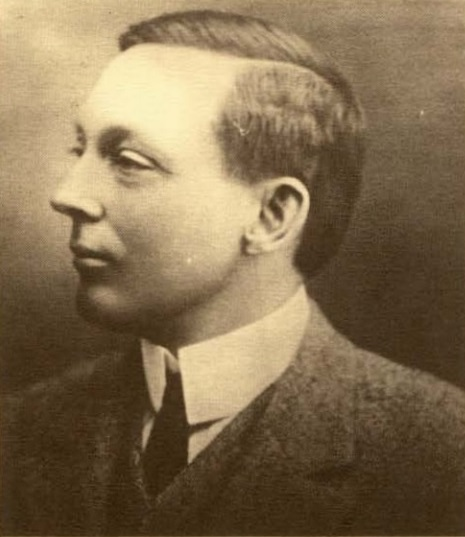
Nominee	Lewis O. Barrows	Louis J. Brann
Party	Republican	Democratic
Popular vote	157,206	139,745
Percentage	52.89%	47.01%
- County results Barrows: 50–60% 60–70% Brann: 50–60% 60–70%
Governor before election
Lewis O. Barrows
Republican
Elected Governor
Lewis O. Barrows
Republican

The 1938 Maine gubernatorial election took place on September 12, 1938. Incumbent Republican Governor Lewis O. Barrows defeated Democratic Party challenger (and former Governor) Louis J. Brann. Communist Party USA candidate Winfred V. Tabbutt received 325 votes.

Barrows' re-election coincided with a clean sweep by Maine Republicans.

== Results ==
1938 Gubernatorial Election, Maine
Party	Candidate	Votes	%	±%
Republican	Lewis O. Barrows (Incumbent)	157,206	52.89%	
Democratic	Louis J. Brann	139,745	47.01%	
Communist	Winfred V. Tabbutt	287	0.10%	
Majority		17,461	5.88%	
