= From Stump to Ship =

1930 American industrial film

- Directed by: Alfred K. Ames, Howard Kane
- Distributed by: Northeast Historic Film
- Release date: 1930
- Running time: 30 minutes
- Country: United States
- Language: English

From Stump to Ship is an amateur industrial film by Alfred K. Ames, former State Senator and owner of the Machias Lumber Company, in Machias, Maine as well as by Dr. Howard Kane of Washington, DC.

== Summary ==
From Stump to Ship

The half-hour 16mm film was shot over the winter of 1930 in the logging woods and shows logging in the forest with hand tools and horses, then moves to the spring log drive, with loggers using peaveys to break up log jams on icy rivers as the logs are moved from the forest to the mill. The film portrays detailed views of mill work, changing the bandsaw, and making shingles.

== Production ==
Lumber is loaded onto schooners in Machias for transport to New York. The film was originally silent, with a typed script which Ames read aloud when he showed the film. In 1985, with funds from the Maine Humanities Council, the narration was recorded with the film.

The film was distributed by Northeast Historic Film, in Bucksport, Maine. Footage was included in the compilation documentary Woodsmen and River Drivers, Another Day, Another Era which also interviewed the surviving woodsmen of the Machias Lumber Company.

== Legacy ==
In 2002, the film was selected for preservation in the United States National Film Registry by the Library of Congress as being "culturally, historically, or aesthetically significant".
