= William P. Moss =

American lawyer and politician

William Preston Moss (April 26, 1897, in Jackson, Tennessee – December 25, 1985, in Jackson, Tennessee) was an American lawyer and politician. He was a member of the Tennessee State Senate from 1933 to 1937, serving as Speaker of the Senate in the 1936-7 session.

== Early life ==
Moss' parents were William Mortimer Moss (1839–1929) and Mary Peyton (Randolph) Moss (1861–1933). After serving in the army in World War I as a corporal, he attended Vanderbilt University in Nashville, Tennessee and graduated with a BA and LLB in 1921. He immediately set up a law practice in Jackson.

== Career ==
Moss served as the Jackson city attorney from 1925 to 1943. A Democrat, he was elected to two terms in the Tennessee State Senate, serving from 1933 to 1937, and was elected speaker for the 1936-7 session. (In Tennessee, the speaker of the senate is second in line for the governorship, similar to the lieutenant governor in other states.) In 1937-8 he served as a special judge on the Court of Appeals. From 1943 to 1945 he was the president of the Jackson-Madison Bar Association. In 1953 he served as a member of a constitutional convention to revise the constitution. Moss was the chairman of the Tennessee Bar Association 1960–1. In 1963 he was appointed to the newly constituted Law Revision Commission.

== Personal life ==
Moss married Lutitia Saxon Myers (1914–1995) on June 29, 1935; they had 4 children, William Preston Moss Jr. (1936–1997), Michael Durham Moss (1938–2022), John Ramsey Moss (1941–2011), Mary Lutitia Pettigrew (19??– ).
