= Bert & I =

Stories accounting Maine's culture

Bert & I is the name given to numerous collections of humor stories set in the "Down East" culture of traditional Maine. These stories were made famous and mostly written by the humorist storytelling team of Marshall Dodge (1935–1982) and Bob Bryan (1931–2018) in the 1950s and the 1960s and in later years through retellings by Allen Wicken.

The stories communicate the quirkiness of rural New England and Maine culture, told in the traditional folksy New England storytelling vein with a dry wit that inspired the Lake Wobegon stories that would begin appearing in 1974.

The title characters are fishermen by trade, operating a motor vessel named Bluebird (and later Bluebird II), based out of Kennebunkport. Many of the longer stories of Bert & I collections involve incidents during a day's work, with careful detail given to the intricacies of the trade (especially through sound effects vocalized by Dodge).

One story, Which Way to Millinocket?, adapts the "You can't get there from here" trope of the 19th-century "Arkansas Traveler" tradition to a New England accent. The similarly titled Which Way to East Vassalboro? has a different, anti-urbanite theme.

The stories spread beyond New England during the 1970s and 1980s and introduced many parts of the country and world to the regionally distinct Maine (or "Yankee") accent. In 1982, Bryan released a Bert & I mock language tape, How to Talk Yankee, with fellow Maine humorist Tim Sample.

== Discography ==
- Bert and I... And Other Stories from Down East (1958)
- More Bert and I... And Other Stories from Down East (1961) BI-5
- The Return of Bert and I: How the Bluebird II Plugged the Hole in the Machias Maru, Thus Saving the Coast of Maine and Other Stories (1961) BI-9
- Bert and I Stem Inflation (1961) BI-11
- Bert and I... On Stage (1977) BI-12
- from Bert and I... How to Talk Yankee (1977) BI-14
- Bert and I presents... Tim Sample - Back in spite of Popular Demand (1985) BI-16
- A Maine Pot-Hellion
