= Northeast Historic Film =

Film archive in Bucksport, Maine

Northeast Historic Film (NHF) is a regional moving image archive located in Bucksport, Maine. It is a tax-exempt nonprofit organization dedicated to collecting, preserving and sharing film and video related to the people of Northern New England.

The archive safeguards film and videotape through restoration, duplication, creation of access tools such as catalog records, and climate-controlled storage in its Conservation Center.

== The Collection ==
NHF collects professional and amateur moving images related to Maine, New Hampshire, Vermont, and Massachusetts. The films and videos are preserved and made available to members of the public, scholars, and members of the film and video production community.

The collection includes home movies, silent dramas, industrial films, and independent projects. NHF also has a substantial collection of footage from local television stations dating back to the 1950s. The archives hold over 10 million feet of film and 8,000 videotapes from 1896 to the present.

In addition to its moving image collections, NHF also has a large collection of moving image technology including projectors, cameras, splicers, and viewers, as well as film ephemera including posters, scrapbooks, sheet music, letters, and theater logs.

== Education ==
NHF offers programs for the public, including screenings, online exhibits and events at art museums, film festivals, and agricultural fairs. For moving image professionals, NHF offers internships, onsite and traveling workshops, and an annual summer symposium. They offer a William O'Farrell Fellowship to support study in Northeast Historic Film's collections.

== History ==
Karan Sheldon and David Weiss founded Northeast Historic Film in 1986. Two years later, NHF collaborated with other archives and the Museum of Modern Art to restore the 1921 film “The Seventh Day.” In 1990, NHF began work on “Going to the Movies: A Social History of Motion Pictures in Maine Communities.” The completed project—an exhibition including lectures and screenings—ran at The Maine Mall and Burlington Square Mall in 1996.

With the help of members and friends, NHF bought the Alamo Theatre in downtown Bucksport in 1992. The renovation of the 1916 cinema brought community theater back to Bucksport, Maine. Soon after NHF purchased the building, the archive opened the doors for a public 16mm film screening series. The cinema shows current films every weekend and hosts a number of special events, including screenings of old films projected in their original format. Each screening begins with an Archival Moment, a brief selection from the archives.

In 2003, NHF opened a 27,000-square-foot (2,500 m^{2}) climate-controlled Conservation Center.

== Membership services ==
NHF began offering memberships to the public in 1989. In 1991, NHF created a free video loan program for members. As of 2023, the program has over 450 historic videos available to loan.

== Conservation Center ==
In 2002, NHF broke ground on its $1.8 million state-of-the-art Conservation Center. Nicknamed “The Cube,” the facility was completed in 2003 and is located behind the Alamo Theatre. The structure has 27,000 square feet (2,500 m^{2}) of closely monitored, climate-controlled conditions for film storage and preservation. The Conservation Center has three temperature- and humidity-controlled floors. Two floors are kept at 45 degrees Fahrenheit and 25% relative humidity. The third floor, designed to prevent further deterioration of films suffering from advanced vinegar syndrome, is kept at 25 degrees Fahrenheit and 30% relative humidity.

The structure's purpose follows the Library of Congress's National Film Preservation Plan and is the only preservation-level audiovisual storage in the region. In addition to climate-controlled conditions, the Conservation Center is equipped with advanced air filtration and exchange technology, an environmentally friendly fire suppression system, and flood protection. More than forty-five storage clients from across North America send motion picture film and videotape to NHF for safekeeping.

== Awards ==
In 2003, founders Karan Sheldon and David Weiss received Maine Humanities Council’s Constance H. Carlson Award for exemplary service to the Humanities.

In 2013, the Association of Moving Image Archivists honored NHF with the Silver Light Award, for its substantial contributions to the field.

The Society for Cinema and Media Studies named the anthology Amateur Movie Making: Aesthetics of the every day in New England Films, 1915-1960, as 2018 "Best Edited Collection." The book, published by Indiana University Press, contains essays addressing works from the collections of Northeast Historic Film.
