= Joanne Brekke =

American politician (1935–2017)

Member of the Washington House of Representatives from the District 32 district
- In office 1978–1993

Personal details
- Born: April 18, 1935 North Bend, Washington
- Died: February 9, 2017 (aged 81) Seattle, Washington
- Party: Democratic
- Education: University of Washington (BA, sociology)

Joanne J. Brekke-Selk (née Sorensen; April 18, 1935 – February 9, 2017) was an American politician. She was a Democrat, representing District 32 in the Washington House of Representatives which included parts of King County, from 1978 to 1993. In the state legislature, she chaired the Legislative Action Committee and worked closely with the American Civil Liberties Union.
