= Lewis O. Barrows =

American politician (1893–1967)

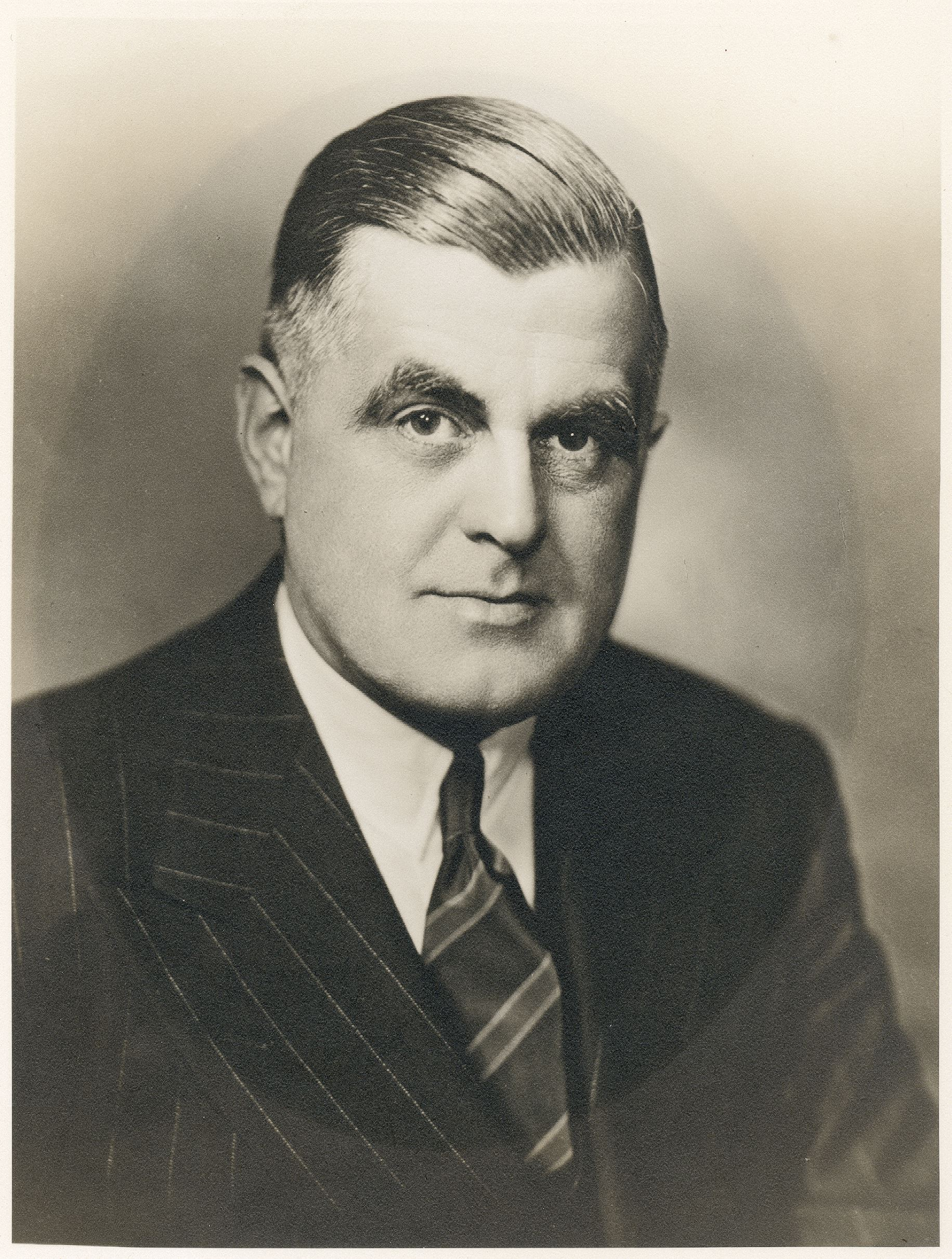

57th Governor of Maine
- In office January 6, 1937 – January 1, 1941
- Preceded by: Louis J. Brann
- Succeeded by: Sumner Sewall

Secretary of State of Maine
- In office 1935–1937
- Governor: Louis J. Brann
- Preceded by: Robinson C. Tobey
- Succeeded by: Frederick Robie

Personal details
- Born: June 7, 1893 Newport, Maine, U.S.
- Died: January 30, 1967 (aged 73) Pittsfield, Maine, U.S.
- Party: Republican
- Education: University of Maine

Lewis Orin Barrows (June 7, 1893 – January 30, 1967) was an American politician and the 57th governor of Maine.

== Early life ==
Barrows was born in Newport, Maine, on June 7, 1893. He studied in the local schools of Newport, and later attended the University of Maine, from which he graduated in 1916 with a Bachelor of Science degree in pharmacy.

At the start of his career, Barrows was employed in his family's drug store, and he later became involved in the insurance business.

== Politics ==
Barrow became the treasurer of Newport and held that position for twelve years. In 1926, he became a Republican state committeeman. He became a member of the governor's executive council in 1927. He held that position until 1933. He served as Maine's secretary of state from 1935 to 1936.

Barrow was nominated by the Republican Party for the governorship of Maine in 1936, and went on to win the general election. In 1937, Barrows sent the Maine Army National Guard to Lewiston, Maine and Auburn, Maine following a melee between workers and the local police during the Lewiston-Auburn Shoe Strike. He was also successful in his re-election bid in 1938, and held the governor's office from January 6, 1937, to January 1, 1941. During his administration, the state deficit of Maine was reduced, the budget was balanced, the state school fund was improved, old-age benefits payments were reinstated, the Maine Development Commissions' duties were increased, and federal funding was secured and those funding were used for the construction of new bridges, highways and public buildings.

== Later years ==
After leaving the governor's office, Barrows worked for the Liberty Mutual Insurance Company in Boston. He died on January 30, 1967, in Pittsfield, Maine.

== Sources ==
=== Internet ===
- National Governors Association. "Biography, Governor Lewis Orin Barrows". www.nga.org. Washington, DC: NGA.
- "Biography, Lewis O. Barrows". Maine Encyclopedia. Harpswell, ME: Publius Research.

=== Books ===
- University of Maine (1916). Catalog of the University of Maine, 1916-1917. Orono, ME: The University Press.

== External sources ==
- Sobel, Robert and John Raimo. Biographical Directory of the Governors of the United States, 1789-1978. Greenwood Press, 1988. ISBN 0-313-28093-2

Party political offices
Preceded by Alfred K. Ames	Republican nominee for Governor of Maine; 1936, 1938	Succeeded by Sumner Sewall
Political offices
Preceded by Robinson C. Tobey	Secretary of State of Maine; 1935–1936	Succeeded by Frederick Robie
Preceded by Louis J. Brann	Governor of Maine; 1937–1941	Succeeded by Sumner Sewall
