= Mary Alice Quinn =

Quinn's grave at Holy Sepulchre Cemetery

Mary Alice Quinn (December 28, 1920 – November 8, 1935) was a girl from Chicago, Illinois who died at the age of 14 from a chronic heart condition. She was reportedly a devout Catholic who said prayers daily to St. Therese of Liseaux, and her gravesite at Holy Sepulchre Cemetery in Alsip, Illinois is an unofficial pilgrimage destination. She has been described as "Chicago's Miracle Child" and "Chicago's Unofficial Saint".
