= Marshall Dodge =

American storyteller (1935–1982)

Marshall Dodge (1935–1982) was a Maine humorist.

== Early life ==
Dodge was born in New York City, attended high school in New Hampshire, and graduated from Yale University with a degree in philosophy.

== Career ==
Dodge and his associate, Robert Bryan (1931 – 2018), put out several defining albums of Maine humor, starting with Bert & I, released in 1958. In 1964, he and Noel Parmentel published (with accompanying LP record) a parody of popular folk songs titled Folk Songs for Conservatives.

During the early 1970s, Dodge performed at various clubs around New England, including in Mystic, Connecticut. In 1976, he founded the Maine Festival of the Arts at Bowdoin College. In a 1979 interview, Dodge claimed that his real love was philosophy, and that he was writing a book on the subject.

== Death ==
Dodge died in a hit-and-run accident in 1982 in Waimea, Hawaii.
