= Louis J. Brann =

American politician (1876–1948)

Louis Jefferson Brann
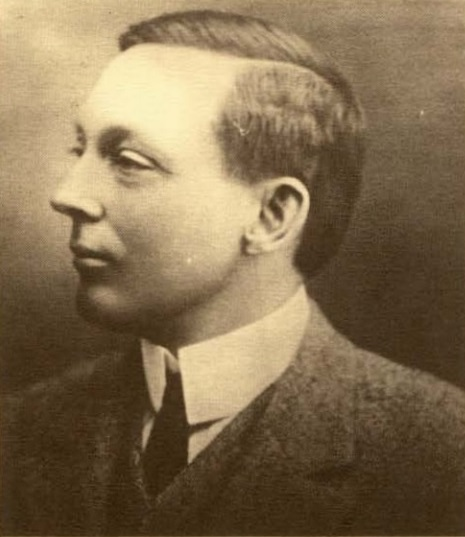
- From 1982's Historic Lewiston: Its Government

56th Governor of Maine
- In office January 4, 1933 – January 6, 1937
- Preceded by: William T. Gardiner
- Succeeded by: Lewis O. Barrows

Mayor of Lewiston, Maine
- In office 1922–1924
- Preceded by: William H. Newell
- Succeeded by: Robert J. Wiseman
- In office 1915–1916
- Preceded by: Robert J. Wiseman
- Succeeded by: Charles P. Lemaire

Register of Probate for Androscoggin County, Maine
- In office 1909–1913
- Preceded by: Fred O. Watson
- Succeeded by: James W. Murray

Personal details
- Born: July 6, 1876 Madison, Maine, U.S.
- Died: February 3, 1948 (aged 71) Falmouth, Maine, U.S.
- Party: Democratic
- Spouse: Martha "Mattie" Cobb n(m. 1902)
- Children: 4
- Education: University of Maine
- Profession: Attorney

Louis Jefferson Brann (July 6, 1876 – February 3, 1948) was an American lawyer and political figure. He was the 56th governor of Maine.

== Early life ==
Brann was born in Madison, Maine to Charles M. Brann and Nancy Lancaster Brann. He attended schools in Gardiner, Maine. He graduated from the University of Maine in 1898, after which he studied law. He was admitted to the bar in 1902 and began a practice in Lewiston. In the late 1920s he formed Brann & Isaacson with Peter A. Isaacson, a law firm which is still in existence (2010).

On March 8, 1902, Brann married Martha "Mattie" Cobb. They were the parents of four children—Donald L., Marjorie, Dorothy L., and Nancy E.

Brann participated widely in local and state government: he was the Androscoggin County Register of Probate (1909-1913); a municipal judge (1913–1915); mayor of Lewiston (1915–1917 and 1922–1925); member of the Maine House of Representatives (1919–1920); and delegate to the Democratic National Convention from Maine (1924, 1936, 1940 and 1944). He also served a term as chairman of the Maine Democratic Party.

== Governor of Maine ==
Brann ran successfully for Governor of Maine in 1932, and was also successful in his re-election bid in 1934. During his administration, a constitutional amendment was sanctioned that secured two million dollars in state bonds for emergency relief during the Great Depression. As part of an initiative to promote Maine tourism and economic development, Brann entertained many celebrities at Blaine House; the "Maine Summer Visitors Day" program he started brought notables to Maine including Boston Braves President Emil Fuchs, authors Gladys Hasty Carroll, Kenneth Roberts and Ben Ames Williams, and singer Rudy Vallee.

Brann was the only Democratic governor of Maine between 1917, when Oakley C. Curtis left office, and 1955, when Edmund Muskie assumed office.

== Later years ==
Brann embarked on several other runs for office, although he would never again be elected. He ran unsuccessfully for the United States Senate in 1936, for governor in 1938, for the other Maine Senate seat in 1940, and for Maine's 1st District seat in the United States House of Representatives in 1942.

Shortly after leaving office, and as German antisemitism was turning violent, Brann signed a letter from the American Christian Conference on the Jewish Problem calling for the establishment of a Jewish state in Mandatory Palestine and criticizing the treatment of Jews in Germany, Poland, and Romania.

Brann was a member of the Church of Christ, Scientist, and held membership in Beta Theta Pi, and the Knights of Pythias, Elks, National Grange,} and Lions Club.

Brann died in Lewiston on February 3, 1948. He was buried at Riverside Cemetery in Lewiston.

== See also ==
- List of mayors of Lewiston, Maine

== Sources ==
=== Books ===
- Fellowship Forum (1935). Who's Who In Our American Government. The Fellowship Forum: Washington, DC.
- Kirk, geneva; Barrows, gridley (1982). Historic Lewiston: Its Government. Auburn, ME: Central Maine Vocational Technical Institute.
- Maine Executive Department (1907). Register of the Executive Department of the State of Maine. Augusta, ME: Kennebec Journal Print.
- Maine Executive Department (1914). Public Documents of the State of Maine for the Year 1912. Vol. II. Waterville, ME: Sentinel Publishing Company.
- Marquis, A. N. (1938). Who's Who In New England. Vol. 3. A. N. Marquis: Chicago, IL.
- White, James T. (1949). The National Cyclopedia of American Biography. J. T. White: Chicago, IL. p. 269.

=== Internet ===
- "Lewis J. Brann and Martha "Mattie" K. Cobb in the Maine Marriage Index, 1892-1996". Ancestry.com. Provo, UT: Ancestry.com, LLC. March 8, 1902.
- "Biography, Louis J. Brann". www.nga.org/. National Governors Association.
- "Brann, Louis J." Maine: An Encyclopedia. South Harpswell, ME.

== External sources ==
- Sobel, Robert and John Raimo. Biographical Directory of the Governors of the United States, 1789-1978. Greenwood Press, 1988. ISBN 0-313-28093-2
- Louis J. Brann at Find a Grave

Party political offices
Preceded by Edward C. Moran Jr.	Democratic nominee for Governor of Maine; 1932, 1934	Succeeded by F. Harold Dubord
Preceded by Frank W. Haskell	Democratic nominee for U.S. Senator from Maine (Class 2); 1936	Succeeded by Fulton J. Redman
Preceded by F. Harold Dubord	Democratic nominee for Governor of Maine; 1938	Succeeded by Fulton J. Redman
Preceded by F. Harold Dubord	Democratic nominee for U.S. senator from Maine (Class 1); 1940	Succeeded by Peter M. MacDonald
Political offices
Preceded by William Tudor Gardiner	Governor of Maine; 1933–1937	Succeeded by Lewis O. Barrows
