= East Vassalboro Grist and Saw Mill =

- U.S. National Register of Historic Places
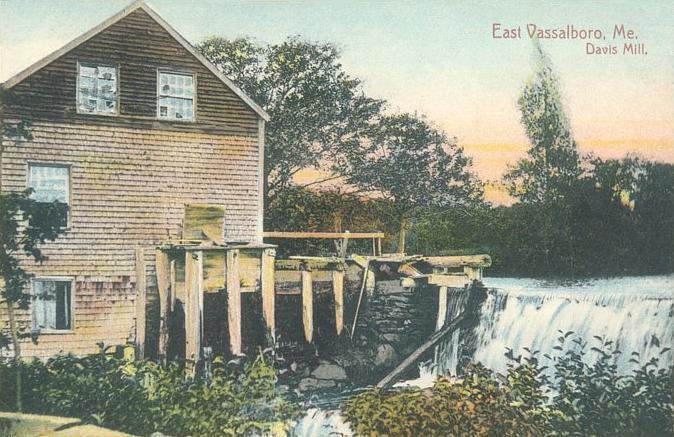
- 1910 postcard view of an East Vassalboro mill

- Location within Maine Location within the United States
- Location: ME 32, East Vassalboro, Maine
- Coordinates: 44°27′7″N 69°36′24″W
- Area: 1 acre (0.40 ha)
- Built: 1798
- Built by: Getchell, John; Dow, Jabez
- NRHP reference No.: 82000752
- Added to NRHP: January 28, 1982

The East Vassalboro Grist and Saw Mill is a historic mill complex in East Vassalboro, Maine. Established in the late 18th century, it is one of the oldest water-powered mills in the state, with a working complement of grist and lumber milling equipment. It was listed on the National Register of Historic Places in 1982.

== Description and history ==
The East Vassalboro Mill is located near the northern end of the village of East Vassalboro, which is located at the mouth of Outlet Stream, which drains out of China Lake. The mill is set on the east side of SR 32, and has two primary buildings on either side of a mill race, from which water for their power is drawn. The sawmill is a 1-1/2 story timber frame structure, with some elements of its frame 1 foot (0.30 m) in width and 57 feet (17 m) long. It is covered by a metal gabled roof, and has two shed additions added to the north and east. This mill was built in 1798 by John Getchell, and was originally located about 300 yards (270 m) upstream. It was moved to its present location in 1805 by Jabez Dow, around the time he built the grist mill.

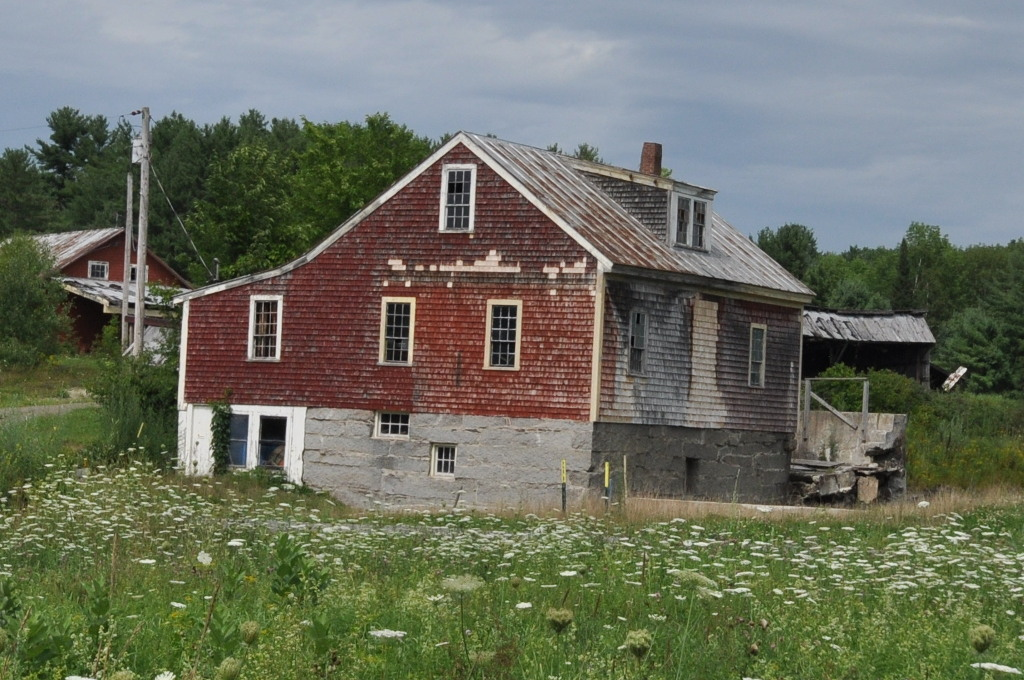
The mill in 2018

The grist mill is also a 1-1/2 story frame structure with a gabled roof, and a shed extension to the north. It is set on a foundation of cut granite, which is exposed on the west side and fitted with a doorway and window openings.

The mills were owned in the mid-19th century by members of the Butterfield family, and purchased in 1870 by the Vassalboro Woolen Company. In 1912, they were bought by Louis Masse, whose family operated them for much of the 20th century.

== See also ==
- National Register of Historic Places listings in Kennebec County, Maine
