= Waterville Senior High School =

Location
- 1 Brooklyn Avenue, Waterville ME; Waterville, Maine 04901; United States
- Coordinates: 44°33′08″N 69°38′43″W

Information
- School type: Public, high school
- Opened: 1964
- School district: Waterville Public Schools
- CEEB code: 201075
- Principal: Brian M. Laramee
- Faculty: 42.40
- Grades: 9–12
- Enrollment: 502 (2023-2024)
- Colors: Purple, White, and Black
- Mascot: Purple Panther
- Nickname: Waterville
- Team name: Purple Panthers
- Accreditation: New England Association of School and Colleges
- Yearbook: The Nautilus
- Communities served: Waterville, Maine
- Feeder schools: Waterville Junior High School
- Website: wshs.aos92.org

Waterville Senior High School, also known as Waterville High School or WSHS, is a public high school in Waterville, Maine, United States, serving students in grades 9–12. Waterville Senior High School replaced the Old Waterville High School in 1964, when the Waterville Junior High School moved into the old high school building.

== History ==
Waterville High School has had three campuses since its founding in 1876. The first building served the community from 1876 until the completion of the Old Waterville High School (also known as the Gilman Street School) in 1913. WSHS remained in the Gilman Street School until the completion of the current high school in 1964.

=== 2007-2018 District Consolidation ===
Until 2007, Waterville Senior High School and the other Waterville Public Schools were part of their own, independent district. However, a bill signed into law by former Maine governor John Baldacci required communities to seek to consolidate their school districts or else face monetary penalties. Waterville Public Schools consolidated with the towns of Vassalboro and Winslow, Maine, to form Kennebec Valley Consolidated Schools to avoid the penalties laid out under the new law. In 2018, voters from all three towns within the consolidated district held town referendums to dissolve the district and return to the original independent districts.

== Athletics ==
=== Classification ===
Waterville Senior High School participates in the following Maine classifications:

- Class A/Class A North: Drama
- Class B/Class B North: Baseball, girls' basketball, cheerleading, cross country, golf, ice hockey, boys' soccer, girls' soccer, softball, swim, tennis, indoor track, outdoor track
- Class C/Class C South: Boys' basketball
- 8-Man Large (Football)

=== State sports championships ===
Waterville has won numerous Maine high school sports championships.

- Baseball: 2010, 2011
- Boys' Basketball: 1944, 1945, 1949, 1985
- Girls' Basketball: 2007–2009
- Field Hockey: 1979, 2007
- Football: 1962, 1974
- Boys' Golf: 1969, 1976, 1996, 2006
- Girls' Golf: 1995–1998
- Ice Hockey: 1927, 1928, 1931, 1932, 1938–1941, 1969–1973, 1979–1981, 1991, 1996, 2001, 2009, 2016, 2017
- Skiing: 1975
- Boys' Soccer: 1983, 2000
- Girls' Soccer: 1980–1984, 2008, 2014
- Boys' Tennis: 1986, 1998
- Girls' Tennis: 2021
- Boys' Indoor Track: 2014
- Girls' Indoor Track: 1980, 2000–2002, 2007, 2009, 2011–2015
- Boys' Outdoor Track: 2006–2008
- Girls' Outdoor Track: 1976, 2002, 2007-2015

=== New England Championships ===
Waterville won one New England sports championship with boys' basketball in 1944.

== Demographics ==
Race or ethnicity

- American Indian/Alaska Native: 0.6%
- Asian: 1.4%
- Native Hawaiian/Pacific Islander: 0.2%
- Hispanic: 7.6%
- Black, non-Hispanic: 1.2%
- White, non-Hispanic: 83.4%
- Two or More Races: 5.7%

Gender

- Male: 265
- Female: 247

== Notable alumni ==
- George J. Mitchell - Former U.S. senator for Maine
