= Waterville Public Schools =

School district in Maine, United States

Waterville Public Schools is a school district in Waterville, Maine, United States.

Waterville was a part of Kennebec Valley Consolidated Schools (AOS92) until July 1, 2018.

== Schools ==
- Waterville Senior High School
- Waterville Junior High School
- Albert S. Hall School
- George J. Mitchell School

Superintendent: Eric L. Haley School Board Chair: Sara Sylvester

== History ==
Waterville Schools were independent until 2007 when area school districts merged as required by law. Waterville became a member of AOS 92, along with Winslow and Vassalboro. In 2018, the district dissolved, and Waterville returned to an independent district.
