= South China, Maine =

- Unincorporated community
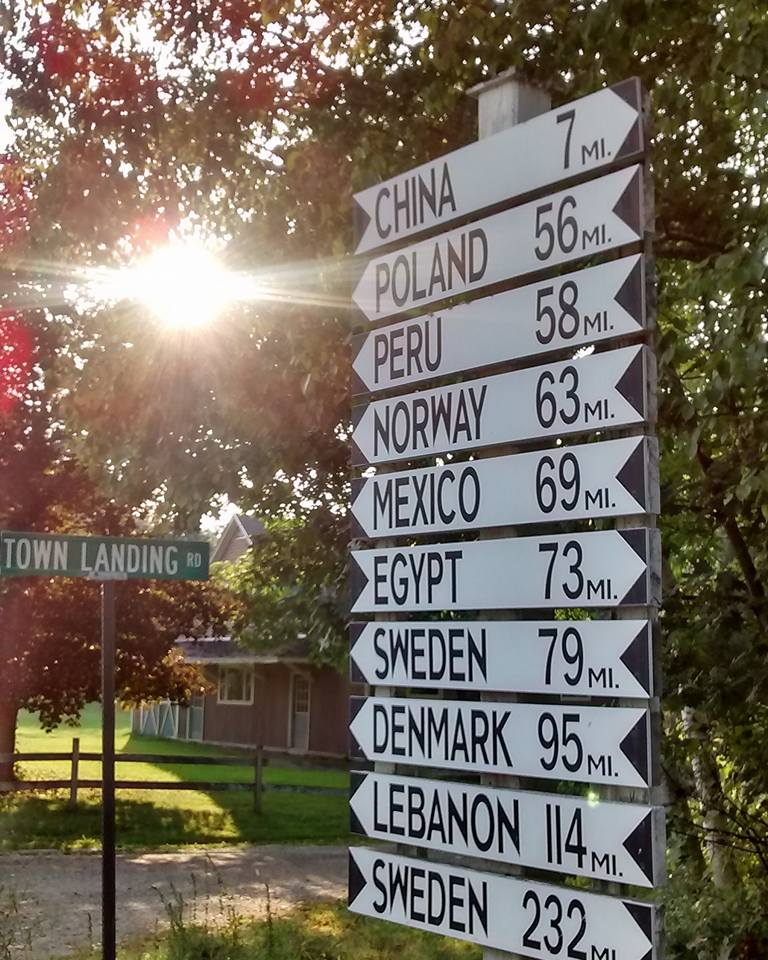
- An iconic sign in South China

- Location within Maine Location within the United States
- Coordinates: 44°23′45″N 69°34′15″W
- Country: United States
- State: Maine
- County: Kennebec
- Town: China
- Established: 1818
- Elevation: 157 ft (48 m)
- Time zone: UTC-5 (Eastern (EST))
  - Summer (DST): UTC-4 (EDT)
- ZIP code: 04358
- Area code: 207

South China is a village in the town of China in Kennebec County, Maine, United States. It is one of five villages in the town. Located between Augusta and Waterville, South China sits along the shores of its namesake, China Lake. It is an hour and a half from both Bangor and Portland. Maine State Route 3 runs through the major part of the town, leading west to Augusta and east to Belfast, and U.S. Route 202 (Lakeview Drive) connects South China with China.

== Communities ==
South China is home to Friends Camp, a Quaker summer camp which has been active for over 50 years. It is also the home of a Christian church, South China Community Church, across from the South China Library (founded in 1830). The church is open to and welcomes all practicing Christians of any denomination. Three-Mile Pond can be accessed from Route 3, a mile south of the South China Community Church. South China is also home to Maine's second largest private high school, Erskine Academy.

== Notable people ==
- Rufus Jones (1863–1948), writer, magazine editor, philosopher, Quaker theologian, historian, and college professor; the only person to have delivered two Swarthmore Lectures
- Mary Mayhew, 2018 Republican candidate for governor who currently resides in South China
- Stacy Westfall, horsewoman and inductee in National Cowgirl Hall of Fame, was raised in South China.
