= Amy Morris Homans =

American physical educator (1848–1933)

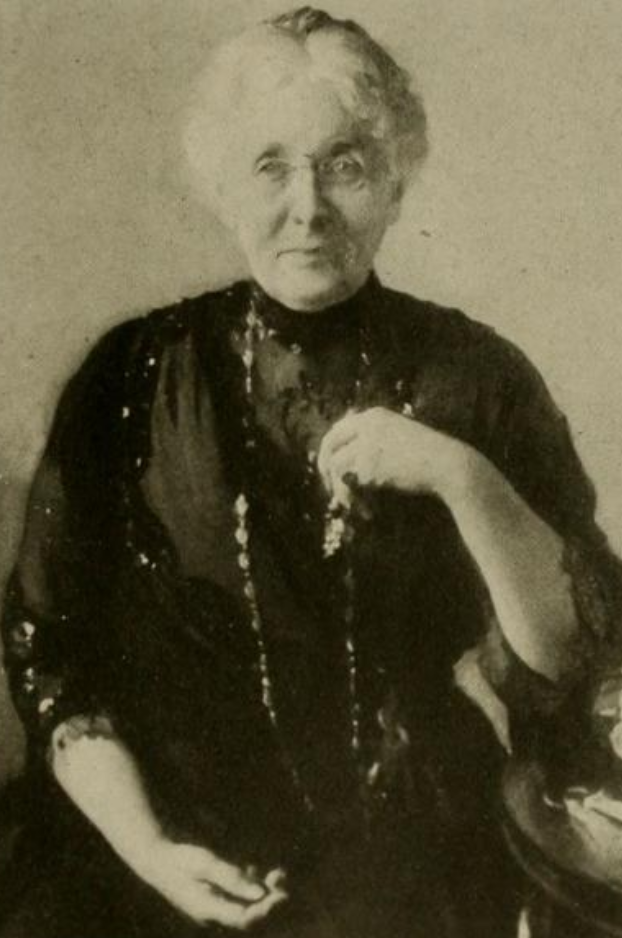
- Amy Morris Homans, from the 1915 yearbook of Wellesley College
- Born: November 15, 1848; Vassalboro, Maine
- Died: October 29, 1933 (aged 84); Wellesley, Massachusetts
- Occupation: Physical educator
- Relatives: Amy Morris Bradley (aunt)

Amy Morris Homans (November 15, 1848 – October 29, 1933) was an American physical educator. She was the director of the Boston Normal School of Gymnastics, from its founding in 1889, through its reorganization as the Department of Hygiene and Physical Education at Wellesley College, until she retired in 1918. She founded the Association of Directors of Physical Education for Women.

== Early life and education ==
Homans was born in Vassalboro, Maine, the daughter of Harrison Homans and Sarah Bliss Bradley Homans. Educator Amy Morris Bradley was her aunt. She attended Vassalboro Academy and Oakgrove Seminary.

== Career ==
Homans taught at Oakgrove Seminary, from 1867 to 1869. She went South to work with her aunt as a teacher and school principal in Wilmington, North Carolina from 1869 to 1877. In 1877, she became the executive secretary of Boston philanthropist Mary Tileston Hemenway. With Hemenway's support, Homans founded the Boston School of Household Arts in 1886, and became founding director of the Boston Normal School of Gymnastics in 1889. Her program was based on Swedish "medical gymnastics" as popularized by Pehr Henrik Ling. She retired as director in 1918, succeeded by Roxana Vivian; by that time, the school was the department of hygiene at Wellesley College. She founded the Association of Directors of Physical Education for Women in 1910, which became the National Association of Physical Education of College Women.

Homans was a vice-president of the Woman's Education Association of Boston. was elected Fellow #12 in the National Academy of Kinesiology (formerly American Academy of Physical Education), and received the American Physical Education Association's first Honor Award in 1931. Also in 1931, she received an honorary doctorate from Russell Sage College. She is recognized as "a great champion for women's pursuit of leadership in physical education and sport." Her students taught throughout the United States and organized local Homans Clubs.

== Publications ==
- "Some Problems in the Administration of a Department of Hygiene and Physical Education in a Woman's College" (1913)
- "The Field of Physical Education" (1920)

== Personal life and legacy ==
Homans died in 1933, in Wellesley, Massachusetts. The National Association for Kinesiology in Higher Education (NAKHE) awards an annual Amy Morris Homans Lectureship, established by NAKHE president Celeste Ulrich. Betty Spears published a book-length biography of Homans, Leading the Way: Amy Morris Homans and the Beginnings of Professional Education for Women (1986).
