= Edward Augustus Holyoke Hemenway =

American self-made merchant

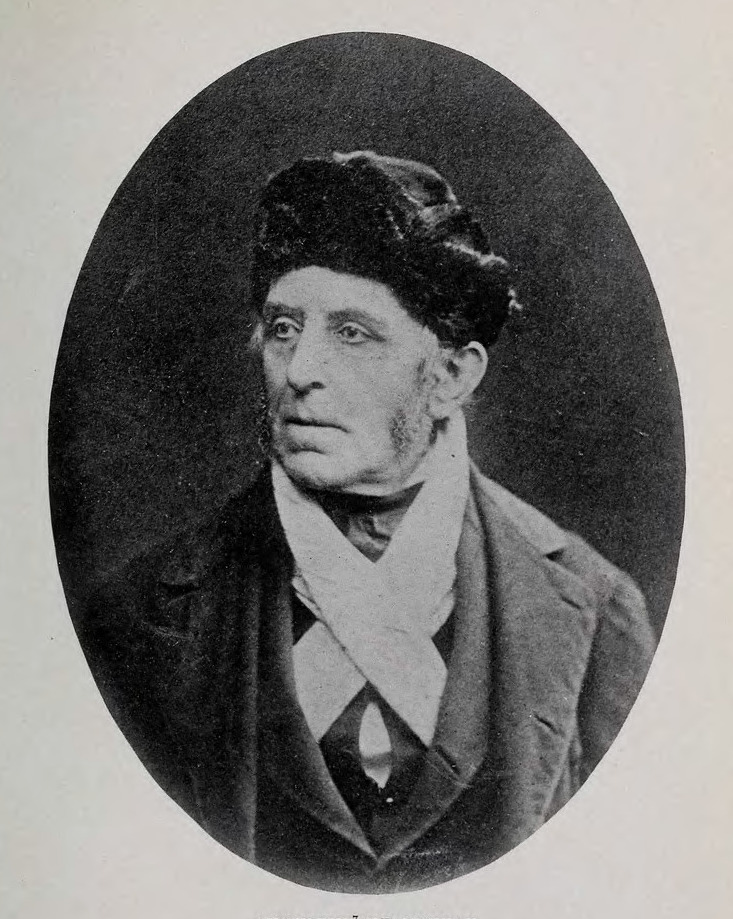
- Born: April 25, 1805; Salem, Massachusetts
- Died: June 16, 1876 (aged 71); Cuba
- Spouse: Mary Tileston Hemenway
- Children: Three daughters and one son
- Parent(s): Father - Dr. Samuel Hemenway and Mother Sarah Upton

Edward Augustus Holyoke Hemenway (April 25, 1805 – June 16, 1876) was an American self-made merchant from Boston, Massachusetts.

== Early years ==
He was born in Salem, Massachusetts, the eldest son of Dr. Samuel Hemenway (1778-1823) and Sarah Upton (1787-1865) of New England descent. His siblings included George Washington (1807-1830), Samuel Charles (1809-1867), William (1811-1874), and Charles (1818-1893). His baptismal name was Edward Augustus Holyoke Hemenway, in honor of Edward Augustus Holyoke, the eminent physician with whom his father studied. As a young man, however, Hemenway shortened his name to Augustus Hemenway, possibly a reflection of his estrangement of many years from his father, who died when Augustus was 18. He graduated from Harvard University.

== Career ==
At the age of 13, he started working in Boston as a clerk in Robinson & Parkers’ dry goods store. He went to work as a supercargo for Benjamin Bangs, a wealthy shipowner and merchant in Boston, and for a few years was his agent and partner in South American trade. Hemenway became owner of extensive silver mines in Valparaíso, and lived there for eight years. He owned a township in Washington County, Maine, where pine was cut on his own land, sawed into lumber at his own sawmill in Machias, and carried to Cuba, where he owned a sugar plantation, or to Valparaíso on his own ships, which returned to Boston with copper and nitrate of soda. He spearheaded the commercial enterprise of the US with the west coast of South America. When he went to Chile, he established his own business by 1838. He established many large silver mines, reaping huge profits. He was extremely hard working and ensured that all details of his business were personally attended to by him, including the loading of ships.

This overwork resulted in a nervous breakdown in 1860; he spent 14 years in Dr. Buel's Sanitarium in Litchfield, Connecticut recuperating. Upon his recovery in late 1873, he wrote his wife that "I have been thoroughly cured of my insane desire to turn hundreds to thousands, thousands to millions and so on "ad infinitum' and shall hope to live in future, not for myself only but for others, especially the poor and needy." He resumed his business affairs, traveling to Cuba in 1876, where he fell ill and subsequently died. At his death, he was one of the wealthiest men in America. In his will, he provided $100,000 to be distributed among corporations organized for public charity, "distributing it, as much as possible, among those most worthy, avoiding all such as make two paupers where there was but one before, and those with any appearance of sham, where the managers derive pecuniary profit from the management. . ." His widow, Mary, continued with philanthropic works, including the saving of the Old South Meeting House of Boston as an historical landmark.

== Personal life ==
On 2 June 1840, he wed Mary Tileston Hemenway (1820–1894), daughter of Thomas Tileston, one of the wealthiest merchant/mariners of New York City. Their daughters were Charlotte Augusta (b. 1841, d. 1865), Alice (d. in infancy), Edith Hemenway Eustis (1851-1904), and Amy Hemenway (1848-1911) who was married to Louis Cabot. Their son, Augustus Jr. (1853-1931), graduated from Harvard University in 1875, and was married to Harriet Lawrence, one of the founders of the Audubon Society. Edward Clarke Cabot, Louis' brother, designed a summer home for Hemenway at Manchester-by-the-Sea. Hemenway died in 1876, while on a trip to Cuba. He was a philanthropist and his wife continued this tradition after his death with large contributions to American archeology.
