= Vassalboro Community School =

School district in Maine, United States

Information
- Website: www.vcsvikings.org

Vassalboro Community School (VCS) is a school district in Vassalboro, Maine, as well as its single grade school.

Vassalboro was a part of Kennebec Valley Consolidated Schools (AOS92) until July 1, 2018.
