= Jesse Walter Fewkes =

American anthropologist (1850–1930)

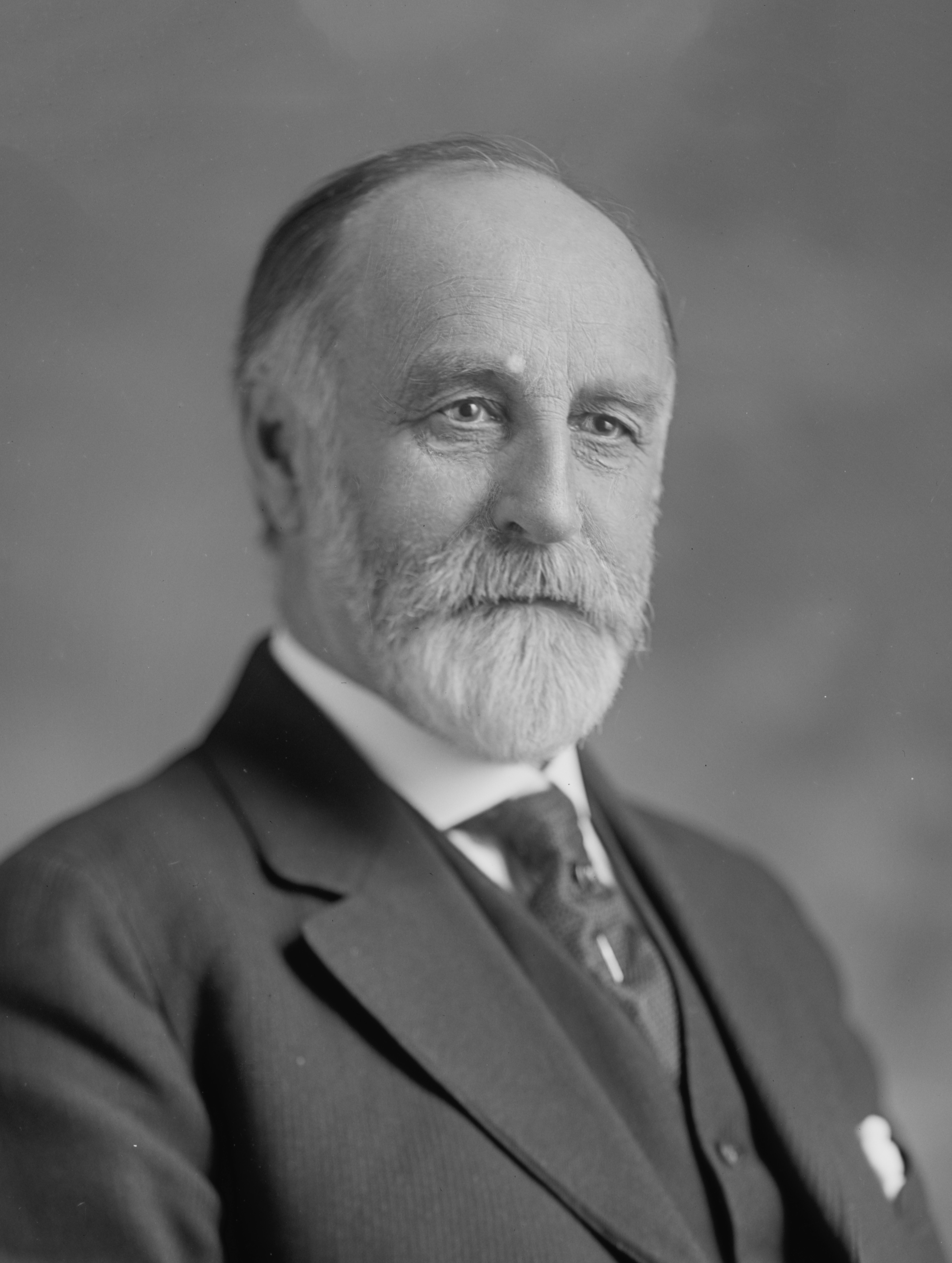
- Jesse Walter Fewkes, c. 1919
- Born: November 14, 1850; Newton, Massachusetts, U.S.
- Died: May 31, 1930 (aged 79); Forest Glen, Maryland, U.S.
- Education: Harvard University
- Spouses: Florence Gorges Eastman (m. 1883; died 1888) Harriet O. Cutler (m. 1893)
- Scientific career
- Fields: Anthropology, Archaeology, Zoology

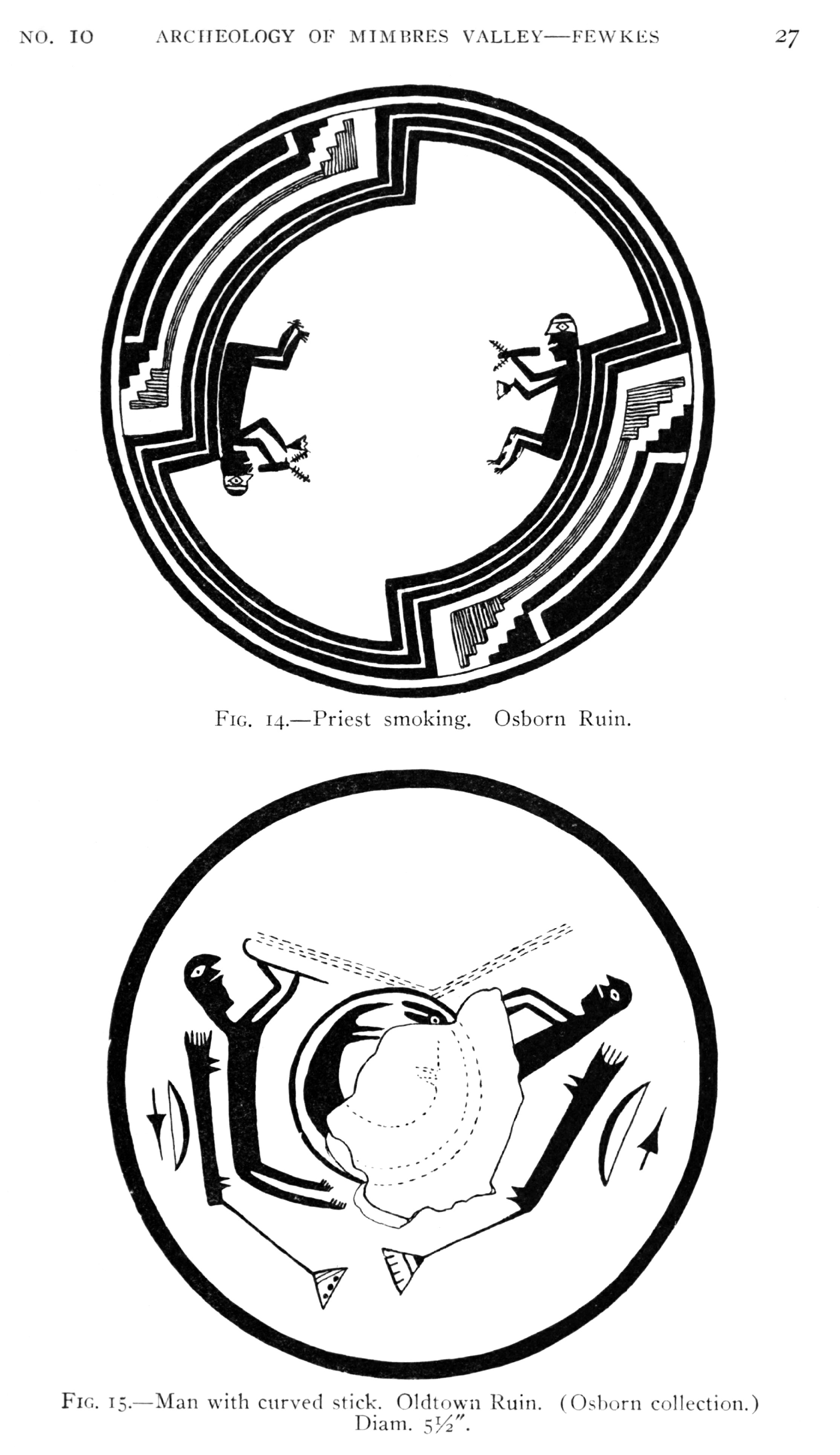
Plate from "Archaeology of the lower Mimbres valley, New Mexico" by Fewkes in 1914

Jesse Walter Fewkes (November 14, 1850 – May 31, 1930) was an American anthropologist, archaeologist, writer, and naturalist.

== Early life and education ==
Fewkes was born in Newton, Massachusetts on November 14, 1850, and initially trained as a zoologist at Harvard University. He later turned to ethnological studies of the Native American tribes in the American Southwest.

He married Florence Gorges Eastman in 1883. After Eastman's death in 1888, Fewkes went on to marry Harriet Olivia Cutler in 1893.

== Career ==
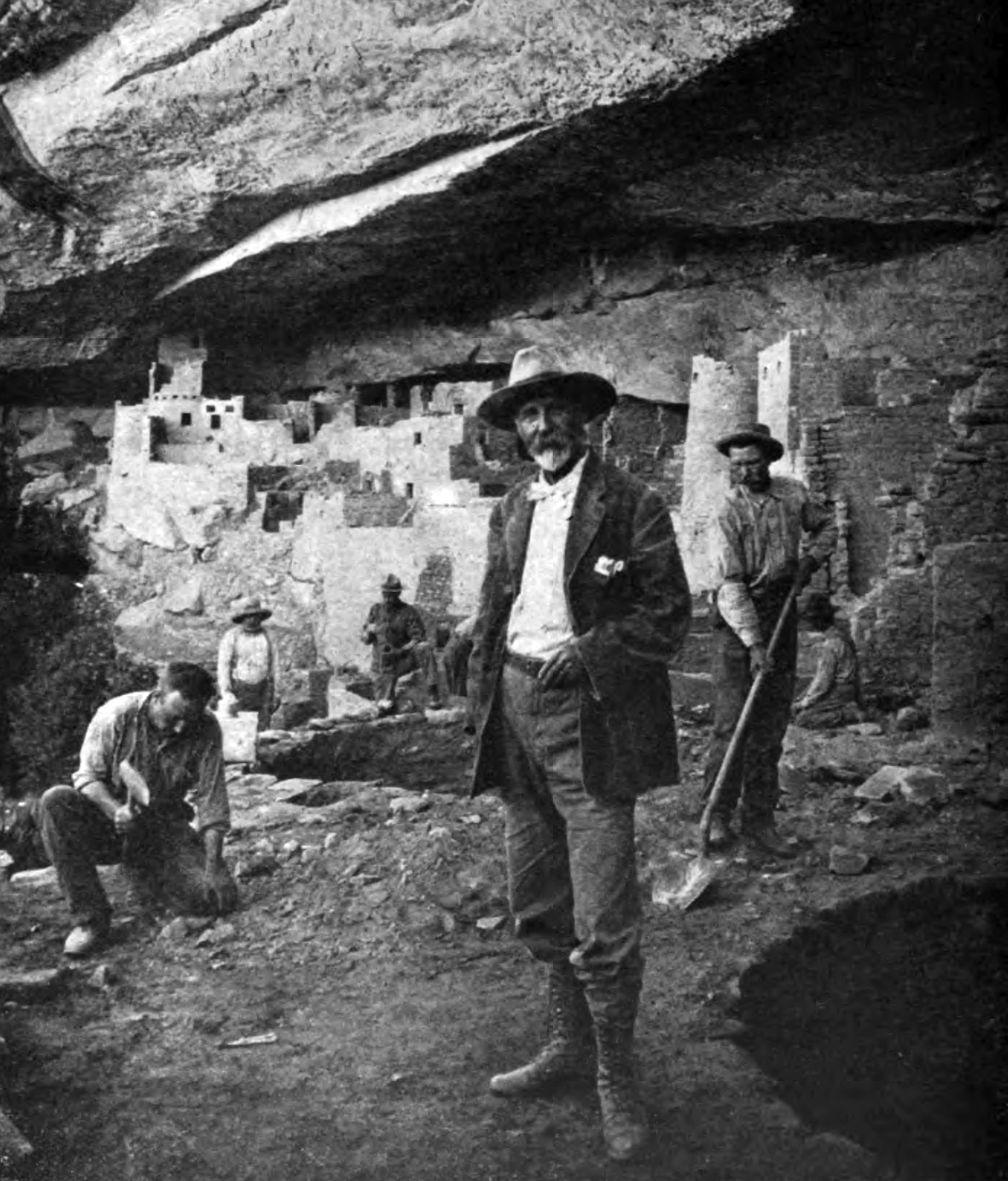
Fewkes at the cliff dwellings at Mesa Verde in Colorado, c. 1910

In 1889, with the resignation of noted ethnologist Frank Hamilton Cushing, Fewkes became leader of the Hemenway Southwestern Archaeological Expedition, named for its patron Mary Hemenway. While with this project, Fewkes documented the existing lifestyle and rituals of the Zuni and Hopi tribes. He also recorded the music and languages of the people.

Fewkes was the first man to use a phonograph to record Indigenous people for study. He first tested its use among the Passamaquoddy in present-day Maine. When he traveled to the Southwest United States with the Hemenway expedition, he used a phonograph to record music of the Zuni (1890) and Hopi (1891). Benjamin Ives Gilman used these recordings to show that the people used musical intervals unlike those in the Western tempered scale. In addition to making the recordings, Fewkes wrote historically valuable descriptions of the music and musical practice.

Fewkes surveyed the ruins of a number of cultures in the Southwest, and wrote many articles and books about them. He supervised the excavation of Casa Grande in southern Arizona, a Hohokam site, and the Mesa Verde dwellings in southern Colorado, an Ancient Pueblo site.

He particularly focused on the variants and styles of prehistoric Southwest Indian pottery, producing a number of volumes with carefully drawn illustrations. His work on the Mimbres and Sikyátki pottery styles later contributed to artisans reproducing many of these traditional forms and images. He claimed that his research influenced the designs of Hopi potter Nampeyo, though there is scholarly disagreement on this point.

In the study of the Hopi religious rituals and festivities, Fewkes compiled descriptions and drawings of the Hopi Katsinam. He also commissioned several Hopi artists, knowledgeable in the Katsina cult and with the least outside influence in their work, to produce a series of paintings of these supernatural beings of the Hopi, the Katsinam. The resulting Codex Hopi, a manuscript of all the known Hopi Katsinam, was the first permanent documentation of the ceremonial performers. It documented and preserved the Katsinam, who may otherwise have ceased to appear.

Fewkes was one of the first persons to advocate for government preservation of ancient sites in the American Southwest. By the mid-1890s, vandalism of these sites was widespread. In the American Anthropologist (August 1896), Fewkes described a large cliff dwelling called Palatki, or "Red House", situated in the Red Rock country southwest of Flagstaff, Arizona. He appealed for legislation to protect it.

If this destruction of the cliff-houses of New Mexico, Colorado, and Arizona goes on at the same rate in the next fifty years that it has in the past, these unique dwellings will be practically destroyed, and unless laws are enacted, either by states or by the general government, for their protection, at the close of the twentieth century many of the most interesting monuments of the prehistoric peoples of our Southwest will be little more than mounds of debris at the bases of the cliffs. A commercial spirit is leading to careless excavations for objects to sell, and walls are ruthlessly overthrown, buildings torn down in hope of a few dollars' gain. The proper designation of the way our antiquities are treated is vandalism. Students who follow us, when these cliff-houses have all disappeared and their instructive objects scattered by greed of traders, will wonder at our indifference and designate our negligence by its proper name. It would be wise legislation to prevent this vandalism as much as possible and good science to put all excavation of ruins in trained hands.

His research on pre-Columbian sites in Puerto Rico, Haiti, Cuba, Trinidad, and the Lesser Antilles was the basis for his 1907 book, Aborigines of Porto Rico and Neighboring Islands, an acclaimed book in early archaeology. In 1908, Spruce Tree House became the first excavation project at Mesa Verde National Park.

Fewkes joined the Smithsonian's Bureau of American Ethnology in 1895. He was selected as its director in 1918.

He died in Forest Glen, Maryland on May 31, 1930.

== Publications ==
- The Group of Tusayan Ceremonials Called Katcinas. The Smithsonian Institution; BAE Annual Report 1897 pp. 245–313.
- A Theatrical Performance at Walpi. Washington DC.: Washington Academy of Sciences Vol II, 1900. pp605–629.
- Hopi Katcinas Drawn by Native Artists. The Smithsonian Institution; BAE Annual Report 1903 pp 3–126
- The Mimbres: Art and Archaeology. Avanyu Publishing, Albuquerque, New Mexico, republished 1993. ISBN 978-0-936755-10-6.

--a reprint of three papers published by the Smithsonian Institution between 1914 and 1924.

- Hopi Snake Ceremonies; Avanyu Publishing Inc. Albuquerque, New Mexico 1986. Republication of selected works Bureau of American Ethnology Annual Report Nos. 16 and 19 for the years 1894–1895 and 1897–1898.
- Antiquities of the Mesa Verde National Park, Cliff Palace
- Antiquities of the Mesa Verde National Park: Spruce-Tree House
