= Benjamin Ives Gilman =

Secretary of the Boston Museum of Fine Arts

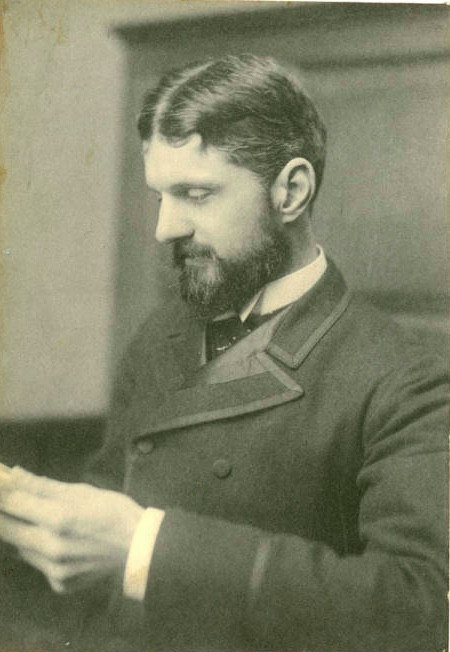
- Gilman, about 1880
- Born: February 19, 1852; New York, NY
- Died: March 18, 1933 (aged 81); Boston, Massachusetts
- Education: Williams College, Johns Hopkins University, Harvard University
- Employer(s): Museum of Fine Arts, Boston
- Known for: Museum administrator, theorist
- Spouse: Cornelia Moore Dunbar

Benjamin Ives Gilman (1852–1933) was notable as the Secretary of the Boston Museum of Fine Arts from 1893 to 1925. Beginning with the museum as a curator and librarian, he held a variety of positions during this time. As Secretary, he focused on communications and advising the Director and Board on enhancing the museum experience for visitors. He encouraged the display of original art and introduced the practice of having docents aid visitors in their engagement with art.

== Biography ==
Benjamin Ives Gilman was born in New York in 1852, the son of Winthrop Sargent Gilman and the former Abia Swift Lippincott. He attended Williams College (class of 1872) but did not graduate on account of health problems. He joined his family's banking business in New York.

After returning for graduate work to Williams, in 1880 he received a master's degree. The next year he entered the Ph.D. program at Johns Hopkins University as a philosophy student, focusing on mathematics and logic. He studied with Charles Sanders Peirce, one of the founders of modern mathematical logic. As "B.I. Gilman", he authored a paper published in Peirce's Studies in Logic (1883).

Gilman left Johns Hopkins after one year to study in Germany, and did not return to the university, citing health reasons. He became a student of William James at the Philosophy Department of Harvard University, enrolling there 1883–1885. He specialized in aesthetics, especially the aesthetics of music. Between 1890 and 1892, he taught courses in the psychology of music at Colorado College, Harvard, Princeton, and Columbia.

Gilman also undertook experimental research on expressiveness in music and studied "primitive music," as the West then defined it. Together with ethnologist Jesse Walter Fewkes of the Hemenway Southwestern Archaeological Expedition, he made some of the first recordings and analyses of recordings of Native American music. He demonstrated that the people used musical intervals unlike those in the Western tempered scale.

Gilman also wrote about Chinese music. He visited New York's Chinatown to make recordings of their music. In addition, his recordings of music from Fijian, Samoan, Uvean, Javanese, Turkish and other performers at the World's Columbian Exposition of 1893 are held by the Library of Congress.

In 1892 Gilman became an instructor in psychology at Clark University. There he taught a course on the 'Psychology of Pain and Pleasure'.

=== Museum of Fine Arts ===
In 1893 Gilman was hired as Curator and Librarian at the Museum of Fine Arts, Boston, where he would work for the remainder of his career. He held a variety of titles, including curator (1893-1894?); Librarian (1893-1904); Assistant Director, (1901–1903); and Temporary Director (1907). For almost the entire time, he also served as Secretary (1894-1925), with responsibility for publications and advising the Director and the Board.

In his remarks to the board and in his publications, Gilman urged that art museums display original masterpieces of art, not reproductions, and make it easy for the visitor to engage with them; to consider the visitor's comfort (he coined the term "museum fatigue"); and to focus on aesthetics, not on art history. He also introduced the use of museum docents, coining that word. His major work, Museum Ideals of Purpose and Method (1918), is an extended argument for this concept of the museum.

== Publications ==
He was the author of:

- "Operations in Relative Number with Applications to the Theory of Probabilities", Studies in Logic (1883), C. S. Peirce, ed., pp. 107–125. Google Books Eprint. Internet Archive Eprint.
- Manual of Italian Renaissance Sculpture (1904). Google Books Eprint. Internet Archive Eprint.
- Hopi Songs (1908). Google Books Eprint. A Traditional Music Library Eprint (This website says "circa 1891"; that is when Gilman began his research on the subject). Internet Archive Eprint.
- Museum Ideals of Purpose and Method (1918). Google Books Eprint. Internet Archive Eprints.
- "The Paradox of the Syllogism Solved by Spatial Construction", Mind, New Series, v. 32, n. 125 (Jan., 1923), pp. 38–49 (12 pages). JSTOR Eprint.

as well as many other articles on a wide range of philosophical, mathematical, political, and museological topics.
