= China, Maine =

Settlement in the United States

- Town
- Seal Logo

- Location in Kennebec County and the state of Maine.
- Coordinates: 44°24′14″N 69°30′15″W
- Country: United States
- State: Maine
- County: Kennebec
- Villages: China Village; Dirigo Corner; Palermo (part); South China; Weeks Mills

Area
  - Total: 56.86 sq mi (147.27 km^{2})
  - Land: 49.88 sq mi (129.19 km^{2})
  - Water: 6.98 sq mi (18.08 km^{2})
- Elevation: 285 ft (87 m)

Population (2020)
  - Total: 4,408
  - Density: 88/sq mi (34.1/km^{2})
- Time zone: UTC-5 (Eastern (EST))
  - Summer (DST): UTC-4 (EDT)
- ZIP Codes: 04358 (South China); 04926 (China Village)
- Area code: 207
- FIPS code: 23-12735
- GNIS feature ID: 582410
- Website: chinamaine.org

China is a town in Kennebec County, Maine, United States. The population was 4,408 at the 2020 census. China is included in the Augusta, Maine, micropolitan NECTA.

== Geography ==
According to the United States Census Bureau, the town has a total area of 56.86 square miles (147.27 km^{2}), of which 49.88 square miles (129.19 km^{2}) is land and 6.98 square miles (18.08 km^{2}) is water. Bodies of water in the town include China Lake (3939 acres), Three Mile Pond (1174 acres), and Branch Pond (310 acres).

China is bordered on the northwest by Winslow, the northeast by Albion, on the east by Palermo, on the south by Windsor, and on the west by Vassalboro. It is served by U.S. Route 202, State Routes 32, 9 and 3.

=== China Lake ===
China Lake is a lake in the town. China Lake has two large basins connected by a narrow neck. The elongated eastern basin with an average depth of less than 30 feet (9.1 m) is entirely within the town of China, and has an irregular shoreline developed with residences and seasonal cottages.

=== Climate ===
This climatic region is typified by large seasonal temperature differences, with warm to hot (and often humid) summers and cold (sometimes severely cold) winters. According to the Köppen Climate Classification system, China has a humid continental climate, abbreviated "Dfb" on climate maps.

== History ==
In 1774, a family named Clark settled in the area and established Jones' Plantation. In 1796, Jones' Plantation was incorporated as Harlem. The area's name was provided by Massachusetts legislative member Japheth Coombs Washburn.

On June 25, 1818, the Town of China was incorporated by combining Harlem, Fairfax (Albion), and Winslow.

The name of the town was chosen by Japheth Washburn. He wanted to call the town Bloomville, but people from the town of Bloomfield objected, saying that the similarity of names could cause confusion. Washburn settled on the name China, because it was the name of one of his favorite hymns. This widely sung hymn was written by Timothy Swan of Northfield, Massachusetts in 1790 and was published in Swan's "New England Harmony" in 1801.

China had a fourth district located at the height of land between Palermo and Albion, part of which is located today in what is known as Thurston Park. It was in this area that numerous families of African-American descent settled. Their history, spanning roughly 1790 to 1860, can be itemized in the Maine state archives. Some cemetery plots can still be located with a guide, including a large obelisk stone in memory of "Tolbot" on a high wooded ridge which was also the location of an early shingle mill. Other burial and foundation sites are also present and can best be located by using early census maps and their indicators.

It is theorized that these families migrated here because it represented a safe area which slave catchers would not approach as China and several other towns were "Quaker" towns which would not tolerate slave catchers, no matter what either federal Fugitive Slave Act demanded.

== Localities ==
The town of China contains five villages: China Village, South China, China, Weeks Mills, and Branch Mills.

== Government ==
At a yearly town meeting citizens elect five Town Selectmen, one of whom is chosen as chairman. The citizens also outline the budget for the coming year. The Selectmen appoint a Town Manager who oversees the daily operation of the town.

== Education ==
China is part of Regional School Unit 18 (China, Rome, Belgrade, Sidney and Oakland). China students are given the choice of attending any public high school including nearby schools in Winslow, Waterville, Augusta and Oakland. There is also a private high school, Erskine Academy, in South China.

== Demographics ==
Historical population
Census	Pop.	Note	%±
1800	587		—
1810	939		60.0%
1820	894		−4.8%
1830	2,233		149.8%
1840	2,675		19.8%
1850	2,769		3.5%
1860	2,719		−1.8%
1870	2,118		−22.1%
1880	1,769		−16.5%
1890	1,423		−19.6%
1900	1,380		−3.0%
1910	1,297		−6.0%
1920	1,257		−3.1%
1930	1,163		−7.5%
1940	1,252		7.7%
1950	1,375		9.8%
1960	1,561		13.5%
1970	1,850		18.5%
1980	2,918		57.7%
1990	3,713		27.2%
2000	4,106		10.6%
2010	4,328		5.4%
2020	4,408		1.8%
U.S. Decennial Census

=== 2000 census ===
As of the census of 2000, there were 4,106 people, 1,549 households, and 1,175 families living in the town. The population density was 82.4 inhabitants per square mile (31.8/km^{2}). There were 2,029 housing units at an average density of 40.7 per square mile (15.7/km^{2}). The racial makeup of the town was 97.98% White, 0.15% African American, 0.46% Native American, 0.39% Asian, 0.02% Pacific Islander, 0.05% from other races, and 0.95% from two or more races. Hispanic or Latino of any race were 0.63% of the population.

There were 1,549 households, out of which 37.8% had children under the age of 18 living with them, 62.1% were married couples living together, 9.2% had a female householder with no husband present, and 24.1% were non-families. 17.6% of all households were made up of individuals, and 5.9% had someone living alone who was 65 years of age or older. The average household size was 2.65 and the average family size was 2.99.

In the town, the population was spread out, with 27.7% under the age of 18, 5.9% from 18 to 24, 30.7% from 25 to 44, 26.3% from 45 to 64, and 9.4% who were 65 years of age or older. The median age was 37 years. For every 100 females there were 100.8 males. For every 100 females age 18 and over, there were 98.0 males.

The median income for a household in the town was $41,250, and the median income for a family was $42,768. Males had a median income of $31,802 versus $23,371 for females. The per capita income for the town was $19,262. About 2.1% of families and 3.7% of the population were below the poverty line, including 1.5% of those under age 18 and 7.0% of those age 65 or over.

=== 2010 census ===
As of the census of 2010, there were 4,328 people, 1,718 households, and 1,234 families living in the town. The population density was 86.8 inhabitants per square mile (33.5/km^{2}). There were 2,316 housing units at an average density of 46.4 per square mile (17.9/km^{2}). The racial makeup of the town was 97.1% White, 0.3% African American, 0.5% Native American, 0.4% Asian, 0.2% from other races, and 1.4% from two or more races. Hispanic or Latino of any race were 0.9% of the population.

There were 1,718 households, of which 32.4% had children under the age of 18 living with them, 57.2% were married couples living together, 9.3% had a female householder with no husband present, 5.3% had a male householder with no wife present, and 28.2% were non-families. 22.0% of all households were made up of individuals, and 6.3% had someone living alone who was 65 years of age or older. The average household size was 2.52 and the average family size was 2.91.

The median age in the town was 42.1 years. 23.6% of residents were under the age of 18; 6.9% were between the ages of 18 and 24; 24.3% were from 25 to 44; 33.7% were from 45 to 64; and 11.5% were 65 years of age or older. The gender makeup of the town was 49.8% male and 50.2% female.

== Notable people ==
- Rufus Jones, Quaker theologian
- Brendan Kehoe, author
- Mary Mayhew, lobbyist and politician
- Laroy S. Starrett, inventor
