= American Alliance of Museums =

American non-profit association

- Abbreviation: AAM
- Founded: 1906
- Founded at: Washington, D.C., U.S.
- Type: Non-profit association
- Tax ID no.: 53-0205889
- Purpose: Museums, including professionals and volunteers
- Location: 2451 Crystal Drive, Suite 1005, Arlington County, Virginia 22202
- Website: aam-us.org
- Formerly called: American Association of Museums

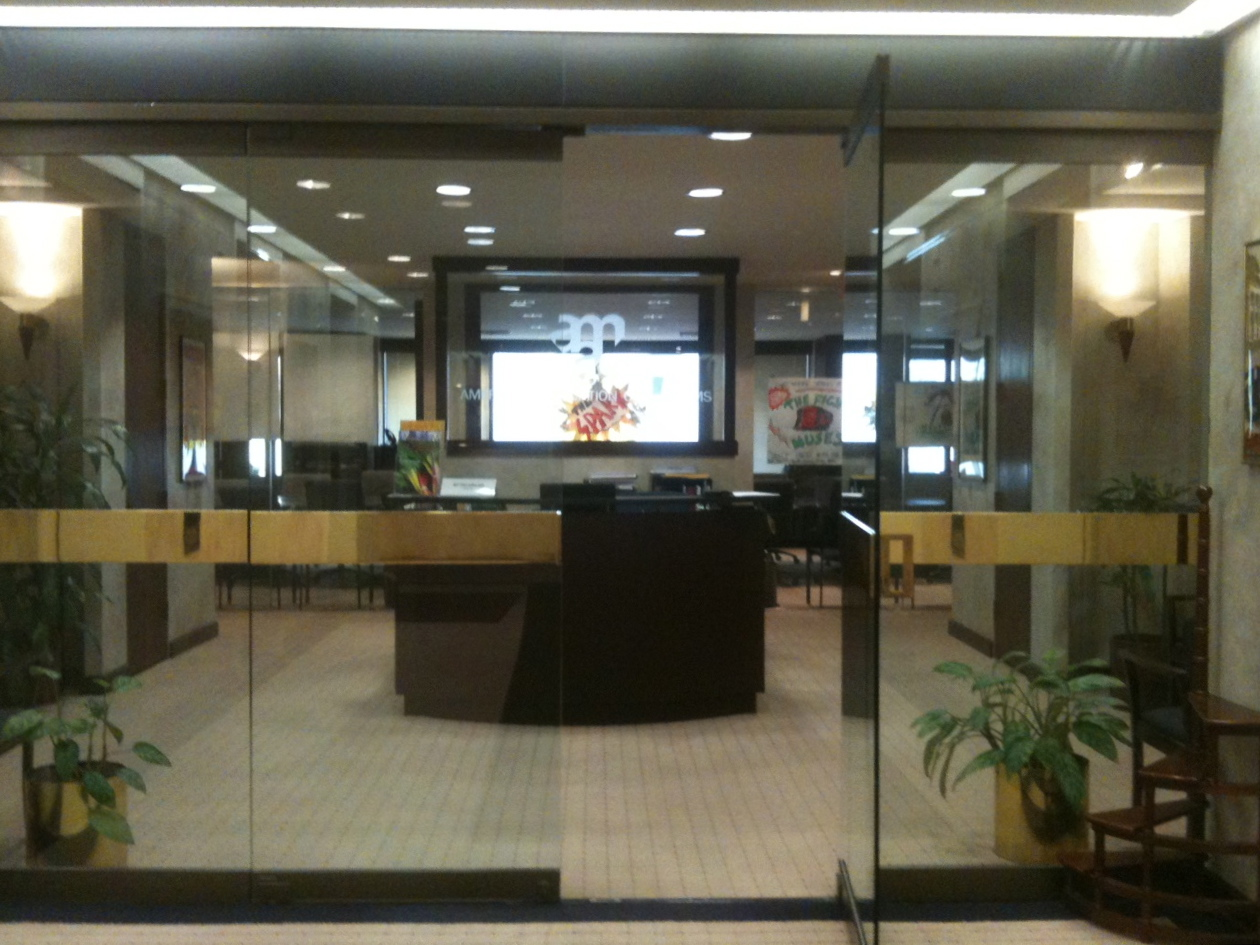
The initial AAM headquarters in Washington, D.C.; it is now headquartered in Arlington County, Virginia

The American Alliance of Museums (AAM), formerly the American Association of Museums, is an American non-profit association whose goal is to bring museums together. Founded in 1906, the organization advocates for museums and provides "museum professionals with the resources, knowledge, inspiration, and connections they need to move the field forward."

AAM represents the scope of museums, professionals, and nonpaid staff who work for and with museums. AAM represents more than 25,000 individual museum professionals and volunteers, 4,000 institutions, and 150 corporate members. Individual members include directors, curators, registrars, educators, exhibit designers, public relations officers, development officers, security managers, trustees, and volunteers.

Museums represented by the members include art, history, science, military, maritime, and youth museums, as well as public aquariums, zoos, botanical gardens, arboretums, historic sites, and science and technology centers.

At the 2014 American Alliance of Museums conference, the Institute of Museum and Library Services announced there are now at least 35,000 museums in the US.

== History ==
An informal meeting was held at the National Museum in Washington, D.C., on December 21, 1905, for the "purpose of discussing the advisability of endeavoring to establish an association of the museums of America." Major events in the history of the Alliance include:

- 1906: Founding
- 1911: Directory of North and South American museums published
- 1923: Headquarters established in the tower of the Smithsonian Castle in Washington, D.C.
- 1925: Code of Ethics for Museum Workers adopted
- 1925: $2,500 grant from the Carnegie Corporation for research on museum fatigue
- 1961: Museum directory published (4,600 institutions)
- 1964: Museums included in the National Arts and Cultural Development Act
- 1966: National Museum Act passed
- 1968: Belmont Report recommends developing an accreditation program to help support museums
- 1969: Accreditation program created on the recommendation of a committee chaired by Holman J. Swinney
- 1971: The Public Museum of Grand Rapids and fifteen additional museums are the first accredited
- 1976: New constitution adopted
- 1980: Museum Assessment Program (MAP) created on the recommendation of a committee chaired by E. Alvin Gearhardt, with MAP supported through a cooperative agreement with IMS, the Institute of Museum Services (later renamed IMLS, the Institute of Museum and Library Services)
- 2003: Launch of the Nazi-Era Provenance Internet Portal (NEPIP)
- 2006: Year of the Museum – 100th anniversary of AAM
- 2009: First Comprehensive Strategic Plan "The Spark" adopted
- 2012: Name changed to "American Alliance of Museums"

== Museum (magazine) ==
The Alliance publishes Museum, a bimonthly membership magazine covering the issues and trends facing the museum field. The publication began in 1924 as Museum News and was given its current title in 2008. Issued six times a year, each 48-page issue is built around an overarching theme addressed by four or five feature articles together with an opinion column titled "Point of View".

In November 2017, the Alliance released a special issue, Museum 2040, written as if it were published in the year 2040, to mark the tenth anniversary of its Center for the Future of Museums.

== See also ==
- Association of Art Museum Directors
- National Education Association
- International Council of Museums
- Category:Institutions accredited by the American Alliance of Museums
