= Museum fatigue =

State of fatigue caused by museum exhibits

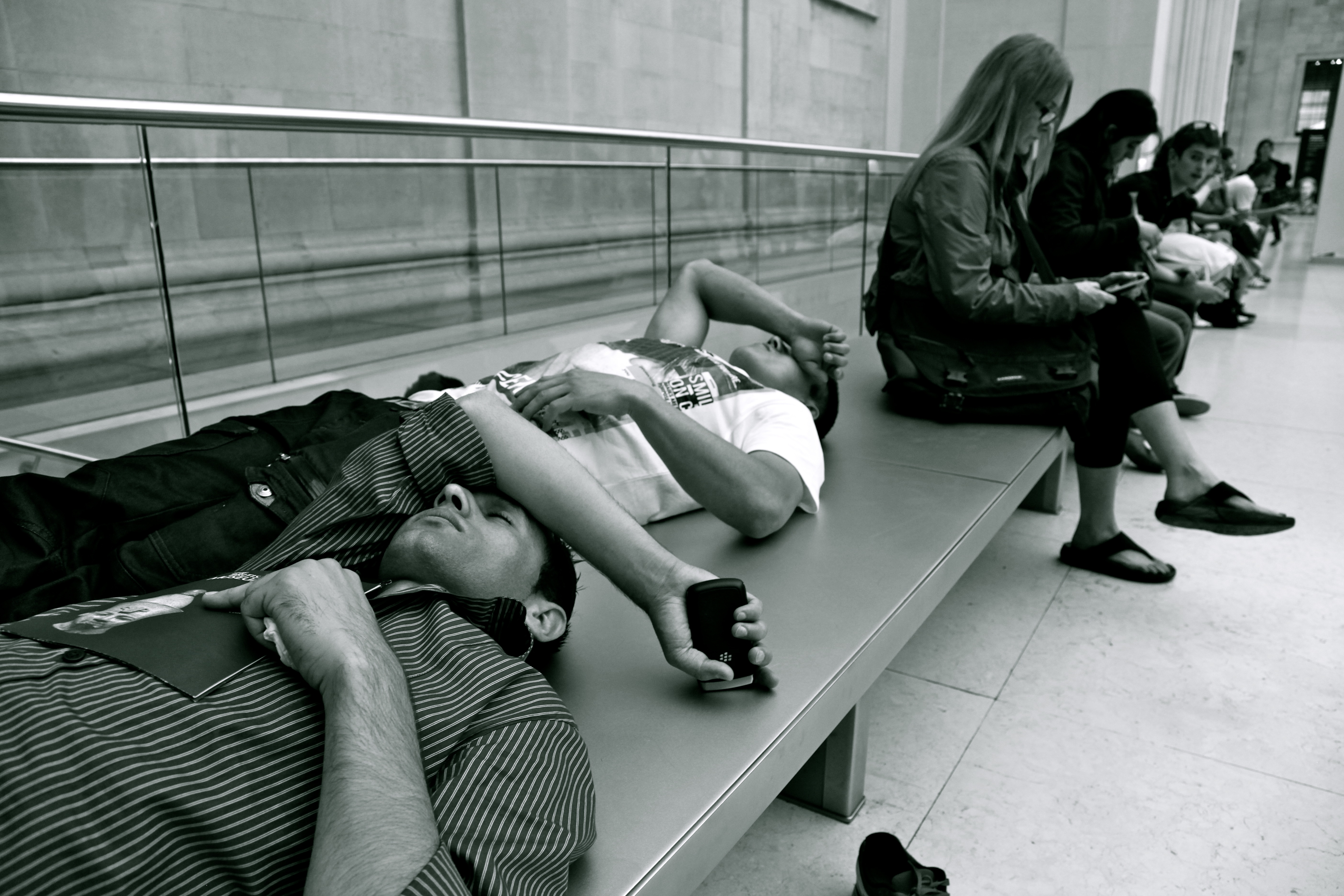
Visitors resting outside of exhibition space at the British Museum

Museum fatigue is a state of physical or mental fatigue caused by the experience of exhibits in museums and similar cultural institutions. The collection of phenomena that characterize museum fatigue was first described in 1916, and has since received widespread attention in popular and scientific contexts.

The first known description of museum fatigue was made by Benjamin Ives Gilman in the January 1916 edition of The Scientific Monthly. Gilman mainly focused on the effects of museum fatigue on how the viewing displays are placed. Gilman went on to say that the way the displays were presented caused museum fatigue. In other later studies, Edward Robinson in 1928 spoke more about museum fatigue, specifically of four museums that showed a lot of characteristics of museum fatigue because of how the displays were placed. Arthur Melton provided more proof for Robinson by observing that visitors' interest in the displays decreased as the number of displays increased.

In a more recent study of the phenomenon, Falk, Koran, Dierking, and Dreblow studied museum fatigue at the Florida Museum of Natural History in 1985. While observing visitors they noticed a pattern of high interest in anything in the museum for about 30 minutes and then a decrease in interest. In 1997–1998, Beverly Serrell in her research determined that in less than 20 minutes people became apathetic towards the museum. Museum fatigue has also been applied in zoos to see if they had the same effect. In one study in 1986, Bitgood, Patterson, and Benefeld observed the reptile house of the Birmingham Zoo. While observing they noticed that the pattern was different from museum fatigue.

== Factors ==
In a 2009 issue of Visitor Studies, Bitgood wrote that possible explanatory concepts for museum fatigue include exhaustion, satiation from repeated exposure to similar exhibits, stress, information overload, object competition from the simultaneous presentation of multiple stimuli, limited attention capacity, and the decision-making process. These general causes seem to be supported by other researchers.

=== Exhaustion ===
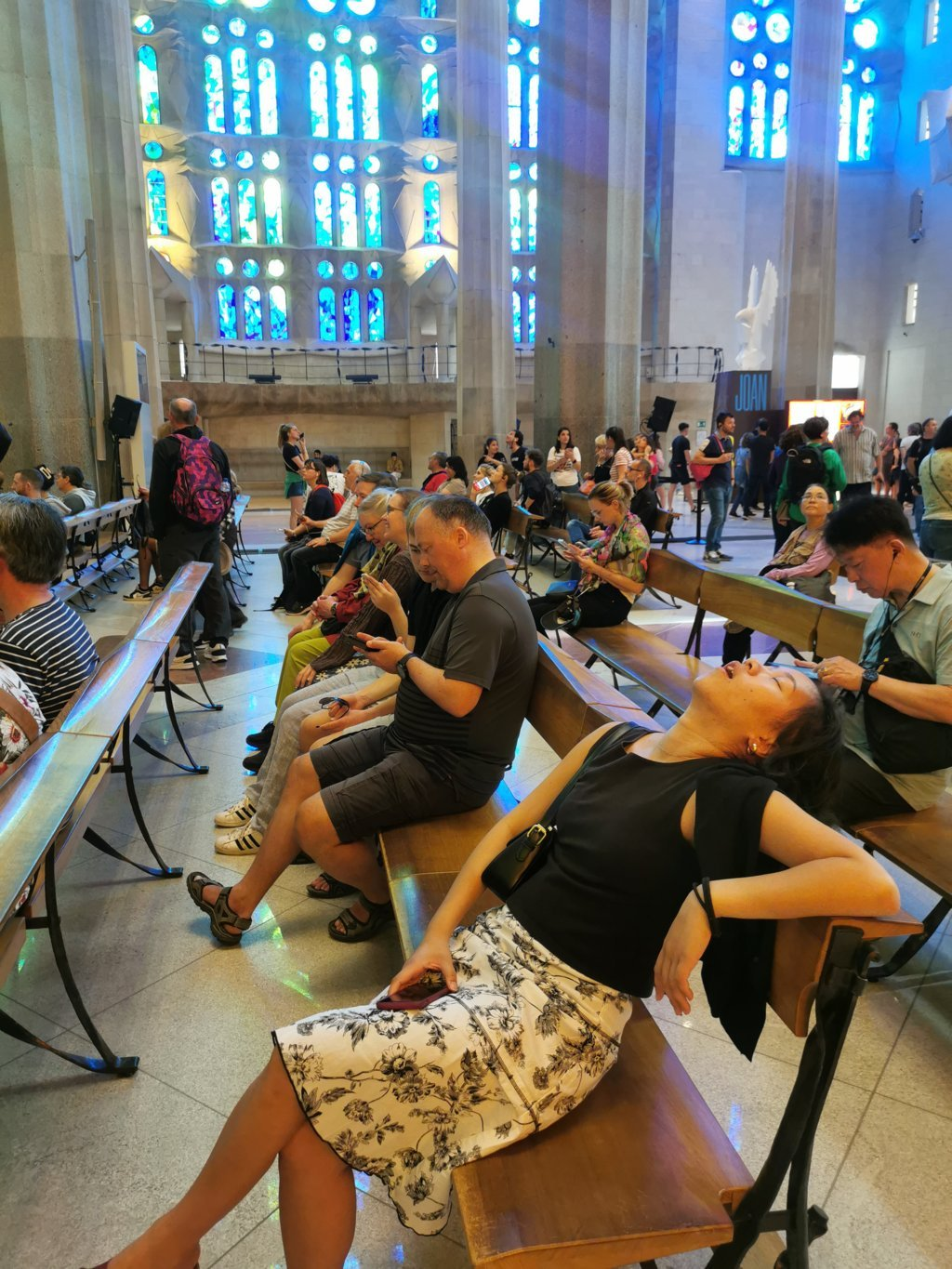
Exhausted visitor at Sagrada Família

Exhaustion or fatigue can be further divided into physical and mental fatigue. Physical fatigue is caused by walking for extended periods of time or attempting to view poorly placed exhibits or labels. This aspect played a significant role in the first description of museum fatigue by Gilman. Mental fatigue comes from a prolonged period of remaining highly attentive to the exhibits. However, the importance of both types of exhaustion in the concept of museum fatigue has been questioned due to the observance of this phenomenon even during shorter visits. Additionally, Bitgood states that since it is in the best interest of the visitors to ensure they experience as little fatigue as possible, they take effective steps to reduce this state. These include not reading long texts, keeping to a designated path, taking breaks and exiting the museum before they become exhausted.

=== Satiation ===
Satiation is often cited as an important component of museum fatigue. It occurs when a visitor views a number of monotonous objects after each other and can be observed as a decline in attention directed towards exhibited objects accompanied by a decline in enjoyment. Camarero & Garrido found in 2018 that visitors who follow a self-regulated path seem to achieve satiation later than those who follow an ordered path. These visitors also show greater satisfaction with their visit. Similarly, those who do not have prior expectations of what they will see in the museum also experience delays of satiation.

=== Object competition ===
Object competition is characterized by a number of stimuli presented concurrently resulting in a decline in attention. Due to the distinction between concurrent and serial viewing, object competition is clearly separate from museum fatigue. The two are connected via satiation and choice. An explanation proposed by Melton in 1935, dubbed the competition-distraction hypothesis suggests that the stimuli compete with each other for attention and so increased object density leads to decreased attention for separate objects. An alternative explanation centers choice and comes from the attention-value model presented by Bitgood in 2010. This suggests that visitors' attention is guided by their sense of value of different exhibits. Value is given as a ratio of perceived utility (whether an object seems interesting or familiar) and cost (of time and effort), so when presented with multiple stimuli visitors will attend to the ones with higher utility or lower cost.

=== Limited attention capacity ===
Limited attention capacity indicates that a visitor has a finite amount of attention available which they have to allocate between the exhibits they attend to. Therefore, as the amount of exhibits attended to increases, the amount of attention is likely to decrease. The attention capacity is also prone to decreases from other sources, such as distractions by loud noises or flashing lights or conversation with other members of the visitor's group.

=== Decision-making process ===
The decision-making process of visitors changes as their visit in the museum progresses. They become more discriminatory in their viewing, deciding to attend only to particular exhibits. This factor is likely to be interacting with other factors such as physical fatigue, a decrease in attention capacity or satiation.

Poor design of the museum can also contribute to museum fatigue, mostly due to the enhancement of the above-mentioned factors. If visitors encounter an especially poorly designed museum or exhibit, they will refuse to take in any information from it, presumably to avoid museum fatigue. As can be seen these factors do not act in isolation but are tight-knit and sometimes difficult to tease apart due to the interactions between them.

== Effects on learning ==
Since attention is a predisposition to learning, museum fatigue can have profound effects on the role of museums as educational facilities. Falk and Dierking proposed the Contextual Model of Learning (CML) which suggests the museum experience and the meaning-making process from it occur at the intersection of three contexts:

1. The Personal Context
2. The Sociocultural Context
3. The Physical Context

The Personal Context entails previous experience with museums in general as well as the particular museum, the visitor's personal characteristics, interests, knowledge and motivations for visiting the museum. The Sociocultural Context encapsulates the beliefs, customs and shared thought processes of the visitor's culture as well as those of the person constructing the exhibition and the social interactions that the visitor experiences within the museum. The Physical Context captures the architecture of the building, the objects inside, the design of the exhibition and other sensory inputs. These contexts are not strictly separate but instead interact with each other.

In a 2018 study, Kim, Dillon & Song applied the CLM to results of surveys regarding student learning in science centres and found that pre-existing scientific knowledge and inadequate level of exhibits were some of the most important determinants of museum fatigue in students. Additionally, social factors such as interactions with other visitors and the group with which the student visited the museum also influenced learning.

== Mitigators ==
One way that museums try to combat museum fatigue is by providing adequate seating in the galleries. According to the American Alliance of Museums blog, "Back in 1975, Boston's Museum of Fine Arts started an initiative called 'Please Be Seated,' where the institution commissioned contemporary furniture makers to design gallery seating. The benches were simultaneously works of art and utilitarian objects. Make benches part of the programmatic requirements for new exhibitions, in all types of museums. Design them into the exhibition floor plan, and commit to keeping them there, even when the desire to add more artifacts or content puts them on the chopping block."

Other opportunities for visitors to take breaks, such as museum shops or cafés also help combat physical fatigue. Clear, well-placed labels can help combat both physical and mental fatigue. Variation in the type of objects exhibited and incorporation of interactive experiences have been shown to mitigate the effects of satiation on visitors. Multiple factors of museum fatigue, such as object competition, limited attention capacity or the decision-making process can be alleviated by lower object density and the limitation of distractions, especially in the form of loud noises or flashing lights. A clear arrangement of exhibits which conduces sequential rather than parallel searching in visitors also aids in relieving the unnecessary cognitive demands placed on them. However, enough freedom needs to be left for visitors to select their own path. Handouts or guides seem to act as a mitigator of museum fatigue, although the design of the guide appears to have a significant effect on its effectiveness. If guides prove to be too effortful for visitors, their usage might drop and any of their potential benefits will remain untapped.

== Further research ==
Further research is required in this area in order to be able to effectively distinguish the causes and effects of museum fatigue. With the onset of modern technologies, novel ways of studying visitor behavior are emerging, such as through phone data or automatic tracking systems, which could bring us closer to understanding this complex phenomenon.
