= East Vassalboro, Maine =

- Village
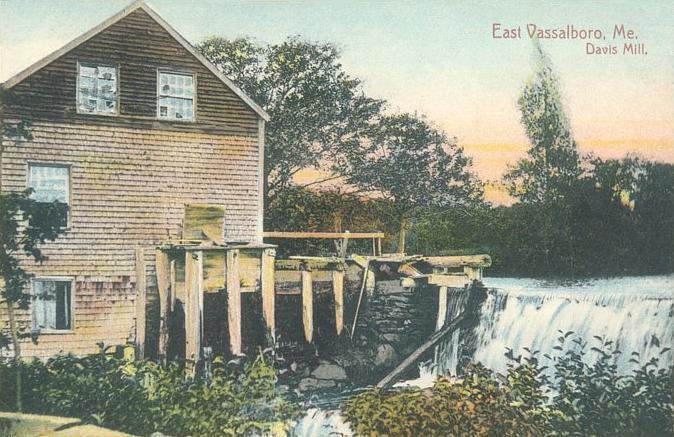
- Davis Mill in East Vassalboro, in 1910

- Location within Maine Location within the United States
- Coordinates: 44°26′52″N 69°36′21″W
- Country: United States
- State: Maine
- County: Kennebec
- Town: Vassalboro
- Elevation: 190 ft (58 m)
- Time zone: UTC-5 (Eastern (EST))
  - Summer (DST): UTC-4 (EDT)
- ZIP code: 04935
- Area code: 207
- GNIS feature ID: 565698

East Vassalboro is an unincorporated village in the town of Vassalboro, Kennebec County, Maine, United States. The community is located along Maine State Route 32, 7.3 miles (11.7 km) south of Waterville. East Vassalboro has a post office, with ZIP code 04935.

== Notable people ==
- Amy Morris Bradley (1823-1904), educator who established the first English school in Central America
- Harold C. Marden (1900–1994), lawyer and judge who served as a justice of the Maine Supreme Judicial Court
