= North Vassalboro, Maine =

- Village
- Location within Maine Location within the United States
- Coordinates: 44°29′10″N 69°37′21″W
- Country: United States
- State: Maine
- County: Kennebec
- Town: Vassalboro
- Elevation: 157 ft (48 m)
- Time zone: UTC-5 (Eastern (EST))
  - Summer (DST): UTC-4 (EDT)
- ZIP code: 04962
- Area code: 207
- GNIS feature ID: 572421

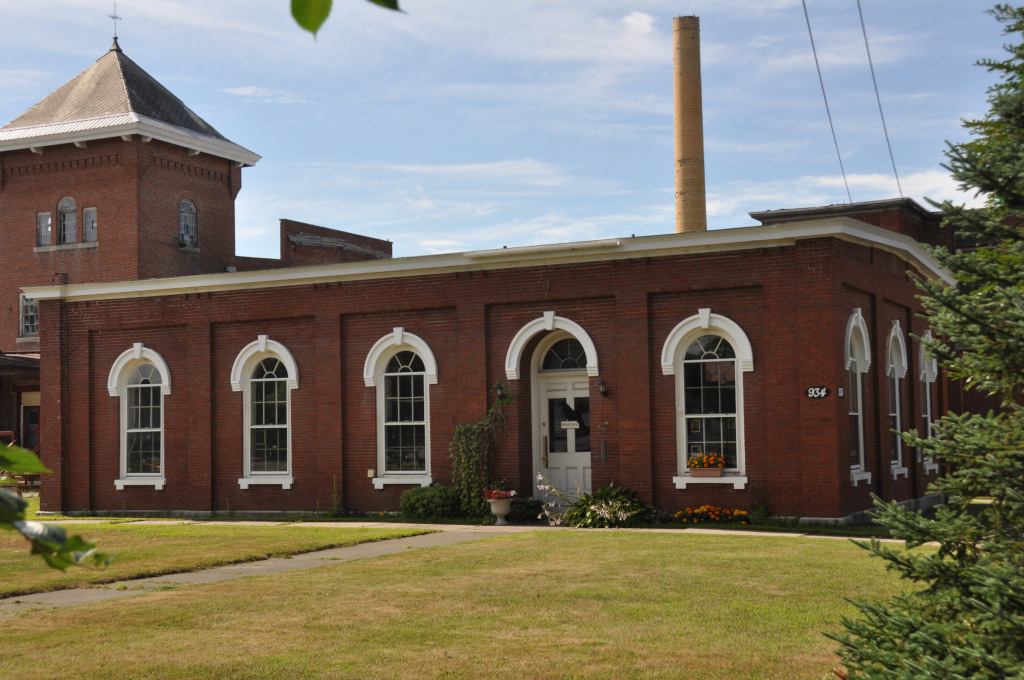
Vassalboro Mill, North Vassalboro, Maine

North Vassalboro is an unincorporated village in the town of Vassalboro, Kennebec County, Maine, United States. The community is located on Maine State Route 32, 4.5 miles (7.2 km) south of Waterville. North Vassalboro has a post office, with ZIP code 04962, which opened on March 22, 1828.
