= Hemenway Southwestern Archaeological Expedition =

Archaeological expedition in the American Southwest

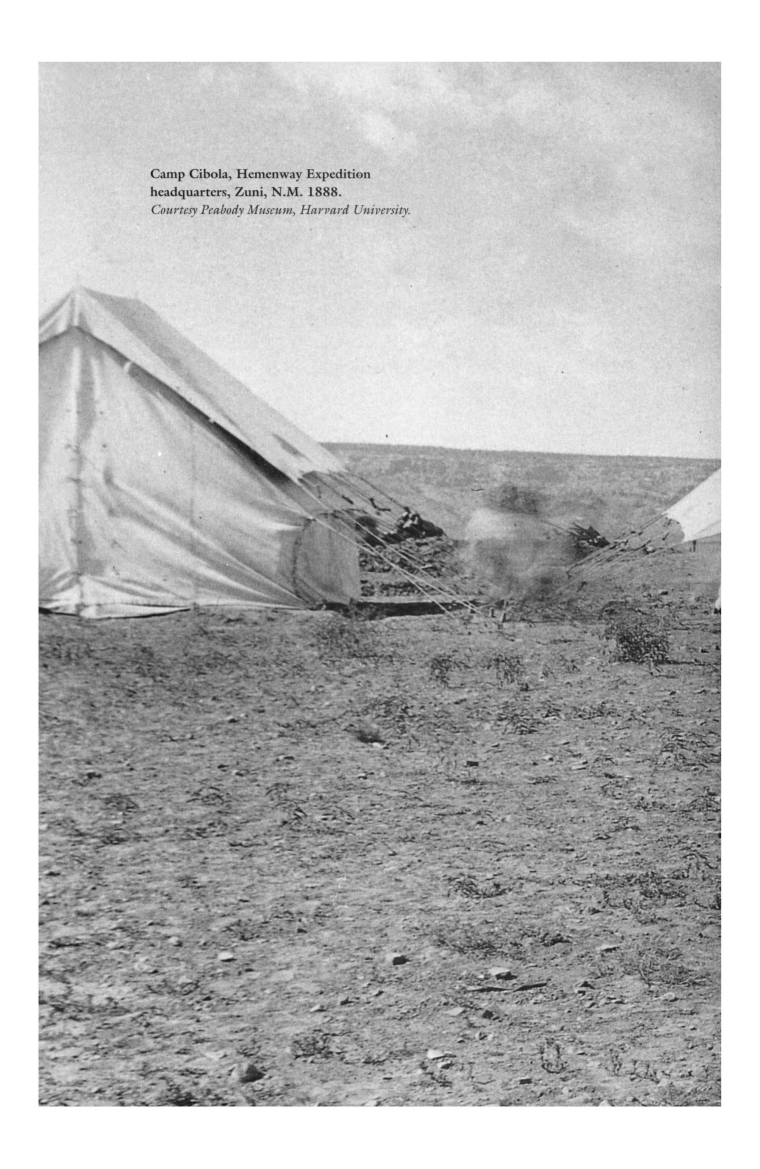
Camp Cibola (1888), the expedition's headquarters near Zuni

The Hemenway Southwestern Archaeological Expedition occurred between 1886 and 1894 in the American Southwest. Sponsored by Mary Tileston Hemenway, a wealthy widow and philanthropist, the expedition was initially led by Frank Hamilton Cushing, who was replaced in 1889 by Jesse Walter Fewkes. It was considered to be a major scientific archaeological expedition, notable for the discovery of the prehistoric Hohokam culture.

The expeditionary records held by Cushing were in storage until 1930. Emil Haury, a Harvard University student, was the first to study these, and he published a monograph on Pueblo de Los Muertos in 1945. The site had been investigated in detail by the Hemenway Expedition and dated to the Hohokam culture.

== Background ==
Mary Tileston Hemenway was a wealthy widow and philanthropist in New England who was impressed with Frank Hamilton Cushing's anthropological work studying the Zuni Indians in northwestern New Mexico and his enthusiasm for further investigations. Her ambition was to establish a private museum in Salem, Massachusetts based on archaeological finds, to be known as the Pueblo Museum, for the study of American Indians.

For this purpose she collaborated with Cushing to establish an expedition team with a board of directors to manage the operations. Cushing said that his ambition for the expedition was: “a rock of ages ... the foundation of something good and great for archeology and the sciences of humanity”. The expedition's agenda was to conduct archaeological and anthropological investigations in Fort Wingate, New Mexico and the Salt River Valley, near Phoenix, Arizona.

== Personnel ==
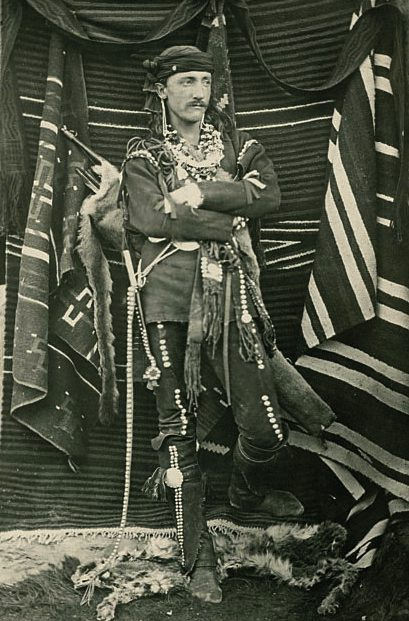
Cushing at Zuni, ca. 1881–82., by John Karl Hillers

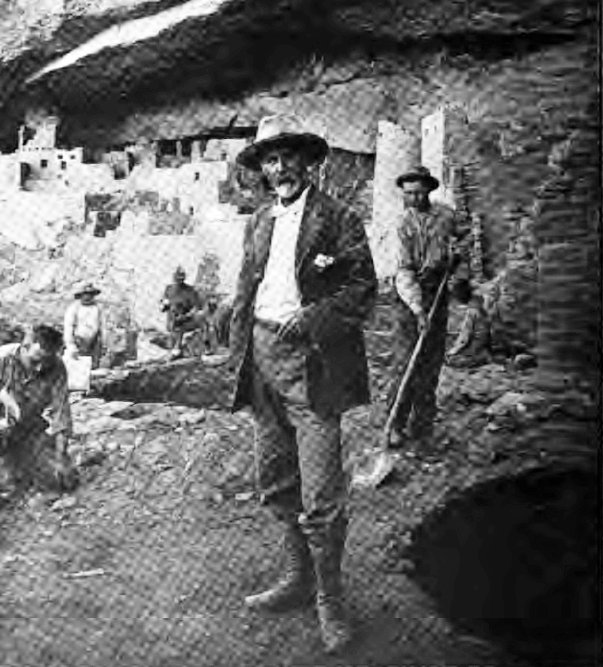
Fewkes, 1910

- Cushing, the expedition's director, brought along his wife, Emily, and her sister, Margaret Magill, as artist.
- Frederick Webb Hodge was working as an executive assistant at the Smithsonian Institution. Magill and Hodge fell in love and married in 1891.
- Sylvester Baxter, journalist and editor of the Boston Herald, served as the expedition's secretary-treasurer.
- Adolph Francis Alphonse Bandelier was a historian.
- Herman Frederik Carel ten Kate served as the physical anthropologist.
- Jesse Walter Fewkes, ethnologist who was chosen in 1889 to succeed Cushing as expedition leader.
- Charles A. Garlick, a former topographer with the U.S. Geographical Survey, served as the field manager.
- Dr. Jacob Lawson Wortman, of the Army Medical Museum, was to preserve any finds of skeletal remains.
- Army surgeon Washington Matthews took care of the medical needs of the team.

== Expedition ==
The expedition began in December 1886, departing from Albion, New York. It was the first of its kind undertaken in the American Southwest. The expedition's main base, Camp Hemenway, was located in Tempe, Arizona. It established at least two other bases: Camp Baxter, Arizona and Camp Cibola, New Mexico.

In the summer of 1888, the expedition moved northeast to Zuni, where Camp Cibola served as base camp. Hemenway's son, Augustus Hemenway Jr., and the board of directors terminated Cushing's services in 1889. He had fallen ill but they also believed that his exploration methods were not systematic. Jesse Walter Fewkes, an ethnologist and Harvard University classmate of August Hemenway Jr., was appointed as the new leader, though he lacked archeological experience.

When Mary Hemenway died in 1894, the board of directors terminated the expedition. It was then investigating the ethnological culture of the Hopi.

== Archaeological finds ==
The expedition excavated hundreds of skulls, mostly brachycephalic, from the ruins at Las Acequias, Los Guanacos, Los Muertos, and Halonawan, near Zuni.

== Aftermath ==
=== 19th century ===
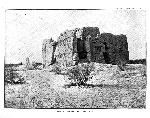
Hohokam culture's Casa Grande from the northeast ca. 1890.

Suffering from illness and depression after losing his leadership position, Cushing published a few partial papers before his sudden death in 1900. His report manuscripts were unpublished. After Cushing's death, the Hodges retained his manuscripts.

Several members of the expedition team contributed to Hemenway Expedition Records, 1886–1914, which was published in 1886. Bandelier published Copies Made Under A.F. Bandelier, a Member of the Hemenway Expedition, of Ancient Documents Existing in Mexico, Santa Fè, New Mexico, and Other Places in the Southwestern U.S., and Hemenway Southwestern Archaeological Expedition: Contributions to the History of the Southwestern Portion of the United States (1890).

Baxter's work, The Old New world: An account of the explorations of the Hemenway southwestern archæological expedition in 1887–88, under the direction of Frank Hamilton Cushing, was published in 1883. while Fewkes's Note Book on Hemenway Expedition was published in 1891. In 1893, Matthews, Wortman, and John Shaw Billings published The Human Bones of the Hemenway Collection in the United States Army Medical Museum at Washington (1893).

In 1895, the Hemenway family donated a box containing records and the expedition's artifacts to Harvard’s Peabody Museum of Archaeology and Ethnology.

=== 20th century ===
The artifacts box remained unopened at the Peabody until the 1930s, when Alfred Tozzer asked a student, Emil Haury, to do his dissertation on the contents. Haury’s report, published in 1945, was a monograph on La Pueblo de Los Muertos. It provided insight into the ancestral history of the Zuni and the development of the prehistoric Hohokam culture. Haury did not have access to the expedition's reports and manuscripts housed at the Southwest Museum in Los Angeles, and the Huntington Free Library in New York City.

Haury's monograph included a Foreword by Hodge. He surprisingly belittled the work of the expedition and demonstrated a lack of gratitude to his brother-in-law's memory. By taking Hodge on the expedition, Cushing had enabled him to gain field experience that later helped Hodge obtain a key position in 1905 at the Bureau of American Ethnology (now part of the Smithsonian Institution).

The full expedition report was not published for more than 100 years. Cushing's archival records, in the form of partial reports, diaries and field notes, had to be transcribed, researched, and annotated. Between 1991 and 2001, Hinsley, a cultural historian, and Wilcox, an archaeologist, examined the Hemenway records. They published their reports of the expedition in three volumes.

== Bibliography ==
- Bandelier, Adolph Francis Alphonse (n.d.). Copies Made Under A.F. Bandelier, a Member of the Hemenway Expedition, of Ancient Documents Existing in Mexico, Santa Fè, New Mexico, and Other Places in the Southwestern U.S.
- Bandelier, Adolph Francis Alphonse (1890). Hemenway Southwestern Archaeological Expedition: Contributions to the History of the Southwestern Portion of the United States (Public domain ed.). J. Wilson and Son.
- Bandelier, Adolph Francis Alphonse; Cushing, Frank Hamilton; Dewey, Mary E.; Fewkes, Jesse Walter; Robert Gorham Fuller; Charles Garlick; Augustus Hemenway; Mary Hemenway; Frederick Webb Hodge; Herman Frederik Carel Kate; Thomas V. Keam; Margaret Magill; Alexander MacGregor Stephen; Jacob Lawson Wortman; Charles Clark Willoughby; Old South Church (Boston, Mass.); Smithsonian Institution; Bureau of American Ethnology; United States. Dept. of the Interior; United States. Office of Indian Affairs (1886). Hemenway Expedition Records, 1886–1914 (Public domain ed.).
- Baxter, Sylvester (1883). The old New world: An account of the explorations of the Hemenway southwestern archæological expedition in 1887–88, under the direction of Frank Hamilton Cushing (Public domain ed.). Printed at the Salem Press.
- Fewkes, Jesse Walter (1891). Note Book on Hemenway Expedition. Boston – via Hemenway Southwestern Archaeological Expedition (1886–1894).
- Husher, E. H. (1995). "The Hemenway Photography of E. H. Husher, 1888–1889". Journal of the Southwest. 37 (4). JSTOR 40169951.
- Kate, Herman Frederik Carel (2004). Travels and Researches in Native North America, 1882–1883. UNM Press. ISBN 978-0826332813.
- Matthews, Washington; Wortman, Jacob Lawson; Billings, John Shaw (1893). Human Bones of the Hemenway Collection in the United States Army Medical Museum: Wash. Matthews, J.L. Wortman, J.S. Billings.
- Schlanger, Nathan; Nordbladh, Jarl (2008). Archives, Ancestors, Practices: Archaeology in the Light of Its History. Berghahn Books. ISBN 978-1845450663.
- Stocking, George W. (1983). Observers Observed: Essays on Ethnographic Fieldwork. Univ of Wisconsin Press. p. 61. ISBN 978-0299094546.
