= Minna B. Hall =

American socialite, environmentalist, and co-founder of Mass Audubon (1860–1951)

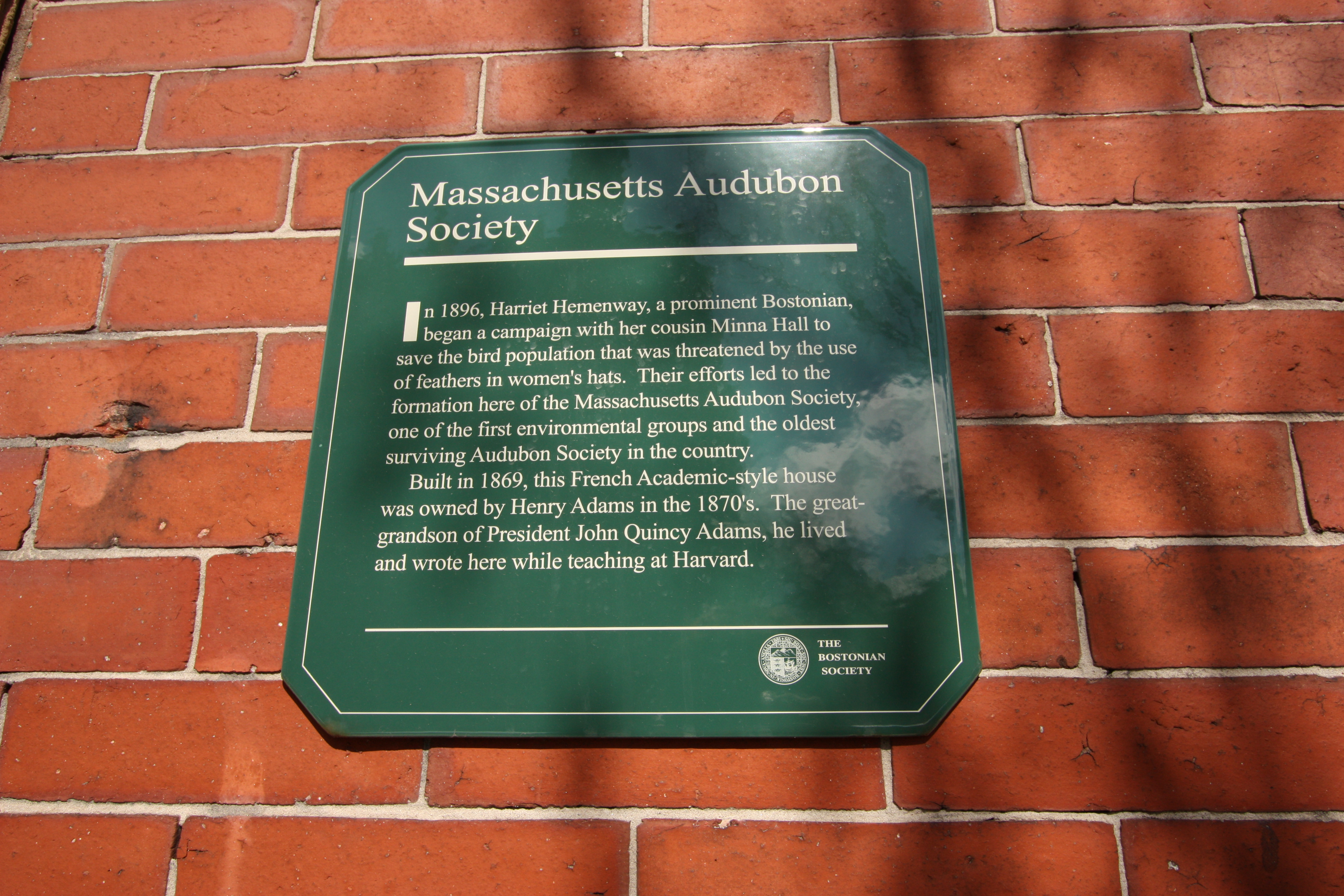
Plaque commemorating the foundation of the Audubon Society

Minna B. Hall (27 July 1859 – 24 July 1951) was an American socialite and environmentalist. Her most notable achievements include the co-founding of the Massachusetts Audubon Society and the ratification of the Weeks-McLean Act by the US Congress. Together with her cousin, Harriet Lawrence Hemenway, Hall organized ladies' teas at which she urged women to stop wearing hats with feathers. Hall's boycott of the fashion of wearing plumes ultimately changed the future of the American feather trade, and her activism remains a key event in the history of ornithological conservation.

Minna lived on 156, Ivy Street in Brookline, Massachusetts, for over 90 years. The pond by her house has been preserved as a wildlife sanctuary.
