= Pueblo de Los Muertos =

Historical ruin in Maricopa County, Arizona

Coordinates: 33.3075°N 111.9285°W

Pueblo de Los Muertos ("City of the Dead") is a historical ruin in the U.S. state of Arizona. It is situated approximately 5 miles (8.0 km) west of Chandler. The large Hohokam settlement was situated within the southern Salado valley.

== Geography ==
Los Muertos is situated west of Chandler and near Tempe, in the Salt River valley of southern Arizona. It covers an area greater than 2 square miles (5.2 km^{2}) along the borders of a canal or artificial river, measuring almost 6 by 1 mile (9.7 km × 1.6 km). The Los Muertos and Pueblo de las Acequias ("City of the Canals") ruins are approximately 6 miles (9.7 km) apart.

== History ==
In 1887, Frank Hamilton Cushing, leader of the Hemenway Southwestern Archaeological Expedition, explored the ruins of an early people, a place he called "El Pueblo de los Muertos"—"The City of the Dead"—in the center of which he uncovered many large communal houses, and beyond them found the remains of more sparsely-settled suburbs extending for 2 miles (3.2 km). The largest of these houses was bigger than Casa Grande. It was surrounded by smaller edifices, and the entire group was enclosed by an adobe wall, which was built as protection against enemies as well as to insure privacy to its occupants. There were windows and portholes in the outer walls of the houses, but there were no doors. The dwellers entered and exited by means of ladders against the outer wall and trap doors in the roofs leading to the rooms within. The walls of the houses were made of adobe, created by piling on more and more clay until the top was reached. The walls of the house were of sufficient thickness to insure protection against hostile tribes as well as the fierce summer heat of the desert. In the better-finished houses, the clay surface of the inner walls was rubbed by hand until it attained a high polish. The rafters between the stories were made of small tree trunks upon which lay a layer of reeds, which in turn was covered with a coating of cement-like clay.

In the yards or streets of Los Muertos, Cushing found public ovens and large cooking pits lined with clay or natural cement. The largest of these pits was 14 feet (4.3 m) across and 7 feet (2.1 m) deep. Within the houses, Cushing found the remains of dishes, utensils, and pottery; also, there were stones for grinding corn, stone axes, hammers and hoes, cotton cloth, skin-dressing implements, bone awls, and several other articles of the chase and of war and of domestic and religious usage. There were various little images, some not over 1 inch (25 mm), carved from stone. These dated to the Stone Age. In the corners of certain rooms at Los Muertos were the remains of persons buried in vaults. Others of their dead were first incinerated, and the remaining ash and charred bones were interred in urns made of pottery with inverted saucer-like lids. Two of the skeletons found in Los Muertos were nearly 6 feet (1.8 m) in length; most of them, however, were short in stature.

== Demographics ==
John Wesley Powell, the director of the U.S. Bureau of Ethnology, estimated that Los Muertos had at least 13,000 inhabitants.
