= Roxana Vivian =

American mathematician

Roxana Hayward Vivian (December 9, 1871 – May 31, 1961) was an American mathematics professor. She was the first female recipient of a doctorate in mathematics from the University of Pennsylvania.

== Early life and education ==
Roxana Hayward Vivian was born to Roxana Nott and Robert Hayward Vivian on December 9, 1871, in Hyde Park, Boston, Massachusetts. She went to Hyde Park High School and then, from 1890 to 1894, to Wellesley College where she graduated in Greek and mathematics.

== Career and research ==
After four years as a high school teacher in suburban Boston, Vivian started post-graduate study at the University of Pennsylvania, where she took a PhD in mathematics in 1901 with a thesis on "Poles of a Right Line with Respect to a Curve of the Order n". She returned to Wellesley College as a mathematics teacher, the first in her department to hold a doctorate. In 1906 she went to teach at the American College for Girls in Istanbul, Turkey, where for two years she was the acting president. In 1908 she became an associate professor at Wellesley, and was made a full professor in 1918; from 1918 to 1921 she was also director of the Graduate Department of Hygiene and Physical Education. In 1925–26 Vivian took a one-year professorship at Cornell University. She again returned to Wellesley, but soon resigned. In 1929, after a year in Vassalboro, Maine, she became a mathematics professor and dean of women at Hartwick College of Oneonta, New York. From 1931 to 1935 she was a mathematics teacher and dean of girls at Rye Public High School in New York. She died in 1961 in Boston.
