= Mary Tileston Hemenway =

American philanthropist (1820–1894)

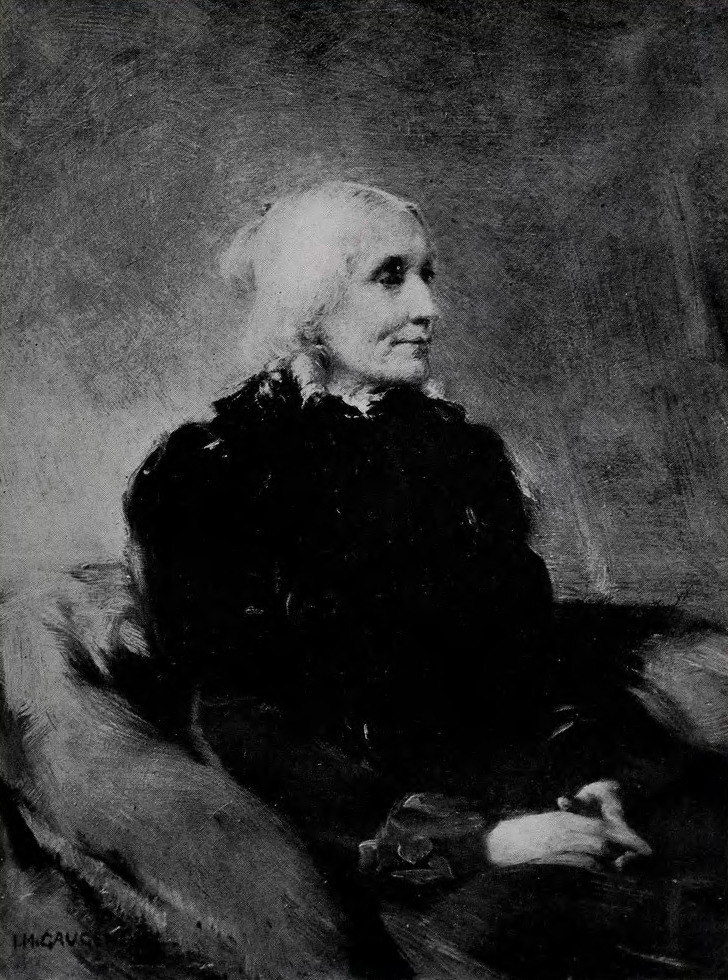
- portrait by Ignaz Gaugengigl
- Born: December 20, 1820; New York City
- Died: March 6, 1894 (aged 73); Beacon Hill, Boston, MA
- Spouse: Edward Augustus Holyoke Hemenway
- Children: 5

Mary Porter Tileston Hemenway (December 20, 1820 – March 6, 1894) was an American philanthropist. She funded Civil War hospitals, numerous educational institutions from the Reconstruction era until the late 1880s, founded a physical education teacher training program for women, and funded research for the preservation of culturally valuable historical sites.

== Early years ==
Mary Tileston was born in New York City the daughter of Mary (née Porter) and Thomas Tileston (1796–1864), a wealthy shipping merchant. She was educated in private schools. On June 25, 1840, in New York City, Tileston married Harvard graduate Edward Augustus Holyoke Hemenway (1803–1876), a multi-millionaire Boston sea merchant some seventeen years older than her. The couple then moved to Boston to establish their family mansion at 40 Mt. Vernon Street in Beacon Hill. Mary Hemenway was a member of the abolitionist James Freeman Clarke's Church of the Disciples.

The couple had several children: Charlotte Augusta Hemenway (1841–1865), Alice (d. in infancy, 1845–1847), Amy Hemenway (1848–1911); and Edith (1851–1904). Their only son, Augustus Jr. (1853–1931), married Harriet Lawrence. After her husband died in 1876, Mary Tileston Hemenway maintained his family name until her death. She apparently inherited $15,000,000.

== Career ==
During the Civil War Hemenway helped to fund the Sanitary Commission, a private relief agency to aid sick and wounded soldiers. They established and staffed hospitals, and housed recovering Union soldiers. In 1864 she donated $25,000 to the new Washington University in St. Louis, followed by other installments of $50,000 for the history department.

After the Civil War, in 1867 she funded the re-opening of the Union school in Wilmington, North Carolina with the support of the American Unitarian Association to provide free schooling for poor white children. As the executive of the Soldiers Memorial Society, Hemenway funded nurse Amy Morris Bradley to teach. By 1871 her funding built the Hemenway school to accommodate the needs of hundreds of students. Bradley hired her niece Amy Morris Homans to be the school's administrator. Hemenway then donated $100,000 to fund a teacher training school, the Tileston Normal School, in Wilmington.

In 1868 Hemenway helped to finance the Union Army leader General Samuel C. Armstrong of the Freedmen's Bureau, who had served with the United States Colored Troops, to create a literacy and industrial skills program for black Freedmen and women in Hampton, Virginia. Originally known as the Hampton Normal and Agricultural Institute, it was later renamed Hampton Institute and is now known as Hampton University. Initially for Freedmen and women, the school later incorporated indigenous students. According to her niece, Hemenway was visited by Armstrong and his daughters many years later at her summer estate in Manchester-by-the-Sea as they were close friends.

Following her husband's death in 1876, Hemenway donated $100,000 to help save the Old South Meeting House in Boston from destruction after a fire in 1872. She also hired Amy Morris Homans to become her personal assistant.

Around 1877, Hemenway bought a farm near Hampton Institute, 'Canebrakes' and some years later another farm 'Shellbanks' (a former plantation) to donate a total of 500 acres of land to Hampton Institute. Renamed as the Hemenway Farm, this land provided food for black and indigenous students at Hampton, and agricultural training. The property had a mansion house, guest cottage, large dairy barn, experimental gardens, and a wide range of livestock. The Vanisons, two black graduates of Hampton, were placed in charge; they worked and ran the farm and taught night school for students who worked on the farm. Hemenway also helped finance (among others) Booker T. Washington, a graduate of Hampton who became a principal at the teacher training school Tuskegee Institute established in 1881.

In 1885, to help develop industrial skills for girls, Hemenway funded a two year training program for sewing and cooking classes in Boston. She financed the first kitchen in a public school in the United States, known as the Boston School Kitchen. She then established the Boston Normal School of Cookery in 1887 to train teachers. She bore all the expenses until the school was fully functioning before turning it over to the Boston School Committee.

Hemenway also made large financial contributions to American archaeology. In 1886 the ethnologist Frank Hamilton Cushing travelled with Zuni Indians to Boston and met with Hemenway to petition her for support. Cushing had lived amongst the Zuni for five years and had learned their language. Hemenway provided $100,000 for The Hemenway Southwestern Archaeological Expedition (1886–1894) which was the first major archaeological expedition undertaken in the American Southwest with a team of ten. Hemenway funded studies of Zuni and Hopi language and song with the help of Thomas Edison who gave the expedition equipment to create recordings. Studies she funded on their culture were gathered into five volumes in the Journal of American Archaeology and Ethnology, published at her own expense. Archaeological items that were gathered in the Southwest were displayed in 1892 in Madrid, and at Harvard University in the Peabody Museum of Archaeology and Ethnology in the Hemenway Room. Soon after Hemenway organized for the preservation of the Hohokam 'Casa Grande' prehistoric site in Arizona. She petitioned Congress which granted protection of the ruins as a National Monument. With collaboration from the Zuni and Hopi communities, the expedition identified the prehistoric Hohokam culture of the Southwest. Drawings of pottery from this exhibition are in the Smithsonian archives.

In 1889 Hemenway and her assistant Amy Morris Homans organized and promoted a Conference on Physical Training in a hall at MIT. Conference attendees included established national authorities, the Boston School Committee, local Boston college Presidents, and physicians. Lectures spoke to the German, Swedish, and American amalgamation systems with over 2,000 attendees. Hemenway invited General Armstrong from Hampton Institute to attend. Ultimately, through her efforts promoting the Swedish system of physical culture over 60,000 Boston school children took part in daily exercise.

In 1889 Hemenway also established the Boston Normal School of Gymnastics (BNSG) under the appointed Director Amy Morris Homans. In 1892 there were 12 women graduates, the first of what would become hundreds of trained teachers. The school was dedicated to training women for the profession of teaching physical education in the Swedish system not only for primary schools but also in colleges and universities at a time when very few women had positions in higher education. Physical training was led by Claes J. Enebuske with later additions of faculty from Harvard University, Harvard Medical School, and MIT to teach science, chemistry, anatomy and biology, and theoretical courses. In addition to the Swedish system of physical culture, students also learned various physical games such as basketball and field hockey, and dance training under Melvin Gilbert. Graduates moved on to teach at Smith College, Hampton Institute, Drexel Institute, Radcliffe, Bryn Mawr, Wellesley College, and YMCA's. By 1906, 369 students had graduated from BNSG before the school was incorporated into Wellesley College. A new gymnasium was built at Wellesley and named Mary Hemenway Hall. Recently a bronze relief sculptural portrait by the artist Anne Whitney of Hemenway was found in the Wellesley Archives.

== Death and legacy ==
Hemenway died at her home on Beacon Hill. Her memorial service was held at the Old South Meeting House. She is remembered on the Boston Women's Heritage Trail. She is buried at Mt. Auburn Cemetery in Cambridge, MA (Thistle Path, Lot: 1463, Space 4).
