= Amy Morris Bradley =

American educator (1823–1904)

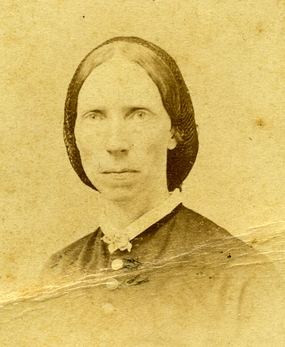
- Born: September 12, 1823; East Vassalboro, Maine, US
- Died: January 15, 1904
- Occupation(s): teacher, translator, nurse
- Known for: establishing the first English school in Central America
- Relatives: Amy Morris Homans (niece)

Amy Morris Bradley (September 12, 1823 – January 15, 1904) was an American educator from the U.S. state of Maine. She established the first English-language school in Central America. She also spent over 30 years establishing free schools in Wilmington, North Carolina.

== Early life ==
She was born September 12, 1823, in East Vassalboro, Maine. She was a granddaughter of Asa Bradley, a soldier of the American Revolution.

When she was six years old, her mother died, leaving a large family of children, Amy being the youngest. Bradley's religious affiliation was a Unitarian.

== Career ==
In 1840, she began to teach in country schools, and four years later was appointed principal of one of the grammar schools in Gardiner, Maine. In 1846, she became assistant teacher in the Winthrop grammar school of Charlestown, Massachusetts, and afterward in the Putnam Grammar School, East Cambridge, Massachusetts. She taught until the autumn of 1849, when, hampered by pneumonia, she was compelled to seek a milder climate. The winter of 1850-51 was passed in Charleston, South Carolina at the home of a brother, but with little benefit; and during the two years following, she was an invalid at her old home in Maine.

=== Central America ===
She was advised by her physician to live somewhere that was free from frost, in 1853, she went to San Jose, Costa Rica, where her health improved. In three months after her arrival, she established the first English school in Central America. She quickly mastered the Spanish language, and her pupils rapidly acquired the English. For nearly four years, she continued her educational work in San Jose.

In the summer of 1857, Bradley returned to her early home in East Vassalboro, where her father died in January 1858. The knowledge of Spanish acquired by Bradley in Costa Rica led the New England Glass Company, of East Cambridge to seek her services in translating letters.

=== American Civil War service ===
She was in Cambridge in 1861, when the first gun was fired at Fort Sumter. After the First Battle of Bull Run, she offered her services to the government as an army nurse. On September 1, 1861, she began working at the hospital of the Third Maine Regiment, encamped near Alexandria, Virginia. She was transferred to the Fifth Maine Regiment, and was soon appointed matron of the Seventeenth Brigade Hospital, General Slocum's Brigade, of which she had charge during the winter. In the spring of 1862, she responded to a call from the Relief Department of the United States Sanitary Commission, and went with Dorothea Dix to Fort Monroe. She was assigned to service on the transport boats, and labored throughout the Peninsula Campaign. In December 1862, she was sent to Convalescent Camp, Alexandria, and remained in charge of the Relief Department until the close of the American Civil War.

=== Wilmington schools ===
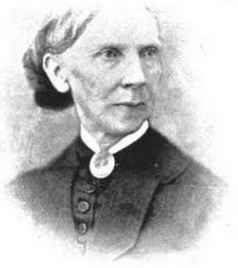
Bradley in later years

In 1866, at the request of the Soldiers' Memorial Society, of Boston, Massachusetts, and under the auspices of the American Unitarian Association, she went to Wilmington, North Carolina, as a teacher of poor white children. Her position at first was a trying one, for she was a stranger and a northerner. She opened her school on January 9, 1867, with three children, in a humble building. Within a week, 67 pupils were enrolled, and soon two additional teachers were engaged by her, and, as the number of pupils rapidly increased, new schools were opened, the "Hemenway," the "Pioneer" and the "Normal," and the corps of teachers increased accordingly. Within a few months, citizens co-operated with the trustees of the Peabody Fund and other benefactors in erecting the needed buildings and forwarding the work started by Bradley. On November 13, 1871, the cornerstone of the Tileston Normal School was laid, and it was opened in October 1872. This building was the gift of Mary Tileston Hemenway, who had been interested in Bradley's work from its beginning, and whose appreciation of its importance found expression in the annual contribution of US$5,000 toward the support of the Tileston Normal School, from its opening in 1872 to its close in 1891. Failing health led Miss Bradley to resign her position in 1891. In all, Bradley spent over 30 years establishing free schools in Wilmington.

== Death and legacy ==
Bradley died in January 1904.

A collection of Bradley's manuscripts, papers, and diaries are held at the Duke University Library in Durham, North Carolina.
