= China Village, Maine =

- Village
- Location within Maine Location within the United States
- Coordinates: 44°28′43″N 69°31′02″W
- Country: United States
- State: Maine
- County: Kennebec
- Town: China
- Elevation: 230 ft (70 m)
- Time zone: UTC-5 (Eastern (EST))
  - Summer (DST): UTC-4 (EDT)
- ZIP code: 04926
- Area code: 207
- GNIS feature ID: 563949
- China Village Historic District
- U.S. National Register of Historic Places
- U.S. Historic district
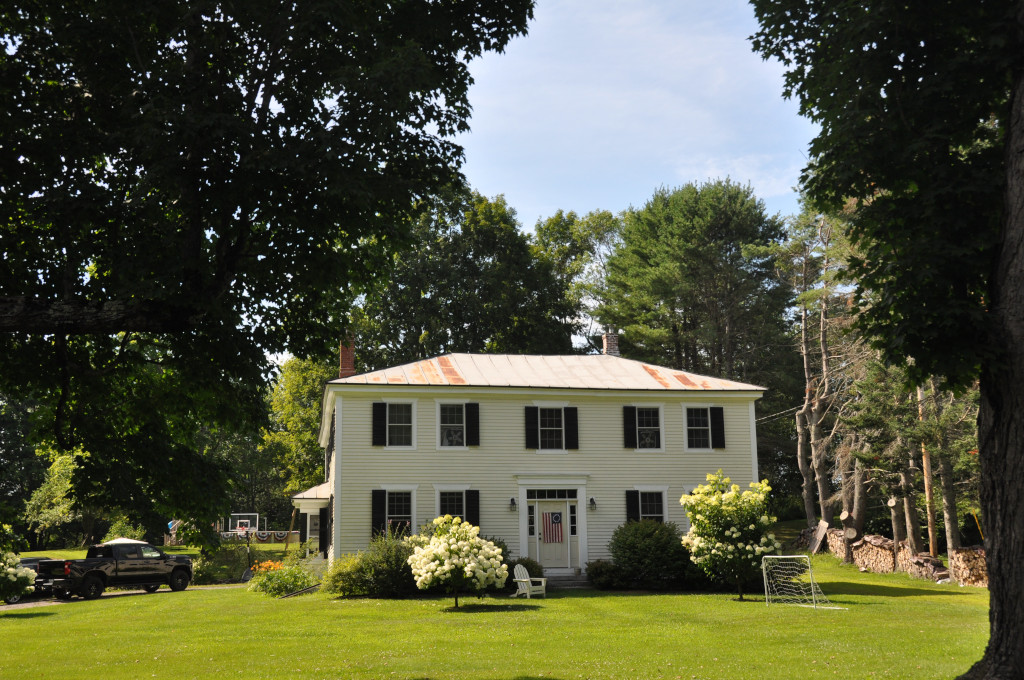
- Location: Main St., Neck Rd., Causeway St., China, Maine
- Area: 65 acres (26 ha)
- Architectural style: Greek Revival, Federal
- NRHP reference No.: 77000069
- Added to NRHP: November 23, 1977

China Village is an unincorporated village in the town of China, Kennebec County, Maine, United States. The community is located at the junction of U.S. Route 202, Maine State Route 9, and Maine State Route 137, 7.6 miles (12.2 km) southeast of Waterville. China Village has a post office. Most of the village is part of the China Village Historic District, added to the National Register of Historic Places in 1977.

== History ==
The area that is now China was surveyed in 1773 and 1774 by John "Black" Jones, and was first known as Jones Plantation. A larger area was incorporated in 1792 as "Harlem", and China was incorporated out of parts of Harlem and neighboring communities in 1818, eventually annexing the remainder of Harlem. The village grew at the north end of the lake due to the water power provided by nearby streams, and eventually became a stop on a regional stagecoach line. An academy was established 1823.

== Geography ==
China Village is located in the northern part of the town of China, at the northern tip of China Lake. It is roughly T-shaped, with a central junction of Main Street, Neck Road, and Causeway Road, the latter coming in at right angles to the other two. Canton and Peking Streets form a cluster of residences as side streets to the southeast of this junction. Public services in the village include a library, post office, and the local Baptist church. Most of the buildings in the village are residences, with about 75% built before 1850, exhibiting either Federal or Greek Revival styling.
