= Rufus Jones (writer) =

American Quaker theologian and writer (1863–1948)

Rufus Matthew Jones
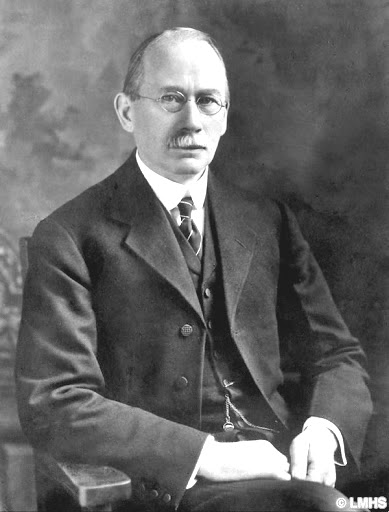
- Jones, date unknown
- Born: January 25, 1863; South China, Maine, U.S.
- Died: June 16, 1948 (aged 85); Haverford, Pennsylvania, U.S.

Education
- Education: Haverford College; Harvard University

Philosophical work
- Institutions: Haverford College
- Main interests: Mysticism, philosophy of religion, history of the Quakers, psychology
- Notable ideas: Affirmative mysticism

Rufus Matthew Jones (January 25, 1863 – June 16, 1948) was an American Quaker theologian, philosopher, historian, editor, and educator. He taught philosophy and psychology at Haverford College for 41 years and wrote more than 50 books and monographs, chiefly about Quaker history, mysticism, and the religious life. His interpretation of Quakerism as a mystical religion strongly influenced twentieth-century liberal Quaker thought, although later scholars have disputed parts of his historical argument.

Jones was a founder and the first chairman of the American Friends Service Committee (AFSC), organized in 1917 to create non-military service opportunities for conscientious objectors during World War I. He also worked for cooperation among divided branches of American Quakerism and promoted an activist form of spirituality that he called affirmative or positive mysticism.

== Early life and education ==
Jones was born in the Quaker farming community of South China, Maine, the son of Edwin Jones and Mary Gifford Hoxie Jones. He worshipped with his family at the Pond Meeting House and, later, the South China Meeting House. Several relatives were Quaker ministers; his uncle and aunt, Eli and Sybil Jones, were missionaries whose lives became the subject of Jones's first book.

After attending Providence Friends School in Rhode Island, Jones entered Haverford College. He received a bachelor's degree in 1885 and a master's degree in 1886. He subsequently studied at the University of Heidelberg, where he attended lectures by philosopher Kuno Fischer, and received a second master's degree from Harvard University in 1901.

Jones taught at Oakwood Seminary in New York and at Providence Friends School before becoming principal of Oak Grove Seminary in Maine, a position he held from 1889 to 1893. In 1890, South China Monthly Meeting recorded him as a Quaker minister.

== Academic and Quaker leadership ==
In 1893 Jones joined Haverford's faculty and simultaneously became editor of the Philadelphia-based Friends' Review. After that periodical merged with the Christian Worker in 1894, he edited the resulting American Friend until 1912. Through his teaching and journalism he advocated historical study of the Bible, a broadly Christian understanding of Quakerism, and greater cooperation among American yearly meetings divided by nineteenth-century schisms.

Jones taught philosophy and psychology at Haverford until his retirement in 1934. He also served as a trustee of Bryn Mawr College from 1898 to 1936 and as presiding clerk of the Five Years Meeting, now Friends United Meeting. His transatlantic collaboration with John Wilhelm Rowntree and William Charles Braithwaite led to the Rowntree series of Quaker histories. Jones contributed Studies in Mystical Religion (1909), The Quakers in the American Colonies (1911), Spiritual Reformers in the 16th and 17th Centuries (1914), and the two-volume The Later Periods of Quakerism (1921).

Jones delivered the first Swarthmore Lecture, Quakerism: A Religion of Life, in 1908. He delivered the lecture again in 1920, under the title The Nature and Authority of Conscience, making him the only person to have given two Swarthmore Lectures.

== Peace and humanitarian work ==
After the United States entered World War I, Jones helped organize a training program at Haverford for conscientious objectors who wished to undertake civilian relief rather than military service. This Haverford Emergency Unit contributed to the formation of the AFSC in Philadelphia in April 1917. Jones served as the committee's first chairman, overseeing relief and reconstruction work in France and, after the war, food relief in Germany and elsewhere in Europe. In 1920 he published an account of the early program, A Service of Love in War Time. He stepped down as chairman in 1928, when Henry Cadbury succeeded him, but continued as honorary chairman and remained active in the organization.

Following Kristallnacht in November 1938, the AFSC sent Jones, George Walton, and D. Robert Yarnall to Nazi Germany to investigate how Quakers might assist persecuted Jews. The delegation met Jewish community representatives, diplomats, and officials connected with Reinhard Heydrich's security apparatus. It sought permission to provide relief and support emigration. Jones later wrote that officials promised the Quakers access, but a Haverford archival account cautions that the mission produced no clear practical result.

The AFSC and the British Friends Service Council jointly received the 1947 Nobel Peace Prize for their peace and relief work. Contrary to some later accounts, Jones did not accept the prize in Stockholm: Henry Cadbury represented the AFSC at the ceremony in Oslo on December 10, 1947.

== International and ecumenical work ==
Jones travelled widely as a lecturer and Quaker representative. During a 1926 journey undertaken in connection with the YMCA, he lectured in China and visited Japan, the Philippines, Ceylon, and India. He met Mahatma Gandhi in India and discussed Quakerism and religious service with him.

In 1932 Jones participated in the Laymen's Foreign Missions Inquiry, which examined Protestant missions in Asia. Its report, Re-Thinking Missions: A Laymen's Inquiry after One Hundred Years, urged greater respect for Asian cultures and religions and placed more emphasis on education, health, and social service than on denominational competition. Jones developed related themes in A Preface to Christian Faith in a New Age (1932).

Jones also taught the African American theologian Howard Thurman, who studied mysticism with him at Haverford in the spring of 1929. Thurman later described the period as important to his intellectual and spiritual development; mystical theology became central to his work and, through him, influenced religious currents within the civil rights movement.

== Religious thought ==
Jones presented religion primarily as lived experience rather than assent to a creed. Drawing on Quaker sources, Christian mysticism, Ralph Waldo Emerson, and the psychology of William James, he argued that direct awareness of God was available within ordinary human experience. He helped popularize the phrase "that of God in every one" as an account of the Quaker Inner Light.

He contrasted a "negative" mysticism of withdrawal and loss of self with "affirmative" mysticism, in which communion with God preserved and transformed the personality. For Jones, genuine mystical experience should issue in ethical action, social service, vitality, and closer relations with other people. He therefore rejected a sharp division between contemplation and reform.

His theology helped shape modern liberal Quakerism, particularly its language of inward religious experience and its linkage of spirituality with humanitarian action. It was not accepted by all Quakers: evangelical Friends objected to his theological modernism, while later historians questioned his claim that early Quakerism arose chiefly from a transhistorical mystical tradition. Sociologist Stephen A. Kent argued that Jones and James treated early Quaker experience too independently of its historical and social setting. More recent scholarship has continued to treat Jones's definition of Quaker mysticism as influential but contested.

== Personal life and death ==
Jones married Sarah H. Coutant in 1888. Their son, Lowell Coutant Jones, was born in 1892; Sarah died from tuberculosis in 1899, and Lowell died from diphtheria in 1903. Jones married Elizabeth Bartram Cadbury in 1902. Their daughter, Mary Hoxie Jones, later wrote a biography of her father.

Jones died in his sleep at his home in Haverford, Pennsylvania, on June 16, 1948, aged 85. His efforts toward inter-Quaker cooperation helped prepare the ground for later reunifications, including the 1955 reunification of Philadelphia's Hicksite and Orthodox yearly meetings.

== Selected works ==
Jones wrote or edited more than 50 books and numerous articles and pamphlets. Among his principal works are:

- Eli and Sybil Jones: Their Life and Work (1889)
- Social Law in the Spiritual World: Studies in Human and Divine Inter-Relationship (1904)
- The Double Search: Studies in Atonement and Prayer (1906)
- Quakerism: A Religion of Life (1908), the first Swarthmore Lecture
- Studies in Mystical Religion (1909)
- The Quakers in the American Colonies (1911)
- Spiritual Reformers in the 16th and 17th Centuries (1914)
- The Inner Life (1916)
- The World Within (1918)
- A Service of Love in War Time: American Friends Relief Work in Europe, 1917–1919 (1920)
- The Nature and Authority of Conscience (1920), the Swarthmore Lecture
- The Later Periods of Quakerism (two volumes, 1921)
- The Church's Debt to Heretics (1924)
- The Faith and Practice of the Quakers (1927)
- A Preface to Christian Faith in a New Age (1932)
- The Trail of Life in the Middle Years (1934)
- The Flowering of Mysticism (1939)
- A Small-Town Boy (1941)
- The Luminous Trail (1947)

== See also ==
- American philosophy
- Christian mysticism
- History of the Quakers
- Quaker testimony
