= Augustus Hemenway =

American politician

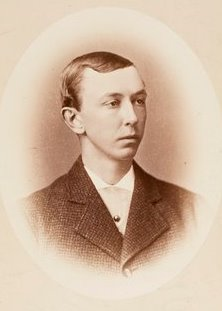
- Hemenway c. 1875

Member of the Massachusetts House of Representatives from the 4th Norfolk district
- In office 1890–1891

Personal details
- Born: 1853
- Died: 1931 (aged 77–78)
- Education: Harvard University

Augustus Hemenway (1853–1931) was a philanthropist and public servant in Boston, Massachusetts, in the latter part of the 19th century. He was educated at Harvard University, the son of Edward Augustus Holyoke Hemenway and Mary Tileston Hemenway. His siblings were Edith Hemenway Eustis (1851-1904), Charlotte Augusta (d. 1865), Alice, (d. in infancy), and Amy.

In 1878, he donated the Hemenway Gymnasium to Harvard and expanded it in 1895; he also served as an overseer of the university. He supported a number of other institutions in the Boston area, including the Museum of Fine Arts, Massachusetts Eye and Ear Infirmary, Groton School, Metropolitan Park Commission, and MIT. In December 1881, he married Harriet Lawrence, who became the cofounder of the initial Audubon Society; the Massachusetts Audubon Society; they had 5 children.

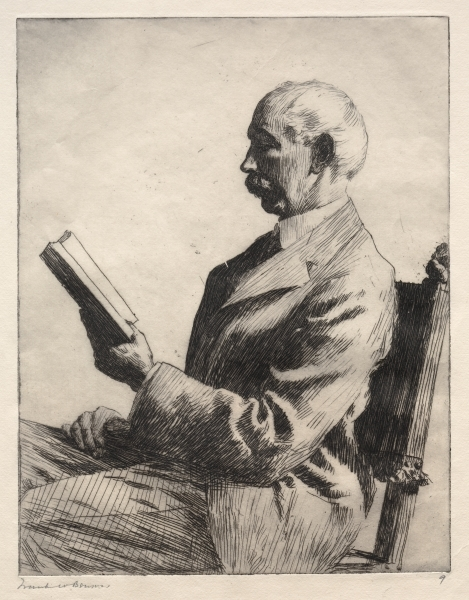
Augustus Hemenway, by Frank Weston Benson, 1919

Hemenway served in the Massachusetts House of Representatives in 1890 and 1891. Upon his death in 1931, it was said of him: "In the various interests ... thrust upon him he never failed to do his full share in attending to the work at hand."
