= China Lake (Maine) =

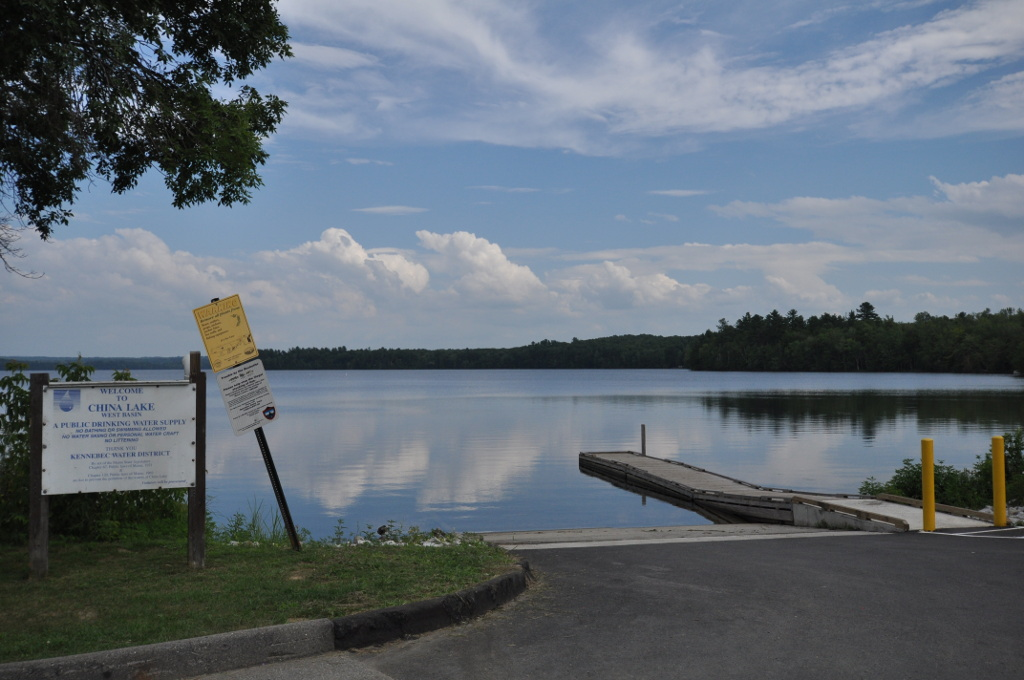
- Boat launch on China Lake in Vassalboro

- Location within Maine Location within the United States
- Location: Kennebec County, Maine, United States
- Coordinates: 44.433°N 69.547°W
- Lake type: Reservoir
- Basin countries: United States
- Max. length: 6.8 mi (10.9 km)
- Surface area: 3,939 acres (1,594 ha)
- Max. depth: 85 ft (26 m)
- Water volume: 97,286 acre⋅ft (120,001,000 m^{3})
- Surface elevation: 194 ft (59 m)
- Settlements: China; Vassalboro

China Lake is a lake in Kennebec County, Maine. Located northeast of the state capital of Augusta, China Lake is situated in the towns of China and Vassalboro. China Lake has two large basins connected by a narrow neck. The elongated eastern basin with an average depth of less than 30 feet (9.1 m) is entirely within the town of China, and has an irregular shoreline with residences and seasonal cottages. The more nearly circular western basin extending into East Vassalboro is as deep as 85 feet (26 m), and shoreline development around the western basin has been discouraged to allow use as a water supply for Waterville and Winslow. The western basin overflows into Outlet Stream in the town of Vassalboro. Outlet Stream flows 7 miles (11 km) north to discharge into the Sebasticook River in Winslow 1 mile (1.6 km) upstream of the Kennebec River.

Summer water temperatures in China Lake range from 72 °F (22 °C) near the surface to 48 °F (9 °C) in the deepest pools. Nutrient loading from shoreline development causes annual algal blooms with nocturnal depression of dissolved oxygen concentrations. These conditions have become unsuitable for historic populations of Atlantic salmon and lake trout. Introduced brown trout have adapted to lake conditions, and brook trout fishing has been sustained by stocking legal-size fish from surplus hatchery production. China Lake is also known locally for producing some of the most productive Largemouth Bass fishing in Maine, with several large tournaments held each summer. Other fish found in the lake include smallmouth bass, chain pickerel, white perch, yellow perch, sunfish, creek chub, white sucker, hornpout, and American eel. Public boat launch facilities are available at the north end of the eastern basin and in Vassalboro near the outlet of the western basin.
