= Harriet Hemenway =

American ornithologist (1858–1960)

Harriet Lawrence Hemenway
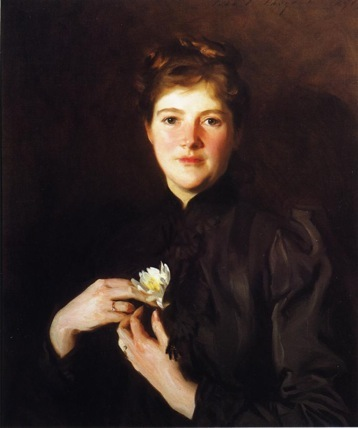
- Mrs. Augustus Hemenway by John Singer Sargent, 1890
- Born: 1858
- Died: 1960 (aged 101–102)
- Spouse: Augustus Hemenway
- Children: Five

Harriet Lawrence Hemenway (1858–1960) was a Boston socialite who cofounded the Massachusetts Audubon Society with Minna B. Hall. Hemenway was the wife of Augustus Hemenway.

During the Gilded Age, it became fashionable for women to wear hats decorated with plumes. These plumes came from woodpeckers, bluebirds, owls, herons and warblers, thousands of which were killed each year. In 1896, Hemenway and her cousin Minna B. Hall held tea parties for the wealthy women of Boston where they urged them not to wear feathered hats and invited them to join a society for the protection of birds. Having gained the support of many of these fashionable women, Hemenway and Hall then organized meetings between leaders of the high society and prominent New England ornithologists, paving the way for the creation of the Massachusetts Audubon Society; over 900 women joined.

Hemenway and Hall recruited William Brewster, a leading ornithologist, to be the Massachusetts Audubon Society's first president. Women played a critical role in the organization, counting for half of its officers and serving as leaders of most of the local chapters. The group used its political power to have a Massachusetts law passed in 1897 outlawing trade in wild bird feathers as well as a federal law, the 1900 Lacey Act, which prohibits the interstate shipment of animals killed in violation of local laws. The Massachusetts Audubon Society remains independent, but it helped to organize the National Association of Audubon Societies (incorporated in 1905), which later became the National Audubon Society.

Hemenway was not a stranger to controversy and came from a family of abolitionists. She once invited Booker T. Washington to stay in her home, when Boston hotels refused to let him a room.

In 1898, Hemenway donated $50,000 for the construction of the gymnasium at Radcliffe College. Her home is a stop on the Boston Women's Heritage Trail.

Hemenway Street was named in her honor. It runs between Boylston Street and Huntington Avenue in Boston's Fenway neighborhood.
