= Vassalboro, Maine =

- Town
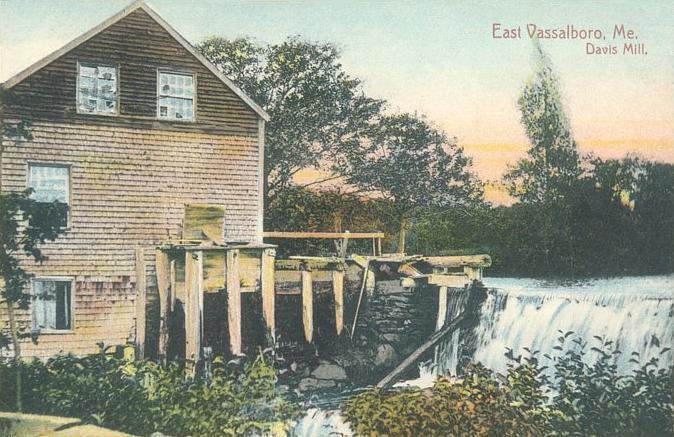
- East Vassalboro falls in 1910

- Seal

- Location in Kennebec County and the state of Maine.
- Coordinates: 44°26′15″N 69°38′43″W
- Country: United States
- State: Maine
- County: Kennebec
- Incorporated: April 26, 1771
- Villages: Vassalboro; Center Vassalboro; East Vassalboro; North Vassalboro; Riverside; South Vassalboro

Area
  - Total: 47.81 sq mi (123.83 km^{2})
  - Land: 44.27 sq mi (114.66 km^{2})
  - Water: 3.54 sq mi (9.17 km^{2})
- Elevation: 154 ft (47 m)

Population (2020)
  - Total: 4,520
  - Density: 102/sq mi (39.4/km^{2})
- Time zone: UTC−5 (Eastern (EST))
  - Summer (DST): UTC−4 (EDT)
- ZIP Codes: 04989 (Vassalboro); 04935 (East Vassalboro); 04962 (North Vassalboro)
- Area code: 207
- FIPS code: 23-78745
- GNIS feature ID: 582778
- Website: www.vassalboro.net

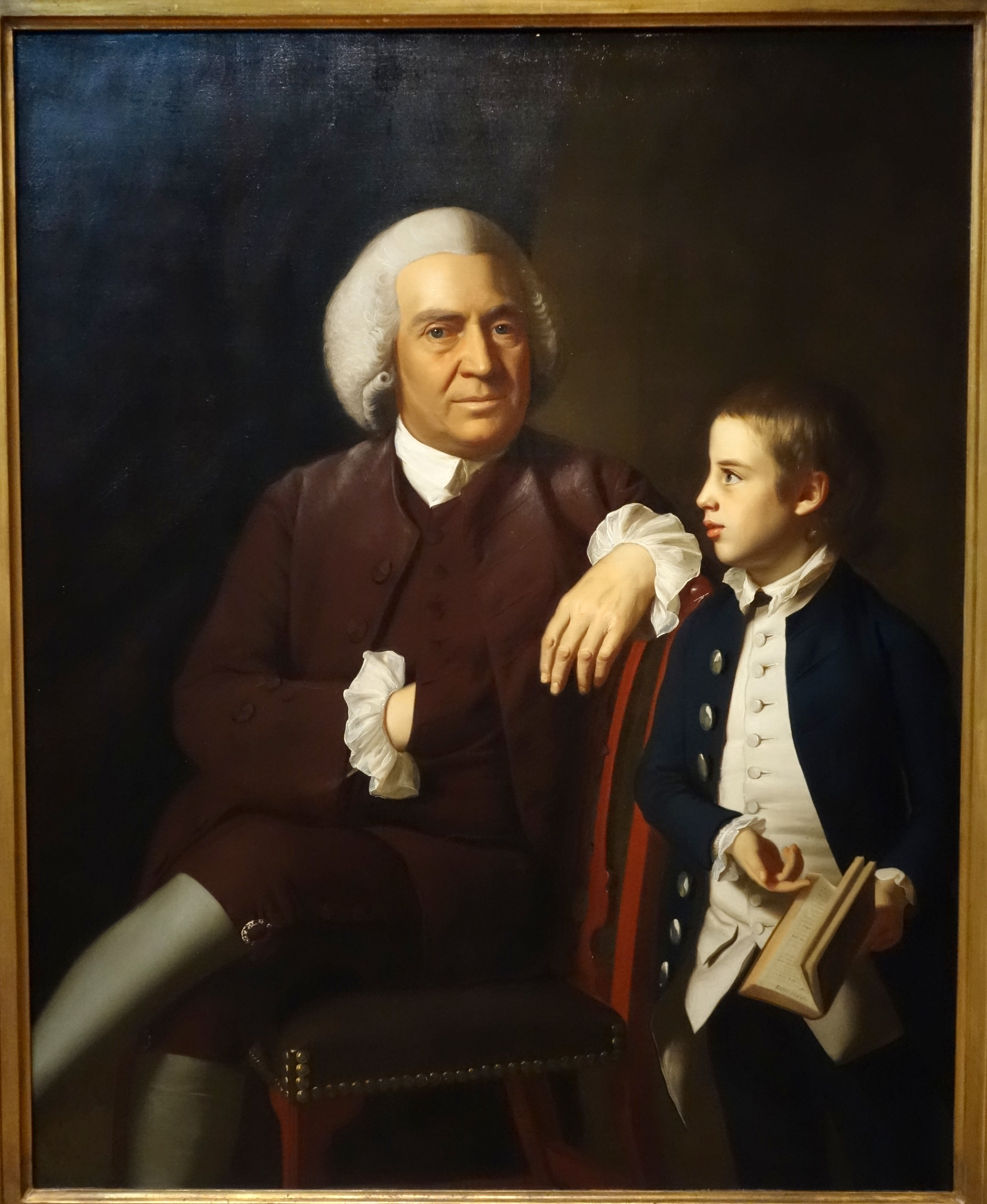
Proprietor William Vassall (1715–1800) with his son Leonard painted by John Singleton Copley in about 1771, when Vassalboro was incorporated.

Vassalboro (originally Vassalborough) is a town in Kennebec County, Maine, United States. The population was 4,520 at the 2020 census. Vassalboro includes the villages of Riverside, Getchell's Corner, North Vassalboro, and East Vassalboro, home to the town library and sports field. Vassalboro is included in the Augusta, Maine, micropolitan New England City and Town Area.

== History ==
Vassalboro was first settled by colonists in 1760 and incorporated in 1771. It was named for one of the settlement's proprietors, William Vassall.

=== William Vassall ===
William Vassall was born in 1715 on his family's Jamaican sugar plantation. Slavery had formed an "integral part" of the Vassalls' fortune since 1648, when William's great-grandfather moved to Barbados and launched the family into the sugar business. As a boy, Vassall moved first to Philadelphia, then Boston. He earned a BA (1733) and an MA (1743) from Harvard. A Loyalist during the Revolution, he fled to England, where he died in 1800, having spent many years arguing for "compensation for what he deemed the illegal confiscation of his properties in Massachusetts and Rhode Island."

On 2 March 1770, Vassall conveyed to his niece Mary Prescott of Nova Scotia Lot Number 5 in Vassalboro, one of the so-called "Proprietor's Lots" reserved for the town's founders. Niece Prescott sold the lot nine months later to a citizen of Hallowell.

=== Other notes ===
The Revere House in East Vassalboro was once the home of Alexander Graham Bell. The Vassalboro Historical Society resides in the old school- house near the East Vassalboro China Lake landing. The East Vassalboro Grange hosts the annual library book sale in the fall.

The Vassalboro rec fields on Bog Road hosts sports events and teams and has a newly opened walking trail which includes portions of the abandoned narrow gauge Wiscassett, Waterville, & Farmington Railway roadbed.

== Geography ==
According to the United States Census Bureau, the town has a total area of 47.81 square miles (123.83 km^{2}), of which 44.27 square miles (114.66 km^{2}) is land and 3.54 square miles (9.17 km^{2}) is water. Drained by Seven Mile Brook, Vassalboro is bounded on the west by the Kennebec River. China Lake is also partially located in the town.

The town is served by U.S. Route 201 and U.S. Route 202, in addition to state routes 3, 9, 32 and 100. It borders the towns of China to the east, Augusta to the south, Winslow to the north, and across the Kennebec River, Sidney to the west.

== Demographics ==
Historical population
Census	Pop.	Note	%±
1790	1,253		—
1800	1,188		−5.2%
1810	2,063		73.7%
1820	2,434		18.0%
1830	2,761		13.4%
1840	2,952		6.9%
1850	3,099		5.0%
1860	3,181		2.6%
1870	2,919		−8.2%
1880	2,621		−10.2%
1890	2,052		−21.7%
1900	2,062		0.5%
1910	2,107		2.2%
1920	1,815		−13.9%
1930	1,936		6.7%
1940	1,981		2.3%
1950	2,261		14.1%
1960	2,446		8.2%
1970	2,618		7.0%
1980	3,410		30.3%
1990	3,679		7.9%
2000	4,047		10.0%
2010	4,340		7.2%
2020	4,520		4.1%
U.S. Decennial Census

=== 2010 census ===
As of the census of 2010, there were 4,340 people, 1,788 households, and 1,206 families living in the town. The population density was 98.0 inhabitants per square mile (37.8/km^{2}). There were 2,065 housing units at an average density of 46.6 per square mile (18.0/km^{2}). The racial makeup of the town was 97.2% White, 0.3% African American, 0.3% Native American, 0.3% Asian, 0.2% from other races, and 1.6% from two or more races. Hispanic or Latino of any race were 0.6% of the population.

There were 1,788 households, of which 30.0% had children under the age of 18 living with them, 52.0% were married couples living together, 10.0% had a female householder with no husband present, 5.5% had a male householder with no wife present, and 32.6% were non-families. Of all households 23.8% were made up of individuals, and 9.2% had someone living alone who was 65 years of age or older. The average household size was 2.42 and the average family size was 2.86.

The median age in the town was 44 years. Of residents 21.6% were under the age of 18; 7.1% were between the ages of 18 and 24; 22.8% were from 25 to 44; 33.7% were from 45 to 64; and 14.7% were 65 years of age or older. The gender makeup of the town was 49.6% male and 50.4% female.

=== 2000 census ===
As of the census of 2000, there were 4,047 people, 1,549 households, and 1,138 families living in the town. The population density was 91.4 inhabitants per square mile (35.3/km^{2}). There were 1,838 housing units at an average density of 41.5 per square mile (16.0/km^{2}). The racial makeup of the town was 98.62% White, 0.15% African American, 0.22% Native American, 0.05% Asian, 0.17% from other races, and 0.79% from two or more races. Hispanic or Latino of any race were 0.57% of the population.

There were 1,549 households, out of which 36.9% had children under the age of 18 living with them, 58.7% were married couples living together, 9.5% had a female householder with no husband present, and 26.5% were non-families. Of all households 19.0% were made up of individuals, and 7.2% had someone living alone who was 65 years of age or older. The average household size was 2.60 and the average family size was 2.94.

In the town, the population was spread out, with 28.2% under the age of 18, 6.5% from 18 to 24, 30.9% from 25 to 44, 24.1% from 45 to 64, and 11.4% who were 65 years of age or older. The median age was 37 years. For every 100 females there were 98.4 males. For every 100 females age 18 and over, there were 95.8 males.

The median income for a household in the town was $47,923, and the median income for a family was $40,192. Males had a median income of $31,859 versus $21,299 for females. The per capita income for the town was $16,281. About 8.3% of families and 10.6% of the population were below the poverty line, including 10.4% of those under age 18 and 10.6% of those age 65 or over.

== Education ==
The town is home to Vassalboro Community School, which is attended by approximately 420 students. There is no public high school. Students have the choice of Winslow High School in Winslow, Waterville High School in Waterville, Cony High School in Augusta, and Erskine Academy in South China, where most students choose to attend. Erskine has a lowered rate for Vassalboro students.

It was a part of Kennebec Valley Consolidated Schools (AOS92) until July 1, 2018.

== Sites of interest ==
- Vassalboro Historical Society & Museum

== Notable people ==
- Edward Augustus Brackett, sculptor
- Holman Day, author, editor
- Henry H. Goddard, psychologist, eugenicist
- Amy Morris Homans, physical educator
- Alfred Atmore Pope, industrialist, art collector
