= Kennebec Valley Consolidated Schools =

Defunct school district in Maine, United States

Kennebec Valley Consolidated Schools or Alternative Organizational Structure 92 (AOS 92) was a school district with the superintendent based in Waterville, Maine, and with another office in Winslow, Maine. The district served Waterville, Winslow, and Vassalboro.

The district had about 3,000 students in the school department. Eric L. Haley was the superintendent. Peter A. Thiboutot was the assistant superintendent.

== History ==
The district was combined in 2009 as per state law required it. The district was established as part of the 2007 State of Maine School Administrative Reorganization law.

AOS 92 communities were two former school districts. Waterville Schools were their own independent school department, and Winslow and Vassalboro were part of School Union 52, along with China, which went to RSU 18 when the new state law came in 2009.

On March 13, 2018, Waterville, Winslow, and Vassalboro residents voted to dissolve AOS 92 by 253 votes. Each town became their own independent school department on June 30, 2018. The votes were 183–58 in Waterville, 122–62 in Winslow, and 81–13 in Vassalboro; a snowstorm caused the turnout to be lower. On July 1, 2018, the district ceased to exist.

Winslow Schools were in the process of developing a new school system to get rid of the junior high, and send the 6th graders to the elementary, and add on for 7th and 8th graders at the high school, plus a new auditorium. A 600-seat one was included in a November 2017 referendum, but failed. A 415-seat one was included in a June 2018 referendum, and passed.

== Schools ==
AOS 92 had 8 schools.

=== Vassalboro ===
- Vassalboro Community School, Grades PK-8

=== Waterville ===
- George J. Mitchell School, Grades PK-3
- Albert S. Hall School, Grades 4-5
- Waterville Jr. High School, Grades 6-8
- Waterville Sr. High School, Grades 9-12
- Educare Central Maine, Ages 3–5
- Mid Maine Adult Education
- Mid Maine Technical Center - Winslow High School students attend along with nearby Lawrence High School of MSAD 49 and Messalonskee High School of RSU 18.

=== Winslow ===
- Winslow Elementary School, Grades PK-5
- Winslow Jr. High School, Grades 6-8
- Winslow High School, Grades 9-12

== District Auditorium ==
Trask Auditorium at Waterville High School was the district auditorium. It has 698 seats.
