= Karen Heck =

American activist and politician

Mayor of Waterville, Maine
- In office 2012–2014
- Preceded by: Dana W. Sennett
- Succeeded by: Nicholas Isgro

Personal details
- Born: 1952 (age 73–74) New York City, U.S.
- Party: Independent
- Occupation: Community activist, women's rights activist, non-profit administrator
- Awards: Women of the Year (co-winner), Maine Federation of Business and Professional Women's Clubs (2002); Maine Women's Hall of Fame (2008)

Karen Heck (born 1952) is an American activist, nonprofit administrator, and politician. She was mayor of Waterville, Maine from 2012 to 2014. She was inducted into the Maine Women's Hall of Fame in 2008.

== Early life and education ==
Karen Heck was born in New York to Carroll Gustav Heck, a Bethlehem Steel engineer, and his wife June Platz Heck. She has two sisters.

She earned a B.A. in government from Colby College in 1974 and an M.S. in human development from the University of Maine in 1979.

== Career ==
In the 1980s Heck worked for the Kennebec Valley Community Action Program in the areas of family planning, reproductive rights, and universal health care. In 2000 she co-founded, together with Lyn Mikel Brown and Lynn Cole, the Hardy Girls Healthy Women research organization. She currently works for The Avalon Group in Waterville, a business and management consulting firm in the area of women's and girls' health, and is a senior program officer for The Bingham Program in Augusta, a philanthropic organization that funds health and medical programs in the state.

== Politics ==
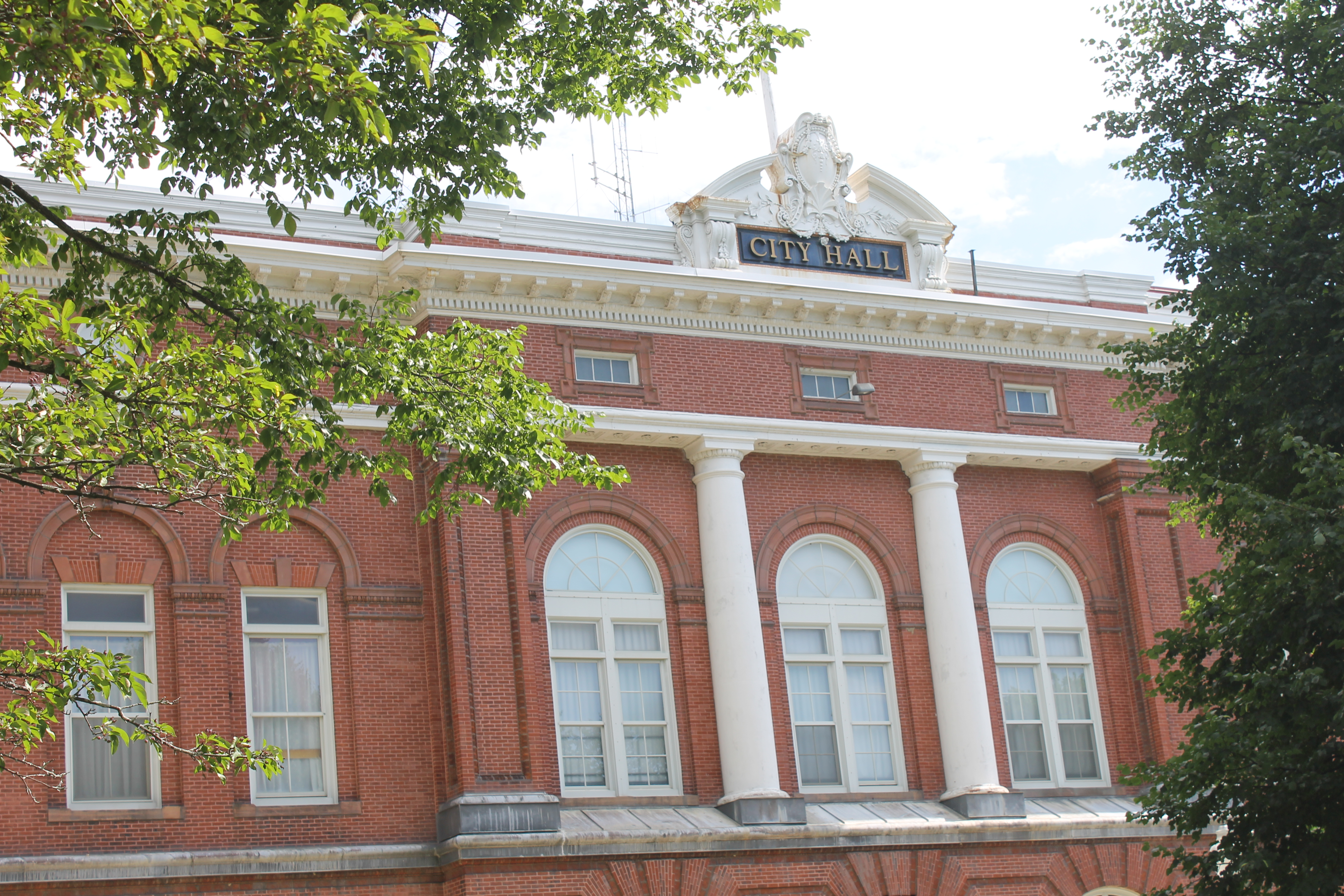
Waterville City Hall

In 2011 Heck ran for mayor of Waterville as an independent, backed by a campaign staff of five young women operatives. She defeated Democratic mayor Dana W. Sennett, who had been elected in June of that year to fill former mayor Paul LePage's remaining term after his ascension to governor of Maine, and Republican Andrew Roy, a disc jockey. She garnered 54 percent of the vote in the three-way race, with 2,021 votes out of a total 3,778 ballots cast. Among her accomplishments were the formation of a committee that initiated improvements at Waterville Robert LaFleur Airport, and Community Convergence, a question-and-answer forum for city residents.

Heck also launched, supported and endorsed the recall of her successor to the Mayorship of Waterville, Nick Isgro, a conservative Republican. The recall divided the community and ultimately failed.

In 2025, Heck endorsed progressive Graham Platner for the 2026 United States Senate election in Maine.

== Winery and distillery ==
Heck and Bruce Olson are co-owners of Tree Spirits, an Oakland-based winery and distillery. The company has won international competitions since 2011 for its wines and distilled spirits made from locally sourced apple, pear, and maple syrup, and is the sole distiller of absinthe in New England.

== Memberships ==
Heck is a past president of the Waterville Rotary and the Coalition and Family Planning Providers group. She was a co-chair of the Maine Choice Coalition. She has served on the boards of the Maine Women's Fund, Safe Abortions for Everyone, Waterville Rape Crisis Assistance, Women's Development Institute, SAFE, Inc., and the Maine Center for Economic Policy. She has volunteered for the Mid-Maine United Way, the Mid-Maine Homeless Shelter, and the Waterville Boys and Girls Club, and campaigned for women running for state office.

== Awards and honors ==
Heck shared the 2002 Women of the Year award from the Maine Federation of Business and Professional Women's Clubs with Brown and Cole, her co-founders at Hardy Girls Healthy Women, and received the 2006 Achievement Citation Award from the Maine Statewide American Association of University Women. She was inducted into the Maine Women's Hall of Fame in 2008.
