= Constance Fisher =

American serial killer (1929-1973

- Born: Constance Margaret Sirois; March 26, 1929; Oakland, Maine, U.S.
- Died: October 1, 1973 (aged 44); Kennebec River, near Gardiner, Maine, U.S.
- Conviction: N/A (not guilty by reason of insanity)
- Penalty: Involuntary commitment

Details
- Victims: 6
- Span of crimes: 1954–1966
- Country: United States
- State: Maine
- Date apprehended: For the last time on July 1, 1966

Constance Margaret Fisher (née Sirois; March 26, 1929 – October 1, 1973) was an American serial mass murderer. Diagnosed with paranoid schizophrenia, she killed three of her children in Maine in 1954. After spending several years in a mental institution, she was released, only to kill three more of her children in 1966.

Deemed unfit to stand trial, she was hospitalized at the Augusta State Hospital, from which she managed to escape in 1973, but died in an accident shortly afterwards.

== Early life ==
Constance Margaret Sirois was born on March 26, 1929, in Oakland, Maine. She was abandoned by her birth parents, and later adopted by the Sirois family. Neighbors described Constance as a pretty and nice girl, although she was also considered "moody".

In 1946, the 17-year-old Sirois married 24-year-old Carl Marion Fisher, a World War II veteran employed at a car shop on the Maine Central Railroad. The couple moved to a little home in Waterville, where they had three children: Richard (b. 1947), Daniel (b. 1948) and Deborah Kay (b. 1953).

During these years, Constance started to exhibit signs of anxiety and depression, frequently worrying about her children, money, and the cramped home the family lived in. She also attempted suicide on at least one occasion.

== Murders ==
=== First killings ===
On March 8, 1954, Carl returned home from work to find that the door had been locked. Worried that something was off, he contacted Dr. Richard Chasse, the physician who had been treating his wife for recent bouts of depression, and the men broke down the door. Carl then went inside and went to the bedroom, where he saw the corpses of Daniel and Deborah tucked in their beds, at first appearing to be asleep. He then stepped into the bathroom, where he found that his eldest son Richard had been drowned in the bathtub.

Panicked and unable to find his wife, he quickly contacted the authorities, who rushed to the crime scene. Officers searched the house and found Constance hidden under a bed, unconscious from drinking a bottle of liquid shampoo in a suicide attempt. A suicide note written by her was located, with Constance explaining that she had drowned the children to "save them from evil" and that God had ordered her to do so.

=== Internment and release ===
Constance was arrested and charged with murder. The killings came as a shock to the community, who struggled to believe that she was capable of doing such a thing. Before she was able to stand trial, a forensic psychiatric examination concluded that she was suffering from paranoid schizophrenia and was thus unable to stand trial.

Because of this, Constance was interned at the Augusta State Hospital in Augusta for treatment. While hospitalized there, she calmly explained that she had drowned the children one by one and she had done it because, as she claimed to one psychiatrist, "I wanted someone to baby me." In order to cure her, Fisher was given high doses of insulin injections, which would sometimes cause her to experience seizures.

Within a year of her internment, she started to show signs of improvement, no longer hearing voices or experiencing any auditory hallucinations. In 1955, her husband initiated a legal process to have her released, but his requests were denied by the hospital's medical board. After four years, partly due to a national effort to deinstitutionalize mental patients, Constance was released into her husband's custody on March 6, 1959.

The couple soon moved to a new home Carl had built for the family in Fairfield, where they would have three more children: Kathleen Louise (b. 1960), Michael Jon (b. 1962) and Natalie Rose (b. 1965).

=== Second killings ===
On June 30, 1966, Carl returned home from work only to find 9-month-old Natalie drowned in the bathtub. Shocked by the discovery, he ran towards the home of neighbor Howard Wood to use his telephone, as his home did not have one. Police were called to the scene, and after examining the crime scene, officers found the bodies of Michael and Kathleen tucked in their beds. Constance herself was also found lying in her bed, unconscious from an attempt to overdose on pills. Newspapers at the time noted the eerie similarities with the previous murders, calling it a "duplication of tragedy".

Constance was rushed to the Thayer Hospital in Waterville, where she regained consciousness. Local authorities sought to charge her with murder, and after she was discharged, Constance was brought to Skowhegan in Somerset County for deliberations between prosecutors, before a decision was made to try her in Kennebec County.

== Murder charges and hospitalization ==
Following her arraignment and while she was being held without bail, Attorney General Richard Dubord announced that the State would not request that the defendant undergo psychiatric treatment. Skowhegan-based attorney George W. Perkins was appointed as her attorney, while Dubord would be assisted by John Benoit and Richard Cohen. During a formal hearing, Dr. Price Kirkpatrick, a psychiatrist, stated that he believed that Constance suffered from bouts of depression because she had not been taking her medication properly.

After a day of testimonies from the prosecution and the defense, the court ordered that Constance must undergo a psychiatric examination at the Augusta State Hospital in order to determine how competent she was to stand trial. The results of said examination concluded that she was stable enough to stand trial, and Constance was soon charged with the murders of Kathleen, Michael and Natalie. During the reading of the third indictment, she sobbed as she entered her pleas of not guilty by reason of insanity, but soon regained her composure.

During the testimonies, the prosecution questioned several witnesses, including Capt. Albert Dross of the Waterville Police Department and Dr. Joseph J. Hiebel of the Thayer Hospital. Both men claimed that during interrogations with the defendant, she had given clear and cohesive answers to their inquiries, with Dross adding that he had found a gun and a knife in the house which he said Constance planned to kill herself with.

In spite of their attempts to have her convicted, her defense counsel managed to convince the court that Constance was insane, and the Judge eventually ruled that she should be confined to the Augusta State Hospital for the rest of her natural life.

=== Escape and death ===
During her hospitalization, Constance reportedly caused no problems and behaved well towards the staff. This all changed on October 1, 1973, when her husband Carl decided to stop visiting her, as it caused him too much grief. Not long after, she managed to escape from the Augusta State Hospital, prompting a search operation from hospital staff and local authorities.

On October 9, a group of duck hunters spotted the bloated body of a woman floating in the Kennebec River near Gardiner. An autopsy determined that the body belonged to Constance Fisher, and her death was listed as an accidental drowning, likely to have occurred on the day of her escape. Her death prompted the hospital's superintendent, Roy Ettlinger, to criticize the practice of milieu therapy on patients, as he believed this increased the risk of them committing suicide.

Constance's body was buried at the family's graveyard plot in Waterville. When Carl Fisher died in 1990, his body was also interred in the same plot as his wife and all of their six children.

== See also ==
- List of serial killers in the United States
- Andrea Yates – American murder defendant (born 1964)
- Young family killings – 1965 quintuple filicide in Hawaii

== Bibliography ==
- Bob Briggs (July 13, 2011). The Constance Fisher Tragedy. AuthorHouse. ISBN 9781456756468.
