= Ben Bubar =

Ben Bubar may refer to:

- Benjamin Bubar Sr. (1878–1967), American United Baptist minister and politician
- Benjamin Bubar Jr. (1917–1995), American politician
