= Messalonskee Lake =

Lake in Maine, United States

- Snow Pond
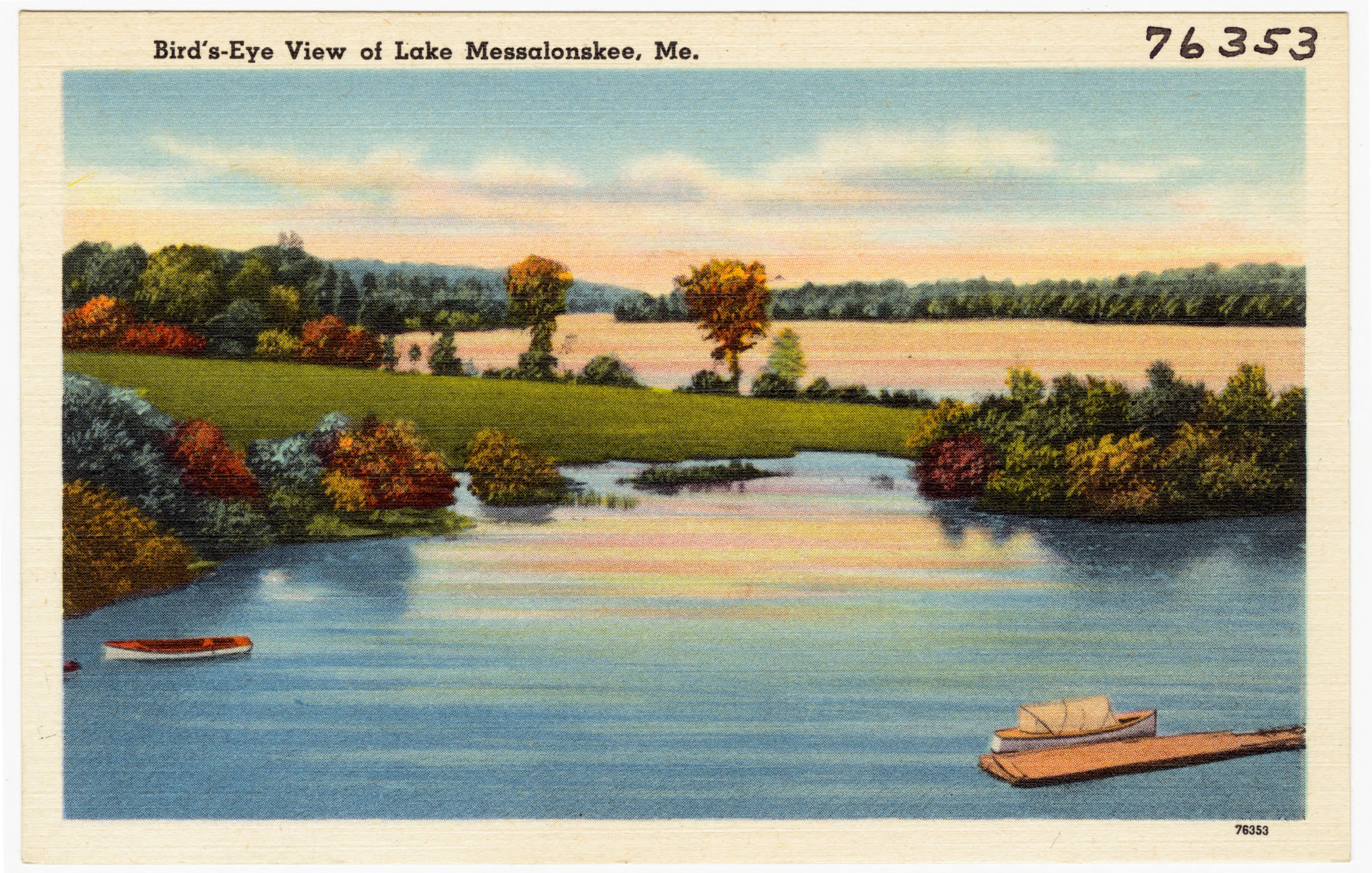
- Postcard view

- Location within Maine Location within the United States

- Location: Belgrade Lakes Region, Maine
- Coordinates: 44°29′N 69°47′W
- Type: Dimictic, marginally eutrophic
- Primary inflows: Belgrade Stream
- Primary outflows: Messalonskee Stream
- Catchment area: 177 sq mi (460 km^{2})
- Basin countries: United States
- Max. length: 8.3 mi (13.4 km)
- Max. width: 1.4 mi (2.3 km)
- Surface area: 3,510 acres (1,419 ha)
- Average depth: 33 ft (10 m)
- Max. depth: 113 ft (34 m)
- Water volume: 110,427 acre⋅ft (136,210,000 m^{3})
- Residence time: 0.63 years
- Shore length^{1}: 30 mi (48 km)
- Surface elevation: 234 ft (71 m)
- Frozen: Ice-Out; Earliest: Mar 31, 1985; Latest: May 7, 1940
- Islands: Blake; Napa; Greeley; Midway
- Settlements: Belgrade, Maine; Oakland, Maine; Sidney, Maine
- ^{1} Shore length is not a well-defined measure.

Messalonskee Lake is a body of water in the Belgrade Lakes region of Maine. It is bordered by the towns of Oakland, Sidney, and Belgrade. The lake is a 9 miles (14 km) long, narrow, natural creation, resulting from continental collision and glacial scouring. A dam originally built in the town of Oakland in 1905 increased the lake's size.

In the first part of the 20th century, Messalonskee Stream provided waterpower for Oakland's Cascade Woolen Mill, as well as for a number of factories responsible for Oakland's long-defunct title as "axehead capital of the world."

Messalonskee Lake is home to a great variety of wildlife, including great blue herons, bass, yellow perch, white perch, sunfish, painted and snapping turtles, loons, and occasionally Bald Eagles can be seen soaring above the lake. The surrounding community has recently formed the Messalonskee Lake Association in the interest of its protection and preservation.

Like some Maine lakes, Messalonskee Lake has seen infestations of Milfoil.

The lake is also more commonly called "Snow Pond", a reference to Philip Snow who settled in the area in 1774.

Many summer camps and related tourist accommodations are located on Messalonskee Lake, among them the New England Music Camp, which was founded in 1937.
