= 1936 Maine gubernatorial election =

- September 14, 1936
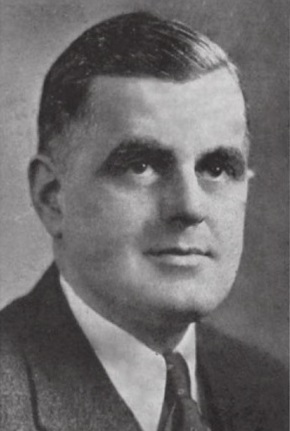

Nominee	Lewis O. Barrows	F. Harold Dubord
Party	Republican	Democratic
Popular vote	173,716	130,466
Percentage	56.03%	42.07%
- County results Barrows: 50–60% 60–70% Dubord: 40–50% 50–60%
Governor before election
Louis J. Brann
Democratic
Elected Governor
Lewis O. Barrows
Republican

The 1936 Maine gubernatorial election took place on September 14, 1936. Incumbent Democratic Governor Louis J. Brann did not seek re-election, and instead ran for the United States Senate. Republican Lewis O. Barrows defeated Democratic Party candidate F. Harold Dubord and Republican state legislator and Baptist minister Benjamin Bubar Sr., who ran as an independent. Bubar's son Ben Bubar was later elected to the state legislature at 21 and later twice served as the Prohibition Party's presidential candidate.

Barrows' victory was the start of a streak of nine consecutive Republican gubernatorial election victories.

== Results ==
1936 Gubernatorial Election, Maine
Party	Candidate	Votes	%	±%
Republican	Lewis O. Barrows	173,716	56.03%	
Democratic	F. Harold Dubord	130,466	42.07%	
Independent	Benjamin Bubar Sr.	5,862	1.89%	
Majority		42,350	13.96%	
