= Martin Bartlett =

Martin Bartlett may refer to:

- Martin Bartlett (Home and Away), a character on the television soap opera Home and Away
- Martin F. Bartlett (1864–1918), American politician from Maine
- Martin James Bartlett (born 1996), English classical pianist
