= Senator Bartlett =

Senator Bartlett may refer to:

== Members of the United States Senate ==
- Bob Bartlett (1904–1968), U.S. Senator from Alaska from 1959 to 1968
- Dewey F. Bartlett (1919–1979), U.S. Senator from Oklahoma from 1973 to 1979

== United States state senate members ==
- Bailey Bartlett (1750–1830), Massachusetts State Senate
- Charles H. Bartlett (1833–1900), New Hampshire State Senate
- Charles L. Bartlett (Georgia politician) (1853–1938), Georgia State Senate
- Ichabod Bartlett (1786–1853), New Hampshire
- Josiah Bartlett Jr. (1768–1838), New Hampshire State Senate
- M. D. Bartlett, Wisconsin State Senate
- Martin F. Bartlett, Maine State Senate
- Oscar Bartlett (1823–1911), Wisconsin State Senate
- Phil Bartlett (born 1976), Maine State Senate
- Susan Bartlett (born 1946), Vermont State Senate
- T. Kevan Bartlett (fl. 2020s), West Virginia State Senate
- Thomas Bartlett Jr. (1808–1876), Vermont State Senate
- Washington Bartlett (1824–1887), California State Senate
- William S. Bartlett Jr., New Hampshire State Senate

== Others ==
- Andrew Bartlett (born 1964), Senate of Australia
- Manuel Bartlett (born 1936), Senate of Mexico
