= Hubert C. Kueter =

German-born American writer (1930–2025)

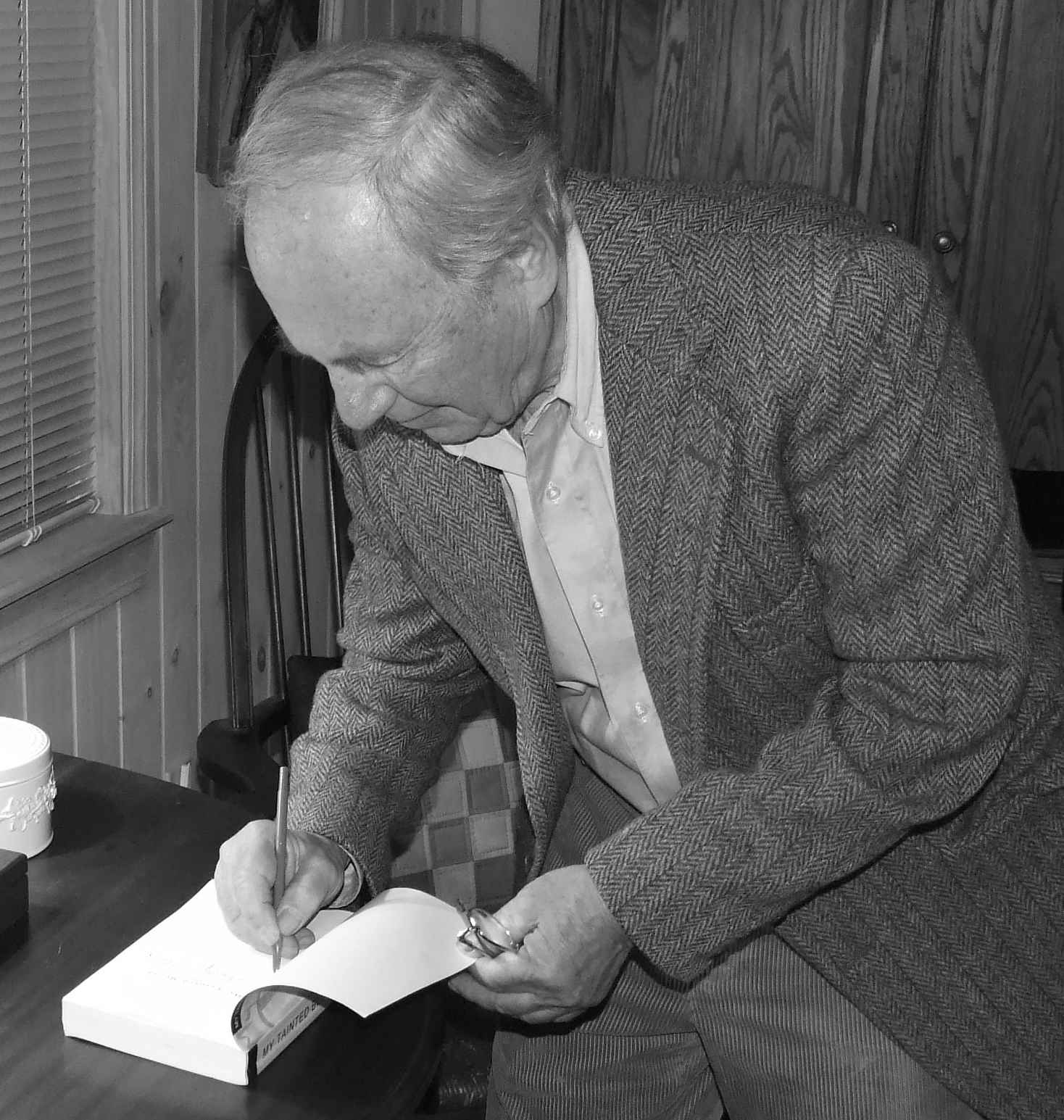
- Born: Hubert Christian Kueter; 1930; Breslau, Germany
- Died: August 1, 2025 (aged 94); Oakland, Maine, U.S.
- Occupations: Writer, academic
- Writing career
- Period: 2008–2025
- Notable work: My Tainted Blood (2008)

Hubert Christian Kueter (1930 – August 1, 2025) was a German-born American writer and academic, who was the author of My Tainted Blood, which chronicles his childhood in World War II era Germany. He was also a professor emeritus at Colby College.

My Tainted Blood has been described as being written in the style of magic realism. It follows the author's adventures and exploits as a boy and teenager in wartime Breslau and postwar Germany. The incorporation of the author's love of food and cooking is also a notable feature of this work.

Kueter taught German language and literature at Colby College from 1965 to 1997. From 1975 to 2003 he was also the owner/manager/chef of the Johann Sebastian B Restaurant in Oakland, Maine.

Kueter died in Oakland, Maine on August 1, 2025, at the age of 94.

== Bibliography ==
- Kueter, Hubert C. My Tainted Blood, Polar Bear & Company, 2008: ISBN 978-1-882190-88-1.
