= F. Harold Dubord =

American judge

Maine Supreme Judicial Court
- In office October 4, 1956 – December 10, 1962
- Appointed by: Edmund Muskie
- Preceded by: Percy T. Clarke
- Succeeded by: Harold C. Marden

27th Mayor of Waterville, Maine
- In office 1928–1932
- Preceded by: Herbert Carlyle Libby
- Succeeded by: L. Eugene Thayer

Personal details
- Born: Frederik Harold Dubord; December 14, 1891
- Died: October 14, 1964 (aged 72)
- Party: Democratic
- Children: 3, including Richard

Frederik Harold Dubord (December 14, 1891 – October 14, 1964) was an American attorney and politician from Maine who served as a justice of the Maine Supreme Judicial Court from 1956 to 1962. Previous to that, Dubord served five terms as the mayor of Waterville, Maine, from 1928 to 1932. In 1936, Dubord was the Maine Democratic Party's nominee for governor, which he lost to Republican Lewis O. Barrows.

Born in Waterville, Maine, to Harry and Mary (Poulin) Dubord, his father was a local government official, and his mother died during his childhood. Dubord attended Colby College, and the University of Maine School of Law, receiving his law degree from the Boston University School of Law in 1922.

On June 29, 1955, Dubord was appointed as a justice to the Maine Superior Court by old friend and governor Edmund Muskie. A year later, on October 4, 1956, he was appointed by Governor Muskie to a seat on the Maine Supreme Judicial Court vacated by the retirement of Justice Percy T. Clarke. He retired from that position on December 10, 1962.

On May 14, 1917, Dubord married Blanche Letourneau, with whom he had two sons and a daughter. One son, Richard J. Dubord, served as mayor of Waterville and Maine Attorney General.

Party political offices
Preceded by Herbert E. Holmes	Democratic nominee for U.S. senator from Maine (Class 1); 1934	Succeeded by Louis J. Brann
Preceded by Louis J. Brann	Democratic nominee for Governor of Maine; 1936	Succeeded by Louis J. Brann
