= List of mayors of Waterville, Maine =

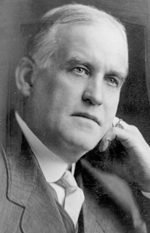
Charles Fletcher Johnson served as the 4th mayor in 1893.

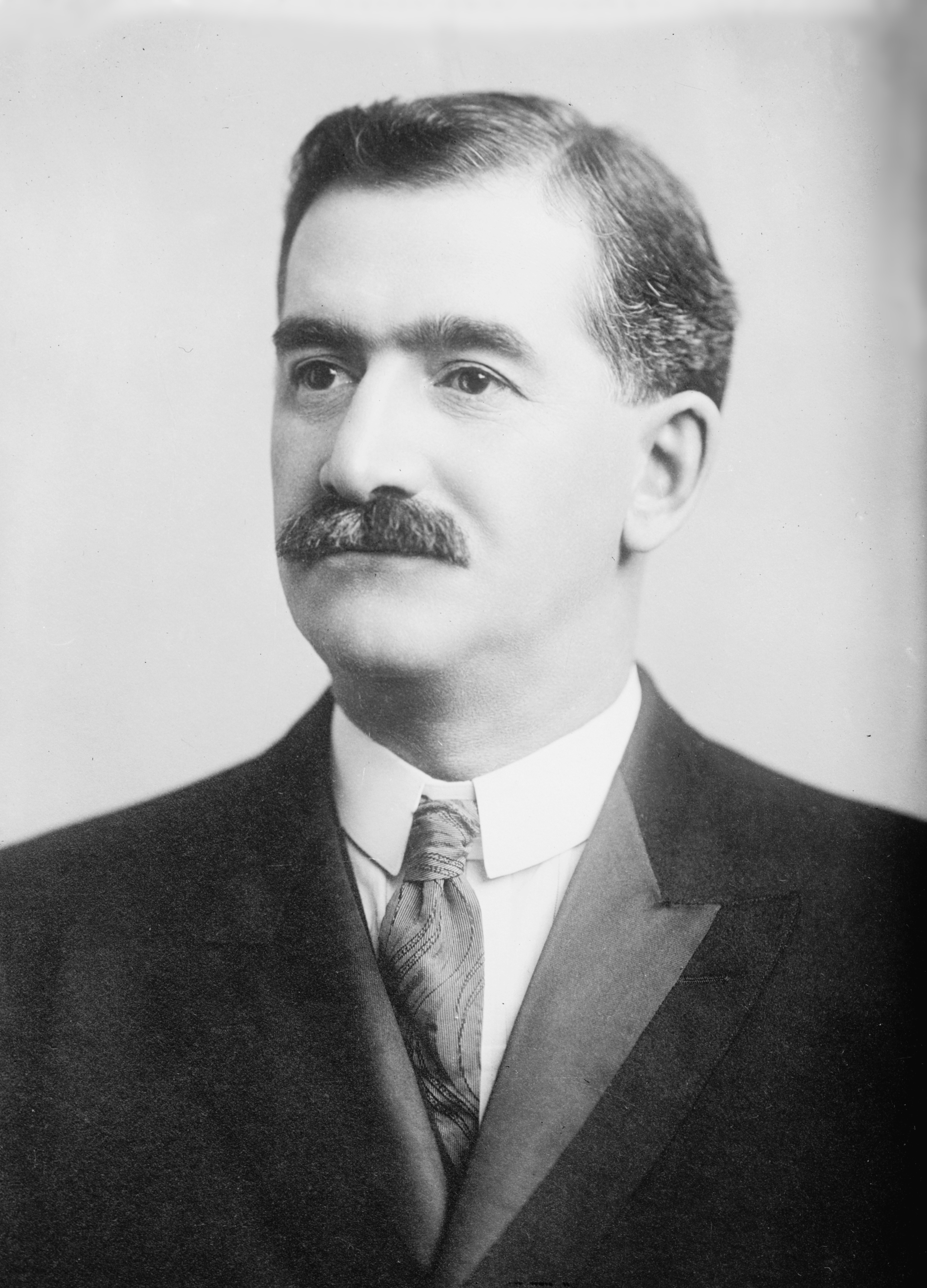
William Robinson Pattangall was mayor from 1911 to 1913.

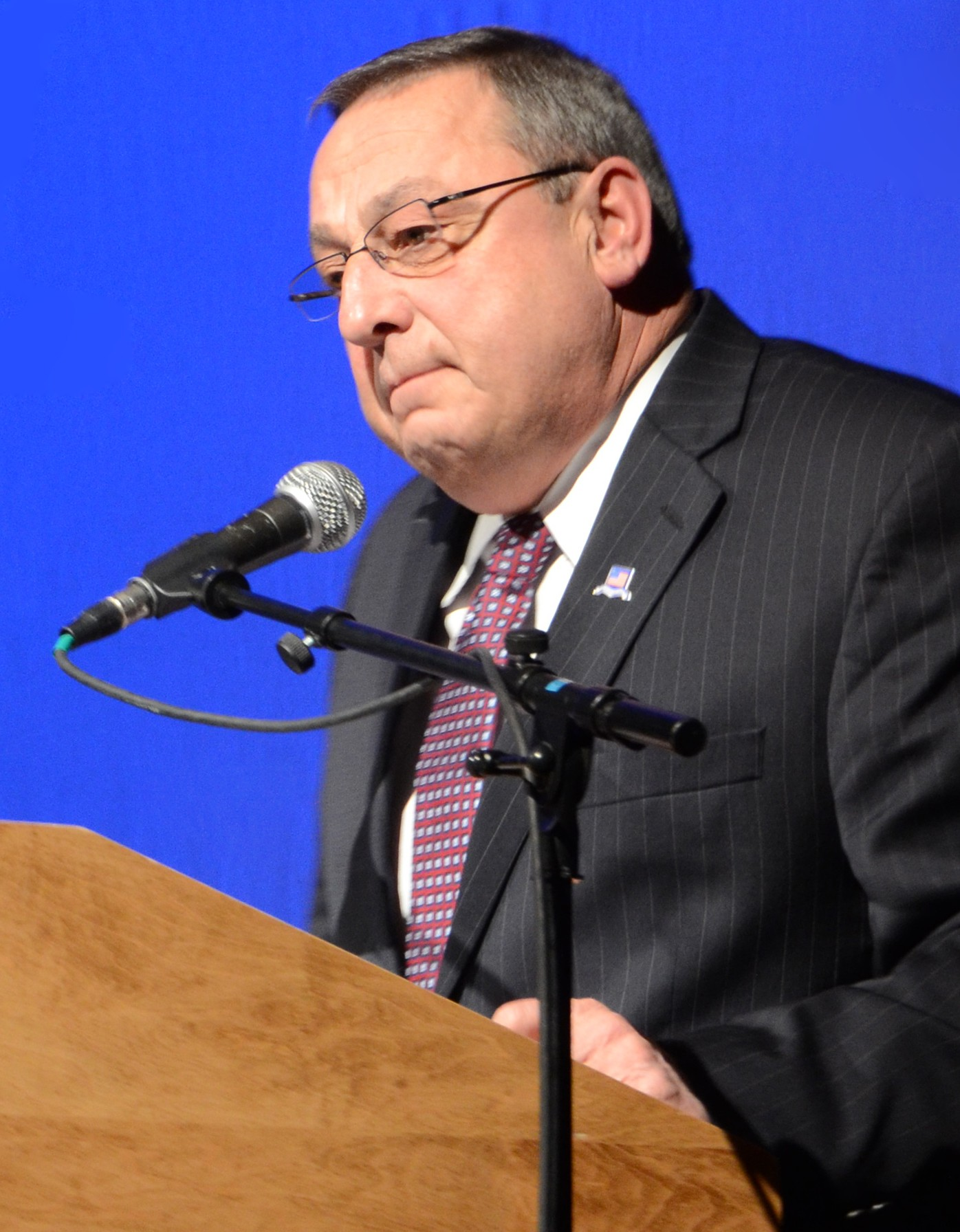
Paul LePage served as mayor from 2004 to 2011.

Below is a list of mayors of Waterville, Maine, USA.

#	Mayor	Term	Party	Notes
1	Reuben Foster	1888	Republican	Member of the Maine House of Representatives from 1866 to 1867 and 1870; Member of the Maine Senate from 1871 to 1872.
2	Nathaniel Meader	1889–1890	Republican	
3	Edgar L. Jones	1891–1892	Democratic	
4	Charles Fletcher Johnson	1893	Democratic	Member of the Maine House of Representatives from 1906 to 1907; United States Senator from Maine from 1911 to 1917; Judge of the United States Court of Appeals for the First Circuit from 1917 to 1930.
5	Christian Knauff	1894–95	Republican	
6	Edmund F. Webb	1896	Republican	Previously speaker of the Maine House of Representatives and president of the Maine Senate.
7	Charles H. Redington	1897	Democratic	
8	Carroll Waite Abbott	1898	Republican	
9	Warren C. Philbrook	1899–1900	Republican	Member of the Maine House of Representatives from 1897 to 1899; Attorney General of Maine from 1909 to 1910; Justice of the Maine Supreme Court from 1917 to 1928.
10	Martin Blaisdell	1901–1902	Republican	
11	Cyrus W. Davis	1903–1904	Democratic	Secretary of State of Maine from 1911 to 1912.
12	Horace Purinton	1905	Republican	
13	Edgar L. Jones	1906	Democratic	Second tenure as mayor.
14	Luther G. Bunker	1907–1908	Republican	
15	Frank Redington	1909	Republican	
16	Norman K. Fuller	1910	Democratic	
17	William Robinson Pattangall	1911–1913	Democratic	Attorney General of Maine from 1911 to 1913; Justice of the Maine Supreme Judicial Court from 1926 to 1935, Chief Justice from 1931 to 1935. Later became a Republican.
18	Louis E. Hilliard	1914	Democratic	
19	Martin F. Bartlett	1915	Republican	Member of the Maine Senate from 1915 to 1918.
20	Frederic E. Boothby	1916	Republican	Mayor of Portland from 1901 to 1903.
21	Ora A. Meader	1917	Democratic	
22	Everett Cleveland Wardwell	1918–1920	Republican	
23	Ernest Edwin Finnimore	1921–1922	Democratic	
24	Leon O. Tebbetts	1923–1924	Democratic	
25	Paul Revere Baird	1925	Republican	
26	Herbert Carlyle Libby	1926–1927	Republican	
27	Frederick Harold Dubord	1928–1932	Democratic	Democratic Party nominee for Governor of Maine in 1936; Justice of the Maine Superior Court from 1955 to 1956; Justice of the Maine Supreme Judicial Court from 1956 to 1962.
28	L. Eugene Thayer	1933–1934	Democratic	
29	Robert M. Jackson	1935–1937	Democratic	
30	Paul A. Dundas	1938–1943	Democratic	
31	George J. Doyle	1944–1945	Democratic	
32	H. Chesterfield Marden	1946–1947	Republican	
33	Russell Squire	1948–1951	Republican	
34	Richard J. Dubord	1952–1955	Democratic	
35	Clinton A. Clauson	1956–1957	Democratic	Governor of Maine from January 6 – December 30, 1959.
36	Albert Bernier	1958–1961	Democratic	
37	Cyril Joly Jr.	1962–1965	Republican	
38	Malcolm Fortier	1966–1967	Democratic	
39	Donald Marden	1968–1969	Republican	
40	Richard 'Spike' Carey	1970–1978	Democratic	Member of the Maine House of Representatives from 1967 to 1978; Member of the Maine Senate from 1992 to 2000.
41	Paul LaVerdiere	1978–1982	Republican	
42	Ann Gilbridge Hill	1982–1986	Democratic	
43	Thomas Nale	1986–1987	Democratic	
44	Judy Kany	1988–1989	Democratic	Member of the Maine House of Representatives from 1975 to 1982; Member of the Maine Senate from 1983 to 1992.
45	David Bernier	1990–1993	Democratic	
46	Thomas Brazier	1994–1995	Democratic	
47	Nelson Megna	1995–1996	Democratic	
48	Ruth Joseph	1996–1998	Democratic	
49	Nelson Madore	1999–2003	Democratic	
50	Paul LePage	2004–2011	Republican	Governor of Maine from 2011 to 2019.
51	Dana W. Sennett	2011	Democratic	
52	Karen Heck	2012–2014	Independent	
53	Nicholas Isgro	2015–2020	Republican	
54	Jay Coelho	2021–2022	Democratic	
55	Mike Morris	2023–present	Democratic	
