= Judy Kany =

American politician

Judy C. Kany (born June 29, 1937) is an American politician from Maine. Kany, a Democrat from Waterville, Maine, served in Maine House of Representatives (1975-1982) and the Maine Senate (1983-1992). In 1988–89, Kany served as the 44th Mayor of Waterville.

Kany earned a Bachelor of Business Administration from the University of Michigan and a Master of Public Administration from the University of Maine. Besides her time in the Maine Legislature, Kany served as chair of Maine's Advisory Commission on Radioactive Waste (1981–87).
