= Richard Dubord =

American politician (1921–1970)

Maine Attorney General
- In office 1965–1966
- Preceded by: Frank E. Hancock
- Succeeded by: James Erwin

Mayor of Waterville, Maine
- In office 1952–1955
- Preceded by: Russell Squire
- Succeeded by: Clinton Clauson

Personal details
- Born: November 17, 1921 Waterville, Maine, U.S.
- Died: January 2, 1970 (aged 48) Boston, Massachusetts, U.S.
- Party: Democratic
- Parent(s): F. Harold and Blanche (Letourneau) Dubord
- Education: College of the Holy Cross (BS); Boston University (LLB)

Richard J. Dubord (November 17, 1921 – January 2, 1970) was an American attorney and politician who served as attorney general of Maine from 1965 to 1966. A member of the Democratic Party, he was the mayor of Waterville, Maine, from 1952 to 1955.

== Early life ==
Dubord was born on November 17, 1921 in Waterville to F. Harold and Blanche (Letourneau) Dubord. He earned his Bachelor of Science from the College of the Holy Cross in 1943. On September 2, 1943, he married Evelyn P. Parnell. They had three children. During World War II, he served in China with the United States Army Air Forces. In 1948, he earned his Bachelor of Laws from the Boston University School of Law and was admitted to the Maine bar.

== Career ==
In 1951, Dubord was the Democratic nominee for mayor of Waterville. He defeated Republican A. Raymond Rogers 3,841 votes to 3,149 to become the city's first Democratic mayor in six years. At 30 years old, he was the youngest mayor in Waterville's history, breaking the record previously held by his father, who was 33 when he was elected in 1933. He was reelected in 1953 by a record plurality of 1,930 votes. He was the first Democratic mayoral candidate in 20 years to win all seven of the city's wards. He did not run for a third term in 1955.

In 1956, Dubord was selected to be Maine's Democratic national committeeman by the Democratic state committee. He was chosen in an 18 to 9 vote over Kenneth Colbath. Dubord succeeded Edmund Muskie, who resigned to focus on his duties as Governor of Maine. He served three terms and did not run for reelection in 1968.

Dubord was a candidate in the 1962 Maine gubernatorial election, but lost the June 18 Democratic primary to Maynard C. Dolloff 18,234 votes to 18,007. He conceded the race on July 17 after recounts in York and Androscoggin Counties only increased Dolloff's margin of victory.

Following the Democratic Party's victory in the 1964 Maine legislative elections, Dubord announced his canidadicy for Maine Attorney General. He defeated former Republican state senator Ralph W. Farris Jr. 115 votes to 68 in a vote that mostly went along party lines. The Republicans returned to power in 1967 and Dubord was succeeded by James S. Erwin.

Dubord was chairman of the subcommittee that examined the credentials of delegates to the 1968 Democratic National Convention and, the following year, was appointed to a 27‐member commission that reviewed the party’s convention rules.

== Death ==
On December 24, 1969, Dubord suffered a stroke after a blood vessel in the back of his head ruptured. He was transferred to a Boston hospital and underwent surgery on January 1, 1970. He died the following day at the age of 48.
