= Rachel Bubar Kelly =

American politician (1922–2002)

- Born: November 22, 1922
- Died: January 14, 2002 (aged 79)
- Education: Colby College
- Occupation: Politician
- Political party: Prohibition
- Father: Benjamin Bubar Sr.
- Relatives: Benjamin Bubar Jr. (brother)

Rachel Bubar Kelly (November 22, 1922 – January 14, 2002) was the Prohibition Party candidate for United States Vice President in the 1996 presidential election as the running mate of Earl F. Dodge. Dodge previously been the running mate of her brother Ben Bubar.

Kelly was a graduate of Colby College (1947) and served as President of the Women's Christian Temperance Union from 1988 to 1996.

Party political offices
Preceded by George Ormsby	Prohibition Party vice presidential candidate 1996 (lost)	Succeeded by W. Dean Watkins
