= Benjamin Bubar Jr. =

American minister and politician

Ben Bubar

Member of the Maine House of Representatives
- In office 1939–1945

Personal details
- Born: Benjamin Calvin Bubar Jr. June 17, 1917 Blaine, Maine, U.S.
- Died: May 15, 1995 (aged 77) Waterville, Maine, U.S.
- Party: Prohibition (after 1950s)
- Other political affiliations: Republican (until 1950s)
- Spouse: Virginia Ireland
- Children: 2
- Parent: Benjamin Bubar Sr. (father)
- Relatives: Rachel Bubar Kelly (sister)

Benjamin Calvin Bubar Jr. (June 17, 1917 – May 15, 1995), also known as Ben Bubar, was an ordained minister who was the youngest person ever to win election to the Maine House of Representatives at age twenty-one and served as the Prohibition Party's presidential candidate in 1976 and 1980 and was the last elected official to do so until James Hedges in 2016.

== Life ==
Benjamin Calvin Bubar Jr. was born on June 17, 1917, in Blaine, Maine to Benjamin Bubar Sr. and Mary Louise Heal. His father was the first ordained United Baptist minister in Maine and was active in politics. His father served as a member of the Maine House of Representatives, ran as an independent candidate in the 1936 gubernatorial election receiving 5,862 votes, and was a speaker at Ku Klux Klan rallies. On February 14, 1946, he married Virginia Ireland, with whom he had two children. He moved to China, Maine in 1952, and began working for the Maine Christian Civic League where he would serve as superintendent from 1954 to 1984.

Bubar ran for a seat in the state house in the 1938 election, despite not being able to vote as his twenty-first birthday was three days after the primary election, as a member of the Republican Party. He and his three friends were critical of the incumbent, who was sixty years old, and drew straws to decide who should run against him with Bubar winning. He won in the election becoming the youngest person to serve in the state legislature and served from 1939 to 1945. He was serving as the chair of the board of selectmen in his area by 1945. He created a weekly newspaper in Mars Hill, Maine, and later sold it.

Bubar's father and grandfather had been members of the Prohibition Party and Bubar Sr. cast his first vote for a Prohibitionist candidate. Bubar joined the party in the 1950s. During the 1976 and 1980 presidential elections he was the National Statesman Party's (Note: The name of the Prohibition Party at the time.) presidential nominee with chairman Earl Dodge as his vice presidential running mate and is the most recent nominee to receive over 10,000 votes. He was on the ballot in fourteen states in the 1976 election and campaigned in all of them, but was only on the ballot in eight states in the 1980 election and did not actively campaign due to a lack of funds. He criticized Dodge's leadership of the party and blamed him for its decreased support in presidential elections due to his mismanagement of funds and possible theft which would eventually result in him being ousted as chairman in 2003.

Bubar died on May 15, 1995, in Waterville, Maine from a heart attack after suffering from Parkinson's disease.

== Notes ==
Party political offices
Preceded by E. Harold Munn	Prohibition Party Presidential candidate 1976, 1980	Succeeded by Earl F. Dodge
