= Waterville Regional Airport =

Airport in Maine, U.S.

- IATA: WVL; ICAO: KWVL; FAA LID: WVL

Summary
- Airport type: Public
- Operator: City of Waterville
- Location: Waterville, Maine
- Elevation AMSL: 333 ft (101 m)
- Coordinates: 44°32′0″N 69°40′32″W
- Website: https://www.waterville-me.gov/183/Airport
- Interactive map of Waterville Regional Airport

Runways
Direction	Length		Surface
Direction	ft	m	Surface
5/23	5,500	1,676	Asphalt
14/32	2,301	701	Asphalt

Waterville Regional Airport (IATA: WVL, ICAO: KWVL, FAA LID: WVL) is a general aviation airport located two miles (3 km) southwest of the central business district (CBD) of Waterville, a city in Kennebec County, Maine, United States. The airport covers 350 acres (142 ha) and has two runways (14/32 and 5/23). The facility was formerly named Waterville Robert LaFleur Airport.

As of July 2026, it is not served by any passenger airline service, though UPS (operated by Ameriflight) does serve the airport daily. Scheduled passenger service was available on Air New England in the 1970s and Northeast Express Regional Airlines in the 1980s.

In 2022, it was announced that the airport would receive $300,000 from the Department of Transportation (DOT) to update its master plan case study as part of the DOT's Fiscal Year 2022 Airport Improvement Program.

== See also ==
- List of airports in Maine
