= Oakland, Maine =

Town in Maine, United States

- Town
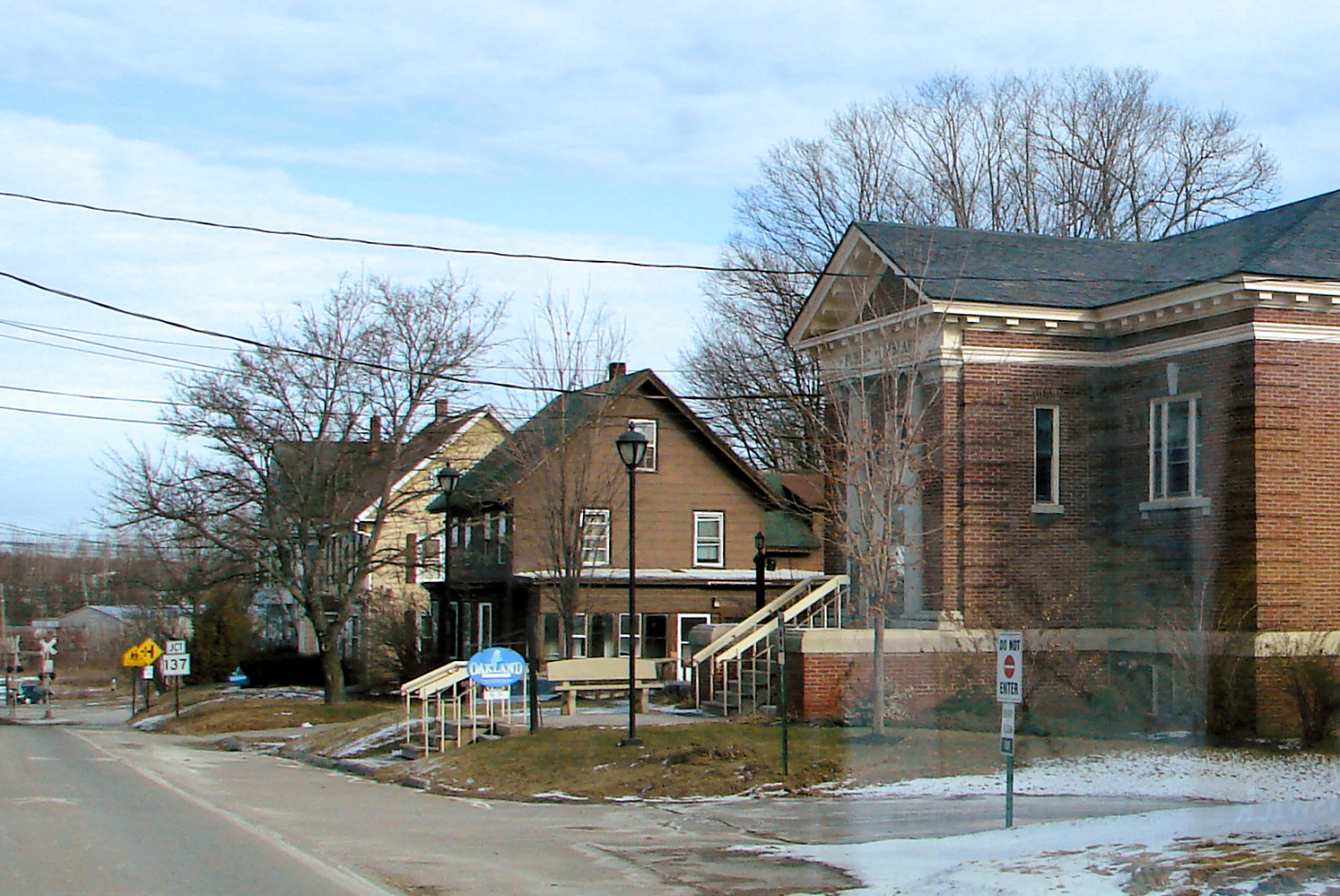
- Oakland, Maine in January 2012

- Seal

- Location in Kennebec County and the state of Maine.
- Coordinates: 44.548°N 69.713°W
- Country: United States
- State: Maine
- County: Kennebec
- Incorporated: 1873
- Village: Oakland

Area
  - Total: 28.17 sq mi (72.96 km^{2})
  - Land: 25.67 sq mi (66.48 km^{2})
  - Water: 2.50 sq mi (6.47 km^{2})
- Elevation: 456 ft (139 m)

Population (2020)
  - Total: 6,230
  - Density: 243/sq mi (93.7/km^{2})
- Time zone: UTC-5 (Eastern (EST))
  - Summer (DST): UTC-4 (EDT)
- ZIP code: 04963
- Area code: 207
- FIPS code: 23-54560
- GNIS feature ID: 582645
- Website: www.oaklandmaine.us

Oakland is a town in Kennebec County in the U.S. state of Maine. The population was 6,230 at the 2020 census. Oakland is 4 miles (6 km) west of Waterville and approximately 18 miles (29 km) north of Augusta, the state capital.

== History ==
The area that is now Oakland was first settled in about 1780 by colonists of English descent from Massachusetts and New Hampshire. At that time, the region was known as Taconnet after Indian Chief Taconnet, an Abenaki nation sachem. Farmers found the area's fertile soil good for cultivation, grazing and dairy farming, while the water power provided by the Messalonskee Stream was useful for manufacturers. The area was incorporated by the Massachusetts General Court in 1771 as part of Winslow. In 1802, the area of Winslow west of the Kennebec River was incorporated as Waterville.

The Androscoggin and Kennebec Railroad arrived in 1849, spurring Waterville to boom as a mill town. With several manufacturers of farm implements, it became known as the axe and scythe capital of New England. Other factories produced canned goods, tinware, carriages, furniture, tools, machinery, woolens, lumber, coffins, leather, boots and shoes. There was a granite quarry.

In the 1870s, manufacturers in the western section of Waterville, unhappy with taxation in the town, petitioned the Maine State Legislature to designate their industrial district as a separate town. In 1872, Oakland became the southern terminal of the Somerset Railroad, connecting first to North Anson, then to Bingham, and finally to Moosehead Lake. On February 26, 1873, the area was incorporated as West Waterville. In 1883, it was renamed Oakland.

The town's ponds and lakes are home to a number of summer camps. Downtown contains some notable architecture, including Memorial Hall, built in 1870, and the Oakland Public Library, a Carnegie library built between 1913 and 1915. Both are listed on the National Register of Historic Places. The completion of Interstate 95 in the 1960s increased Oakland's relationship with the Augusta area, and to some extent the Greater Portland and Bangor areas.

Oakland was also the birthplace of Constance Fisher, a schizophrenic serial killer who killed her six children

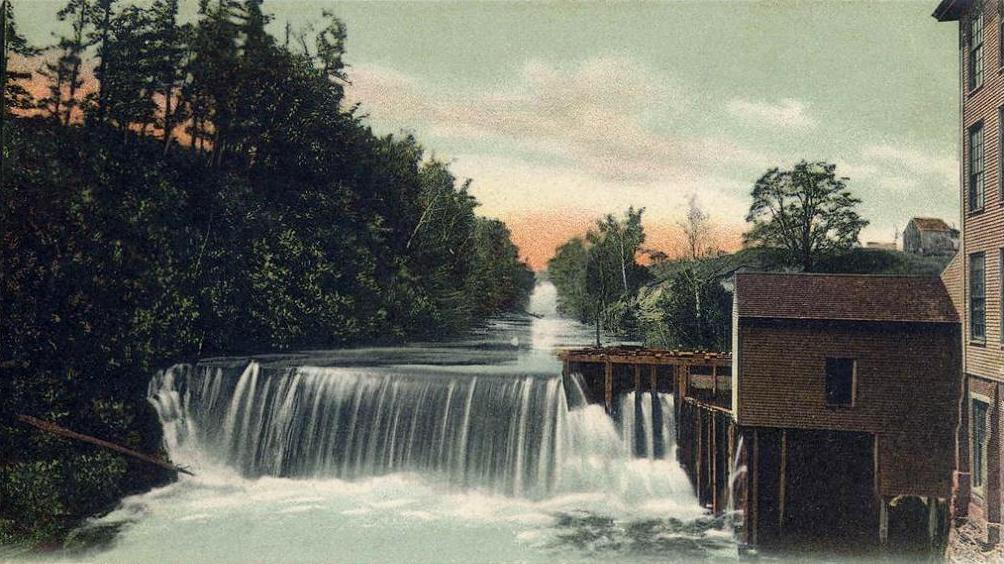
Messalonskee Stream c. 1906

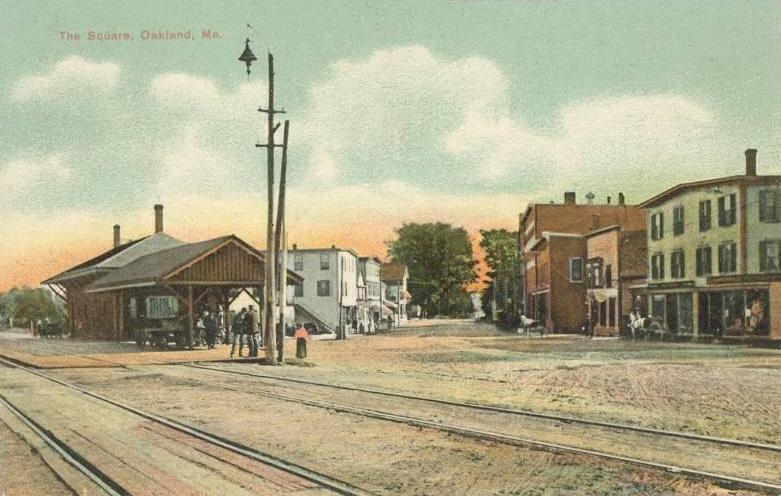
Depot Square in 1908

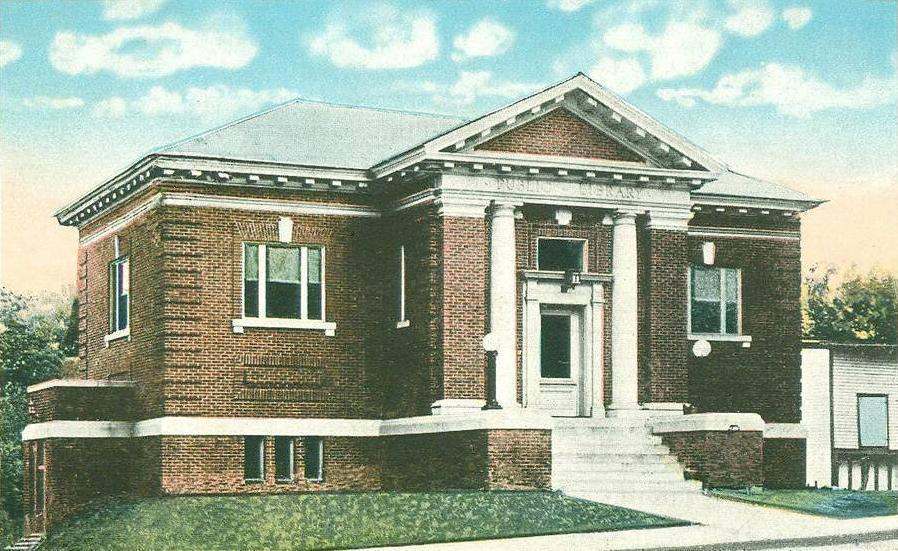
Oakland Public Library c. 1920

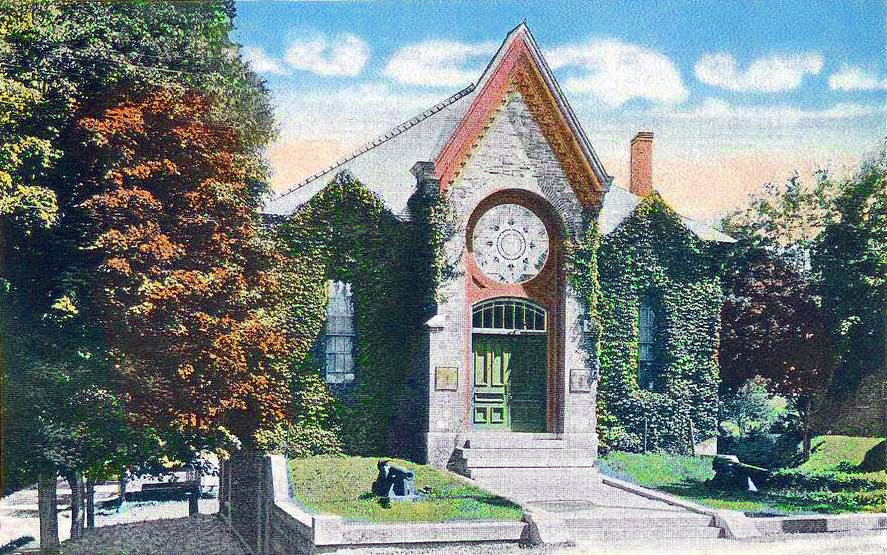
Memorial Hall c. 1920

== Geography ==
According to the United States Census Bureau, the town has a total area of 28.17 square miles (72.96 km^{2}), of which 25.67 square miles (66.48 km^{2}) is land and 2.50 square miles (6.47 km^{2}) is water. Oakland is drained by four major waterways: McGrath Pond, Salmon Lake, East Pond and Messalonskee Lake and Stream.

The town is crossed by Interstate 95, and state routes 11, 23 and 137. It borders the towns of Belgrade to the southwest, Smithfield to the northwest, Fairfield to the north, Waterville to the east, and Sidney to the south.

== Demographics ==
Historical population
Census	Pop.	Note	%±
1880	1,647		—
1890	2,044		24.1%
1900	1,913		−6.4%
1910	2,257		18.0%
1920	2,473		9.6%
1930	2,664		7.7%
1940	2,730		2.5%
1950	2,679		−1.9%
1960	3,075		14.8%
1970	3,535		15.0%
1980	5,162		46.0%
1990	5,595		8.4%
2000	5,959		6.5%
2010	6,240		4.7%
2020	6,230		−0.2%
U.S. Decennial Census

=== 2010 census ===
As of the census of 2010, there were 6,240 people, 2,543 households, and 1,793 families living in the town. The population density was 243.1 inhabitants per square mile (93.9/km^{2}). There were 3,024 housing units at an average density of 117.8 per square mile (45.5/km^{2}). The racial makeup of the town was 96.7% White, 0.4% African American, 0.4% Native American, 0.9% Asian, 0.1% Pacific Islander, 0.3% from other races, and 1.1% from two or more races. Hispanic or Latino of any race were 1.3% of the population.

There were 2,543 households, of which 32.2% had children under the age of 18 living with them, 53.6% were married couples living together, 11.7% had a female householder with no husband present, 5.3% had a male householder with no wife present, and 29.5% were non-families. 22.8% of all households were made up of individuals, and 7.4% had someone living alone who was 65 years of age or older. The average household size was 2.45 and the average family size was 2.83.

The median age in the town was 42.3 years. 22.8% of residents were under the age of 18; 7.4% were between the ages of 18 and 24; 23.9% were from 25 to 44; 32.5% were from 45 to 64; and 13.2% were 65 years of age or older. The gender makeup of the town was 48.5% male and 51.5% female.

=== 2000 census ===
As of the census of 2000, there were 5,959 people, 2,352 households, and 1,651 families living in the town. The population density was 231.5 inhabitants per square mile (89.4/km^{2}). There were 2,847 housing units at an average density of 110.6 per square mile (42.7/km^{2}). The racial makeup of the town was 98.27% White, 0.15% Black or African American, 0.23% Native American, 0.55% Asian, 0.08% from other races, and 0.70% from two or more races. Hispanic or Latino of any race were 0.52% of the population.

There were 2,352 households, out of which 35.6% had children under the age of 18 living in them, 54.9% had married couples living together, 11.1% had a female householder with no husband present, and 29.8% had non-families. 23.6% of all households were made up of individuals, and 8.8% had someone living alone who was 65 years of age or older. The average household size was 2.53, and the average family size was 2.98.

In the town, the population was spread out such that 26.9% were under the age of 18, 7.5% from were between 18 and 24 years, 30.2% were between 25 and 44 years, 24.4% were between 45 and 64 years, and 11.0% were 65 years of age or older. The median age was 37 years. For every 100 females, there were 95.8 males. For every 100 females aged 18 and over, there were 92.6 males.

The median income for a household in the town was $34,934, and the median income for a family was $43,654. Males had a median income of $33,382, and females had a median income of $24,286. The per capita income for the town was $19,406. About 9.0% of families and 10.1% of the population were below the poverty line, including 11.4% of those under age 18 and 4.9% of those aged 65 or over.

Oakland is also home to R.S.U. 18 – the local school district. There is Messalonskee High School, which enrolls around 700 students, and has an 826-seat J. Duke Albanneese Performing Arts Center.

== Education ==
The town is home to the Messalonskee High School.

== Sites of interest ==
- Memorial Hall
- Oakland Area Historical Society & Museum
