= Martin F. Bartlett =

American politician

Member of the Maine Senate
- In office 1915–1918

Personal details
- Party: Republican

Martin F. Bartlett (May 4, 1864 – July 18, 1918) was an American politician from Maine. Bartlett, a Republican, served one term as mayor of Waterville, Maine (1915) and two terms in the Maine Senate (1915-1918).

In the March 1915 mayoral election, Bartlett defeated Democrat Edman P. Fish 1,297 to 1,061.
