= Benjamin Bubar Sr. =

American United Baptist minister and politician

Benjamin Calvin Bubar Sr. (1878-July 4, 1967) was an American United Baptist minister and politician from Maine. After studying Billy Sunday, Bubar was a leading fundamentalist leader in Maine.

== Personal life and family ==
Bubar was born in Blaine, Maine and educated in public schools as well as at Ricker Classical Institute. A United Baptist, he was the first ordained minister of that church in the state. He had six children. His children were also staunch temperance activists and involved in politics. His namesake, Benjamin Bubar Jr., was twice the Prohibition Party's nominee for President (1976 and 1980). One of his daughters, Rachel Bubar Kelly, was the Prohibition Party's nominee for vice-president in 1996. His youngest child, Paul Bubar, was one of the founders of Word of Life Fellowship.

== Writing ==
He was the author of the first anti-evolution bill submitted to the Maine Legislature. A fierce prohibitionist, in 1911 he published a book, The Devil Let Loose in Maine about the problems of alcohol in the State. A biographical sketch published by the Maine Legislature said that the book "did much to defeat" repeal of the Maine's prohibition of the sale of alcohol in 1911.

== Political career ==
=== Klan ===
During the 1920s, Bubar worked with the Ku Klux Klan in Maine and, in December 1925, went on a speaking tour of his native Aroostook County coordinated by Klan leader DeForest H. Perkins. In March 1929, Bubar introduced U.S. Senator J. Thomas Heflin at a Klan-sponsored meeting in Dexter, Maine. In 1936, he was described by the Bangor Daily News as "widely known in Maine as a Ku Klux Klan orator."

=== Electoral politics ===
He was elected to the Maine House of Representatives in 1934 as a Republican. In a February 1936 letter to the Lewiston Evening Journal' announcing his candidacy for the Republican nomination, Bubar wrote that "all other questions should be set aside until the question of unemployment, poverty, hunger, and the right of every citizen in Maine to live, and raise their families respectfully, is settled." He was a proponent of the Townsend Plan, a plan for old age pensions put forth during the Great Depression. Bubar described the Townsend Plan as "the only remedy in sight to stabilize business and permanently adjust the present social and industrial conditions." He ultimately ran for governor as an Independent, finishing in third place of three with 1.89% of the vote. He was elected again to the House in 1950 and 1952. In 1951, he was known for making a passionate but ultimately failed plea in favor of an income tax over a sales tax.
