= Sidney, Maine =

Town in Maine, United States

- Town
- Location in Kennebec County and the state of Maine
- Coordinates: 44°27′52″N 69°44′24″W
- Country: United States
- State: Maine
- County: Kennebec
- Incorporated: January 30, 1792
- Villages: Sidney; Bacons Corner; North Sidney; Sidney Center; West Sidney

Area
  - Total: 45.51 sq mi (117.87 km^{2})
  - Land: 42.25 sq mi (109.43 km^{2})
  - Water: 3.26 sq mi (8.44 km^{2})
- Elevation: 328 ft (100 m)

Population (2020)
  - Total: 4,645
  - Density: 110/sq mi (42.4/km^{2})
- Time zone: UTC-5 (Eastern (EST))
  - Summer (DST): UTC-4 (EDT)
- ZIP code: 04330
- Area code: 207
- FIPS code: 23-68385
- GNIS feature ID: 582725
- Website: www.sidneymaine.org

Sidney is a town in Kennebec County, Maine, United States. The population was 4,645 at the 2020 census. Sidney was incorporated as a town on January 30, 1792. The town was named for Sir Philip Sidney, an English author. Sidney is included in the Augusta, Maine micropolitan New England City and Town Area. Since 1937, the town has been the home of the New England Music Camp.

== Geography ==
According to the United States Census Bureau, the town has a total area of 45.51 square miles (117.87 km^{2}), of which 42.25 square miles (109.43 km^{2}) is land and 3.26 square miles (8.44 km^{2}) is water.

== Demographics ==
Historical population
Census	Pop.	Note	%±
1800	1,011		—
1810	1,558		54.1%
1820	1,890		21.3%
1830	2,191		15.9%
1840	2,190		0.0%
1850	1,955		−10.7%
1860	1,782		−8.8%
1870	1,471		−17.5%
1880	1,396		−5.1%
1890	1,334		−4.4%
1900	1,068		−19.9%
1910	927		−13.2%
1920	958		3.3%
1930	980		2.3%
1940	989		0.9%
1950	918		−7.2%
1960	988		7.6%
1970	1,319		33.5%
1980	2,052		55.6%
1990	2,593		26.4%
2000	3,514		35.5%
2010	4,208		19.7%
2020	4,645		10.4%
U.S. Decennial Census

=== 2010 census ===
As of the census of 2010, there were 4,208 people, 1,607 households, and 1,196 families residing in the town. The population density was 99.6 inhabitants per square mile (38.5/km^{2}). There were 1,850 housing units at an average density of 43.8 per square mile (16.9/km^{2}). The racial makeup of the town was 98.0% White, 0.1% African American, 0.3% Native American, 0.3% Asian, 0.1% from other races, and 1.0% from two or more races. Hispanic or Latino of any race were 0.7% of the population.

There were 1,607 households, of which 36.0% had children under the age of 18 living with them, 61.3% were married couples living together, 8.6% had a female householder with no husband present, 4.5% had a male householder with no wife present, and 25.6% were non-families. 17.6% of all households were made up of individuals, and 5.4% had someone living alone who was 65 years of age or older. The average household size was 2.61 and the average family size was 2.92.

The median age in the town was 41.4 years. 24% of residents were under the age of 18; 6.2% were between the ages of 18 and 24; 26% were from 25 to 44; 32.7% were from 45 to 64; and 11.2% were 65 years of age or older. The gender makeup of the town was 50.4% male and 49.6% female.

=== 2000 census ===
As of the census of 2000, there were 3,514 people, 1,314 households, and 989 families residing in the town. The population density was 83.2 inhabitants per square mile (32.1/km^{2}). There were 1,518 housing units at an average density of 35.9 per square mile (13.9/km^{2}). The racial makeup of the town was 98.78% White, 0.06% African American, 0.17% Native American, 0.28% Asian, 0.06% Pacific Islander, 0.11% from other races, and 0.54% from two or more races. Hispanic or Latino of any race were 0.43% of the population.

There were 1,314 households, out of which 38.7% had children under the age of 18 living with them, 64.8% were married couples living together, 7.2% had a female householder with no husband present, and 24.7% were non-families. 17.9% of all households were made up of individuals, and 5.0% had someone living alone who was 65 years of age or older. The average household size was 2.66 and the average family size was 3.02.

In the town, the population was spread out, with 27.0% under the age of 18, 6.5% from 18 to 24, 32.4% from 25 to 44, 25.1% from 45 to 64, and 8.9% who were 65 years of age or older. The median age was 36 years. For every 100 females, there were 98.9 males. For every 100 females age 18 and over, there were 98.5 males.

The median income for a household in the town was $42,500, and the median income for a family was $47,281. Males had a median income of $31,788 versus $22,861 for females. The per capita income for the town was $18,530. About 4.6% of families and 7.4% of the population were below the poverty line, including 6.6% of those under age 18 and 5.9% of those age 65 or over.

== Notable people ==
- Nehemiah Abbott (1804–1877), US congressman
- William M. Butterfield (1862–1932), architect
