= William Hutchinson Rowe =

American author and historian

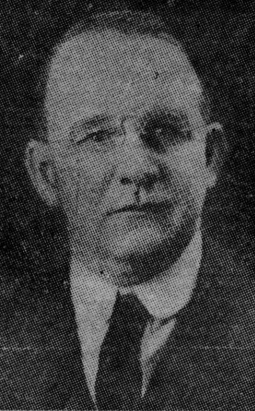
- Rowe around 1930
- Born: March 6, 1882; Yarmouth, Maine, U.S.
- Died: 1955 (aged c. 73); Yarmouth, Maine, U.S.
- Resting place: Riverside Cemetery, Yarmouth, Maine, U.S.
- Education: Colby College
- Occupations: Author, historian
- Years active: 1910–1955
- Known for: History of Yarmouth
- Notable work: Ancient North Yarmouth and Yarmouth, Maine 1636–1936: A History (1937)
- Board member of: Yarmouth School Committee
- Spouse: Anna M. (née Dubois) (1908–1955; his death)

William Hutchinson Rowe (March 6, 1882 – 1955) was an American author and historian who lived in Yarmouth, Maine. The town's elementary school, built the year he died, is now named for him. In 1937, he published Ancient North Yarmouth and Yarmouth, Maine 1636–1936: A History, covering three centuries of the town's past. As of the early 21st century, it was still in print.

== Early life ==
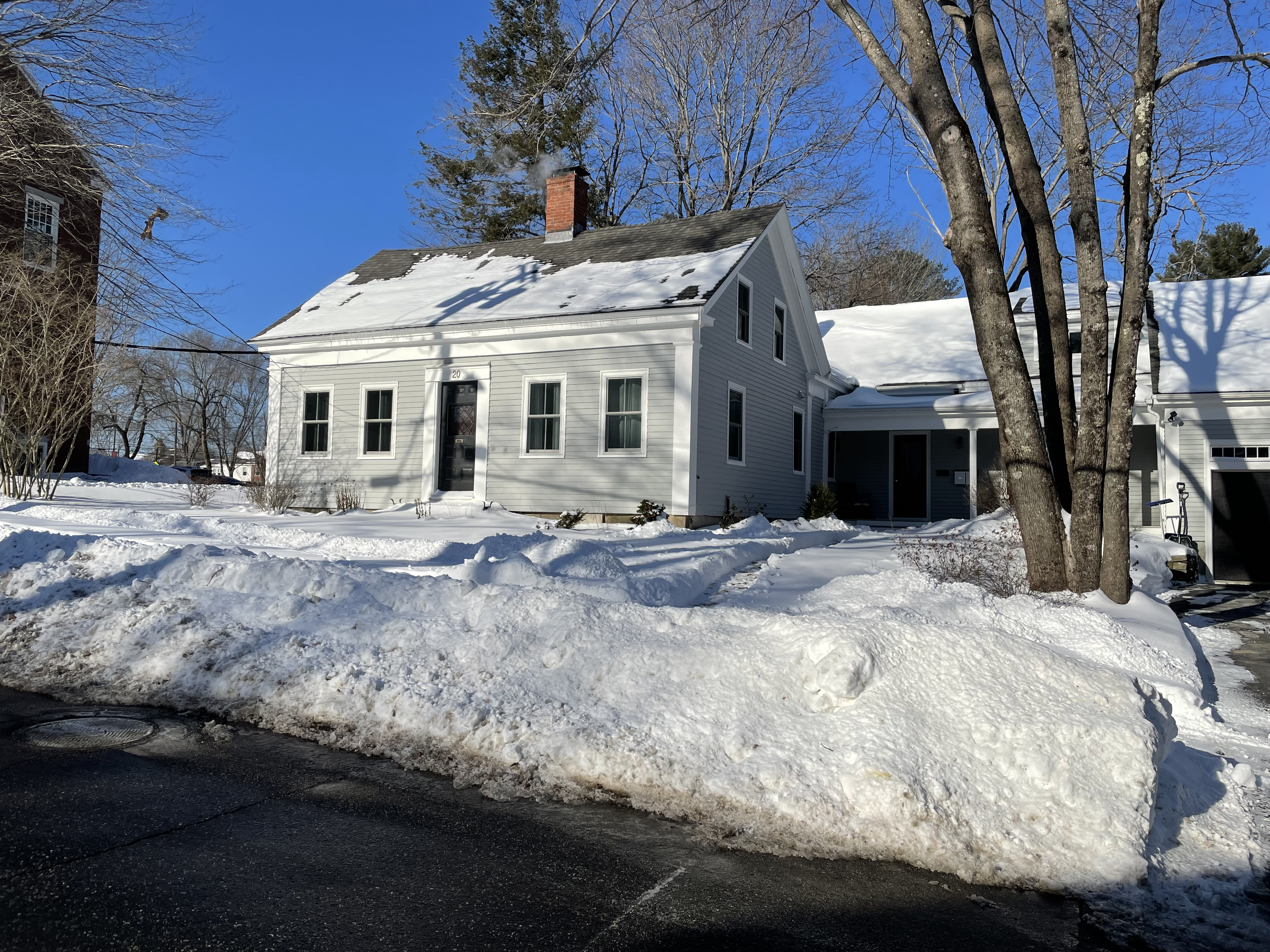
Today's 20 Bridge Street, where Rowe lived until his death

Rowe was born on March 6, 1882, on his family's farm in Yarmouth, Maine, the first of two sons of Mary Jane (1859–1944), from Brunswick, and New Gloucester native Charles O. Rowe (1851–1928), a farmer. A brother, Sylvanus Charles, followed on November 1, 1885; he died in 1910, aged about 25, while employed at the Hollingsworth & Whitney Company, of Winslow, Maine.

Rowe grew up in a house, formerly owned by his grandparents, at today's 1841-built 20 Bridge Street, near its corner with Main Street.

In 1902, he enrolled at Colby College in Waterville, Maine, where he studied with a view to becoming a clergyman. He was a member of the Phi Delta Theta fraternity.

== Career ==
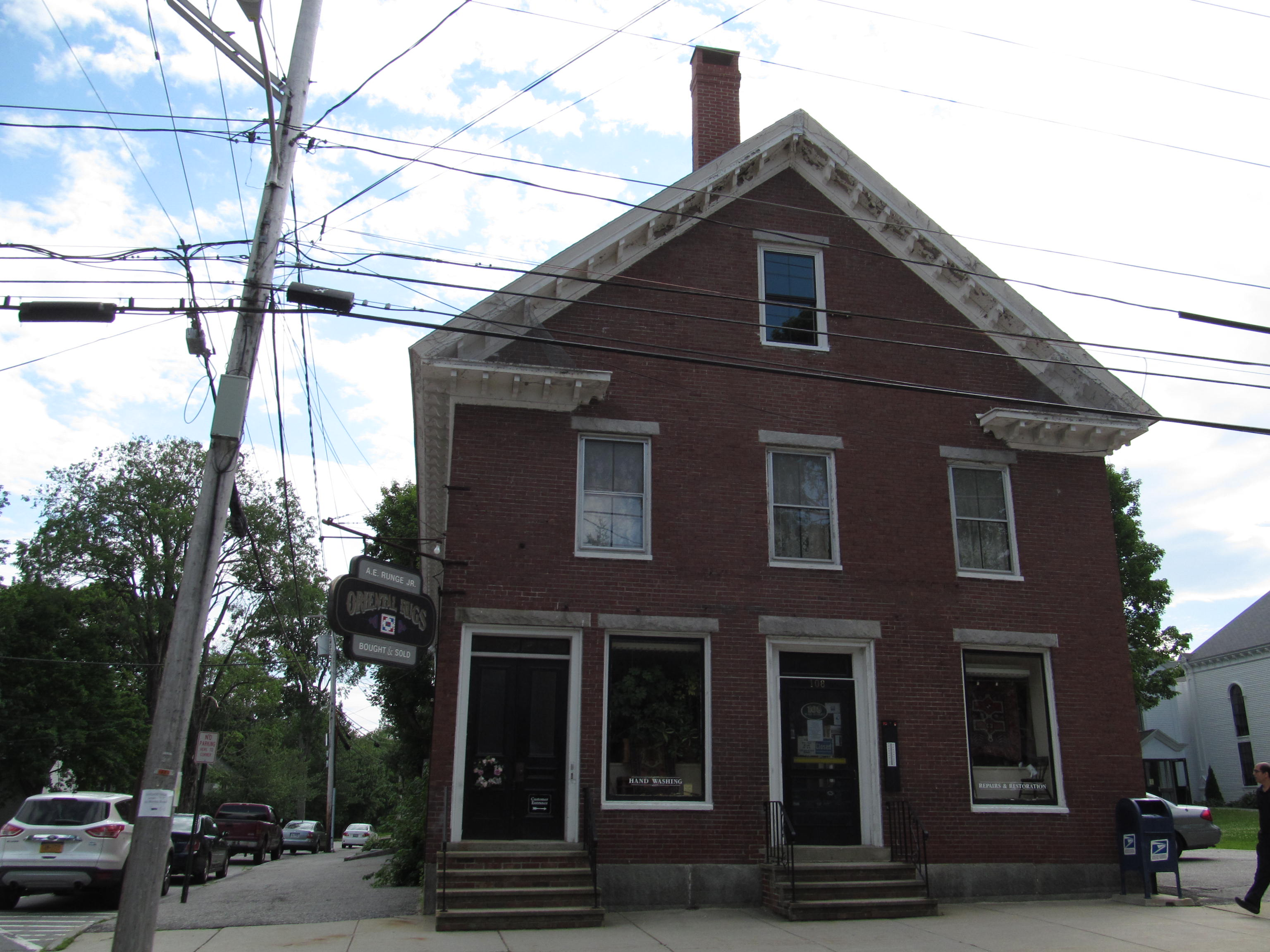
108 Main Street, in which Rowe operated a pharmacy for many years

After graduating from Colby, a throat ailment caused Rowe to return to the drug business, in which he gained some experience prior to college. Shortly after Rowe received his high-school diploma in 1899, Leone R. Cook, owner of a drug store in Yarmouth's Upper Village, offered him an apprenticeship. He remained there for two-and-a-half years, claiming his experience there was "among the best of his life".

From January 1904, Rowe ran a pharmacy in the brick building at today's 108 Main Street, at the corner of Portland Street. He had been deputizing for its previous owner, Burt L. Alden, during an illness, since October. He became a registered druggist in October 1904. He added the stock of William Richards' dry goods business after it closed at 82–84 Main Street.

In September 1904, Rowe fought with a robber in his store who drew a revolver on him. Rowe, who had $250 on the premises, knocked the gun aside and tussled with the assailant. After hearing voices, the robber ran away.

Rowe began serving on the Yarmouth School Committee in 1905, becoming its chairman from 1907, and continued in the role for the next 34 years. He was also a member of the Maine Historical Society.

=== Writing ===
"Rowe's propensity for writing manifested itself when he was too young to seek an outlet for his literary product through any medium other than the children's column in the household paper," wrote The Druggists Circular in March 1910, in an addendum to his column "Profit from the Advertising Section". He wrote an article, titled "Problems and Opportunities of the Country Druggist", for the March 1909 edition of the circular. Further columns from Rowe included "Wooing the Summer Resort Trade" (June 1909) and "The Country Druggist: His Advertising" (December 1909).

Rowe also contributed paragraphs to magazines and religious publications.

The first recognized book Rowe wrote was the novel-style Shipbuilding Days and Tales of the Sea in 1924. He followed this up in 1929 with Shipbuilding Days in Casco Bay, 1727–1890.

In 1923, Rowe announced that a history of Yarmouth was in the works. He posted an advertisement in the program for Yarmouth High School's production of Forest Acres, asking if people would put forth any historical records in their possession. The project, titled Ancient North Yarmouth and Yarmouth, Maine 1636–1936: A History, took fourteen more years to complete, covered 300 years of the town's history, and was "so thorough that it is still in print". The book contained 427 pages, fifteen chapters (plus a detailed appendix), was printed on antique book paper and bound in gold-stamped cloth. It was printed by Portland's Southworth–Anthoensen Press, based at 105 Middle Street. It was on sale for $5 at the time of its initial release.

Although Yarmouth's heyday as a shipbuilding town had largely ended by the time he was born, Rowe had an affinity for the sea, for he was also the author of books on the town's maritime history.

==== Selected bibliography ====
- Yarmouth Personages, an Introduction. An Attempt to Revive the Memory of Individuals Whose Names Were Once Household Words in Old North Yarmouth and Yarmouth (1910)
- Shipbuilding Days and Tales of the Sea, in Old North Yarmouth and Yarmouth, Maine (1924)
- Shipbuilding Days in Casco Bay, 1727–1890: Being Footnotes to the Maritime History of Maine (1929)
- Ancient North Yarmouth and Yarmouth, Maine, 1636–1936: A History (1937)
- The Maritime History of Maine: Three Centuries of Shipbuilding and Seafaring (1948)
- The Yarmouth Poets (1955)

== Personal life ==
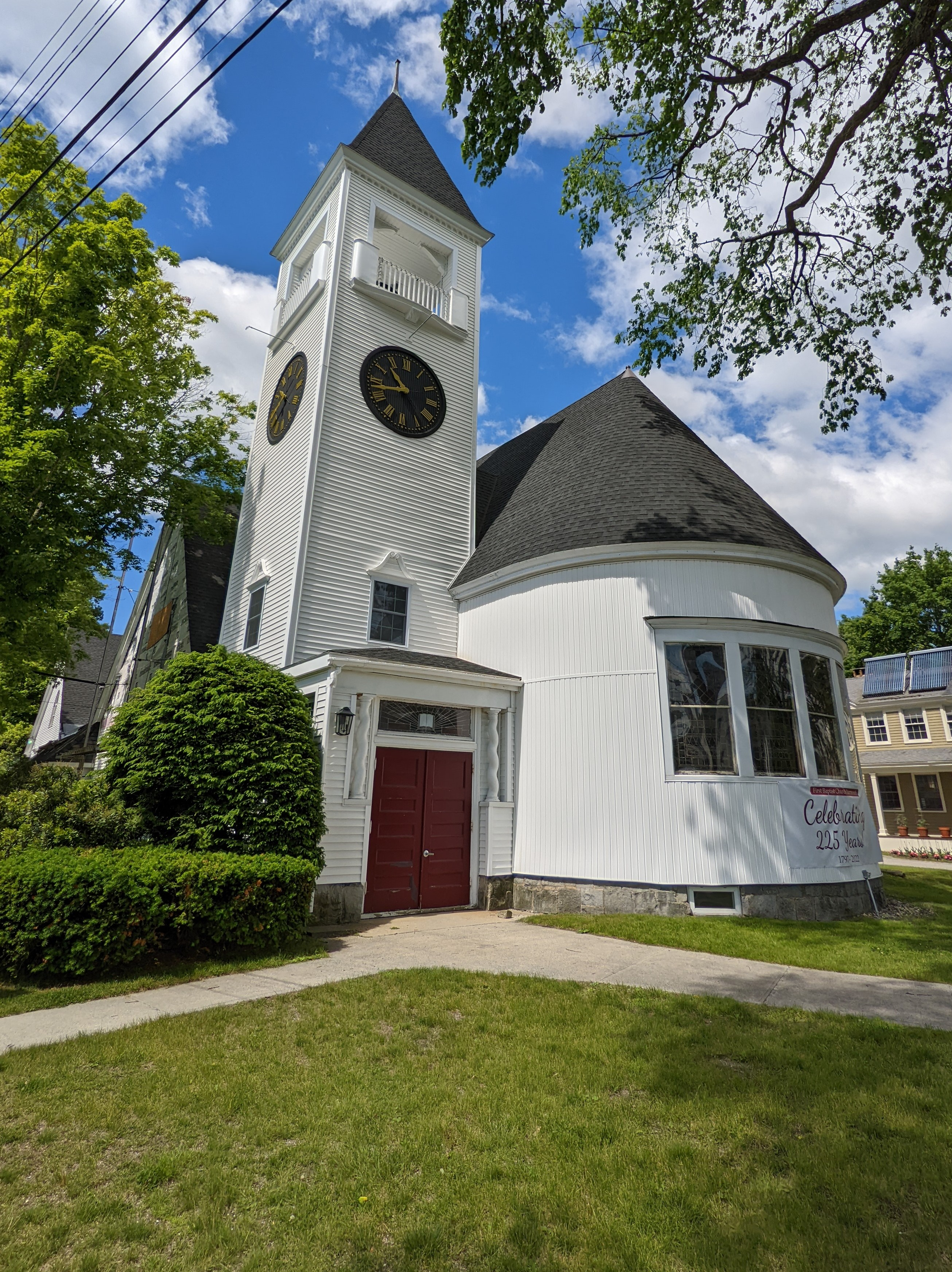
Yarmouth's First Baptist Church, where Rowe was a deacon

On April 15, 1908, Rowe married Anna M. Dubois (1882–1964), of Nashua, New Hampshire, whom he described as "the one woman".

He was a member of Yarmouth's First Baptist Church, which moved to a new (the current) building at today's 346 Main Street in 1889. Up until the age of seven, he attended the North Yarmouth and Freeport Baptist Meetinghouse on Hillside Street. He was a deacon at the Main Street church, and was also a member of the Free and Accepted Masons (both Blue Lodge and Chapter). He was 32nd-degree and a Past Master and Past High Priest. In addition, he was a member of the Order of the Eastern Star.

In 1940, Rowe was awarded an honorary degree by the University of Maine.

== Death ==
Rowe died in 1955, aged about 73. He is interred in Yarmouth's Riverside Cemetery. His wife of 47 years survived him by nine years, and is buried alongside him.
