= University of Maine at Farmington =

Public college in Farmington, Maine, U.S.

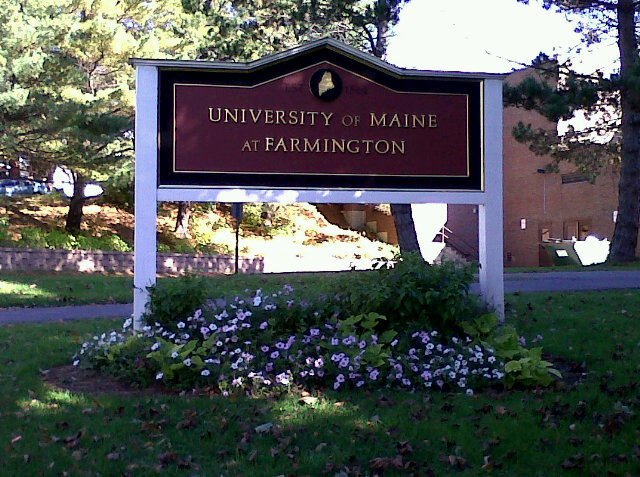
- UMF sign on campus
- Former names: Western State Normal School (1864–1878); Northern State Normal School (1878–1889); Farmington State Normal School (1889–1945); Farmington State Teachers College (1945–1965); Farmington State College (1965–1968); Farmington State College of the University of Maine (1968–1971)
- Type: Public university
- Established: August 24, 1864; 162 years ago
- Parent institution: University of Maine System
- Chancellor: Dannel Malloy
- President: Joseph McDonnell
- Students: 1,614 (fall 2024)
- Undergraduates: 1,191 (fall 2024)
- Postgraduates: 423 (fall 2024)
- Location: Farmington, Maine, U.S. 44°40′0″N 70°8′50″W
- Campus: Rural
- Newspaper: The Farmington Flyer
- Colors: Maroon, gold, and gray
- Nickname: Beavers
- Sporting affiliations: NCAA Division III – NAC
- Mascot: Beaver
- Website: farmington.edu

The University of Maine at Farmington (UMaine Farmington or UMF) is a public liberal arts college in Farmington, Maine. It is part of the University of Maine System and a founding member of the Council of Public Liberal Arts Colleges.

== History ==
In March 1863, a Normal School Act passed into law, and that fall, Farmington was chosen from a list of possible locations for a normal school. Founded in 1864 as the state's first publicly funded normal school, the first class graduated from the Western State Normal School in 1866. Over the following hundred years, the school's name would change several times: Northern State Normal School (1878), Farmington State Normal School (1889), Farmington State Teachers College (1945), and Farmington State College (1965).

Farmington State College merged into the University of Maine System in 1968, initially known as the Farmington State College of the University of Maine, before taking on its current name in 1971. On June 15, 1965, the Mantor Library, an academic library, was dedicated.

Many early graduates attended the school for its liberal arts offerings alone. Among these were the Stanley brothers, famous for building the Stanley Steamer automobile, and John Frank Stevens, engineer of the Panama Canal. Comedian Bob Marley also graduated with a degree in community health.

In 2016, the University of Maine at Farmington Education Center was named in honor of its longtime president Theodora J. Kalikow, who served from 1994 to 2012. Now called the Theodora J. Kalikow Education Center, the LEED-Silver certified building is home to the UMF College of Education, Health and Rehabilitation.

== Recognitions ==
UMF was named as one of the Most Transfer-Friendly College on Phi Theta Kappa’s 2024 Transfer Honor Roll.

In 2025, UMF was ranked a Top Performer in Social Mobility according to US News & World Report. It highlights the University's commitment to transforming lives through accessible, affordable education. It was also named Top 20 Colleges for Skiing & Winter Sports.

The University of Maine at Farmington was ranked in the Top 10 Best Value schools in 2025 in the Regional Colleges - North category.

== Athletics ==
The UMaine Farmington Beavers compete in the NCAA Division III North Atlantic Conference. The school's official colors are maroon, gold, and gray.

UMaine Farmington has 12 NCAA varsity teams, including men's teams in baseball, basketball, cross country, golf, and soccer; and women's teams in basketball, cross country, field hockey, soccer, softball, and lacrosse. The university also fields skiing and snowboarding programs that compete through the United States Collegiate Ski & Snowboard Association (USCSA).

In addition to outdoor athletic fields and Dearborn Gymnasium, UMF has a Fitness and Recreation Center that houses a cardio fitness area, a weight room, courts, a walking track, and a 25-yard swimming pool open to students and the community.

== Notable people ==
=== Alumni ===
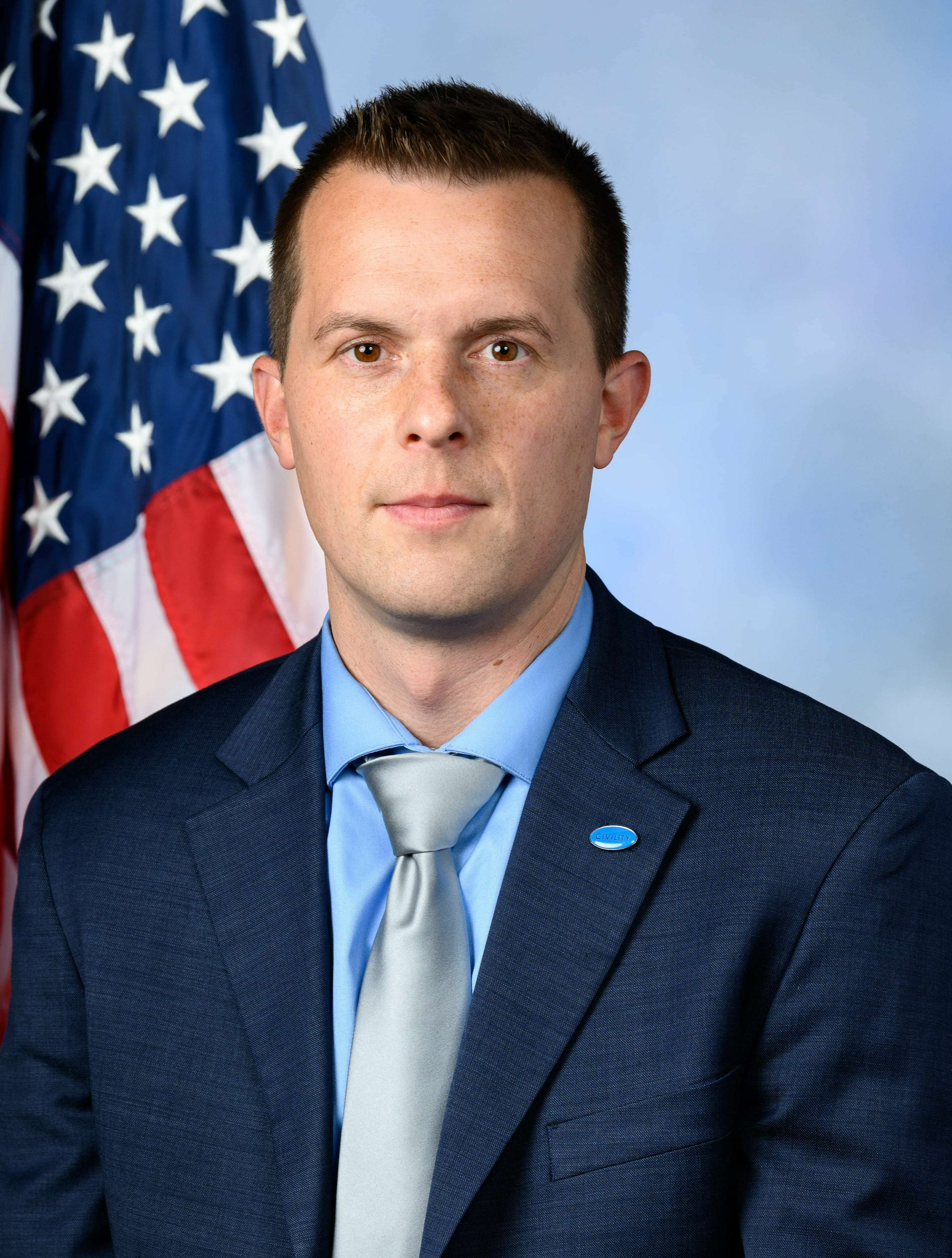
Jared Golden

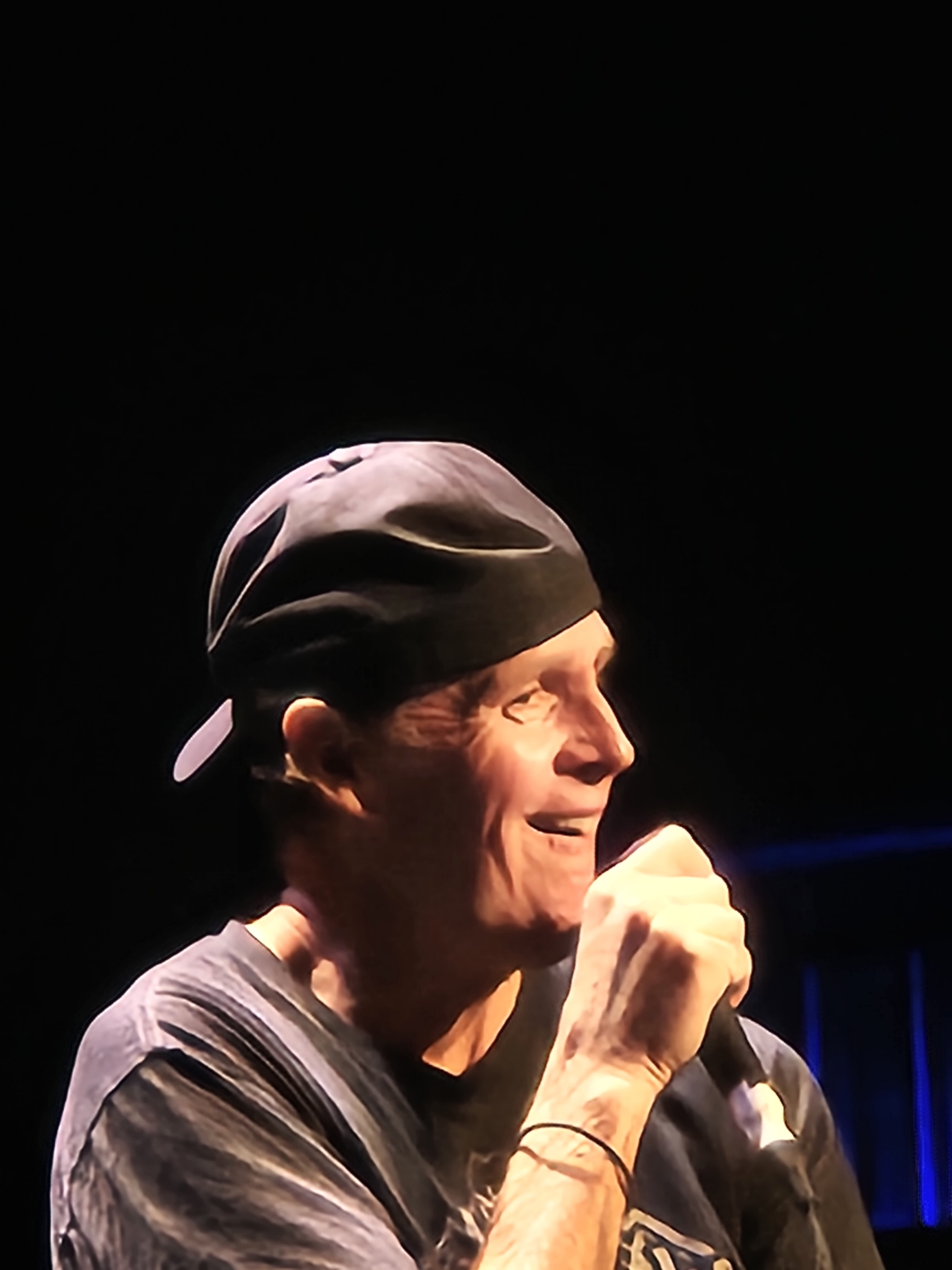
Bob Marley

- Sharon H. Abrams, executive director, Maine Children's Home
- Steve Clifford, NBA basketball coach
- Jared Golden, Marine Corps veteran and United States Representative for Maine's 2nd Congressional District
- Lance Harvell, state legislator
- Otis Wells Johnson, Wisconsin state legislator
- H. Scott Landry, Maine state legislator
- Sam Leal, college basketball coach
- Bob Marley, comedian
- David Miramant, Maine state legislator
- Austin Phillips, ventriloquist and puppet maker
- Francis Edgar Stanley, co-founder of the Stanley Motor Carriage Company
- Freelan Oscar Stanley, co-founder of the Stanley Motor Carriage Company and builder of the Stanley Hotel
- John Frank Stevens, chief engineer of the Panama Canal
- Charlotte Warren, Maine state legislator and former mayor of Hallowell, Maine
- Alexander Willette, Maine state legislator
- Chandler Woodcock, Maine state legislator

=== Faculty ===
- Jonathan R. Cohen, Professor Emeritus of Philosophy
- David Daniel, psychologist
- Allison Hepler, historian, member of the Maine House of Representatives.
