= 2019 MotoAmerica Twins Championship =

The 2019 MotoAmerica Twins Cup season was the 2nd season of the Twins Cup class in MotoAmerica. Chris Parrish entered the season as the defending champion, after taking the inaugural championship aboard a Suzuki SV650.

== Calendar and results ==
Round	Circuit	Date	Race 1 Winner	Race 2 Winner
1	(Georgia (U.S. state)) Road Atlanta	April 5–7	(United States) Michael Barnes	(United States) Michael Barnes
	(Texas) Circuit of the Americas	April 12–14	(No Event)	(No Event)
2	Virginia International Raceway	May 3–5	(United States) Chris Parrish	(No Event)
3	(Wisconsin) Road America	May 31-June 2	(United States) Draik Beauchamp	(No Event)
4	Utah Motorsports Campus	June 14–16	(Canada) Alex Dumas	(No Event)
5	(California) Laguna Seca	July 12–14	(United States) Kaleb De Keyrel	(No Event)
6	(California) Sonoma Raceway	August 9–11	(Canada) Alex Dumas	(No Event)
7	(Pennsylvania) Pittsburgh International Race Complex	August 23–25	(Canada) Alex Dumas	(Canada) Alex Dumas
8	New Jersey Motorsports Park	September 6–8	(Canada) Alex Dumas	(No Event)
9	(Alabama) Barber Motorsports Park	September 20–22	(United States) Chris Parrish	(No Event)

== Teams and riders ==
2020 Entry List
Team	Constructor	No.	Rider	Rounds
1833Cjknows/Roaring Toyz	Yamaha	251	(United States) Kaleb De Keyrel	5
2dags Racing	Suzuki	377	(United States) Dustin Walbon	1–3, 5, 7
419 Racing	Suzuki	592	(United States) Jon Crawford	1, 2, 7, 9
419 Racing	Suzuki	728	(United States) Jerry Reeves	1, 2, 7, 9
789 Racing	Suzuki	789	(United States) Steven Smith	1, 9
AGV Sport Monkey Moto	Ducati	921	(United Kingdom) Steven Shakespeare	3–8
Altus Motorsports	Yamaha	117	(United States) Austin Phillips	1
AP MotoArts	Yamaha	77	(United States) Draik Beauchamp	All
AP MotoArts	Yamaha	107	(United States) Shawn Hill	1, 3, 7
AP MotoArts	Yamaha	120	(United States) Cooper McDonald	1, 3–9
Arizona Speed Engineering	Kawasaki	183	(United States) Pete Murray	9
Autovest Suzuki	Suzuki	24	(United States) Joseph Blasius	All
Blue Line Racing	Suzuki	167	(United States) Anthony Marcinek	3, 7
Catalyst Reaction Suspension/FeelLikeAPro.com	Suzuki	215	(United States) Michael Kim	4, 5, 6
Center for Plastic Surgery Racing	Yamaha	532	(United States) Carl Price	All
Century Trucks & Vans	Suzuki	176	(United States) Shawn Adams	3–9
Century Trucks & Vans	Suzuki	177	(United States) Daniel Adams	All
Champ Racing	Suzuki	198	(United States) Jonathan Champ	3, 7
Champ Racing	Suzuki	416	(United States) Daniel Mataczynski	7
Chiefs Racing Team	Suzuki	996	(United States) Greg Reisinger	1, 2, 7, 9
Colin Chatterjie Racing	Suzuki	460	(United States) Colin Chatterjie	8
Conquest CBD/RiderzLaw Racing	Yamaha	213	(United States) Jason Madama	All
Copoulos Built RBoM Engineering	Suzuki	180	(United States) Curtis Murray	All
Crosslin Racing	Suzuki	409	(United States) Christian Crosslin	9
Crosslin Racing	Suzuki	428	(United States) Calvin Crosslin	7
D&D Cycles	Yamaha	117	(United States) Austin Phillips	1
Dairy Boys Racing	Suzuki	110	(United States) Tim Koebert	3
Danielle Diaz Racing	Kawasaki	86	(United States) Danielle Diaz	4, 5
Dustin Walbon Racing	Suzuki	377	(United States) Dustin Walbon	1–3, 5, 7
First XV Racing	Suzuki	771	(United States) Clifton Ramsdell	1–6
Ghetto Customs	Suzuki	1	(United States) Chris Parrish	All
Gino Angella Racing	Yamaha	231	(United States) Gino Angella	1–3, 5, 8, 9
Honos	Yamaha	71	(Mexico) Jorge Ehrenstein	5
Janglerracing	Suzuki	460	(United States) Colin Chatterjie	8
JB Racing/RBoM Engineering	Yamaha	121	(United States) Joseph Behlmann	9
KK47 Racing	Yamaha	473	(United States) Kris Lillegard	All
LWT Racer	Suzuki	429	(United States) Tyler Humphreys	8
LWT Racer	Suzuki	444	(United States) Doane Richardson	2
LWT Racer	Suzuki	600	(United States) Sam Wiest	2, 7, 8
LWT Racer	Suzuki	889	(United States) Sean Dougherty	2, 8
LWT RACING/BMG Motorsports	Suzuki	272	(Republic of Ireland) Brian McGlade	8
Metal Mulisha	Yamaha	175	(United States) Tyler Valentine	4
Metric Garage	Yamaha	127	(United States) Jim Whitten	All
MonkeyMoto/AGV Sport	Ducati	921	(United Kingdom) Steven Shakespeare	3–8
N2 Racing	Suzuki	642	(United States) Robert Cichielo Jr.	1–3, 7–9
N2/Escape Racing	Suzuki	298	(United States) Ned Brown	All
PlasticSurgeryRacing.com	Yamaha	532	(United States) Carl Price	All
Quarterley Racing	Ducati	111	(United States) Michael Barnes	All
R6 Graveyard	Suzuki	661	(United States) Randall Smith	1
RB Racing	Suzuki	171	(United States) Ray Hofman	1–3, 5, 7
RBoM Racing	Suzuki	119	(United States) Tyler Freeman	1, 2, 9
RBoM Racing	Suzuki	180	(United States) Curtis Murray	All
RBoM Racing	Suzuki	442	(United States) Gillis Glidewell	1, 2, 9
RBoM Racing	Suzuki	615	(United States) Austin Miller	1, 2, 7, 9
RBoM Racing	Suzuki	621	(United States) Chris Bays	1–5, 8
RBoM Racing	Suzuki	18	(United States) Jackson Blackmon	8, 9
Ready To Ride	Suzuki	270	(United States) Ryne Snooks	2, 7, 8
RiderzLaw Racing	Suzuki	38	(United States) Kris Turner	1–7, 9
RiderzLaw Racing	Suzuki	303	(United States) Andrew Yzabal	4–6
RiderzLaw Racing	Suzuki	454	(United States) David Catalina	5, 6
Roadracing World Young Guns	Suzuki	16	(Canada) Alex Dumas	All
Roaring Toyz/1-833-CJKNOWS	Yamaha	711	(United States) Robert Fisher	1, 2, 3, 5
Roaring Toyz/1-833-CJKNOWS	Yamaha	251	(United States) Kaleb De Keyrel	5
Ruthless Racing	Yamaha	229	(Canada) Darren James	1–5, 7–9
SP8S Racing	Kawasaki	138	(United States) Chris Speights	2, 7, 8
Spears Racing	Suzuki	911	(United States) Jeffrey Tigert	1, 3, 4
SRH Plumbing	Yamaha	107	(United States) Shawn Hill	1, 3, 7
SWANG Motorsports	Yamaha	671	(United States) Samuel Wang	2
Tanglewood Transport Racing	Suzuki	941	(United States) Scott Nelson	7
Team Legacy Racing	Yamaha	100	(United States) Justin Filice	1, 2
Team Thomas Racing	Suzuki	160	(Canada) Joshua Thomas	1, 7
Team Yo!	Suzuki	141	(United States) Keith Buras	2, 7, 9
The Draik 77	Yamaha	77	(United States) Draik Beauchamp	All
Trackworx Motorsports	Suzuki	132	(United States) Jonathan Pellnitz	1–3, 7
Trees Racing	Suzuki	154	(United States) Jared Trees	7
Turner's Cycle/MotoUniverse Racing	Suzuki	38	(United States) Kris Turner	1–7, 9
TWF Racing	Yamaha	551	(United States) Aaron Tulchinsky	6
Unit F14 Powder Coating	Suzuki	545	(United States) Chandler Slagle	9
Yall Mad Racing/AP MotoArts	Yamaha	504	(United States) Matthew Riedlinger	6
Richard Lee Memorial Racing Team	Suzuki	130	(United States) Dave Juntunen	3

== Championship standings ==
=== Riders' championship ===
Scoring system

Points are awarded to the top fifteen finishers. A rider has to finish the race to earn points.

Position	1st	2nd	3rd	4th	5th	6th	7th	8th	9th	10th	11th	12th	13th	14th	15th
Points	25	20	16	13	11	10	9	8	7	6	5	4	3	2	1

Pos	Rider	Bike	RAT (Georgia (U.S. state))		VIR (Virginia)	RAM (Wisconsin)	UMC (Utah)	MON (California)	SON (California)	PIT (Pennsylvania)		NJE (New Jersey)	BAR (Alabama)	Pts
Pos	Rider	Bike	R1	R2	R1	R1	R1	R1	R1	R1	R2	R1	R1	Pts
1	(Canada) Alex Dumas	Suzuki	5	6	DNS	2	1	3	1	1	1	1	3	198
2	(United States) Draik Beauchamp	Yamaha	6	4	3	1	5	4	2	2	2	4	5	172
3	(United States) Michael Barnes	Ducati	1	1	Ret	3	2	2	Ret	3	3	5	2	169
4	(United States) Chris Parrish	Suzuki	3	2	1	8	Ret	7	Ret	5	4	6	1	137
5	(United States) Curtis Murray	Suzuki	2	3	2	9	7	9	6	Ret	8	3	6	123
6	(United States) Jason Madama	Yamaha	7	5	23	6	9	6	5	7	7	7	10	91
7	(United States) Joseph Blasius	Suzuki	10	7	5	11	4	10	3	4	DNS	Ret	9	86
8	(United States) Cooper McDonald	Yamaha	21	18		10	3	8	8	8	9	9	8	68
9	(United States) Kris Turner	Suzuki		Ret	11	4	Ret	5	4	Ret	5		4	66
10	(United States) Kris Lillegard	Yamaha	15	10	10	17	10	16	10	10	10	10	12	47
11	(United States) Jeffrey Tigert	Suzuki	4	8		7	6							40
12	(Canada) Darren James	Yamaha		Ret	Ret	5	Ret	Ret		6	6	8	Ret	39
13	(United States) Daniel Adams	Suzuki		DNS	9	13	8	14	7	Ret	11	Ret	11	39
14	(United States) Chris Bays	Suzuki	9	9	7	14	11	13				13		36
15	(United States) Ned Brown	Suzuki	13	13	6	15	14	17	12	13	16	11	14	33
16	(United States) Jackson Blackmon	Suzuki										2	7	29
17	(United States) Robert Fisher	Yamaha	12	12	4	12		12						29
18	(United States) Kaleb De Keyrel	Yamaha						1						25
19	(United States) Jerry Reeves	Suzuki	19	16	8					9	12		15	20
20	(United States) Ray Hofman	Suzuki	11	11	Ret	18		18		14	17			12
21	(United States) Justin Filice	Yamaha	8		Ret									8
22	(United States) Sam Wiest	Suzuki			DNS						13	12		7
23	(United States) Aaron Tulchinsky	Yamaha							9					7
24	(United States) Jared Trees	Suzuki								11	14			7
25	(United Kingdom) Steven Shakespeare	Ducati				27	Ret	20	11	16	21	17		5
26	(United States) Eziah Davis	Suzuki						11						5
27	(United States) Ryne Snooks	Suzuki			12						22	15		5
28	(United States) Jonathan Champ	Suzuki				16				12	15			5
29	(United States) Tyler Valentine	Yamaha					12							4
30	(United States) Danielle Diaz	Kawasaki					13	15						4
31	(United States) Christian Crosslin	Suzuki											13	3
32	(United States) Michael Kim	Suzuki					20	21	13					3
33	(United States) Greg Reisinger	Suzuki	23	23	13					21	29		30	3
34	(United States) Dustin Walbon	Suzuki	16	14	Ret	20		Ret			DNS			2
35	(Canada) Joshua Thomas	Suzuki	14	Ret							DNS			2
36	(United States) Clifton Ramsdell	Suzuki	25	Ret	20	26	17	22	14					2
37	(United States) Robert Cichielo Jr.	Suzuki	26	20	Ret	24				26	26	14	16	2
38	(United States) Gillis Glidewell	Suzuki	17	15	15								19	2
39	(United States) Austin Miller	Suzuki	28	24	14					17	18		20	2
40	(United States) Shawn Adams	Suzuki				19	15	28	Ret	22	33	16	21	1
41	(United States) Jon Crawford	Suzuki	22	22	Ret					15	19		22	1
42	(United States) Carl Price	Yamaha	24	21	22	22	18	23	15	23	25	20	26	1
43	(United States) Calvin Crosslin	Suzuki								28	30			0
44	(United States) Matthew Riedlinger	Yamaha							Ret					0
45	(United States) Colin Chatterjie	Suzuki										Ret		0
46	(Republic of Ireland) Brian McGlade	Suzuki										Ret		0
47	(United States) Tyler Humphreys	Suzuki										Ret		0
48	(United States) Tim Koebert	Suzuki				DNS								0
49	(United States) Samuel Wang	Yamaha			DNS									0
50	(United States) Austin Phillips	Yamaha	31											0
51	(United States) Tyler Freeman	Suzuki	20	17	26								17	0
52	(United States) David Catalina	Yamaha						19	17					0
53	(United States) Randall Smith	Suzuki	Ret											0
54	(United States) Andrew Yzabal	Yamaha					19	25	18					0
55	(United States) Chris Speights	Kawasaki			16					24	27	19		0
56	(United States) Doane Richardson	Suzuki			19									0
57	(United States) Sean Dougherty	Suzuki			18							21		0
58	(United States) Joseph Behlmann	Yamaha											23	0
59	(United States) Anthony Marcinek	Yamaha				21				18	23			0
60	(United States) Keith Buras	Suzuki			17					25	20		24	0
61	(United States) Shawn Hill	Yamaha	18	Ret		Ret				20	24			0
62	(United States) Jim Whitten	Yamaha	30	26	24	23	16	24	16	19	Ret	18	25	0
63	(United States) Pete Murray	Kawasaki											27	0
64	(Mexico) Jorge Ehrenstein	Yamaha						27						0
65	(United States) Chandler Slagle	Suzuki											28	0
66	(United States) Jonathan Pellnitz	Suzuki	29	25	25	25				29	28			0
67	(United States) Dave Juntunen	Suzuki				28								0
68	(United States) Gino Angella	Yamaha	Ret	27	21	Ret		26				22	29	0
69	(United States) Steven Smith	Suzuki	27	19										0
70	(United States) Daniel Mataczynski	Suzuki								27	31			0
71	(United States) Scott Nelson	Suzuki								30	32			0
Pos	Rider	Bike	RAT (Georgia (U.S. state))		VIR (Virginia)	RAM (Wisconsin)	UMC (Utah)	MON (California)	SON (California)	PIT (Pennsylvania)		NJE (New Jersey)	BAR (Alabama)	Pts
