= Jonas R. Shurtleff House =

Historic house in Maine, United States

- Formerly listed on the U.S. National Register of Historic Places
- Location within Maine Location within the United States
- Location: Augusta Rd. (US 201), Winslow, Maine
- Coordinates: 44°31′36″N 69°38′34″W
- Area: 1 acre (0.40 ha)
- Built: 1850
- Architectural style: Gothic Revival
- NRHP reference No.: 74000173

Significant dates
- Added to NRHP: December 30, 1974
- Removed from NRHP: March 21, 2023

The Jonas R. Shurtleff House was a historic house on United States Route 201 in Winslow, Maine. Built around 1850, it was a distinctive local example of vernacular Gothic Revival architecture. It was listed on the National Register of Historic Places in 1974. It was demolished in 2018, and was delisted from the National Register in 2023.

== Description and history ==
The Jonas R. Shurtleff House stood in southern Winslow, on the west side of US 201, a short distance south of its junction with Maine State Route 137. It was a two-story wood-frame structure, with a gabled roof, vertical board siding, and a granite foundation. The main roof gable and side gables were adorned with bargeboard trim. The ground-floor windows were topped by extended cornices supported by narrow paired brackets, while second-floor windows were topped by square-headed molding. The main entrance was sheltered by a porch with latticework trim forming Gothic arches. Above the entrance was a three-part Palladian-style window, and there was a triangular multi-light window in the gable point above. The house's interior was decorated with modest Greek Revival trim.

The house was built sometime between 1850 and 1853 by Jonas Shurtleff, who had purchased the land in 1849. Its designer is not known; its more fanciful features, although borrowing in some ways from published materials on residential Gothic architecture, were largely vernacular. The house had been a local landmark and minor tourist attraction since its construction.

== See also ==
- National Register of Historic Places listings in Kennebec County, Maine
