= Dick McGee =

American football coach and athletic director (1930–2015)

Biographical details
- Born: August 27, 1930; Providence, Rhode Island, U.S.
- Died: February 26, 2015 (aged 84); Fairfield, Maine, U.S.

Coaching career (HC unless noted)
- 1954–1955: Winslow HS (ME)
- 1956–1964: Lawrence HS (ME)
- 1965–1966: Bowdoin (assistant)
- 1967–1978: Colby

Administrative career (AD unless noted)
- 1974–1987: Colby

Head coaching record
- Overall: 29–66–1 (college)

Richard John McGee (August 27, 1930 – February 26, 2015) was an American football coach and athletic director who was the head football coach at Colby College from 1967 to 1978. He was the school's athletic director from 1974 to 1987 and remained a member of the faculty until 1998.

== Early life ==
McGee was born on August 27, 1930, in Providence, Rhode Island, to Joseph and Claire McGee. Joe McGee was the head coach of the Providence Steam Roller, a professional football team in the American Association. McGee played football at the La Salle Academy and the University of Maine. He was a member of the 1951 Maine Black Bears football team, which posted the first undefeated season in school history.

== Career ==
McGee began his coaching career at Winslow High School. He then spent nine seasons as the head football coach at Lawrence High School in Fairfield, Maine. He also co-founded Fairfield's Police Athletic League and served as its director from 1959 until 2013. In 1964, he was named coach of the year by the Maine High School Coaches Association. From 1965 to 1967, he was an assistant football and head lacrosse coach at Bowdoin College.

In 1967, McGee was named head football coach at Colby College. In twelve seasons under McGee, Colby went 29–66–1. His 1972 team went 7–1, which was the most wins in a season in Colby football history. Their 222 points was the most a Colby team had scored in season since the 1914 Mules team that came close to beating Navy.

McGee became Colby's acting athletic director in July 1974 after John Winkin resigned to become the head baseball coach at Maine. He was named AD and chairman of the physical education department the following May. He continued to serve as football coach until 1979, when his increased administrative work caused him to give up coaching. He stepped down as AD in 1987, but remained with the school as a professor of physical education until 1998.

== Personal life ==
McGee married Shirley Harriet Marcia of Fairfield, Maine in 1956. They had four children. McGee died on February 26, 2015. In 2019, Colby named its head football coaching position the Dick McGee Head Coach for Colby Football.
