= International Plaza =

International Plaza may refer to:

- International Plaza (Pennsylvania). formerly known as Scott Plaza, an office complex in Tinicum Township, Delaware County, Pennsylvania
- International Plaza (Singapore), a commercial and residential building in Singapore
- International Plaza and Bay Street, a shopping mall in Tampa, Florida
