= Two Cent Bridge =

Suspension bridge in Maine, U.S.

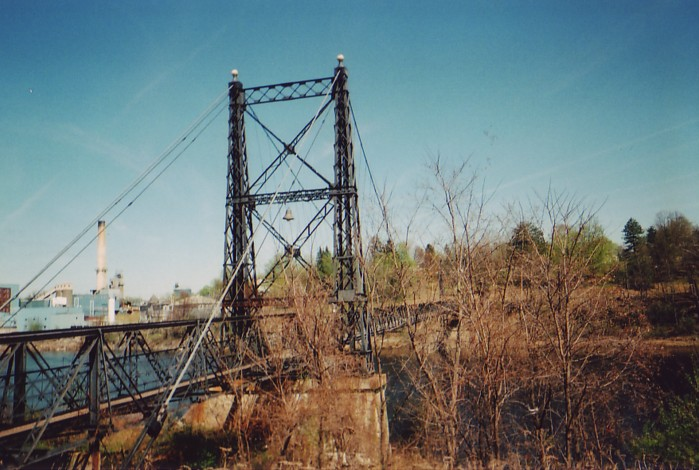
- View from the Waterville side of the bridge
- Coordinates: 44°33′03″N 69°37′34″W
- Carries: Pedestrians
- Crosses: Kennebec River
- Locale: Waterville-Winslow, Maine
- Official name: Ticonic Footbridge

Characteristics
- Design: Suspension bridge
- Width: 6 feet (2 m)
- Longest span: 400 feet (122 m)

History
- Opened: 1903

Location
- Interactive map of Two Cent Bridge

The Ticonic Footbridge, popularly known as the Two Cent Bridge or the Two Penny Bridge, is a suspension bridge that spans the Kennebec River between the city of Waterville and the town of Winslow in Kennebec County, Maine. It is one of the oldest surviving wire-cable steel suspension bridges and also is considered to be the last known extant toll footbridge in the United States.

== History ==
The original footbridge was constructed in 1901 by Edwin Dwight Graves of the Berlin Construction Company. The bridge was owned by Ticonic Foot Bridge Company, which gave the bridge its official name. It was intended to give workers coming from Temple Street in Waterville easy access to Hollingsworth & Whitney Company (later Scott Paper Company) mills across the Kennebec in Winslow. The original toll was one cent, which was collected at a booth on the Waterville side of the river. However, less than a year after its opening on December 15, 1901, the bridge was washed away by high water levels.

The bridge was rebuilt in 1903. The second incarnation of the Ticonic proved to be sturdier, and continued to serve the local population for many years. The toll crossing rose to two cents, where the bridge derived its common name. In the 1960s the footbridge was purchased by a group of townspeople with the intent to preserve it, and doubled the toll to four cents. Eventually the toll was abolished altogether, and ownership taken over by the City of Waterville in 1981.

== Preservation and restoration ==
The Two Cent Bridge was added to the National Register of Historic Places in 1973. While considerable efforts have been put into maintaining the bridge, it has been closed at various points over the years when conditions have made foot crossings unsafe.

On July 4, 1990, the Two Cent Bridge suffered severe structural damage when hundreds of people attending a nearby concert converged on the footpath, straining the bridge's weight and tension limits. The bridge was immediately closed and stabilized; complete restoration took several years. The historic tollbooth was removed but was later restored and replaced at the bridge.

In 2012, the bridge was rehabilitated for continued pedestrian use. The metal grate deck and horizontal wind cables were replaced, and the lattice railing was removed and replaced with a modern railing.

Currently, many civic organizations in the Waterville–Winslow area, including the local Rotary Club, dedicate funds to the bridge's upkeep.

== See also ==
- Hollingsworth & Whitney Company
- National Register of Historic Places listings in Kennebec County, Maine
- List of bridges on the National Register of Historic Places in Maine
