= Frederick Anthoensen =

- Born: 14 April 1882; Tønder Municipality, South Jutland, Denmark
- Died: 13 August 1969 (aged 87); Portland, Maine, U.S.
- Occupation: Publisher
- Spouse: Madeleine Haga (1924–1969; his death)
- Children: Greta Chesley

Frederick Wilhelm Anthoensen (14 April 1882 – 13 August 1969) was a Danish-American printer and publisher. He founded The Anthoensen Press, a successor to The Southworth Press, in 1944. It was in business for 43 years.

== Early life ==
In 1884, aged two, Anthoensen emigrated to the United States with his parents, Peter and Betta, from Tønder Municipality, South Jutland, Denmark. While in the Portland schools system, he gained an interest in printing via the works of Daniel Berkeley Updike and Bruce Rogers, two printers from Boston.

== Career ==
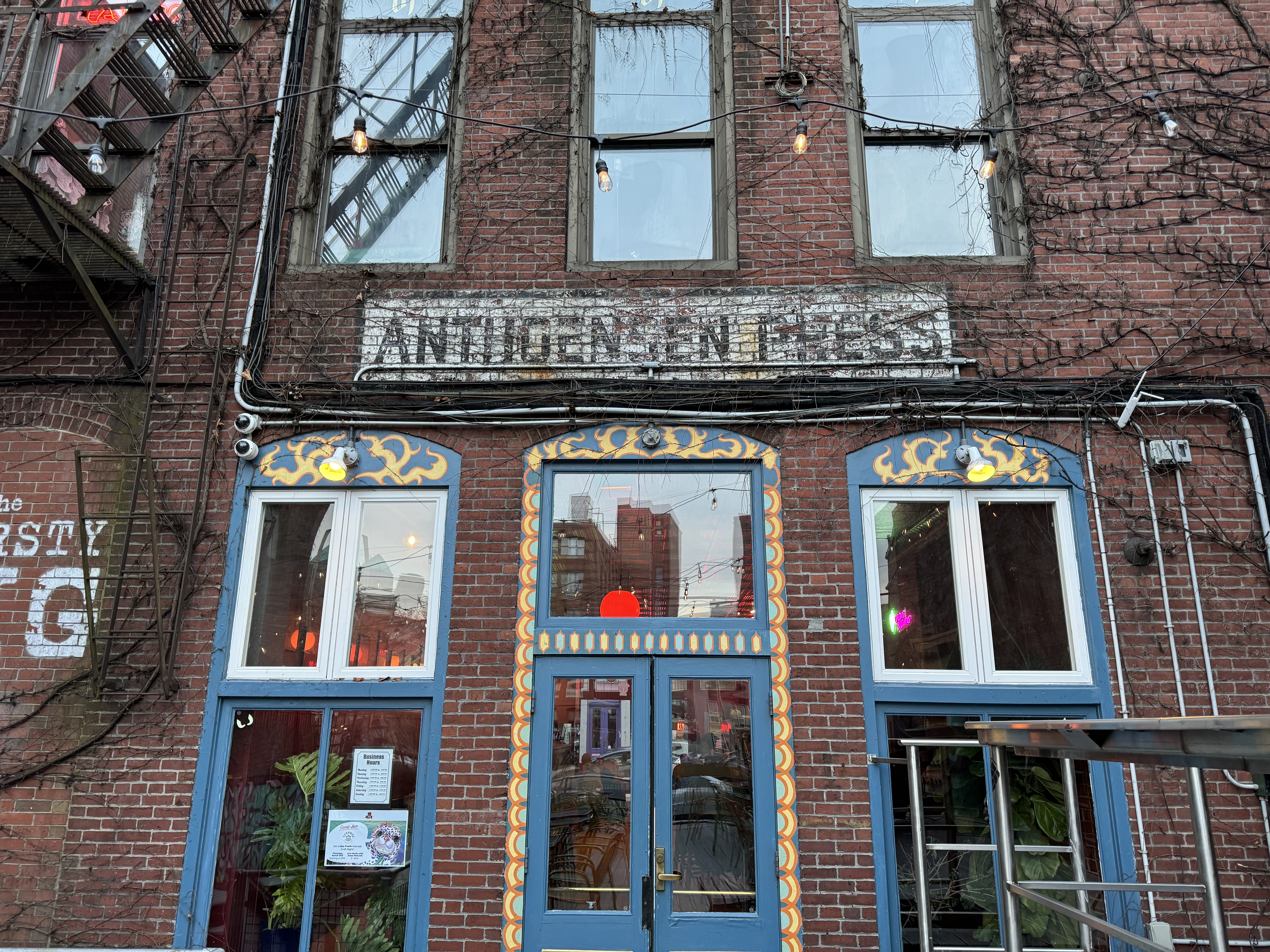
The rear of 37 Exchange Street, which faces Market Street, pictured in 2024

In 1898, a 16-year-old Anthoensen began an apprenticeship at The Southworth Press. He became a full-time compositor in 1901. Sixteen years later, he had become the company's managing director. Anthoensen also wrote two books: John Bell Type: Its Loss and Rediscovery (1939) and Types and Book Making (1943).

Anthoensen broadened the scope of the company's customers beyond the local area, beginning with the Pratt Institute Free Library.

He perpetually searched for old, lost or forgotten types and designs. This led to his possessing the country's largest collection of "rare borders, flowers, and other typographical ornaments" from the 16th to the 18th centuries.

Anthoensen's proof room was known for its ability to process complex academic writing accurately.

From 1920 until after the conclusion of World War II, the Press printed books that were regular inclusions in the American Institute of Graphic Arts' "Fifty Books of the Year" exhibitions. (It was during this period, in 1924, that Anthoensen married Madeleine Hagan, with whom he had one daughter, Greta (1930–2015), who married William L. Chesley in 1953. They were wed for 62 years.)

Anthoensen purchased the company in 1934, initially changing its name to The Southworth–Anthoensen Press, then (by 1944) The Anthoensen Press.

On 7 June 1947, Anthoensen was awarded an honorary degree of Master of Arts from Bowdoin College.

== Death ==
Anthoensen died in 1969, aged 87. He was interred in Pine Grove Cemetery in Falmouth Foreside, Maine. His wife of 45 years survived him by nineteen years, and was buried beside him upon her death in 1988.
