= Sophie Becker (actor and ventriloquist) =

American actor and ventriloquist (born 1993/4)

Sophie Becker (born 1993 or 1994) is an American actor and ventriloquist who is known for "reviving a vaudevillian art form".

== Early life and education ==
Becker grew up in Berkeley, California and studied performance art at Wesleyan University.

== Career ==
Becker's 2020 Off Off Broadway lead-role performance in "Really Really Gorgeous" was reviewed favorably by Jose Solis of the New York Times. Becker was given a Jerry Mahoney dummy by a man she met while line dancing. As the pandemic diminished her acting opportunities, she worked on her ventriloquism skills via YouTube. Becker performed at MOMA's PS 21, Jean's, Roxy Cinema, the Rockaway Film Festival, Night Club 101 and other venues. Her act involved singing together with her Jerry Mahoney dummy and "often lamenting about Jerry’s former fame". Becker noted that ventriloquism eased her fear of having her jokes bomb on stage because she could blame bad writing on the dummy.

As her career progressed, Becker commissioned a second, original dummy she named Ronnie to represent "the New York girl who is my id". Her dummies are made by Austin Phillips.

== Reception ==
When Becker began performing ventriloquism, her roommates found her dummy creepy and did not let her keep it in their common space. Candice Bergen, whose father was ventriloquist Edgar Bergen, said she approved of Becker's endeavor to revive the old art. Becker's show The Jerry Mahoney Success Seminar, co-written by Henry Gunderson, was noted for its postmodern aspects in its setting at the Bonaventure Hotel.
