= Ancient North Yarmouth and Yarmouth, Maine 1636–1936: A History =

Historical publication by William Hutchinson Rowe

- Front cover of the book's 1980 reprint
- Author: William Hutchinson Rowe
- Language: English
- Genre: Genealogy
- Publication date: 1937
- Publication place: United States
- Media type: Hardback book
- Pages: 427
- ISBN: 0788425528

Ancient North Yarmouth and Yarmouth, Maine 1636–1936: A History is a book by William Hutchinson Rowe. It was published in 1937, covering three centuries of the events of North Yarmouth and Yarmouth, Maine. As of the early 21st century, it was still in print. It was Rowe's fourth book, following Yarmouth Personages, an Introduction. An Attempt to Revive the Memory of Individuals Whose Names Were Once Household Words in Old North Yarmouth and Yarmouth (1910), Shipbuilding Days and Tales of the Sea, in Old North Yarmouth and Yarmouth, Maine (1924) and Shipbuilding Days in Casco Bay, 1727–1890: Being Footnotes to the Maritime History of Maine (1929).

In 1923, Rowe announced that a history of Yarmouth was in the works. The project took fourteen more years to complete. The book contains 427 pages, fifteen chapters (plus a detailed appendix), was printed on antique book paper and bound in gold-stamped cloth. It was printed by Portland's Southworth–Anthoensen Press, based at 105 Middle Street. It was on sale for $5 at the time of its initial release.

A new printing of the book was made in 1980 to coincide with the tricentennial celebration of the incorporation of the Town of North Yarmouth.
