= David Daniel (academic) =

American psychologist and academic

David B. Daniel is an American psychologist and academic who is professor emeritus of psychology at James Madison University (JMU). His scholarship has focused on translating findings from psychological science, the science of learning, and neuroscience into educational practice and policy.

== Life ==
Daniel received a B.A. in psychology from San Diego State University and an M.A. and Ph.D. from West Virginia University.

Before joining JMU, Daniel taught at the University of Maine at Farmington. He later became a professor in JMU's Department of Psychology, where he founded the Teaching and Learning Lab.

Daniel was a founding board member of the International Mind, Brain, and Education Society and served for more than a decade as the founding managing editor of the journal Mind, Brain, and Education. In 2018, he served on the National Academies' Committee on How People Learn II: The Science and Practice of Learning, which produced How People Learn II: Learners, Contexts, and Cultures. In 2023, he took retirement and later became a member of JMU's Faculty Emeriti Association.

== Awards and recognition ==
Daniel received the Robert S. Daniel Teaching Excellence Award from the Society for the Teaching of Psychology in 2012. In 2013, he received the Transforming Education Through Neuroscience Award from the Learning & the Brain Foundation and the International Mind, Brain and Education Society. By 2015, he was a Fellow of the Association for Psychological Science. In 2018, he was named a JMU Distinguished Teacher Award recipient. He is also received IMBES Service Award in 2009.
