= Winslow Public Schools =

School district in Maine, United States

Winslow Public Schools is a school district in Winslow, Maine. The superintendent of schools is Peter A. Thiboutot, who was formerly the assistant superintendent of AOS92 until 2018. The Winslow Superintendent's Office is located at 20 Dean Street in Winslow, next to the Winslow Elementary School. Winslow Public Schools has roughly 1,200 students.

== Schools ==
- Winslow High School
- Winslow Junior High School
- Winslow Elementary School

For students at the WHS, they can choose to attend Mid Maine Technical Center (MMTC) for part of the day at Waterville High School.

== History ==
In 1969 the district had a proposal for the building of a new elementary school.

Beginning circa 2003 the board debated whether the grade configuration of the district schools should be modified. The idea of having a joint high school for Winslow and Waterville was presented. Colin Hickey of the Morning Sentinel stated that this was "The most controversial choice" of the options presented at the meeting.

For many years, Winslow was a member of School Union No. 52, which also included China and Vassalboro. School Union 52 dissolved in 2009 when AOS 92 was formed under a new state law. In 2018, Kennebec Valley Consolidated Schools (KVCS) AOS 92 dissolved, and Winslow returned to being a separate school district.

Anticipating the dissolution of AOS 92, the board of trustees of the district hired Peter Thiboutot as its superintendent; all members of the board agreed. Thiboutot at the time was assistant superintendent to AOS 92.

In the COVID-19 pandemic in Maine, the State of Maine had rules stating that six feet needed to be between school employees and students, and between students there needed to be three feet apart. The school district administration realized that the building structures made this impossible, so they did not augment the amount of in person learning as of April 2021.

== Administrators ==
- Peter A. Thiboutot – superintendent of schools
