= Sharon H. Abrams =

American nonprofit executive

- Born: Waterville, Maine
- Education: University of Maine at Farmington
- Years active: 1973—present
- Employer: Maine Children's Home for Little Wanderers
- Spouse: Don Abrams
- Children: 2
- Awards: Maine Women's Hall of Fame, 2004

Sharon H. Abrams is an American nonprofit executive. She was the executive director of the Maine Children's Home for Little Wanderers, a nonprofit agency in Waterville, Maine, from 1992 to 2015. She began working at the Home as a teacher in 1973 and was subsequently promoted to program head, assistant executive director, and executive director. Since retiring from the latter position, she continues to work at the Home as a volunteer and social worker. She was inducted into the Maine Women's Hall of Fame in 2004.

== Early life and education ==
Sharon Abrams was born in Waterville, Maine. Her father was a shirt cutter at C. F. Hathaway Company for more than four decades. She attended Waterville Senior High School and the University of Maine at Farmington. She is a certified teacher and licensed social worker.

== Career ==
After graduation and marriage, Abrams worked as a substitute teacher in the home economics department of Waterville Senior High School. In 1973 she joined the staff of the Maine Children's Home for Little Wanderers as the first teacher in their Teen Parent School Program, which provides an "alternative" high-school education combined with classes in childcare and parenting for pregnant teens. Abrams taught in the program for eight years until becoming program head from 1982 to 1990. In 1990 she was promoted to assistant executive director of the Home and, in 1992, to executive director.

Abrams retired from the executive directorship on December 31, 2015. She plans to continue working at the Home as a volunteer and social worker.

== Other activities ==
In 1978 the Joseph P. Kennedy Jr. Foundation invited Abrams to participate in a study of its new "curriculum of caring". In 1996 she was appointed as a member of the committee to Study Poverty Among Working Parents in the 117th Maine Legislature.

In 2014 Abrams joined the board of the nonprofit REM (Revitalize the Energy in ME). She is also a member of that group's Youth Homelessness Planning Team.

== Awards and honors ==
In 1979 she was voted one of America's Outstanding Young Women. She was inducted into the Maine Women's Hall of Fame in 2004.

== Personal life ==
Abrams is married and the mother of two. She and her husband Don reside in Winslow.
