= Edward Irvin Scott =

American businessman (1846–1931)

Edward Irvin Scott (known also as "Irvin" or "E.I." Scott) was the founder of Scott Paper Company.

He was born on May 13, 1846, in N. Greenfield, New York, the son of Alexander Hamilton Scott and Sophronia Wood Seymour. He was educated at the District School, Juliet Garner's Select School in West Greenfield and Robb's Boys' Academy at Saratoga Springs, New York. During 1866–67, he studied two terms at Albany State Normal School, and became a school teacher. On September 1, 1867, he joined his brother Thomas Seymour Scott in running a paper commission, which lasted for about 12-years.

On August 22, 1872, he married Sarah Frances "Fannie" Hoyt, the daughter of Rev. Zerah T. Hoyt and Sarah Mariah Foote. They had two children, Arthur Hoyt Scott and Margaret, wife of Owen Moon.

Around 1878, the paper commission failed, and the family lived in Camden, New Jersey,

Irvin and brother Clarence Scott took the remaining proceeds and formed Scott Paper Company. Irvin reportedly borrowed $2,000 from his father-in-law and added the $300 the two brothers had to form the capital stock. Irvin became the first president.

In 1890, the family moved to Swarthmore, Pennsylvania, where he was Chief Burgess 1893–97. A large paper plant was established at Chester, Pennsylvania. Scott Paper Company was very successful, largely due to advertising, which stressed the safety and quality of paper tissue. Toilet paper had been considered an "unmentionable" product prior to this, and this strategy was instrumental in making Scott Paper Company the leading producer of bathroom tissue in the United States by 1890.

On October 08, 1916, Irvin's wife Fannie died, and he later married Fannie E. (Massey) Anderson, a widow. In 1920, Irvin retired from Scott Paper Company and son Arthur Hoyt Scott became the second president. His son-in-law Owen Moon was briefly the third president, after Arthur died in 1927. Irvin died on April 24, 1931, and was interred at Eastlawn Cemetery in Philadelphia.
