= Winslow, Maine =

Town in Maine, United States

- Town
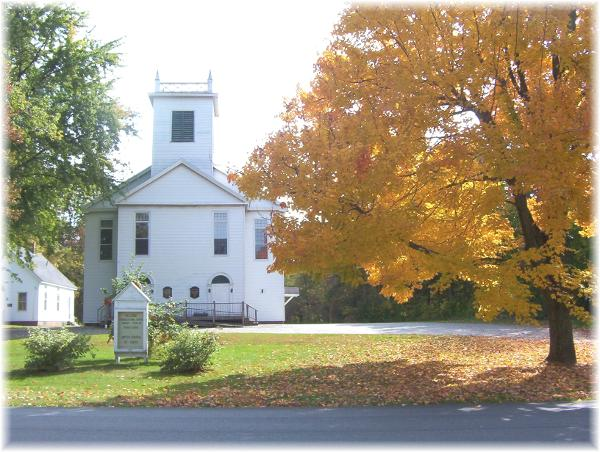
- Congregational Church

- Seal Logo

- Location in Kennebec County and the state of Maine.
- Coordinates: 44°31′40″N 69°36′18″W
- Country: United States
- State: Maine
- County: Kennebec
- Incorporated: April 26, 1771
- Villages: Winslow; East Winslow; Hayden Corner; Lambs Corner; Paines Corner

Area
  - Total: 38.67 sq mi (100.15 km^{2})
  - Land: 36.82 sq mi (95.36 km^{2})
  - Water: 1.85 sq mi (4.79 km^{2})
- Elevation: 230 ft (70 m)

Population (2020)
  - Total: 7,948
  - Density: 887.3/sq mi (342.58/km^{2})
- Time zone: UTC−5 (Eastern (EST))
  - Summer (DST): UTC−4 (EDT)
- ZIP code: 04901
- Area code: 207
- FIPS code: 23-86515
- GNIS feature ID: 582820
- Website: www.winslow-me.gov

Winslow is a town and census-designated place in Kennebec County, Maine, United States, along the Kennebec River across from Waterville. The population was 7,948 at the 2020 census.

== History ==
Winslow was originally an Indian settlement named Taconock. During King William's War, Major Benjamin Church led his third expedition east from Boston in 1692. During this expedition he and 450 troops raided the native villages at both Penobscot (Castine, Maine) and present-day Winslow.

Winslow was then settled by colonists from Plymouth Colony. The area was covered by the land patent given by the English Crown to Pilgrim governor William Bradford and his associates. The earliest settlers had such Old Colony and Pilgrim names as Winslow, Bradford, Warren, and Otis. Descendants of those early settlers can still be found in the town.

In 1754, Fort Halifax was built by order of the Massachusetts General Court on the peninsula at the confluence of the Sebasticook and Kennebec rivers. A settlement subsequently sprang up under its protection, and was named in honor of General John Winslow, of Marshfield, Massachusetts, who had overseen the fort's construction. General Winslow was a descendant of Edward Winslow, a Pilgrim governor of Plymouth Colony who arrived on the Mayflower and founded the town of Marshfield. General Winslow lived in the mansion built in 1699 by his father, Isaac Winslow. The historic Winslow House still stands today in Marshfield and is on the National Register of Historic Places.

The Sebasticook and Kennebec rivers provided major early routes to transport food, goods, and more settlers. Benedict Arnold followed the Kennebec River north in 1775, stopping at Fort Halifax in Winslow on his ill-fated attempt to invade Canada. The Fort Halifax blockhouse, the nation's oldest wooden structure of its type, was rebuilt after the original was swept down the Kennebec River by raging flood waters on April 1, 1987.

Thousands of Irish and French Canadian immigrants used the Old Canada Road (now a scenic byway) section of U.S. Route 201 during the 19th century to find seasonal or project employment, and later made the Kennebec River Valley region their home. Early Winslow settlers used water power for industrial development. Modern Winslow developed around the Hollingsworth & Whitney Company paper mill, located along the Kennebec River. The mill was later purchased by the Scott Paper Company, whose 1995 merger with Kimberly-Clark led to the factory's closure in 1997. Winslow's industrial decline started in the 1980s, although some small light industry still exists, and new businesses continue to move into the town. Despite this, the service sector remains limited. Today, Winslow is a bedroom community for some middle- and upper-middle-class families who work in nearby Waterville and Augusta.

Scenes from the 2005 miniseries Empire Falls, starring Paul Newman, Ed Harris, and Helen Hunt, and based on the 2001 book Empire Falls by Richard Russo, were shot in Winslow. The town was home to the state's largest July 4 fireworks display until it moved to Clinton, Maine in 2016.

== Geography ==
According to the United States Census Bureau, the town has a total area of 38.67 square miles (100.15 km^{2}), of which 36.82 square miles (95.36 km^{2}) is land and 1.85 square miles (4.79 km^{2}) is water. Winslow is located at the confluence of the Sebasticook River with the Kennebec River.

The town is crossed by U.S. Route 201 and State Routes 11, 32, 100 and 137. It borders the towns of Benton to the north, Albion to the east, China to the southeast, Vassalboro to the south, and (across the Kennebec River) Waterville to the west.

== Demographics ==
Historical population
Census	Pop.	Note	%±
1790	797		—
1800	1,250		56.8%
1810	658		−47.4%
1820	935		42.1%
1830	1,263		35.1%
1840	1,722		36.3%
1850	1,796		4.3%
1860	1,739		−3.2%
1870	1,437		−17.4%
1880	1,467		2.1%
1890	1,814		23.7%
1900	2,277		25.5%
1910	2,709		19.0%
1920	3,280		21.1%
1930	3,917		19.4%
1940	4,153		6.0%
1950	4,413		6.3%
1960	5,891		33.5%
1970	7,299		23.9%
1980	8,057		10.4%
1990	7,997		−0.7%
2000	7,743		−3.2%
2010	7,794		0.7%
2020	7,948		2.0%
U.S. Decennial Census

Scott Paper mill (originally Hollingsworth & Whitney) 10 years after the Kimberly Clark closing

=== 2010 census ===
As of the census of 2010, there were 7,794 people, 3,328 households, and 2,183 families living in the town. The population density was 211.7 inhabitants per square mile (81.7/km^{2}). There were 3,692 housing units at an average density of 100.3 per square mile (38.7/km^{2}). The racial makeup of the town was 96.0% White, 0.4% African American, 0.6% Native American, 0.6% Asian, 0.2% from other races, and 2.3% from two or more races. Hispanic or Latino of any race were 1.1% of the population.

There were 3,328 households, of which 28.7% had children under the age of 18 living with them, 50.3% were married couples living together, 10.6% had a female householder with no husband present, 4.7% had a male householder with no wife present, and 34.4% were non-families. 28.1% of all households were made up of individuals, and 13.5% had someone living alone who was 65 years of age or older. The average household size was 2.34 and the average family size was 2.84.

The median age in the town was 43.6 years. 21.8% of residents were under the age of 18; 7% were between the ages of 18 and 24; 23.1% were from 25 to 44; 30% were from 45 to 64; and 17.8% were 65 years of age or older. The gender makeup of the town was 48.0% male and 52.0% female.

=== 2000 census ===
As of the census of 2000, there were 7,743 people, 3,268 households, and 2,212 families living in the town. The population density was 210.1 inhabitants per square mile (81.1/km^{2}). There were 3,591 housing units at an average density of 97.4 per square mile (37.6/km^{2}). The racial makeup of the town was 98.05% White, 0.13% Black or African American, 0.27% Native American, 0.35% Asian, 0.01% Pacific Islander, 0.22% from other races, and 0.97% from two or more races. Hispanic or Latino of any race were 0.77% of the population.

There were 4,268 households, out of which 30.7% had children under the age of 18 living with them, 53.7% were married couples living together, 10.4% had a female householder with no husband present, and 32.3% were non-families. 26.8% of all households were made up of individuals, and 13.5% had someone living alone who was 65 years of age or older. The average household size was 2.35 and the average family size was 2.83.

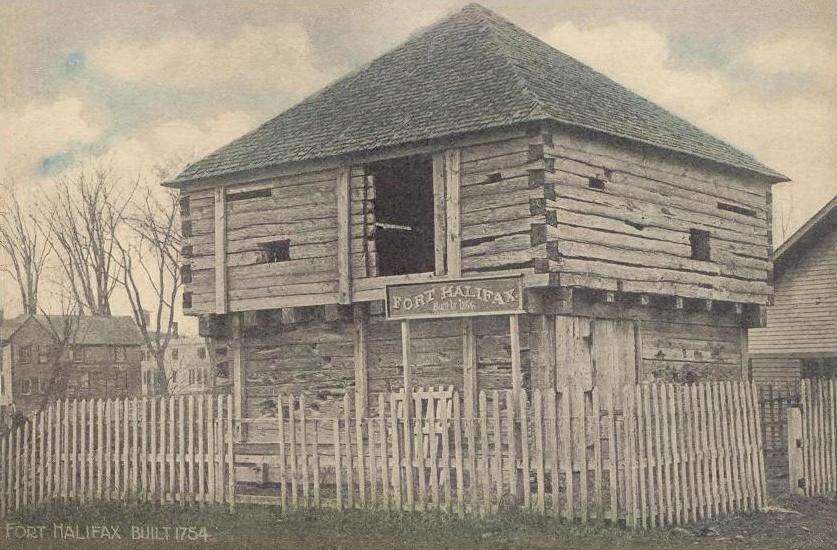
Fort Halifax c. 1905

In the town, the population was spread out, with 24.1% under the age of 18, 6.3% from 18 to 24, 27.0% from 25 to 44, 24.6% from 45 to 64, and 18.0% who were 65 years of age or older. The median age was 41 years. For every 100 females, there were 90.6 males. For every 100 females age 18 and over, there were 86.0 males.

The median income for a household in the town was $39,580, and the median income for a family was $46,725. Males had a median income of $37,116 versus $25,429 for females. The per capita income for the town was $18,501. About 3.7% of families and 7.0% of the population were below the poverty line, including 7.1% of those under age 18 and 9.9% of those age 65 or over.

== Economy ==
For much of the 20th century, the area's paper mills were the centerpiece of the local economy. Johnny’s Selected Seeds, an employee owned company selling seeds to vegetable gardeners across the United States, relocated their headquarters to Winslow in 2002. Major employers in Winslow include Mid-State Machine Products, Elanco (formerly Lohmann Animal Health International), Orion Rope Works, and AnalytiChem.

== Government ==
Winslow has a town council government. A town manager handles day-to-day affairs.

== Education ==
Winslow Public Schools has three public schools in two buildings in town. There was a private Catholic grammar school (St. John's) until 2020, when it closed due to declining enrollment. Winslow High School, completed in 2008, is a $9,000,000 renovation project. A second renovation project, adding a junior high wing and band room, plus expanding a gym and cafeteria was completed in 2020. Winslow Elementary School houses grades Pre-K–6. The middle school houses grades 7–8. The high school houses grades 9–12. There is no college.

The middle school used to house grades 6–8 at 6 Danielson Street until 2020 when it closed due to an aging and an unreliable building. Then the 6th graders went to Winslow Elementary and the 7th and 8th graders went to Winslow High School in a new wing.

It was a part of Kennebec Valley Consolidated Schools (AOS92) until July 1, 2018.

== Sites of interest ==
- Two Cent Bridge
- Fort Halifax

== Notable people ==
- Sharon H. Abrams, executive director, Maine Children's Home for Little Wanderers
- Mike Cowan, golf caddy
- Joshua Cushman, minister, US congressman
- Charles Fletcher Johnson, US senator
- Sharon Lee, science-fiction author
- Stan Meserve, racing driver
- Steve Miller, science-fiction author
- Frank Pooler, Wisconsin state legislator and businessman
- Thomas Rice, US congressman
- Samuel Francis Smith, minister, author
