= Frank Pooler (politician) =

American businessman and politician

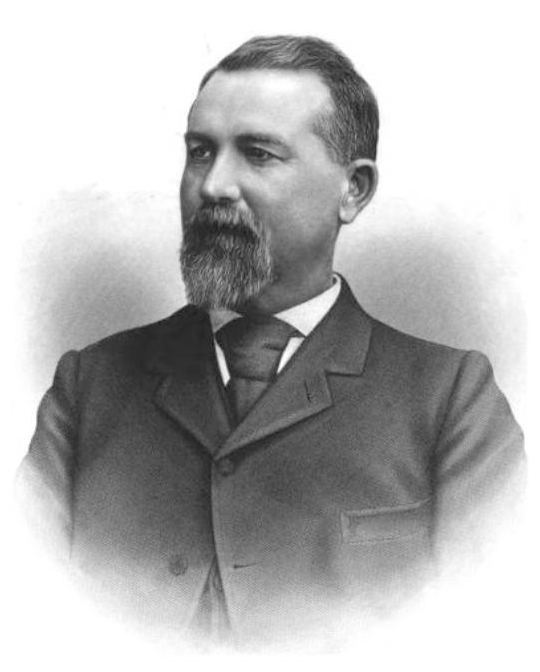

Member of the Wisconsin State Assembly
- In office 1882
- Constituency: La Crosse County

Personal details
- Born: October 23, 1847 Winslow, Maine
- Died: March 18, 1900 (aged 52) Savanna, Illinois
- Party: Republican
- Spouse: Frances Cornelia Nichols (m. 1870)
- Children: 4
- Occupation: Businessman, politician

Frank Pooler (October 23, 1847 – March 18, 1900) was an American businessman and politician.

== Biography ==
Frank Pooler was born in Winslow, Maine on October 23, 1847. He moved to Onalaska, Wisconsin and was involved in the lumber business. He moved to Clarksville, Missouri and lived there for two years before returning to Onalaska. He was also president of a railway company.

He married Frances Cornelia Nichols on January 6, 1870, and they had four children.

He served in the Wisconsin State Assembly in 1882, as a Republican. He also served on the La Crosse County, Wisconsin Board of Supervisors, as county treasurer, and mayor of Onalaska, Wisconsin.

He died in Savanna, Illinois of a stroke on March 18, 1900, while visiting some friends.
