= The Anthoensen Press =

American publisher

- Founded: 1875
- Founder: Francis B. Southworth
- Defunct: 1987 (39 years ago)
- Country of origin: United States
- Headquarters location: Portland, Maine
- Publication types: Books, journals
- Fiction genres: Fiction and non-fiction
- Owners: Francis B. Southworth (1875–1934); Frederick Anthoensen (1934–1969; his death); Warren F. Skillings; Harry Milliken; Henry C. Thomas (1983–1987)

The Anthoensen Press, also known as Southworth Press, was an American publishing company based in Portland, Maine, in operation between 1875 and 1987. Named for its second owner, Danish-born Frederick Anthoensen, the company was nationally renowned for the quality of the books it created. It published works for several educational institutions, including Bowdoin College, Colby College, as well as for the Peabody Essex Museum, the Boston Athenaeum, the Massachusetts Historical Society and the Limited Editions Club. For part of the 20th century, the Press was located at 105 Middle Street in Portland, before moving to 37 Exchange Street (later expanding into 45 Exchange Street), a space occupied by The Thirsty Pig as of 2023.

The Press also published scholarly journals, including The New England Quarterly, The American Neptune, The Papers of the Bibliographical Society of America and The American Oxonian.

Its 1937 publication, Ancient North Yarmouth and Yarmouth, Maine 1636–1936: A History, covering three centuries of nearby Yarmouth's past, written by William Hutchinson Rowe, was still in publication as of the early 21st century.

== History ==
Founded, as the Southworth Press, by the Revd. Francis B. Southworth (1824–1912) in 1875, it published religious material that was given to sailors. (Southworth was the pastor of the Seamen's Bethel Church on Fore Street in Portland, Maine.) The Press used linotype machines for its compositions. The composition of certain titles, including A. S. W. Rosenbach's Early American Children's Books (1933), was done by hand.

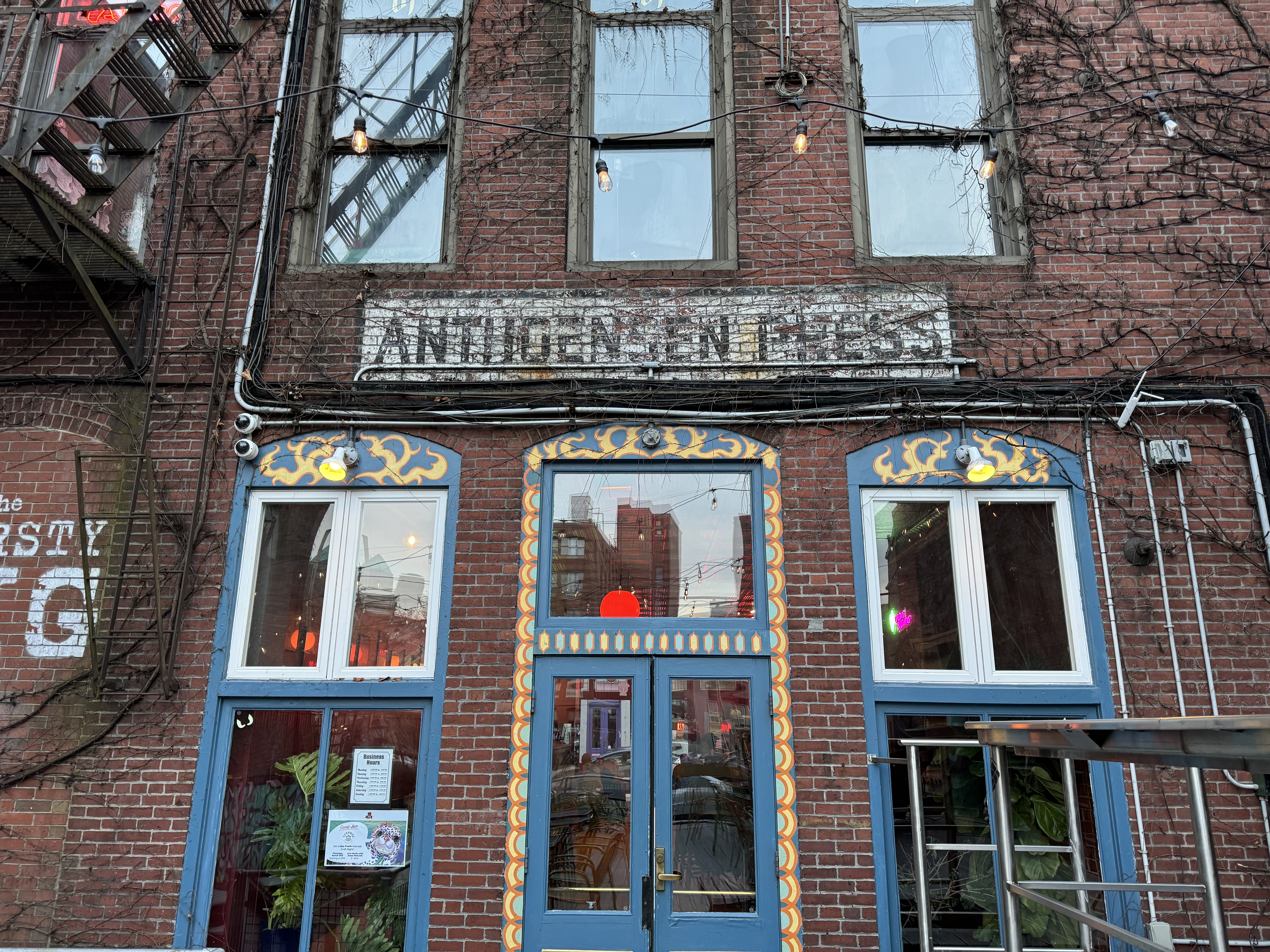
The rear of 37 Exchange Street, which faces Market Street, pictured in 2024

The company kept its name beyond the 1969 death of Anthoensen, starting with its takeover by Warren F. Skillings, firstly, then Harry Milliken. Henry C. Thomas purchased the press in 1982. In 1985, Thomas published The New Anthoensen: In Memory of Fred Anthoensen, 1882–1969, a four-page book containing a two-page letter by Thomas.

In 1983, under Thomas, the company modernized with the introduction of computerized typesetting, to run alongside the traditional linotype and letterpress machines. This outlay did not pay off, however, for the company could not keep up with larger competitors. It went out of business in 1987, after 112 years.
