= Winslow High School (Maine) =

Location
- 20 Danielson Street; Winslow, Maine; United States
- Coordinates: 44.5505606°N 69.6191115°W

Information
- Type: Public
- School district: Winslow Public Schools
- Superintendent: Peter Thiboutot
- Principal: Chad Bell
- Grades: 9-12
- Enrollment: 383 (2024-2025)
- Colors: Black and Orange
- Mascot: Black Raider
- Nickname: Simply the "Raiders"
- Website: www.winslowk12.org

Winslow High School is a four-year public high school located in Winslow, Maine, United States. Winslow serves the community of Winslow and is open to high school students from the towns of Vassalboro, Maine, and China, Maine (of Regional School Unit 18) at a tuition cost since there is no public high school in either town. It is a part of Winslow Public Schools.

It was a part of Kennebec Valley Consolidated Schools (AOS92) until July 1, 2018.

== School philosophy ==
As quoted by Winslow's former Principal Doug Carville, the school's "philosophy is to tailor education to meet the needs of each individual. We have a safe and friendly school climate where the administration, faculty and staff are committed to students of all ages".

== Athletics ==
Winslow offers several freshmen, junior varsity, and varsity sports that students participate in throughout the school year.

- Fall
  - Boys Soccer
  - Cheering
  - Cross Country
  - Field Hockey
  - Football
  - Girls Soccer
  - Golf
- Winter
  - Boys Basketball
  - Boys Ice Hockey
  - Cheering
  - Girls Basketball
  - Girls Ice Hockey
  - Indoor Track
  - Swimming
  - Unified Basketball
  - Wrestling
- Spring
  - Baseball
  - Softball
  - Tennis
  - Track and Field
  - Boys and Girls Lacrosse

The high school athletic council was formed in 1975.

== Notable alumni ==
- David LaFountain, a retired fire chief and state senator from Winslow, Maine
