= Austin Phillips =

American ventriloquist and puppet maker

- Born: 1992 or 1993 (age 33–34); Beverly, Massachusetts
- Occupations: Ventriloquist, puppet maker

Austin Phillips is an American ventriloquist and dummy and puppet maker. He formerly performed as an active ventriloquist, and is currently one of the few full time dummy makers in the country. His studio in Portland is considered a tourist stop.

== Biography ==
Phillips was born in Beverly, Massachusetts, but moved to York, Maine at a young age. At 5, he became interested in puppets after viewing a dummy Charlie McCarthy in a store window. He got a dummy for Christmas, and soon began learning to be a ventriloquist. He brought a dummy wherever he went during this time, and appeared with one in most of his yearbook photos.

By age 14, he had begun building his own wooden puppets and tinkering with machines. He has recounted an incident wherein he used a key he received from his father to access the art room at midnight and make molds, and where the police department inquired.

He went on to study technical theater at the University of Maine at Farmington, where he began selling dummies from his dorm room. In high school and college, he took advantage of his father's airplane benefits to travel and learn directly from professionals. He has stated that during that time, he would "get picked up from the airport and hope (he) wouldn't get put in shackles in a basement." At 20, he stopped performing his own acts, which he stated was due to laziness in practicing, but continued making dummies. He became a full-time dummy maker at 22, and moved into his own studio in Portland in 2019.

He is one of the world's only full-time professional makers of ventriloquist dummies. He has stated that at first, he emphasized perfection, but he has since leaned into imperfections, stating that "I started realizing people responded more when things were a little more painterly, a little more playful." He has stated that he "just know(s) when something's right." in his puppets and dummies.

One of his specialties are the leather moving pieces in early 1900s pieces. He doesn't use disposable or breakable parts such as plastic. He has stated his dummies are like "kinetic art objects" to him.

He has done work for Sophie Becker, a NBC show, and historical puppets. He has helped curate a museum exhibit in England. He is the subject of New Hampshire PBS documentary The Puppet Master. His business is considered a tourist stop, as he also collects dummies and Halloween decorations.
