= International Plaza (Pennsylvania) =

Office complex in Pennsylvania, United States

Coordinates: 39.874072°N 75.257259°W

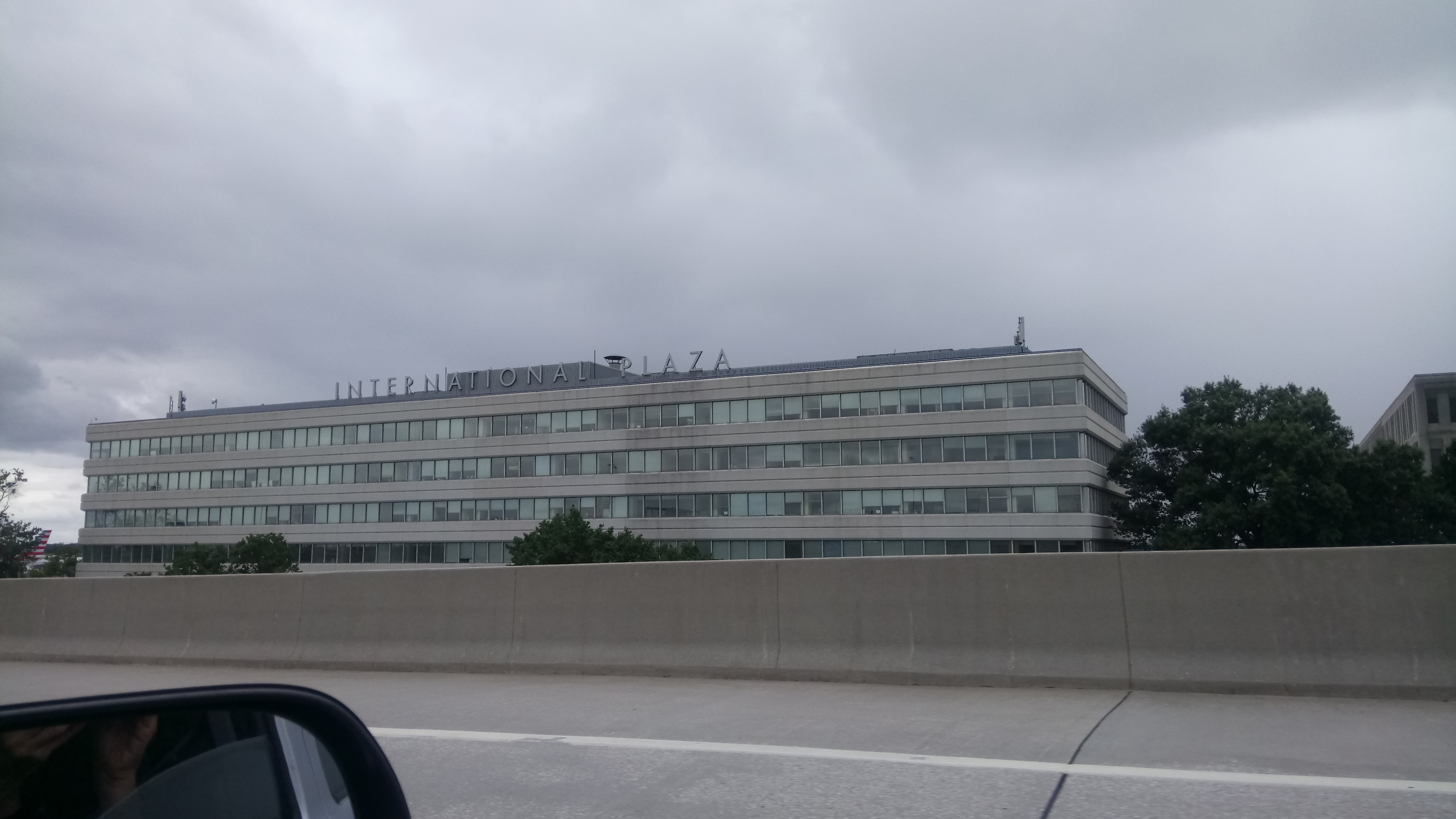
International Plaza

International Plaza, formerly known as Scott Plaza, is an office complex in Tinicum Township, Delaware County, Pennsylvania. It is the former corporate headquarters of the Scott Paper Company. The facility is next to the Philadelphia International Airport and south of Pennsylvania Route 291.

== History ==
Plaza I was completed in 1961. Plaza II was completed after 1961. Plaza III was completed in 1969. At one time there were 1,200 Scott Paper employees working at the complex.

Albert J. Dunlap took control of Scott Paper in 1994. Shortly afterwards, he began to move the headquarters, and its employees, off of the premises. Shortly after the takeover, several hundred employees worked at the facility. Scott Paper's headquarters moved to Boca Raton, Florida before the company was finally acquired by Kimberly Clark.

After the headquarter's relocation, Koll Bren bought the complex for $39 million. On December 30, 1997 the headquarters of Franklin Acceptance Corp. and ProCredit Inc. opened at International Plaza. The immediate parent company of both companies was Copelco Financial Services Group, with the ultimate parent company being Itochu. In 1998 Colburn Insurance Service moved into about 36,000 square feet (3,300 m^{2}) of space in One International Plaza.

By 1999 K/B Fund II was the owner of the complex. In July 1999 the Pennsylvania Department of Transportation (PennDot) and several U.S. federal government agencies selected a proposed route for the connecting ramps from the northbound and southbound portions of Interstate 95 to the Terminal One complex, under development, at Philadelphia International Airport; the agency attempted to avoid the John Heinz National Wildlife Refuge at Tinicum. However K/B Fund II objected to the proposed routing, stating that it would interfere with the International Plaza development. It entered a filing in the U.S. Court of Appeals for the Third Circuit to challenge the proposed routing. In 2000 the airport attempted to acquire the complex for $90 million but Tinicum Township commissioners stopped the deal from going forward, citing concerns of a loss of tax revenue for the township and the Interboro School District which serves Tinicum, as well as noise pollution concerns.

As of 2002 it comprised 654,000-square-foot (60,800 m^{2}) of office space on 55-acre (22 ha) of land. The three buildings that it consisted of were Plaza I, Plaza II, and Plaza III. Plaza I had 188,000 square feet (17,500 m^{2}) of space. Plaza II had 300,000-square-foot (28,000 m^{2}) of space. Plaza III had 166,000 square feet (15,400 m^{2}) of space; it served as Scott's research and development facility; Plaza III no longer exists. The complex was constructed for the purpose of serving as Scott's headquarters.

As of 2002 several acres of land were leased to be used as parking for airport patrons. In 2002 the owner, Koll Bren Schreiber Realty Advisors, listed the complex for sale, making it the second time it had been placed on the market in a three-year period by Koll Bren Schreiber. Plaza III was demolished in 2003.

In 2005 Amerimar acquired the complex.

In 2008 Angelo, Gordon & Co. and affiliates of Amerimar Enterprises Inc. owned the facility as part of a joint venture.
