= Hollingsworth & Whitney Company =

American paper company

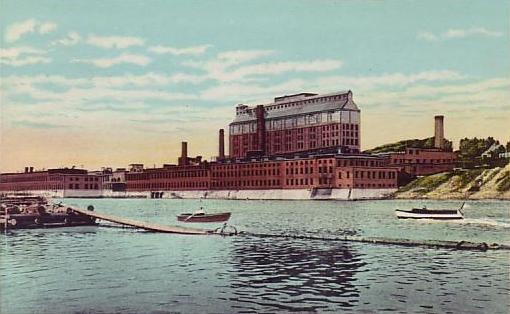
- The mill around 1920
- Industry: Pulp and paper
- Founded: 1892; 134 years ago
- Defunct: 1997
- Fate: Acquired by Kimberly-Clark; Mills shut down
- Headquarters: Winslow, Maine, United States

The Hollingsworth & Whitney Company was a pulp and paper company that owned one or more pulp and paper mills in Winslow, Maine. The company opened in 1892, providing work for Waterville residents who lived on the far bank of the Kennebec River. A footbridge was constructed in 1901 so the citizens of Waterville could commute to Winslow. The bridge became known as the Two Cent Bridge due to the price of its toll.

The Hollingsworth & Whitney mills once produced 235 tons of paper per day. Business became so successful that in early 1900, "the owners of the mill opened a 'club house' on site so that the employees could relax while playing pool, bowling, reading in the library, or swimming in the pool."

== Merging and acquisition ==
During the 1950s, Hollingsworth & Whitney became a division of Scott Paper Company. Around mid-1994, Kimberly-Clark acquired the mills from Scott Paper. In 1997 the mills were shut down and most of the equipment was stripped from the complex.
