= Scott Paper Company =

American paper company (1879–1995)

- Industry: Personal care
- Founded: 1879; 147 years ago, in Philadelphia, Pennsylvania
- Fate: Acquired by Kimberly-Clark
- Products: Toilet paper, paper towels
- Parent: Kimberly-Clark

The Scott Paper Company was a manufacturer and marketer of sanitary tissue products with operations in 22 countries. Its products were sold under a variety of well-known brand names, including Scott Tissue, Cottonelle, Baby Fresh, Scottex and Viva. Consolidated sales of its consumer and commercial products totalled approximately $3.6 billion in 1994.

The company was acquired by the Kimberly-Clark Corporation in 1995.

== History ==
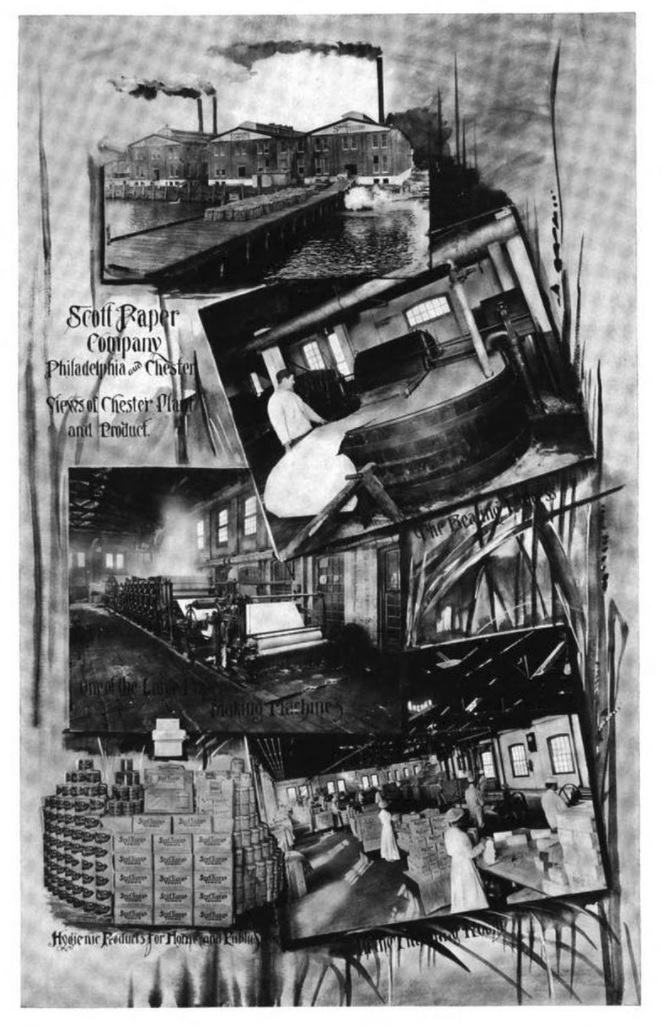
Scott Paper Company Plant in Chester, Pennsylvania

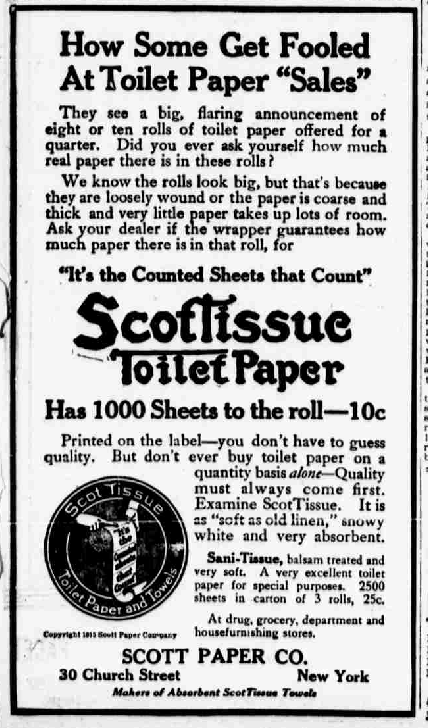
1915 newspaper ad for the toilet paper made by the company.

Scott Paper was founded in 1879 in Philadelphia by brothers E. Irvin Scott and Clarence Scott, and is often credited as being the first to market toilet paper sold on a roll. Due to the nature of the product, at first they did not sell the toilet roll using the Scott name, instead dealers sold the products to consumers using many different brand names. In 1902 they acquired Waldorf, which was the eldest branded toilet roll in the United States, which they continued to market. In 1903 they began to use the Scott name on their products. They started to market paper towels in 1907, and paper tissues in the 1930s.

In 1927, Scott purchased a Nova Scotian pulp mill, and thus began a long series of acquisitions. It joined with The Mead Corporation in 1936 to form Brunswick Pulp & Paper Company, which used their pulp mill in Georgia to supply both Mead and Scott. The company then bought mills in New York and Wisconsin, and during the 1950s Scott merged with Soundview Pulp Company and Hollingsworth & Whitney Company, which provided timberlands and mills in Washington, Alabama, and Maine.

Scott enjoyed success throughout the 20th century due to their advertising methods, which can be traced back to Arthur Scott, the son of E. Irvin Scott. He positioned the product as having health benefits and ran adverts in health magazines, drugstores and in the health part of newspapers. An advert from 1936 asked "Is your washroom breeding Bolsheviks?", suggesting that cheap toilet paper might turn employees to Communism.

Despite the effects of the Great Depression, Scott did not have to reduce their workforce at all, and ran the highest amount of advertising in the industry. Scott also continued to perform well during World War II, even though there were paper shortages. By 1948 the company was achieving annual sales of almost $75 million, but by the 1960s there were an increasing number of competitors. In 1965 they diversified into plastic coatings when they acquired the Plastic Coating Corporation, and in 1967 they acquired a fine book producer, S.D. Warren. Increased competition, acquisitions not performing as expected, and regulatory and capital investments led to difficult trading conditions in the 1970's, but by 1984 the business was performing well again.

In December 1994, Scott sold its printing and publishing papers business, consisting of its wholly owned subsidiary, S.D. Warren, for approximately $1.6 billion.

== Merger with Kimberly-Clark ==
In 1995, Scott Paper merged with Kimberly-Clark, The new company used the name Kimberly-Clark and maintained the Scott Paper product names. Scott Paper Limited, its subsidiary in Canada, was sold and became Kruger Inc. As part of the sale of the company, the Baby Fresh baby wipes brand was sold to Procter & Gamble and is now sold under the Pampers brand. The Scotties facial tissue brand in the United States was sold to Irving Tissue. Other divested brands include Cut-Rite, a brand of waxed paper, which was sold to Reynolds Metals in 1986.

== Headquarters ==
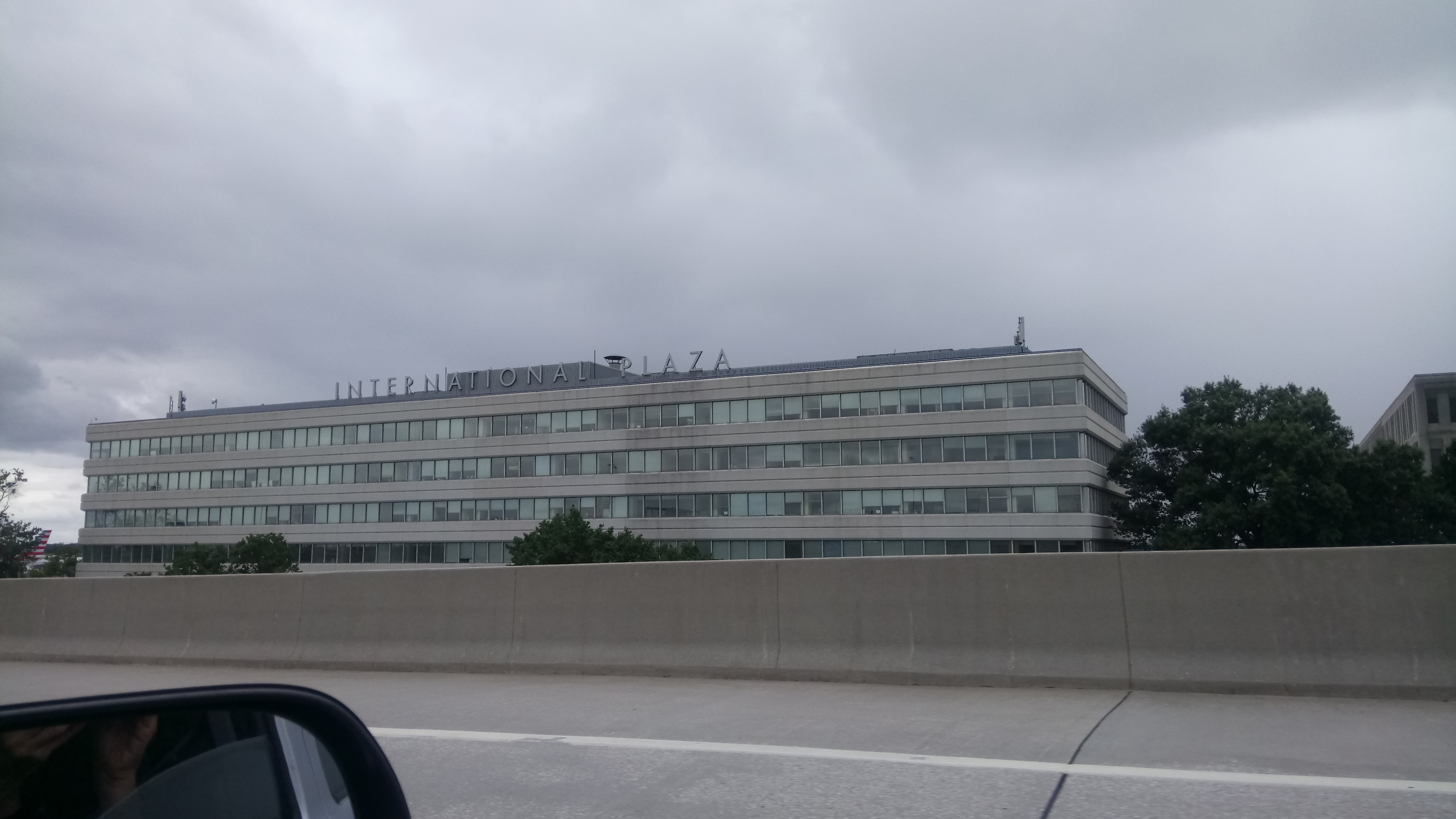
International Plaza

The headquarters of the company for many years was located at International Plaza (known then as Scott Plaza) in Tinicum Township, Delaware County, Pennsylvania, in Greater Philadelphia. The complex at that time consisted of three buildings known as Plaza I, Plaza II, and Plaza III. Plaza I was completed in 1961. Plaza II was completed after 1961. Plaza III was completed in 1969. The complex was constructed for the purpose of serving as Scott's headquarters.

== See also ==
- Albert J. Dunlap
- Kleenex
- Kimberly-Clark
