= Maine Children's Home for Little Wanderers =

Nonprofit agency

Maine Children's Home
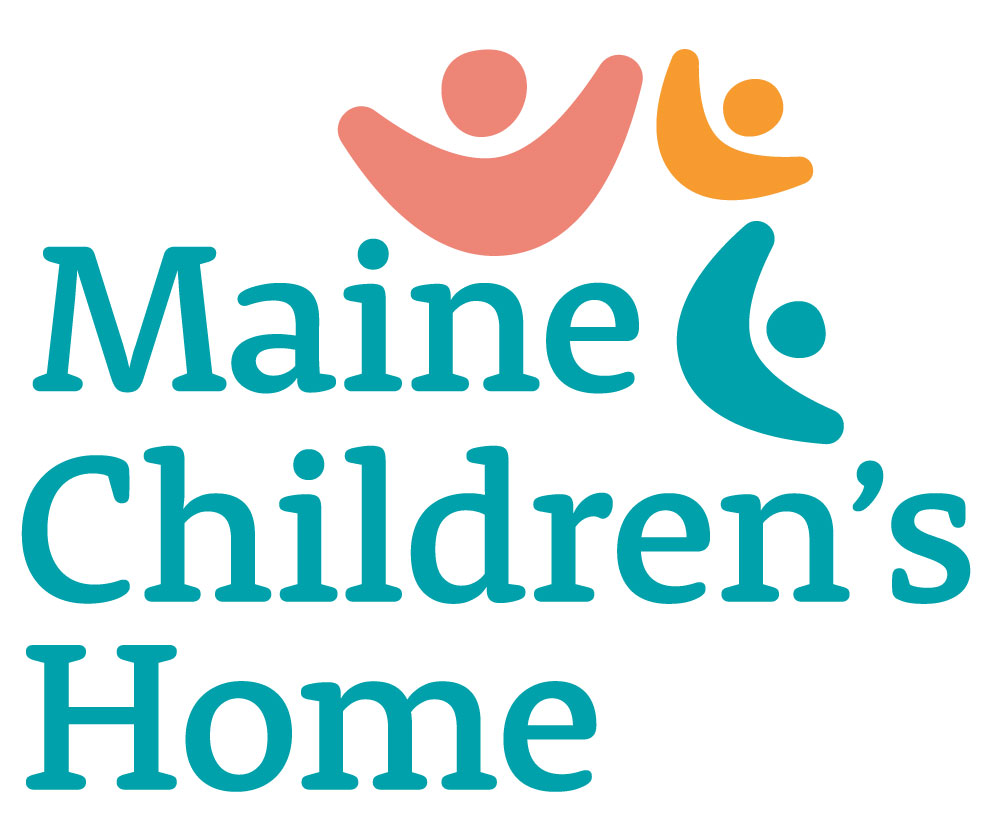
- This is the logo of Maine Children's Home that was introduced in 2021.
- Predecessor: Maine Children's Home Society
- Formation: 25 July 1962
- Founded at: Waterville, Maine
- Merger of: The Home for Little Wanderers
- Type: NGO
- Legal status: Charity
- Headquarters: Waterville, Maine
- Services: Education, counseling, adoptions, day care, and early childhood education services for pregnant teens and teen parents
- Executive Director: Candace Marriner
- Budget: $1.9 million
- Staff: 40
- Website: mainechildrenshome.org

Maine Children's Home (MCH) (also known as Maine Children's Home for Little Wanderers) is a nonprofit agency in Waterville, Maine, that provides education, counseling, adoption, day care, and early childhood education services for pregnant teens and teen parents. Founded as an orphanage in 1899 and incorporated as the Maine Children's Home Society in 1901, it began dealing solely with adoptions in 1915. It merged with the Maine branch of The Home for Little Wanderers of Massachusetts in 1962, creating the Maine Children's Home for Little Wanderers. In 1973 it introduced an "alternative" high school program for pregnant teens and teen parents.

== History ==
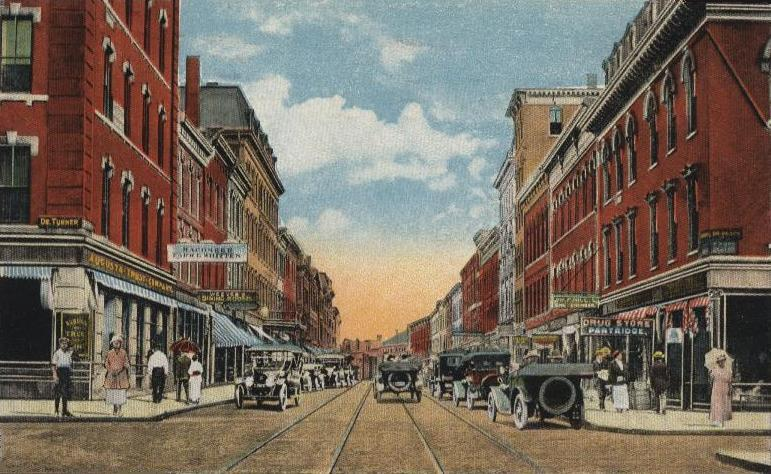
Postcard view of Water Street, Augusta, Maine, c. 1920

The Home originally opened as a private orphanage on April 10, 1899, in Augusta to care for children living on the streets or in financially unstable homes. Funded by donations from local residents, the institution provided food, clothing, and shelter for 28 children in its inaugural year. It was incorporated as The Maine Children's Home Society in 1901. It also began offering an adoption service to help place children who needed homes. By 1915, the expansion of the foster care movement obviated the need for an orphanage and it was closed, but the adoption service continued to operate. In the 1930s, some of the infants waiting for adoption were used as "practice babies" by home economics students at the Farmington State Normal School.

In the 1950s the Home started its annual Christmas gift box program, which sends toys, games, and clothing to impoverished children statewide.

On July 25, 1962, the Maine Children's Home Society merged with the Maine branch of The Home for Little Wanderers of Massachusetts, creating Maine Children's Home for Little Wanderers. The merged institution, now based in Waterville, provided adoption services together with "foster care, counseling, diagnostic study, case work with unmarried parents, and summer camp scholarships".

In 1973 the Home launched its Teen Parent School Program, which offers an "alternative" high-school education for pregnant teens.

The Home acquired a campus with five buildings in Waterville in 2001 with major support from the Harold Alfond Foundation.

In 2011 the Home was accredited for international adoption under the Hague Adoption Convention.

== Services ==
=== Adoption services ===
Maine Children's Home is a licensed private agency for adoptions and child placement. It is one of ten licensed adoption agencies in the state. The agency facilitates domestic and international adoptions, home studies, post-adoption services, and counseling for birth parents, adoptive parents, and adoptees. It places between 10 and 14 children annually.

=== Teen Parent School Program ===
An "alternative" educational program offers high-school classes, parenting guidance, childcare guidance, and counseling for pregnant teens and teen parents. The majority of students are girls, although classes and support groups are available for teen fathers. Students can enroll for up to four years, attending classes even after they give birth, and child care is available free of charge. In its first 40 years, this program graduated approximately 1,000 students. The program enrolls an average of 20 students per year.

=== Daycare and early childhood education ===
The day care and early childhood education program accommodates 55 children annually.

=== Outpatient mental health counseling ===
Outpatient mental health counseling is provided for 200 clients per year.

=== Christmas gift boxes ===
Toys, games, and clothing are distributed to impoverished children statewide each Christmas season. In 2012 this program benefited more than 1,600 children.

=== Summer camp scholarships ===
Summer camp scholarships are provided for over 150 children statewide.

== Fundraising ==
The Home runs its own fundraisers and solicits corporate sponsorships. In-house fundraisers include an annual dinner and an annual Lobster Roll Lunch, which in 2014 raised $7,000 for the Christmas gift box distribution. Corporate sponsors include the Ray Haskell Ford Lincoln dealership, which runs an annual ice fishing tournament in support of the Home, the Atlantic Music Festival, and 10 credit unions making up the Kennebec Valley Chapter of Credit Unions.

== Staff ==
In January 2016 Richard Dorian became executive director of Maine Children's Home. He succeeded Sharon H. Abrams, who joined the staff in 1973 as the first teacher in the Teen Parent School Program and served as executive director from 1992 to 2015. Abrams continues to work at the Home as a volunteer and social worker.

== Awards ==
The Home received a 2003 Certificate of Achievement and a 2000 Community Service Award from the Mid-Maine Chamber of Commerce, a 1999 Giraffe Award from the Maine Children's Alliance, and a Business of the Year Award from the Waterville Business and Professional Women. Longtime employee and executive director Sharon H. Abrams was inducted into the Maine Women's Hall of Fame in 2004.
