= Lure Fishbar =

Restaurant information
- Established: 2004
- Owner: John McDonald
- Head chef: Preston Clark
- Food type: Seafood, Sushi, Raw Bar
- Dress code: Smart casual
- Location: 142 Mercer Street, New York, New York, 10012, United States
- Website: www.lurefishbar.com

Lure Fishbar is a seafood restaurant in the SoHo neighborhood of New York City. It was founded by restauranteurs John McDonald and Josh Pickard in 2004. It is known for its yacht-inspired interior.

== History ==
Lure Fishbar opened in SoHo in 2004. It opened in the space previously occupied by one of McDonald's other restaurants, Canteen.

In 2013, McDonald opened a second Lure Fishbar location in Miami, Florida.

Preston Clark was appointed executive chef of Lure Fishbar in 2016.

In 2024, a media controversy ensued after it was reported that fashion house Prada was seeking to take over the space occupied by Lure Fishbar. Public figures such as Ken Burns, Cindy Crawford, and Heidi Klum campaigned against the restaurant's removal. Vanity Fair reported that there were currently no discussions to remove the restaurant from its location.

The restaurant serves raw and grilled fish dishes such as sushi and seafood pasta, as well as American-style desserts. It has also served dishes such as dim sum.

In addition to its main location in SoHo and the aforementioned Miami location, Lure Fishbar has opened another location in New York City and one in Chicago.

== Reception ==
Lure Fishbar was named one of the Best Seafood Restaurants in America by Tasting Table in 2022. It was also named one of the Best Seafood Restaurants in New York City by Eater in 2023. Gayot named it to its list of Best Seafood Restaurants in the New York Area for 2025. In 2025, The Infatuation ranked Lure Fishbar's lobster roll as the 12th-best lobster roll in New York City.

Lure Fishbar has also received positive reviews from publications such as New York Magazine and the New York Times.
