= Red's Eats =

Take-out restaurant in Wiscasset, Maine, US

Coordinates: 44°00′09″N 69°39′51″W

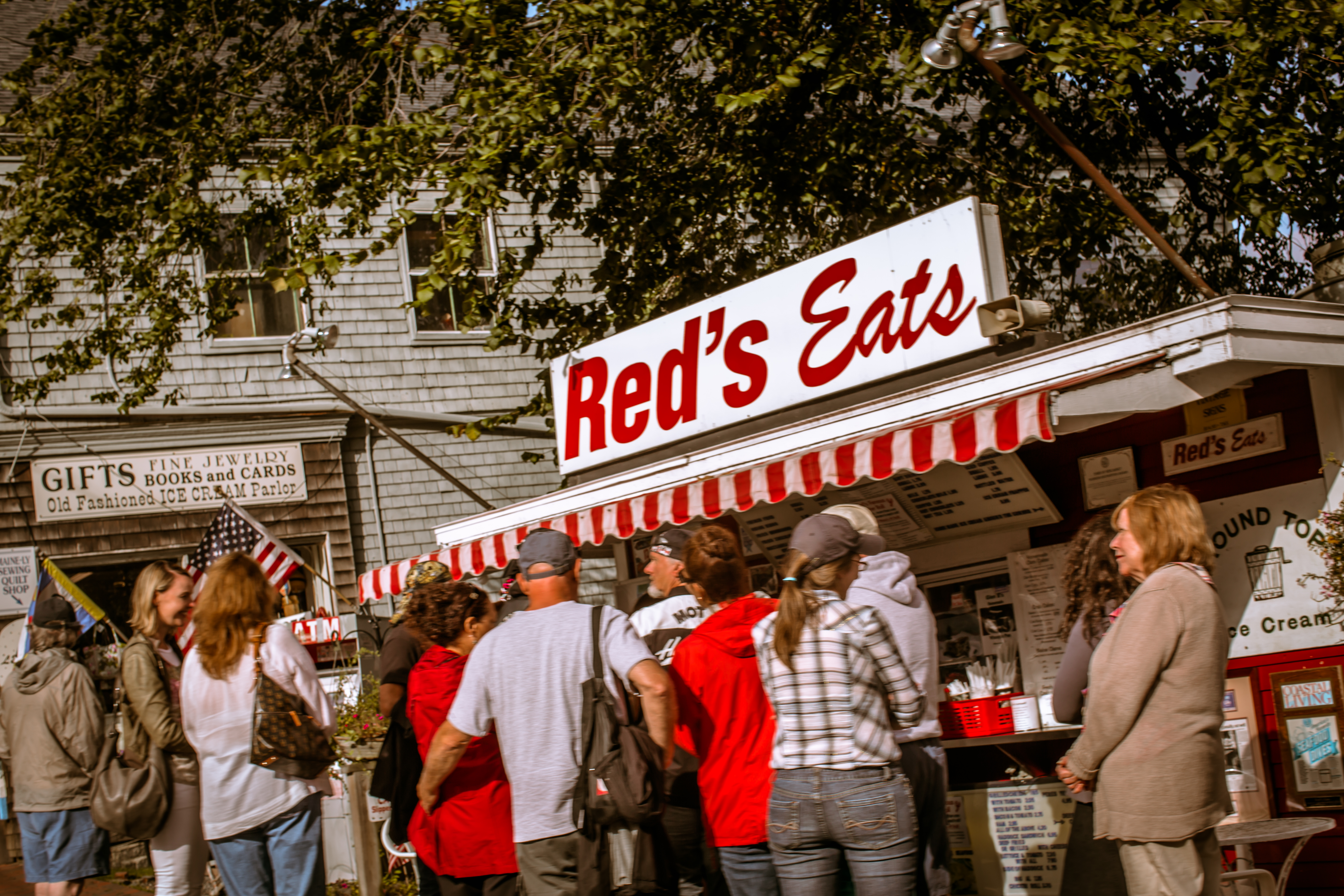
Red's Eats, on U.S. Route 1 in Wiscasset, Maine

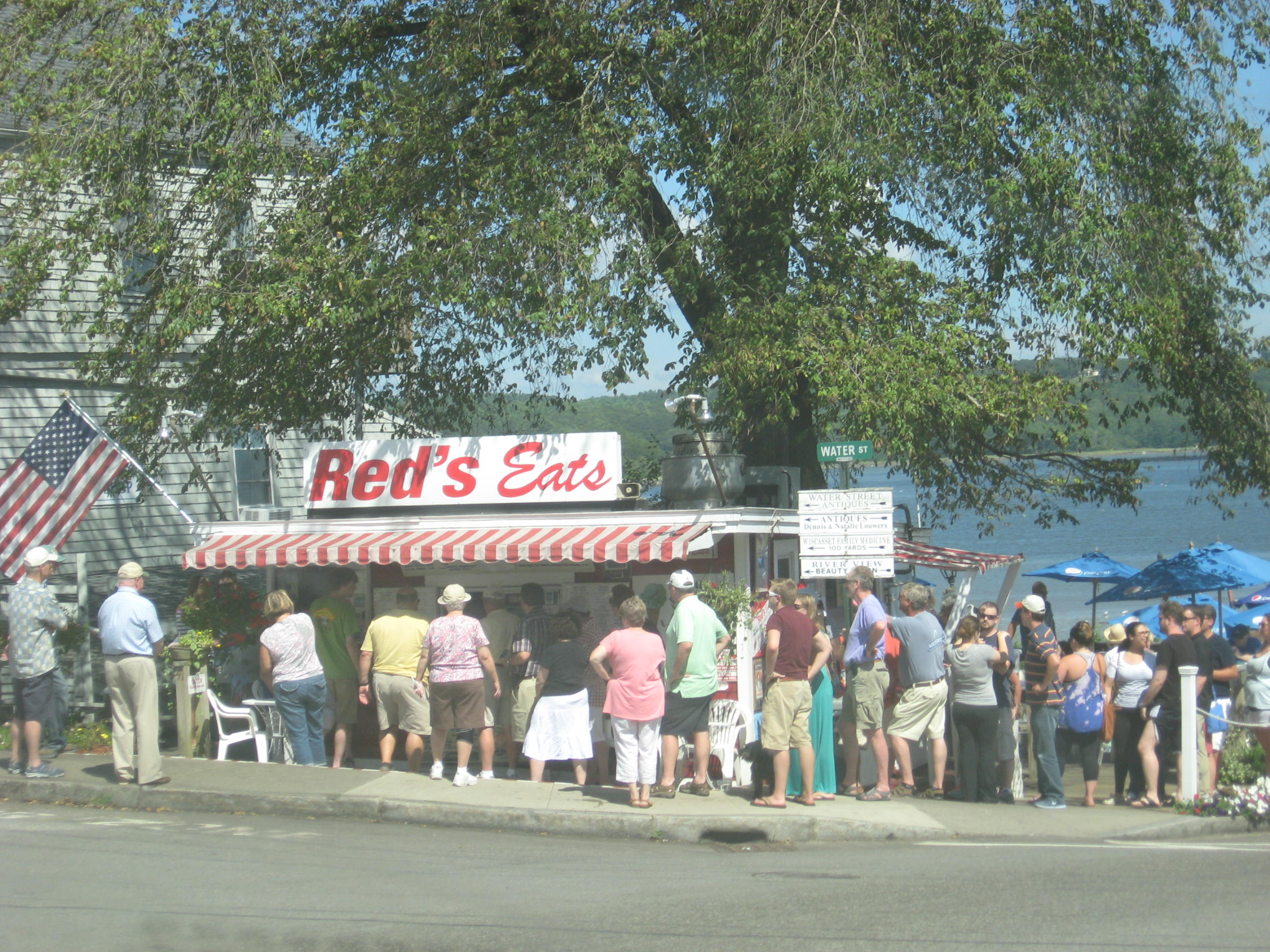
Long lines are common at Red's

Red's Eats is a take-out restaurant located in Wiscasset, Maine. It is one of the best-known and most-written-about restaurants in the state.

== History ==
Allan "Red" Gagnon has operated since 1938, originally in Boothbay, Maine. It moved to its present location at the intersection of Water Street and Main Street in Wiscasset in 1954. It is open from mid-April to mid-October. In addition to its signature lobster rolls, Red's serves fried clams, hamburgers, french fries, hot dogs, and chicken sandwiches. The lobster rolls were priced at $38.95 as of 2026. [2]

Red's building is an actual lobster shack; it has been described as being about the size of a minivan. There is no inside seating; long lines are common (with wait times of an hour or more), and traffic on nearby Route 1 often exceeds 25,000 cars a day in the summer.

The restaurant, situated at the western end of the Davey Bridge, is considered a midcoast Maine landmark. It has been profiled in numerous magazine and newspaper reviews, Internet reviews, and television features. One of the owners of the restaurant, Debbie Cronk, co-wrote a book with Virginia Wright called Red’s Eats: World’s Best Lobster Shack.

== Honors ==
- 1,000 Places to See in the USA and Canada Before You Die by Patricia Schultz
- 500 Things to Eat Before It’s Too Late by Michael and Jane Stern (USA Today)
- Best Lobster in Maine (Travel + Leisure)

== External links and further reading ==
- Debbie Cronk and Virginia Wright, Red's Eats: World's Best Lobster Shack, Down East Books (June 16, 2010), hardcover, 96 pages, ISBN 0892728574 ISBN 978-0892728572
