= Wiscasset Historic District =

Historic district in Maine, United States

- U.S. National Register of Historic Places
- U.S. Historic district
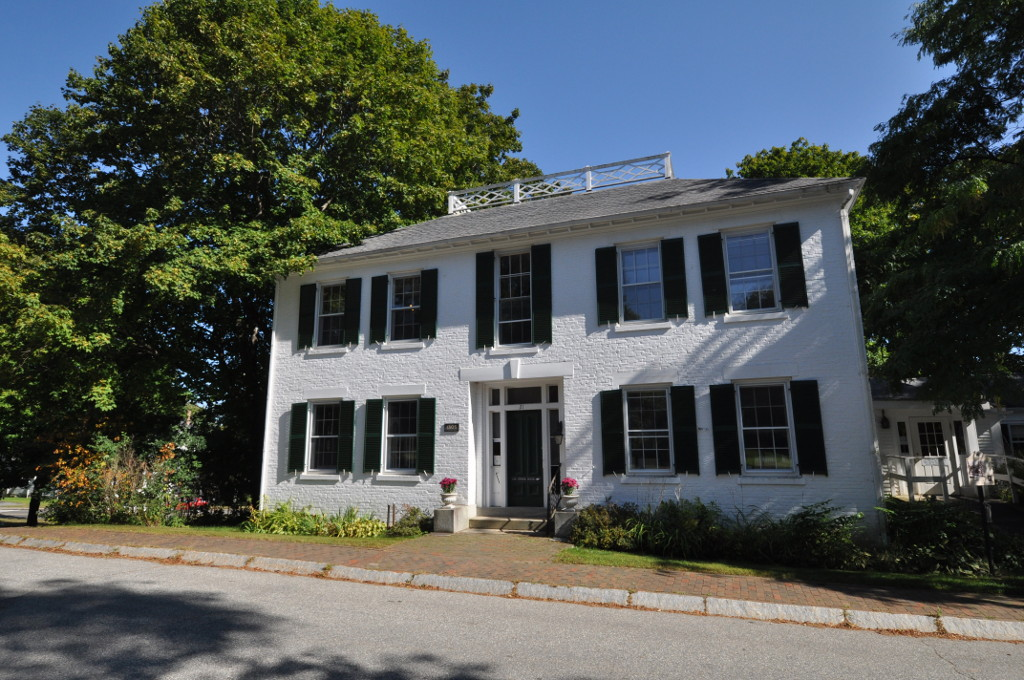
- The Wiscasset Public Library

- Location within Maine Location within the United States
- Location: Roughly Parker, Dresden, Bradford, Main, and Federal Sts., Wiscasset, Maine
- Coordinates: 44°0′20″N 69°40′4″W
- Area: 101 acres (41 ha)
- Architectural style: Greek Revival, Federal, Octagon
- NRHP reference No.: 73000242
- Added to NRHP: January 12, 1973

The Wiscasset Historic District is a 101-acre (41 ha) historic district that encompasses substantially all of the central village of Wiscasset, Maine. The district includes at least 22 contributing buildings and two other contributing sites, one being a cemetery whose oldest stone is from 1739. Located on the west bank of the Sheepscot River and settled in the 18th century, Wiscasset was a prominent harbor in Mid Coast Maine, and a major shipbuilding and merchant port, until the War of 1812 ended its prosperity. The village center includes fine examples of Federal period architecture, most built between about 1780 and 1820, including one National Historic Landmark, the Nickels-Sortwell House. The district was listed on the National Register of Historic Places in 1973.

== Description and history ==
The town of Wiscasset is located on the western bank of the Sheepscot River, at a wide point above the northern tip of Westport island, which the river passes on both sides en route to the Gulf of Maine. It is thus afforded with a deep and sheltered harbor area. Wiscasset was first settled by Europeans in the 1670s, but conflict with the local Native Americans (sometimes with French assistance) prevented significant permanent settlement until the 1760s. Incorporated as part of Pownalborough in 1760, it was incorporated as Wiscasset in 1794 when Pownalborough was split into Dresden, Alna, and Perkins. Wiscasset then also became the shire town of Lincoln County. It flourished as a shipbuilding and commercial center until the Embargo Act of 1807 damaged its economy, and the War of 1812 wrecked it. The town's economy has since been a shadow of that period's success, and development stalled, only sometimes punctuated by fires, which were mainly restricted to its waterfront areas.

During the height of its economic success, a significant amount of fairly high-style Federal architecture was built. Prominent examples are found along some of its residential streets, as well as United States Route 1, the main east-west route through the village, where the National Historic Landmark Nickels-Sortwell House stands. This house, built in 1805, is one of nation's finest examples of Federal architecture. Other prominent buildings include the public library, located in an 1805 brick mansion, and the former Wiscasset Academy building, built in 1807 and now housing an art gallery. The district also includes a few examples of later architecture, including the octagonal Capt. George Scott House on Federal Street. The Wiscasset Jail and Museum, built in 1809, is one of the state's oldest surviving jails, and is (like the Nickels-Sortwell House) a museum open to the public.

== Contributing resources ==
- Ancient Cemetery, earliest existing stone 1739 (photo 1)
- Judge Rice House, before 1766, on Route 1 (photo 2)
- Kingsbury House (1763), at Federal & Washington Streets, moved from site of Nickels-Sortwell House
- Tucker-Nash House, before 1784, Main & Pleasant Streets, moved in 1792 to current location
- Erskine-Marston House (1785), Main Street
- Hodge House (1787), Rt. #1 & Hodge Street, documented by HABS
- Lilac Cottage (Antique Shop) (before 1789), Washington Street
- Governor Smith House, 1792 (photo 3), High Street, documented by HABS
- The Elmes (1793), Pleasant & Bradbury Street. Built by Gen. Abiel Wood, whose last wife Sally Sayward Wood was Maine's first female novelist. Moved to present site by Wm. Elmes.
- Bradford House, 1794. Bradford Street (photo 4) Built by Alden Bradford, descendant of Gov. Bradford and second Congregational minister of Wiscasset, who later became Secretary of the Commonwealth of Massachusetts and wrote "History of Massachusetts"
- Frances Cook House (1795), Main & Pleasant Streets. Built for Francis Cook, first U.S. Customs collector (first in Wiscasset?) and a personal friend of George Washington
- Manasseh Smith House (1797), Main Street, believed to be first brick house in Wiscasset
- Moses Carlton House (1804–05), High Street (photo 5). Sold to Capt. Moses Carlton for 100 puncheons of rum.
- Damon House, also known as the "Pink House" (1805), Federal Street (photo 6). Owned by Harvard University, administered by Boston Athenaeum. One of five Federal houses in the area which were built by Wm. Stacey.
- Pumpkin House (1807), Fore & Fort Hill Streets
- Nickels-Sortwell House (1807), Main and Federal Street. Documented by HABS.
- Castle Tucker (1807–08), High & Lee Streets (photo 7). Has "unusual elliptical stairs. Double piazza and Victorian trim added by Capt. Richard Tucker in 1859."
- Wood-Foote House, also known as Abiel Wood House, (1811-1824), High Street. (photo 9) Three-story mansion with Palladian window and doorway.
- Blagdon-Emerson House (before 1819), Federal Street near Danforth. "Typical two-story 'mart and manse' where Charles E. Emerson published periodicals Littiputian (1881-91) and then the Sheepscot Echo."
- Samuel Page House (1837), Lee Street. Has "handcarved porch by Edbury Hatch, of Newcastle. A ship's figure-head carver added in the early 20th century." HABS documented.
- Clark-Wood House (1852), also known as "Musical Wonder House", High Street. Built as a double house, HABS-documented, was a museum in 1972

Other than houses:

- Cemetery
- Red Brick School, also known as Old Academy (1807), Hodge & Warren Streets. HABS-documented. An art gallery in 1972. Separately NRHP-listed.
- Wiscasset Jail and Museum, also known as Lincoln County Museum and Jail (1809-11 jail, 1837 or 1839 jailer's house), Federal Street (photo 8). HABS documented. Separately NRHP-listed.
- Old Powder House (1813), Churchill Street. Brick. HABS-documented
- Old Customhouse (1869–70), Water, Fore & Middle Streets. Separately NRHP-listed.
- Lincoln County Courthouse (1824) (photo 10)
- Capt. George Scott House (Octagon House) (1855), Federal Street (photo 11)
- Wewenock Building or Wawenock Block (1856), Main Street (Route 1) (photo 12)
- Wiscasset Public Library (1805), High Street. Was second brick house in Wiscasset, later was various banks, then county offices, then house, then library in 1929.

== Other ==
The Rutherford and Martha Ellis House, a Colonial Revival cottage built in 1939 in Atlanta, Georgia, was based on a Wiscasset cottage that was built in 1770.

== See also ==
- National Register of Historic Places listings in Lincoln County, Maine
