= United States Customhouse and Post Office (Wiscasset, Maine) =

- U.S. Customhouse (Old Customhouse) and Post Office
- U.S. National Register of Historic Places
- U.S. Historic district – Contributing property
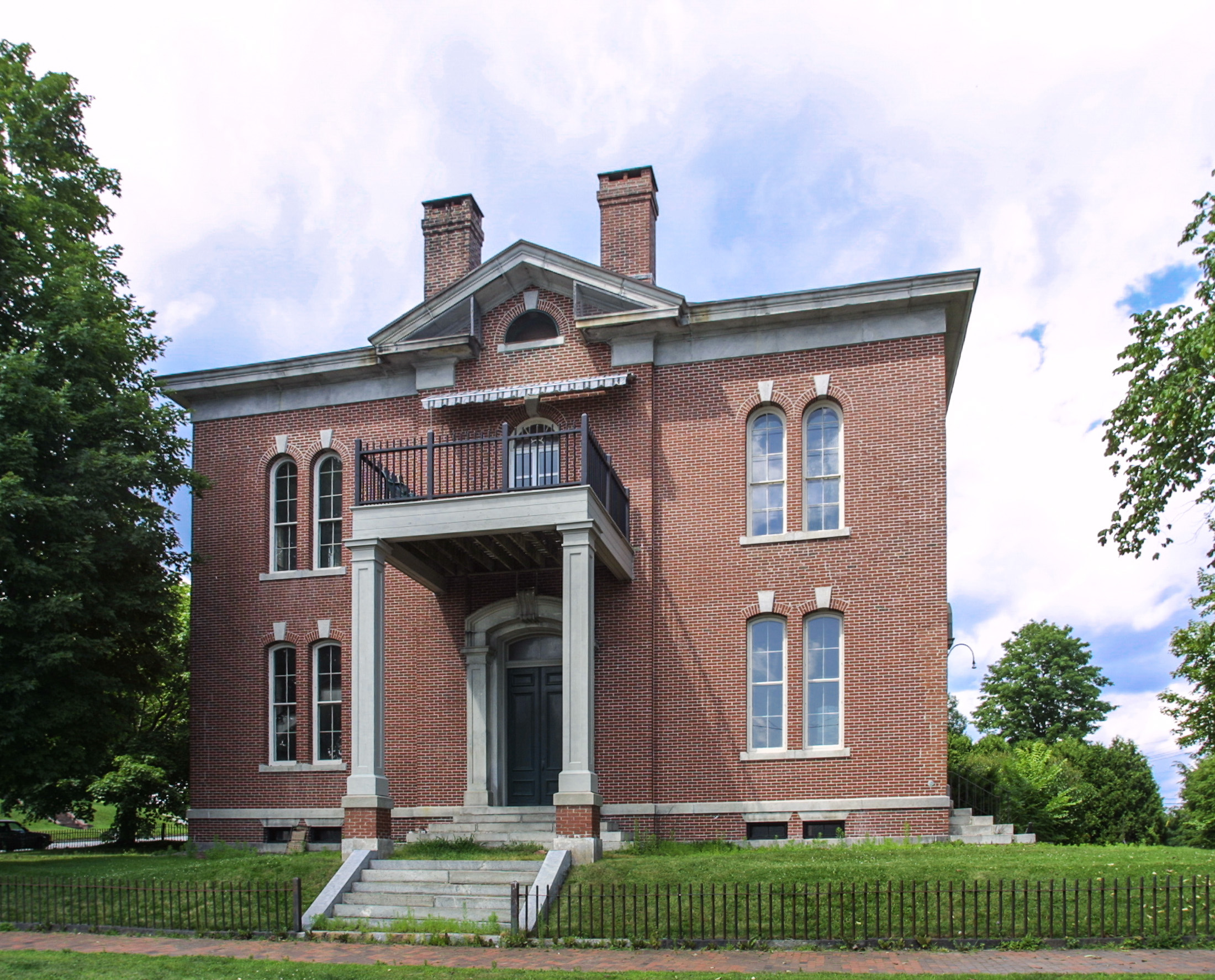

- Location within Maine Location within the United States
- Location: Water Street, Wiscasset, Maine
- Coordinates: 44°0′3″N 69°39′58″W
- Area: 0.5 acres (0.20 ha)
- Built: 1870
- Architect: Alfred B. Mullett
- Part of: Wiscasset Historic District (ID73000242)
- NRHP reference No.: 70000053

Significant dates
- Added to NRHP: August 25, 1970
- Designated CP: January 12, 1973

The United States Customhouse and Post Office, also known as the Old Customhouse, is a historic federal government building at Fore and Water Streets in Wiscasset, Maine. It was designed by Alfred B. Mullett and built in 1869–1870 by William Hogan of Bath, Maine. It was added to the National Register of Historic Places on August 25, 1970. It has been a private residence since purchased by Entrepreneur Jack Nelson and his wife Stacy in October 2013.

== Description and history ==
The former customhouse in Wiscasset stands adjacent to its historic waterfront area, at the northwest corner of Water and Fore Streets. It is a 2-1/2 story brick building, with a hip roof and granite foundation. Its south-facing front facade is three bays wide, the center one projecting slightly and topped by a low-pitch gable with a keystoned half-round window at its center. A porch shelters the center entrance, with square paneled posts rising by an entablature and flat roof with balcony rail. Windows on the ground floor consist of pairs set in segmented-arch openings, while those on the second floor, also paired, are set in round-arch openings. A granite entablature separates the brick wall from the projecting roof cornice.

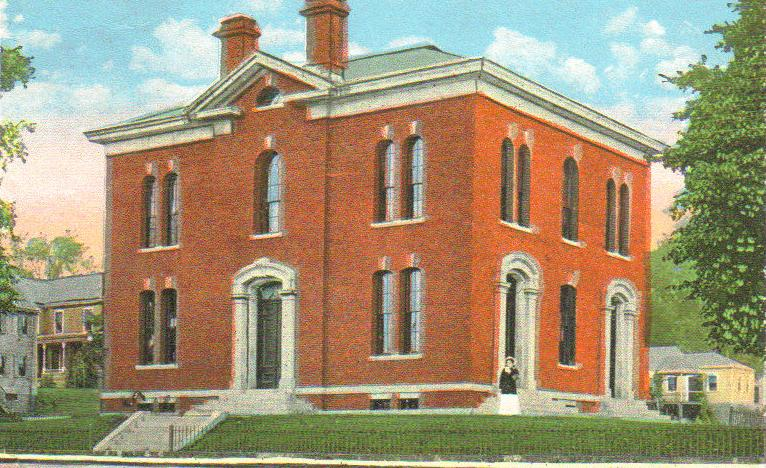
Postcard ca. 1920

Wiscasset's first customs office was opened in 1791, and was then located in a small building adjacent to the home of the collector, Francis Cook. This building was later moved to Bradford Street and converted to a private residence; it later burned down. Its next customhouse was built in the 1790s, and was destroyed in Wiscasset's 1866 fire. The present building was designed Alfred B. Mullett, the Supervising Architect of the United States Treasury Department, and was completed in 1870 by William Hogan, a local contractor. Hogan at first raided Fort Edgecomb for bricks, until the War Department put a halt to that activity, and also took stones from a family cemetery's enclosing wall.

The building at first housed both customs and post office facilities. Wiscasset ceased to be a port of entry in 1913, and parts of the building were occupied by other government offices until the 1960s, when the post office moved to new facilities. The building was then sold into private ownership, and has served a variety of commercial and residential purposes since.

== See also ==
- National Register of Historic Places listings in Lincoln County, Maine
- List of United States post offices
