= Marjoie Kilkelly =

American politician

Marjoie L. Kilkelly is an American politician from Maine. Kilkelly, a Democrat from Wiscasset, served from 1986 to 2002 in the Maine Legislature. Kilkelly was first elected to the Maine House of Representatives in November 1986. Re-elected every two years until 1994, Kilkelly won a seat in the Maine Senate. She served in the Senate until 2002.

Kilkelly was born in Bath, Maine. She earned both a B.S. and M.S. from New Hampshire College (now Southern New Hampshire University). Prior to serving in the Legislature, Kilkelly served on the Wiscasset Board of Selectmen.
