= Wiscasset Jail and Museum =

- U.S. National Register of Historic Places
- U.S. Historic district – Contributing property
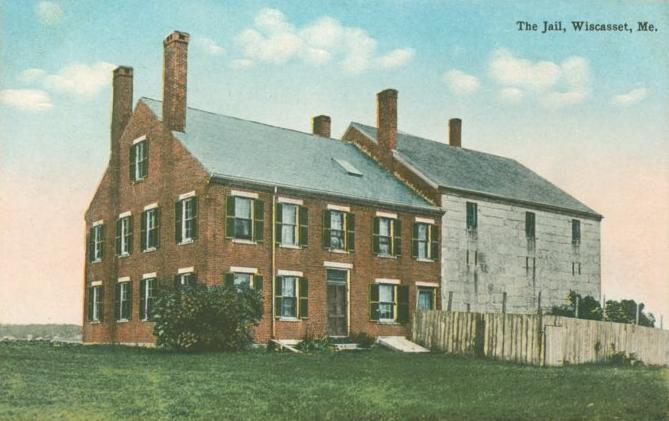

- Location within Maine Location within the United States
- Interactive map showing the location of Wiscasset Jail and Museum
- Location: 133 Federal St. (ME 218), Wiscasset, Maine
- Coordinates: 44°0′38″N 69°39′44″W
- Area: 5 acres (2.0 ha)
- Built: 1809
- Part of: Wiscasset Historic District (ID73000242)
- NRHP reference No.: 70000054

Significant dates
- Added to NRHP: January 26, 1970
- Designated CP: January 12, 1973

The Wiscasset Jail and Museum is a historic jail on at 133 Federal Street (Maine State Route 218) in Wiscasset, Maine. Built in 1811, it is one Maine's oldest surviving jail buildings, serving as the state's first penitentiary between 1820 and 1824. It is now a museum operated by the Lincoln County Historical Society as the 1811 Lincoln County Museum and Old Jail. It was listed on the National Register of Historic Places in 1970.

== Description and history ==
The former Wiscasset Jail is located north of Wiscasset's village center, on the east side of Federal Street, overlooking the Sheepscot River. The building has two distinct sections, one for the jail and the other for the keeper's residence. The portion housing the cells is built out of granite and is three stories in height. The interior consists of a central hall on each floor providing access to cells lining the long walls; the interior walls and floors are also granite. Eleven of the twelve cells have heavily barred window openings; the twelfth, which was used for solitary confinement, has no window. The third floor housed "apartments" used as debtor's cells and a work room. The keeper's quarters, attached to one of the gabled short walls, are a two-story brick structure, with a five bay facade and central entrance typical of Federal period architecture.

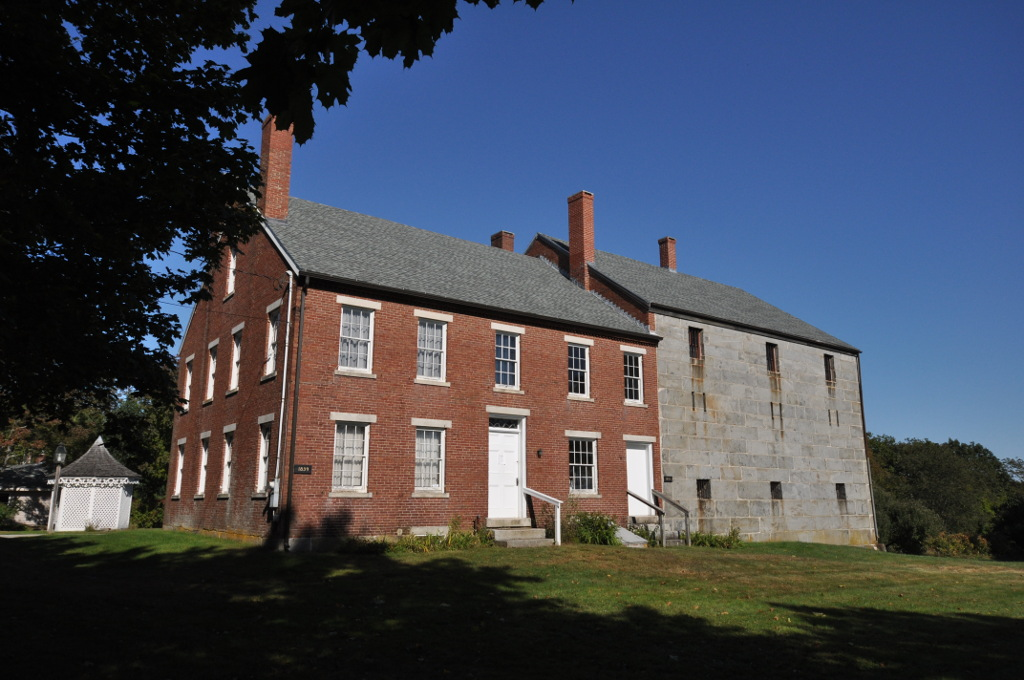
The old jail in 2014

Lincoln County was established in 1760, and had two different jails for the short-term retention of prisoners. The present building was authorized by the county in 1807, and construction lasted from 1809 to 1811. The original keeper's house was destroyed by fire, and the present brick house was built in 1839. It was until 1824 the only substantial place of incarceration in what was first the District of Maine of Massachusetts, and after 1820 the state of Maine. It remained in active use until 1953, and was sold to the Lincoln County Historical Society the following year. It has served as the society's headquarters and as a museum property since then.

== See also ==
- National Register of Historic Places listings in Lincoln County, Maine
