= Joseph Sewall Smith =

American Medal of Honor recipient (1836–1919)

Joseph S. Smith
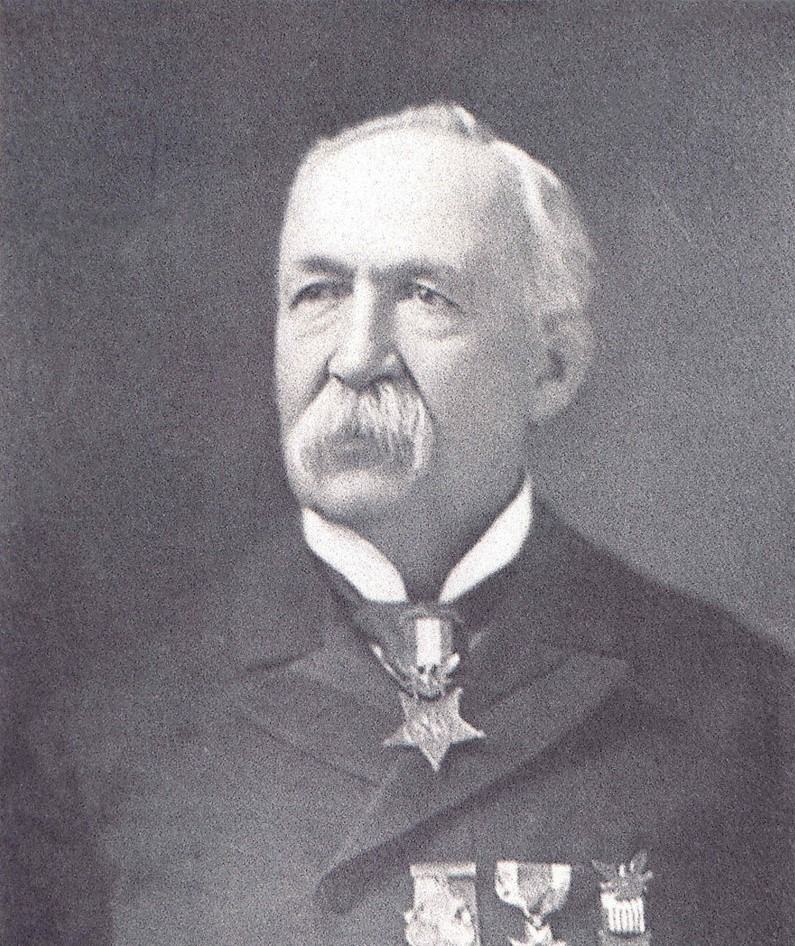
- Born: 27 November 1836; Wiscasset, Maine, US
- Died: 25 January 1919 (aged 82); Hampton, Virginia, US
- Burial place: Arlington National Cemetery
- Military career
- Allegiance: United States
- Branch: Union Army
- Service years: 1861–1865
- Rank: Lieutenant Colonel; Brevet Brigadier General
- Unit: 3rd Maine Volunteer Infantry Regiment
- Conflicts: American Civil War
- Awards: Medal of Honor

Joseph Sewall Smith (27 November 1836 – 25 January 1919) was a soldier in the Union Army during the American Civil War, advancing from private to lieutenant colonel. He was brevetted brigadier general of volunteers when released from active duty in July 1865 and later awarded the Medal of Honor in May 1892 for his actions while leading part of a brigade at the October 1864 Battle of Boydton Plank Road in Virginia.

== Biography ==
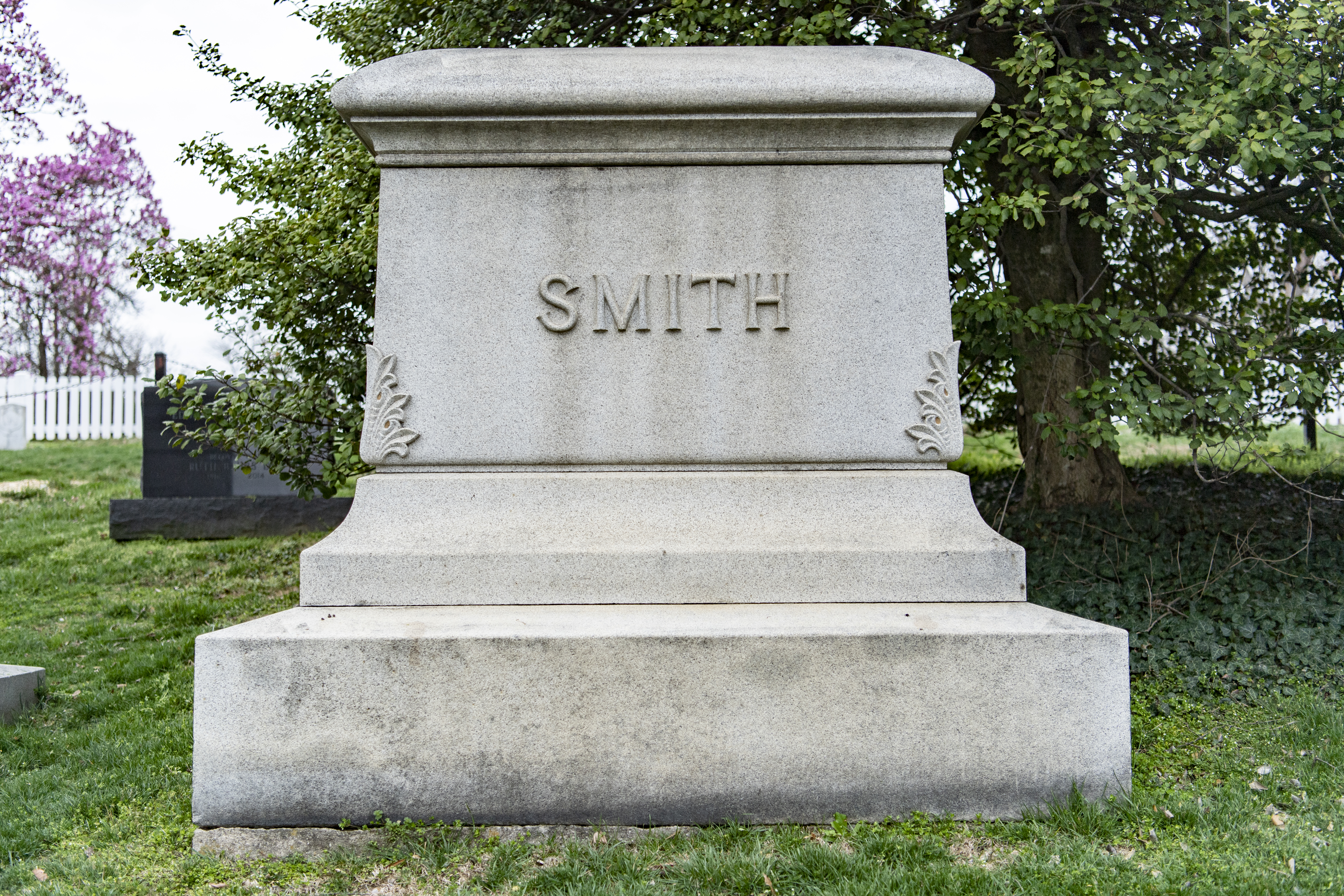
Grave at Arlington National Cemetery

Smith was born in Wiscasset, Maine, one of six children of Jacob Smith Jr. and Julia A. (Lambard) Smith. His older sister Julia Augusta Lambard Smith was married to Union Army Brigadier General Charles Davis Jameson. On 4 June 1861, Smith enlisted as a private in the newly formed 3rd Maine Volunteer Infantry Regiment. That same day, he was promoted to quartermaster sergeant. In August 1861, Smith was commissioned as a first lieutenant.

During the Civil War, Smith served primarily in the Commissary of Subsistence. In November 1861, he was promoted to captain. In April 1862, Smith was transferred to the staff of the Army of the Potomac. In June 1862, he was assigned to II Corps. In January 1863, Smith was promoted to lieutenant colonel.

On 27 October 1864, Smith was assigned to lead part of a brigade near Hatcher's Run in Dinwiddie County, Virginia. During the ensuing battle, he led a charge which saved two artillery pieces from rebel capture. Later that same day, he was brevetted colonel of volunteers for his gallant and distinguished service during the engagement and also during the August 1864 Second Battle of Ream's Station. Mustered out on 11 July 1865, he was brevetted brigadier general for his faithful and meritorious service.

After the war, Smith settled in Bangor, Maine. He married Agnes E. Clark (3 January 1844 – 17 August 1910) in 1866. They had two sons and a daughter, but their first son died at the age of two.

Smith worked as a merchant and as a U.S. Collector of Customs in Bangor. He also served on the board of managers for the National Home for Disabled Volunteer Soldiers and was an honorary staff member of the Ancient and Honorable Artillery Company of Massachusetts. After his wife's death from breast cancer, Smith moved to Hampton, Virginia, where he served as governor of the National Soldiers' Home from 1915 to 1918.

Near the end of his life, Smith lived in the Hotel Chamberlin at Fort Monroe with his daughter. He died from brain cancer at the Dixie Hospital in Hampton and was interred beside his wife and toddler son at Arlington National Cemetery on 27 January 1919.

== Medal of Honor citation ==
Led a part of a brigade, saved two pieces of artillery, captured a flag, and secured a number of prisoners.
