= Stephen Parsons House =

Historic house in Maine, United States

- U.S. National Register of Historic Places
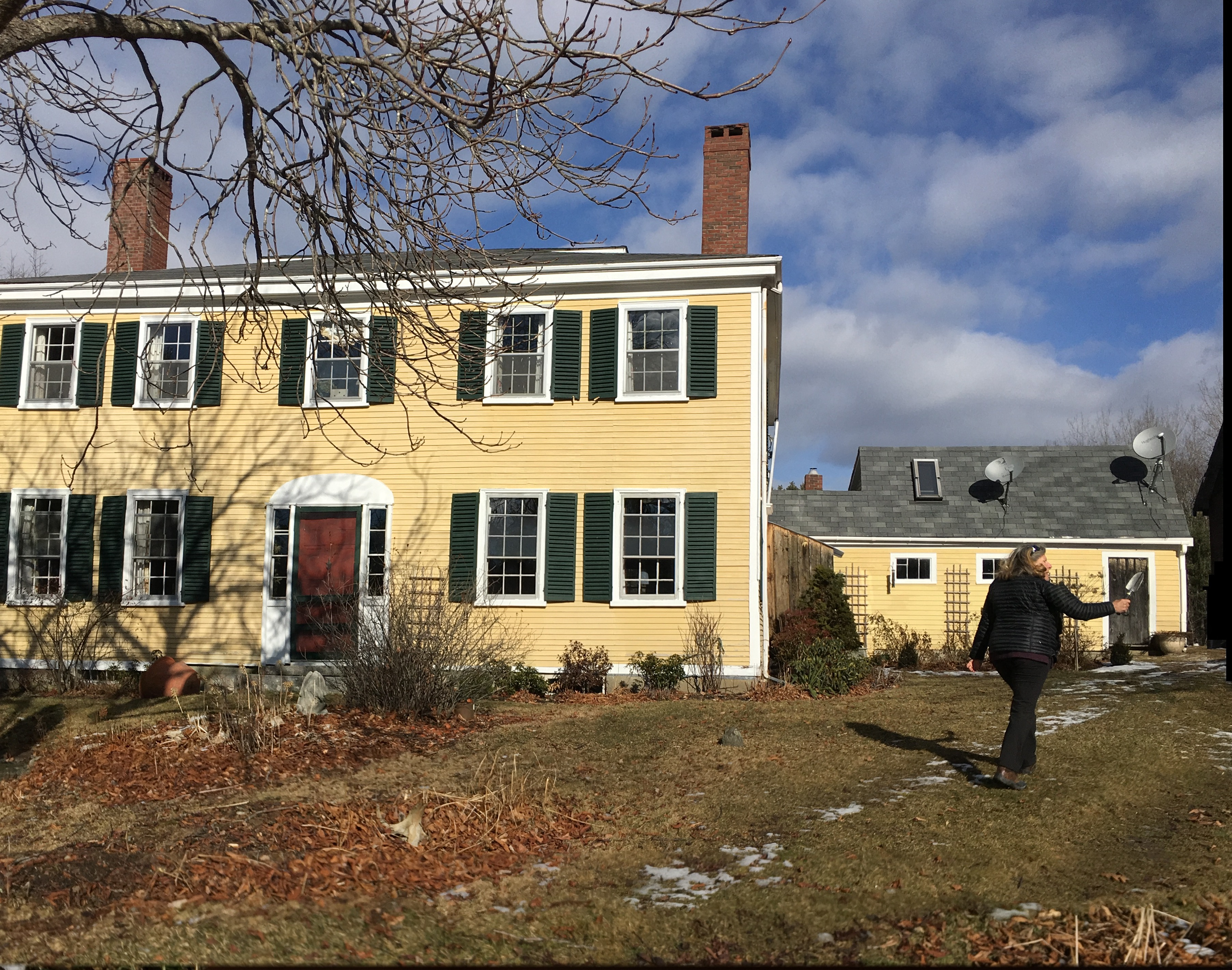

- Location within Maine Location within the United States
- Location: Old Mill Rd. Edgecomb, Maine
- Coordinates: 43°56′55″N 69°38′38″W
- Area: 0.5 acres (0.20 ha)
- Built: 1806
- Architect: Parsons, Stephen
- Architectural style: Federal
- NRHP reference No.: 83003648
- Added to NRHP: October 6, 1983

The Stephen Parsons House is a historic house on Old Mill Road in Edgecomb, Maine. Built in 1806 by a prominent local businessman and politician, it is a fine local example of Federal period architecture. Its interior includes extensive decorative stencilwork in the main hall. It was listed on the National Register of Historic Places in 1983.

== Description and history ==
The Stephen Parsons House is located in a rural setting, at the end of Old Mill Road southwest of the village center of Edgecomb. The house is oriented facing south, with Parsons Creek just to the west. It is a 2 1/2-story wood-frame structure, with a hip roof, two interior chimneys, and clapboard siding. The main facade is five bays wide, with a center entrance flanked by sidelight windows and topped by a semi-oval Federal period fan. The interior follows a central hall plan, with the main hall (on both floors) extensively decorated with ivy-patterned stencil work. Floors throughout are original wide pine, and the main parlor features a coved ceiling and recessed bookcases whose woodwork matches the interior window trim.

Stephen Parsons moved to Edgecomb in 1801 and quickly established himself as a successful businessman and community leader. He produced the first survey of the town, was its first postmaster and ran the general store. He built this house in 1806 and operated a tidally powered grist mill on Parsons Creek. When Maine achieved statehood in 1820, he was elected to its inaugural Senate. He was married to the daughter of Benjamin Randall, founder of the Free Will Baptist group.

== See also ==
- National Register of Historic Places listings in Lincoln County, Maine
