= Capt. George Scott House =

Historic house in Maine, United States

- U.S. National Register of Historic Places
- U.S. Historic district – Contributing property
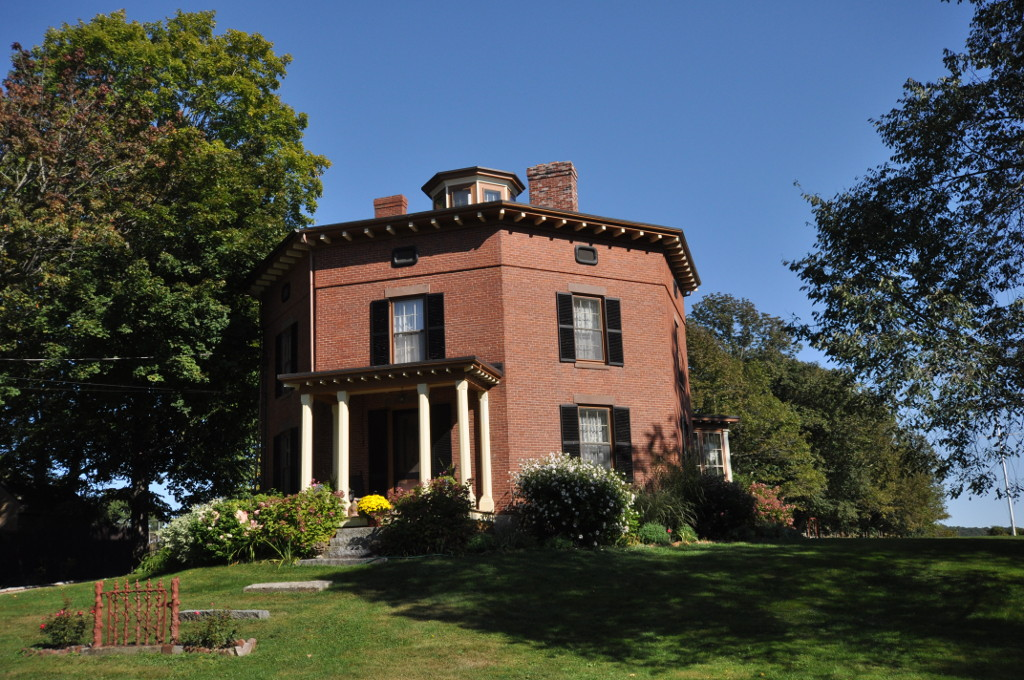

- Location within Maine Location within the United States
- Interactive map showing the location of Capt. George Scott House
- Location: Federal St., Wiscasset, Maine
- Coordinates: 44°0′26″N 69°39′48.5″W
- Built: 1855
- Architectural style: Octagon Mode
- Part of: Wiscasset Historic District (ID73000242)
- NRHP reference No.: 72000104

Significant dates
- Added to NRHP: February 23, 1972
- Designated CP: January 12, 1973

The Capt. George Scott House, also known locally as the Octagon House and the Collar Box House, is an historic octagon house on Federal Street in Wiscasset, Maine. Built in 1855, it was added to the National Register of Historic Places on February 23, 1972.

== Description and history ==
The Scott House stands on the east side of Federal Street, overlooking the Sheepscot River to the east, a short way north of the center of Wiscasset. It is a 2 1/2-story masonry structure, built out of brick with sandstone trim. A single wood-frame ell extends to the rear of the house, toward the river, where it is joined to a barn that appears to be 5/8 of an octagon. The main block is covered by an eight-sided roof with an octagonal cupola at its center, with extended eaves adorned with modillions. The main entrance faces the street, and is sheltered by a porch supported by four chamfered square posts and covered by a modillioned roof. Windows are set in rectangular openings, with small single-pane windows in the upper half-story that have rounded corners. The interior retains many original features, and remnants of others, such as a part of a dumbwaiter used to bring food from the original basement kitchen to the dining room.

The house was built in 1855, and was inspired by the work of Orson Squire Fowler, who promoted the design and construction of octagon houses, resulting in a construction fad in the 1850s and 1860s. It was built for George Scott, a Wiscasset native and successful ship's captain. A later resident was Edith Augusta Sawyer, an author of children's books.

== See also ==
- National Register of Historic Places listings in Lincoln County, Maine
- List of octagon houses
