= Davey Bridge =

Bridge in Wiscasset, Maine, U.S.

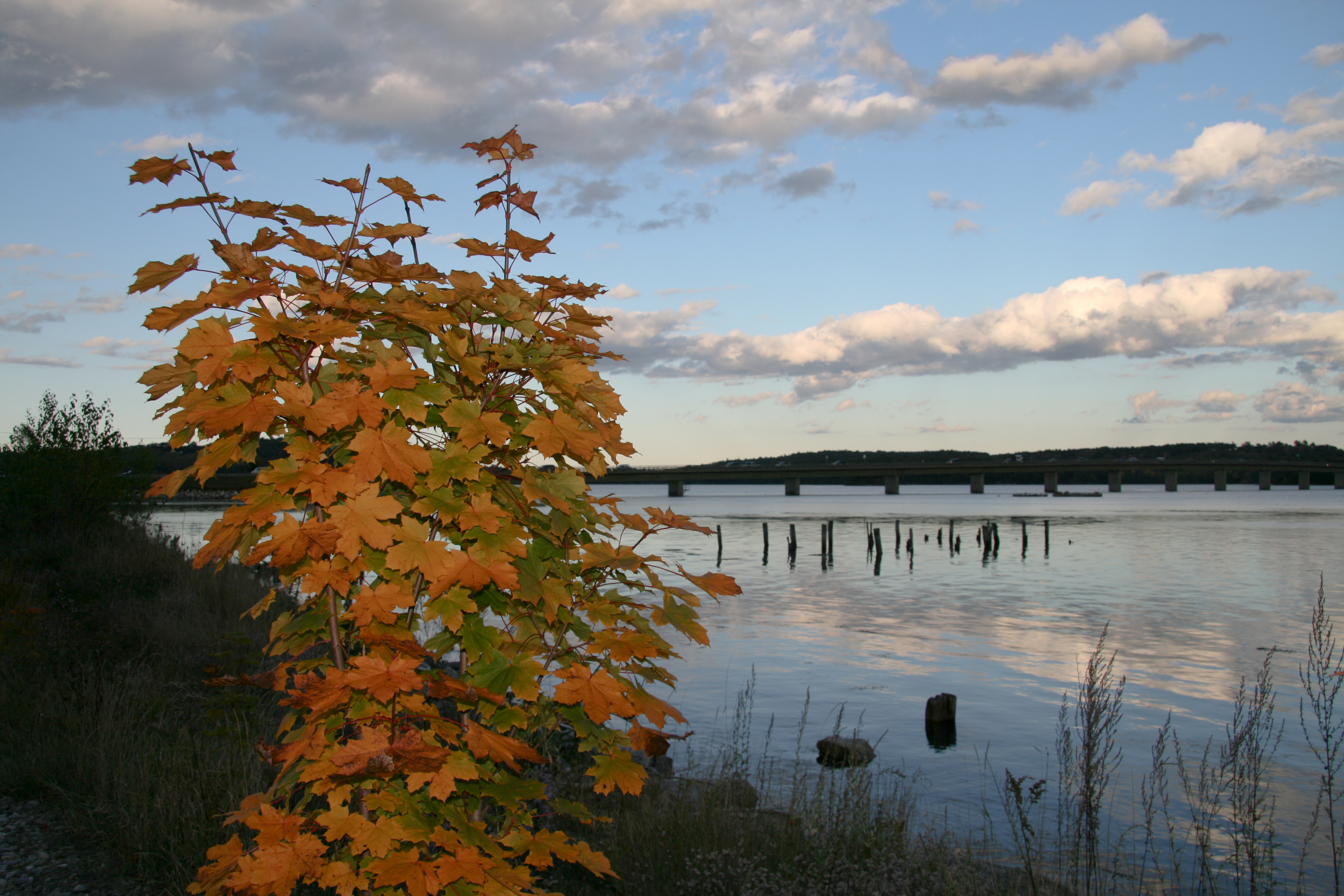
- Viewed from the south
- Coordinates: 44.000942°N 69.658331°W
- Carries: U.S. Route 1
- Crosses: Sheepscot River
- Locale: Wiscasset, Maine, U.S.
- Other name: Wiscasset Bridge
- Named for: Donald E. Davey

Characteristics
- Design: Concrete
- Total length: 2,719 feet (829 m)
- Width: 44.7 feet (14 m)
- Height: 20 feet (6 m)
- No. of spans: 23

History
- Architect: FIGG Bridge Group
- Constructed by: Shoals Construction
- Opened: June 15, 1983 (43 years ago)

Location
- Interactive map of Davey Bridge

Davey Bridge (also known as the Wiscasset Bridge), in Wiscasset, Maine, United States, spans the Sheepscot River. It carries the traffic of U.S. Route 1 between Wiscasset and Edgecomb. It was completed in 1983, after a two-year construction, at a cost of over $8.5 million. The bridge was designed by FIGG Bridge Group, of Tallahassee, Florida, who also designed the Penobscot Narrows Bridge. Shoals Construction, of Eliot, Maine, constructed it.

The bridge, the first of its kind in New England, is 2,719 feet (829 m) long, 44.7 feet (13.6 m) wide and constructed of 318 steel-reinforced concrete segments joined by steel cables. The bridge opened on June 15, 1983, was dedicated on September 28, 1986, and is named for Donald E. Davey, a detective sergeant in the Lincoln County Sheriff's department who was killed, aged 37, in the line of duty two years prior.

The bridge is located around 1.2 miles (1.9 km) downstream of the Wiscasset Railway Bridge, which was built in 1916.
