= Cross Island Chapel =

Smallest church in the world

- 43°5′58.1424″N 75°38′14.37″W
- Location: Oneida, New York
- Country: United States
- Denomination: Non-denominational

Architecture
- Architect: Chandler Mason
- Completed: 1989

Specifications
- Capacity: 5
- Length: 6 feet (1.8 metres)
- Width: 3 feet (0.91 metres)

Cross Island Chapel is a non-denominational church located on a dock on Mason's Pond in Oneida, New York.

== Description ==
The church, erected in 1989, is notable for its small size, measuring just four feet three inches (1.30 meters) by six feet nine inches (2.06 meters), and has been called "The Smallest Church in the World". It obtained this title in July 1990, when its floor area under-measured the longtime Guinness Record holder, Union Church in Wiscasset, Maine.
