= Red Brick School (Wiscasset, Maine) =

- U.S. National Register of Historic Places
- U.S. Historic district – Contributing property
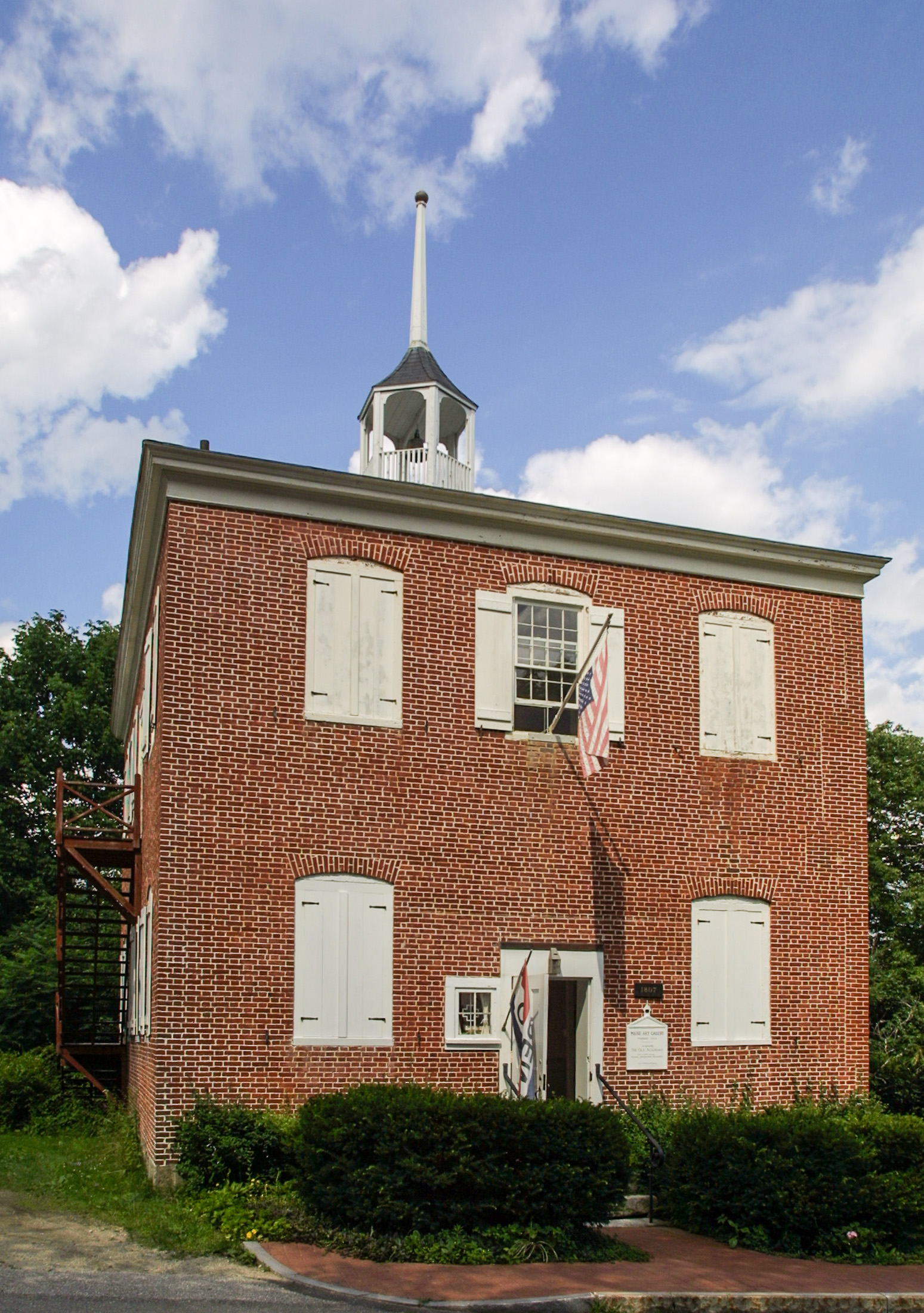
- Red Brick Schoolhouse in 2003

- Location within Maine Location within the United States
- Location: Warren St, Wiscasset, Maine
- Coordinates: 44°0′19″N 69°40′0″W
- Built: 1807; 219 years ago
- Part of: Wiscasset Historic District (ID73000242)
- NRHP reference No.: 70000089

Significant dates
- Added to NRHP: October 6, 1970
- Designated CP: January 12, 1973

The Red Brick School is an historic school building on Warren Street in Wiscasset, Maine, United States. Built in 1807 as a subscription-funded secondary school, it served in that role until 1923. It was added to the National Register of Historic Places listings in October 1970. It now houses an art gallery.

== Description and history ==
The Red Brick School stands in a residential area northwest of Wiscasset's small commercial center, at the northeast corner of Warren and Hodge Streets. It is a two-story masonry structure, with brick walls, a hip roof topped by a cupola, and a foundation of fieldstone capped by granite slabs. The south-facing front wall is laid in Flemish bond, while the sides and rear are laid in common bond. The front is three bays wide, with windows set in segmented-arch openings topped by brick headers, and a center entrance set in a simple rectangular opening with a small square window to the left. The interior has retained some original finishes despite undergoing alterations for different uses in the 20th century.

The area that is now Wiscasset was settled in the 17th century, and was part of the Massachusetts Bay Colony, which mandated education for its inhabitants. The earliest known classes were held in the meeting house of Pownalborough, which Wiscasset was part of, and then in a district school house built in 1792. Since the district school only provided primary education, the present school building was constructed in 1807 by private subscription to provide secondary education. This private school operated until 1848, and another opened in the building in 1854, running until 1923. The building thereafter housed a local American Legion chapter, and served as a local polling place, before being converted into a studio and gallery space in 1958.

== See also ==
- Education in Maine
- National Register of Historic Places listings in Lincoln County, Maine
