= Nickels-Sortwell House =

Historic house in Maine, United States

- U.S. National Register of Historic Places
- U.S. National Historic Landmark
- U.S. Historic district – Contributing property
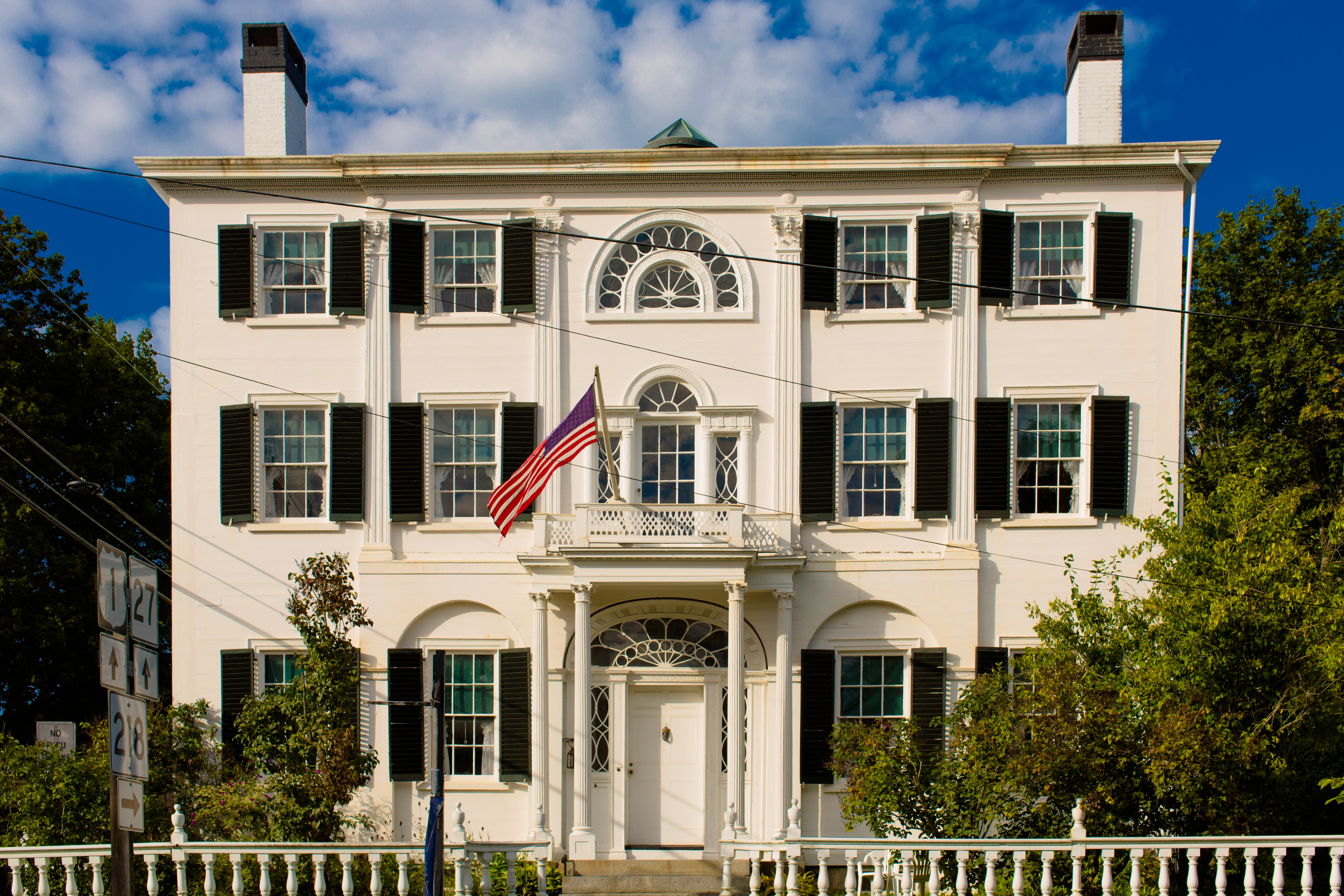
- Front of the house

- Location within Maine Location within the United States
- Location: 121 Main St. (corner of Federal); Wiscasset, Maine
- Coordinates: 44.00295°N 69.66565°W
- Area: less than one acre
- Built: 1807
- Architectural style: Federal
- Part of: Wiscasset Historic District (ID73000242)
- NRHP reference No.: 70000078

Significant dates
- Added to NRHP: December 30, 1970
- Designated NHL: December 30, 1970
- Designated CP: January 12, 1973

The Nickels-Sortwell House is a historic house museum at 121 Main Street in Wiscasset, Maine, United States. Built in 1807 by a wealthy ship's captain, the house was designated a National Historic Landmark in 1970 as an exceptionally high-quality example of the Federal style of architecture. After serving as a hotel for much of the 19th century, the house returned to private hands in 1900. It was given to Historic New England in 1958, which gives tours of the house between May and October.

== Description ==
The Nickels-Sortwell House is set facing south on a sideways-sloping lot on the north side of Main Street (U.S. Route 1) in the center of Wiscasset. It is a three-story wood-frame structure, five bays wide and 83 feet (25 m) deep, the length including a rear ell. It has a low-pitch hip roof and is set on a granite foundation. The front facade is finished in flushboard, while the remainder of the house is clapboarded. On the first floor, the middle three bays are outlined by slightly projecting arches, the central bay (where the entrance is) being slightly wider. The entry consists of a single door, flanked by pilasters and sidelight windows embellished with oval tracery, and topped by a semi-elliptical fanlight with similar tracery. The entry is sheltered by a portico supported by four Corinthian columns, with a latticework balustrade on top.

Above the central projecting arches, four fluted Corinthian pilasters rise to the roof level. The fenestration of the bays other than the central one is uniform; there is a Palladian window at the second level in the center, and a half-round window at the third level, exhibiting tracery similar to that found in the entry windows.

The interior of the house has a modified central-hall plan, with the central hall divided by a partition into a front public hall and a rear service hall, which is continued to the service rooms in the rear ell. The front hall is semi-oval in shape, and is divided crosswise by an arch. Doorways in the front half lead left and right into large parlor spaces, and a free-standing spiral staircase rises in the center. The interior retains much of its original woodwork, including window seats and recessed inside shutters for the windows.

== History ==
The house was built in 1807 by Captain William Nickels, a ship owner and trader. The style and age of the building reflect "a period when shipbuilding and the maritime trade brought prosperity and sophisticated tastes to this riverside community." Nickels, whose earlier success had enabled him to build such a lavish house, was financially ruined by the Embargo of 1807 and the War of 1812, and died in 1815. From 1820 to 1900 the house was operated as a hotel. During this time a number of alterations were made to the interior, including subdividing some of its bedrooms.

The house was purchased in 1899 by Alvin F. Sortwell of Cambridge, Massachusetts, and redecorated by his family in the then-fashionable Colonial Revival style. The solarium in the northeast corner was added by the Sortwells, as was the present entry portico, which replaced a broader porch added during the hotel period. The Sortwells also repurchased a parcel to the rear of the house that had been subdivided from the Nickels holdings, and built a carriage house on it. The garden in between was designed by Charles Eliot II of the Olmsted Brothers landscape design firm. Frances Sortwell, the daughter of Alvin and Gertrude Sortwell, bequeathed the property to the Society for the Preservation of New England Antiquities (now Historic New England) in 1958.

The property was designated a National Historic Landmark and listed on the National Register of Historic Places in 1970, and is a contributing property to the Wiscasset Historic District, listed in 1973. It is open seasonally June 1 - October 15 for tours; admission is charged, except for members of Historic New England. Part of the house is now also available as a short-term vacation rental.

== See also ==
- List of National Historic Landmarks in Maine
- National Register of Historic Places listings in Lincoln County, Maine
