= Castle Tucker =

Victorian mansion in Wiscasset, Maine, US

Coordinates: 44°00′07″N 69°40′11″W

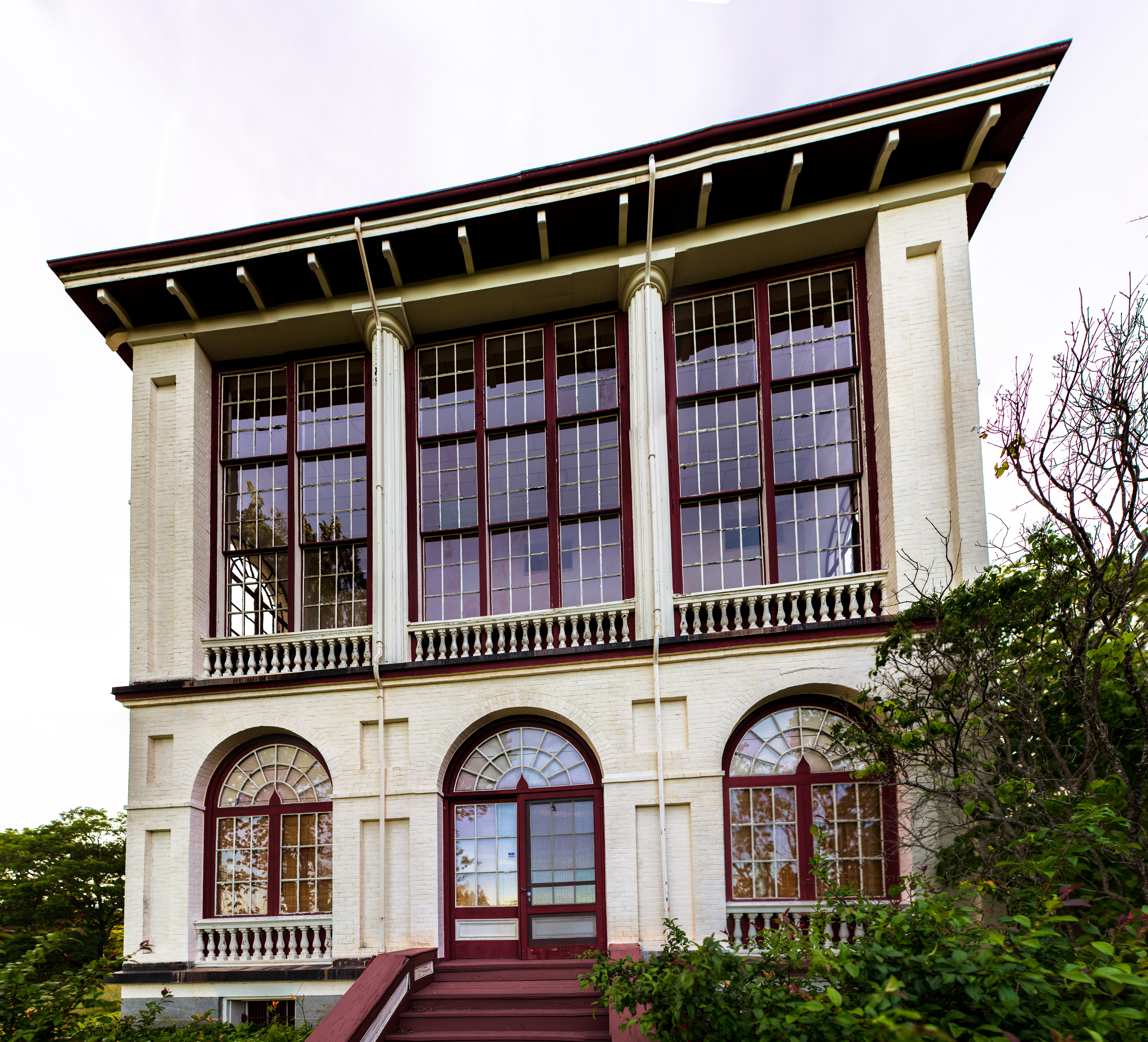
- Castle Tucker, Wiscasset, Maine.

General information
- Type: Victorian Mansion
- Location: Wiscasset, Maine
- Current tenants: Museum
- Completed: 1807
- Owner: Historic New England

Castle Tucker is a historic mansion in Wiscasset, Maine, United States. It is owned by Historic New England and is open to visitors Friday – Sunday, June 15 – October 15.

== History ==
Judge Silas Lee built this 1807 Regency-style mansion at the peak of Wiscasset's prosperity, when the town was the busiest port east of Boston. Lee's death in 1814, combined with the cumulative financial impact of Jefferson's Embargo of 1807, forced his widow to sell it. The house passed through a succession of hands until 1858, when Captain Richard H. Tucker, Jr. scion of a Wiscasset shipping family, bought the property. Captain Tucker, his young wife, Mollie and their new baby moved into the house in November 1858. The Tuckers updated the interiors and added a new Italianate entrance to the Lee Street side of the house. In 1859, he added a dramatic two-story porch to what had been the front of the house facing the Sheepscot River.

The couple raised five children here. Captain Tucker oversaw various business ventures, including wharves and an iron foundry just below the house. However, by the 1880s, expenses had far exceeded income. Mollie began accepting boarders in the summers to help cover the expenses. She and their youngest daughter, Jane, also turned to the sale of home-baked goods, hand-painted china and raising squab for local restaurants to raise much needed cash.

After Captain Tucker's death, Jane returned to live in the house full-time with Mollie. The women helped preserve the house until Mollie's death in 1922 and Jane's death in 1964. Her niece, Jane Standen Tucker, moved to Wiscasset from California to preserve the house and all its contents, making very few changes to the decorating schemes. Their dedication preserved Castle Tucker as it was in the late 19th and early 20th century.

The house is now owned by Historic New England and is open to visitors Wednesday - Sunday, June 1 – October 15.

A panoramic image looking out from Castle Tucker, Wiscasset, Maine, USA
