= Union Church (Wiscasset, Maine) =

Once considered the smallest church in the world

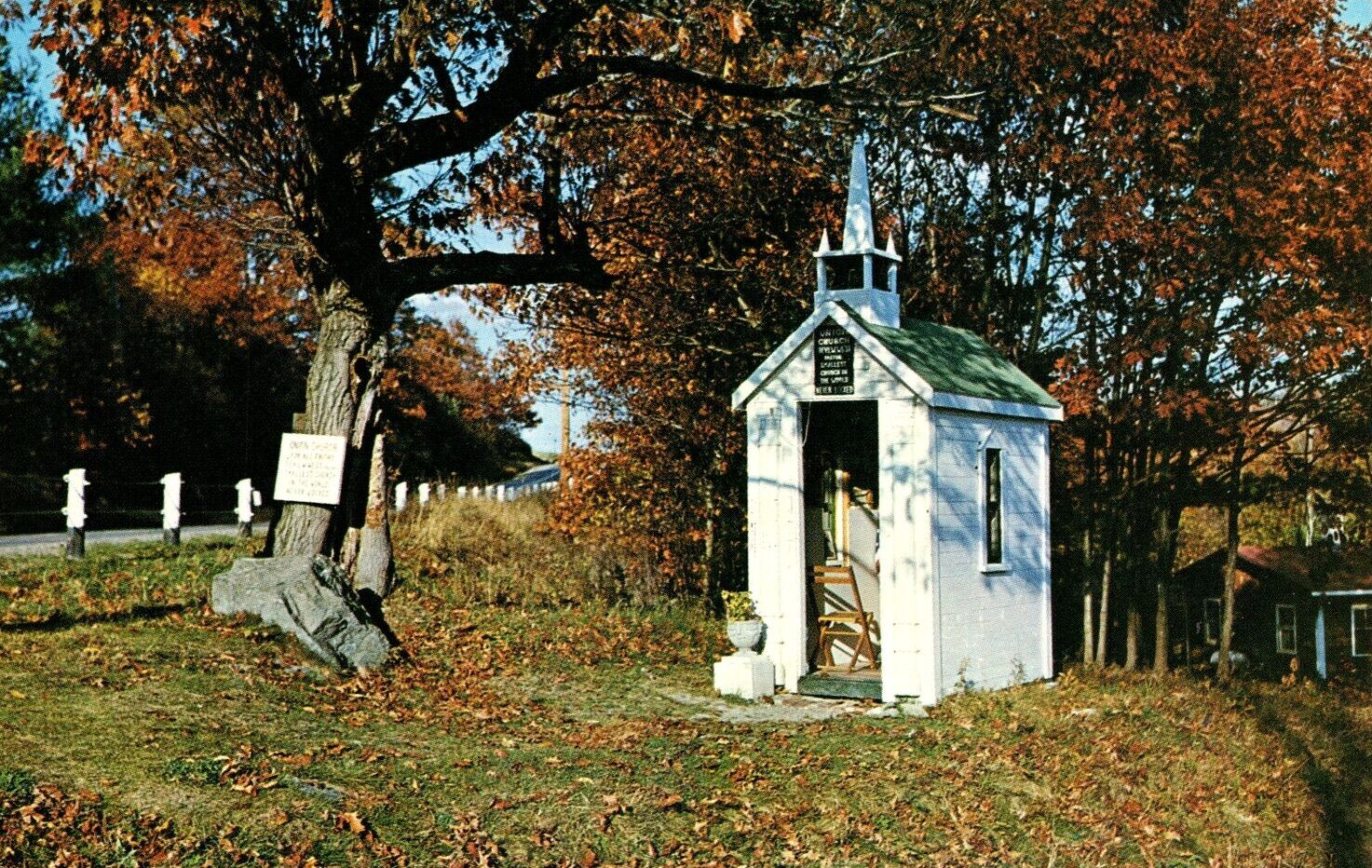
- Union Church c. 1958 on a postcard
- Union Church
- 44°01′17.6″N 69°39′11.1″W
- Location: Wiscasset, Maine
- Country: United States
- Denomination: Non-denominational

Architecture
- Architect: Rev. Louis W. West
- Completed: 1958

Specifications
- Capacity: 3
- Length: 7 feet (2.13 metres)
- Width: 4.5 feet (1.37 metres)

Union Church, once located in Wiscasset, Maine, was determined to be the world's smallest church according to the Guinness Book of World Records from 1958 until 1990.

== Description ==
The Union Church was constructed in 1958 by Reverend Louis W. West, a retired Baptist pastor from Boston, Massachusetts. The church could hold three occupants: a pastor and two parishioners. It is said that West performed ten marriages and one baptism in the church. According to the Guinness Book of World Records, the church's floor area measured 31 square feet (7 ft x 4.5 ft). Sources say that the steeple had a golf ball placed atop it and that the church itself was never locked.

=== Legacy ===
The Union Church lost its title in July 1990 to Cross Island Chapel on Mason's Pond in Oneida, New York.

Following West's death in 1966, the church was maintained as a memorial to his work. Over the years, Union Church deteriorated, was vandalized and eventually demolished. In April 2024, the Wiscasset Speedway erected an exact replica of the Union Church and dedicated it to Edna Verney, who (according to her granddaughter) was "fascinated by the church’s history and would visit it often with her children and friends."
