= Congregational Church of Edgecomb =

Historic church in Maine, United States

- U.S. National Register of Historic Places
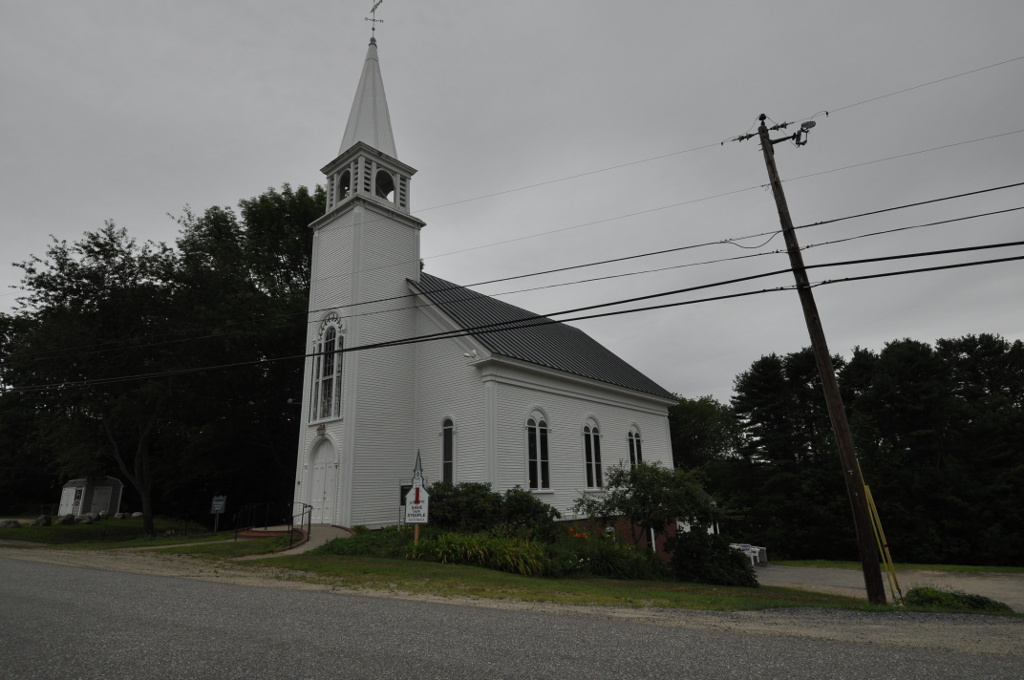

- Location within Maine Location within the United States
- Location: 15 Cross Point Rd., North Edgecomb, Maine
- Coordinates: 43°59′7″N 69°38′47″W
- Area: 3.5 acres (1.4 ha)
- Built: 1877
- Architect: Decker, William H.
- NRHP reference No.: 87000923
- Added to NRHP: June 12, 1987

The Congregational Church of Edgecomb, now the Edgecomb Community Church, is a historic church at 15 Cross Point Road in North Edgecomb, Maine. Built in 1877, it is the rural community's finest example of 19th-century religious architecture, and was listed on the National Register of Historic Places in 1987. The congregation, established about 1783, is affiliated with the United Church of Christ; the pastor is the Rev. Katherine E. Pinkham.

== Description and history ==
The Congregational Church of Edgecomb is located in northern Edgecomb, on the west side of Cross Point Road, a short way south of its junction with Eddy Road. It is a single-story wood frame structure, with a gabled roof, clapboarded exterior, and a brick foundation. A two-stage tower projects from the east-facing front. It has a tall first stage, which has the main entrance at the base, and a Palladian-style window with rounded-arch heads above, and molded corner boards rising to a bracketed cornice. The second stage is an open belfry, with rounded-arch openings, and slatted corner posts. The tower is topped by an octagonal steeple. The tower is flanked by narrow round-arch windows, and there are wider round-arch windows on the sides of the building. The interior retains original woodwork and other features, including oil-lamp chandeliers that have been converted to electric lighting.

The earliest recorded information about the Edgecomb church's congregation dates to 1783. It is documented as meeting in the community's town hall until about the time of the American Civil War, and then in a school, until this building was completed in 1881. The use of rounded arch windows is a departure from similar surviving rural churches of the period in Maine.

== See also ==
- National Register of Historic Places listings in Lincoln County, Maine
