= Fort Edgecomb =

Historic site in Maine, United States

- U.S. National Register of Historic Places
- U.S. Historic district
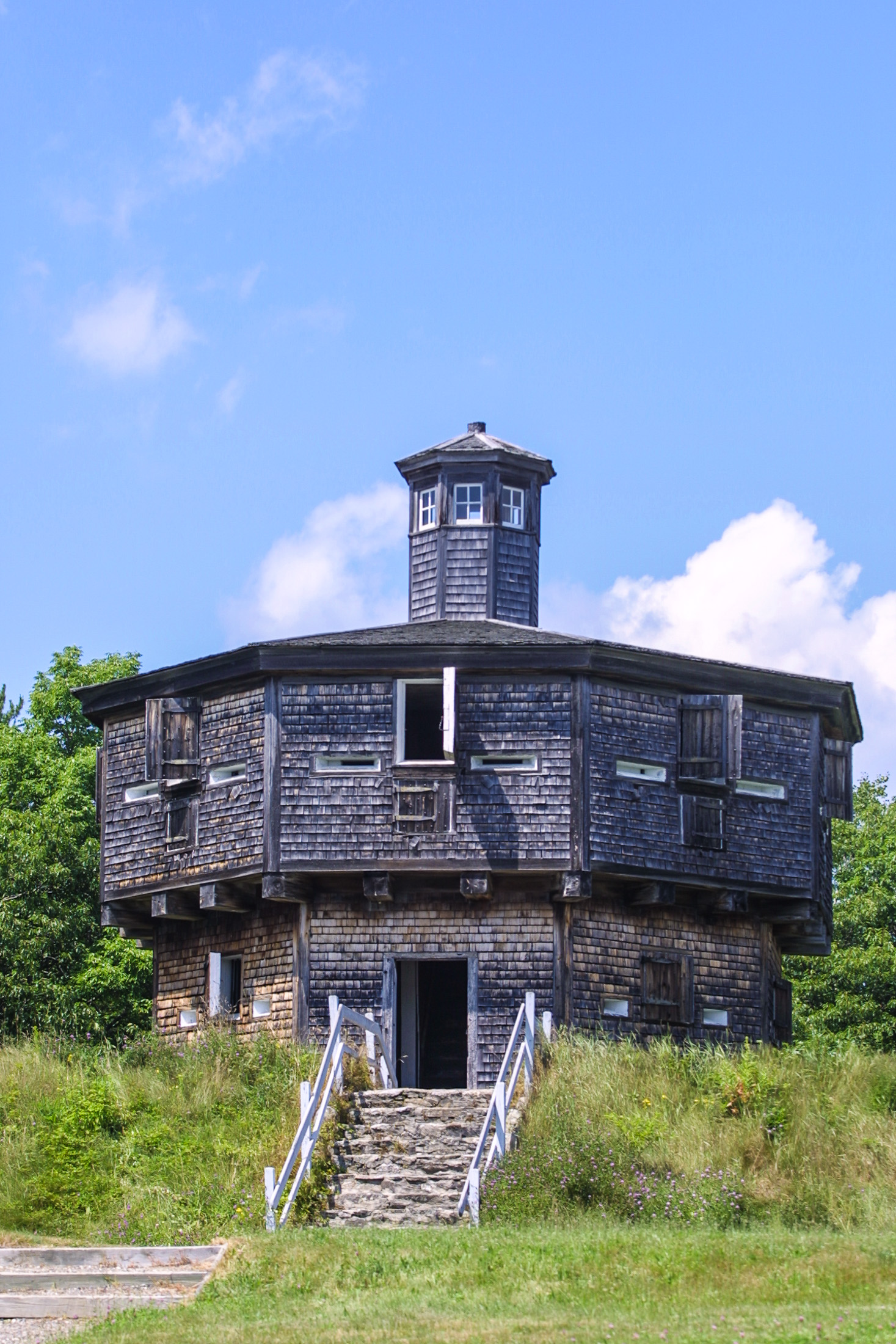

- Location within Maine
- Interactive map of Fort Edgecomb
- Location: On Davis Island in the Sheepscot River, Edgecomb, Maine
- Coordinates: 43°59′37″N 69°39′26″W
- Area: 3.1 acres (1.3 ha) (original) less than one acre (1991 increase)
- Built: 1808
- Architectural style: Octagon Mode
- NRHP reference No.: 69000020 (original); 91001814 (increase)

Significant dates
- Added to NRHP: October 1, 1969
- Boundary increase: December 22, 1991

Fort Edgecomb, built in 1808–1809, is a two-story octagonal wooden blockhouse with restored fortifications located on Davis Island in the town of Edgecomb, Lincoln County, Maine, United States. It is the centerpiece of the Fort Edgecomb State Historic Site. It was added to the National Register of Historic Places in 1969, with its boundaries increased to create a historic district in 1991.

== Description ==
Fort Edgecomb is located on Davis Island, a peninsula jutting into the Sheepscot River across from the village of Wiscasset. Davis Island is separated from the mainland by a short neck, and Fort Edgecomb is located at the island's southern end.

Fort Edgecomb's most prominent feature is an octagonal blockhouse, whose second floor is larger than its first, measuring 30 feet (9.1 m) compared to 27 feet (8.2 m). The ground floor walls have loopholes through which muskets could be fired, while the upper level had portholes for firing cannons. A third-floor attic leads up into a watchtower.

Although the blockhouse is the most visible feature, the fort's main armament was a water battery to defend the river. This battery originally had five cannons, including a 50-pounder columbiad and four 18-pounder smoothbore cannons. Each cannon was in its own bastion, with the bastions arranged in three tiers. The blockhouse also contained two carronades, which were a relatively short cannon of large bore.

== History ==
Fort Edgecomb was built as part of the second system of US fortifications, guarding the then-important port of Wiscasset, then one of the largest shipbuilding centers in New England. A war scare with the British over US trade with France during the Napoleonic Wars sparked the building of these forts, along with Thomas Jefferson's Embargo Act of 1807, which closed US ports and vessels to foreign trade. US engineer Moses Porter, later commander of the Regiment of Light Artillery, supervised the fort's construction.

Although Fort Edgecomb was built for defense, its first use (as with most of Maine's second system forts) was to enforce the embargo. This embargo was unpopular with Maine's merchants, and it is said that one of two times Fort Edgecomb's cannon were fired was in salute at James Madison's inauguration on 4 March 1809 (or, less tactfully, to celebrate his lifting of Jefferson's embargo). The cannons were fired once more on 14 February 1815, when word was received of peace with the British.

During the War of 1812, the post saw considerable activity, holding British prisoners of war, many of them brought to Wiscasset by American privateers. In 1814, the fortress became an important base in defending against a possible British attack on mid-coast Maine. It remained manned until 1818, and was reactivated during the Civil War.

The Friends of Fort Edgecomb celebrated its bicentennial on 13 June 2009, on the grounds of the fort.

== See also ==
- National Register of Historic Places listings in Lincoln County, Maine
