= Wiscasset, Maine =

- Town
- Train waiting to depart in Wiscasset

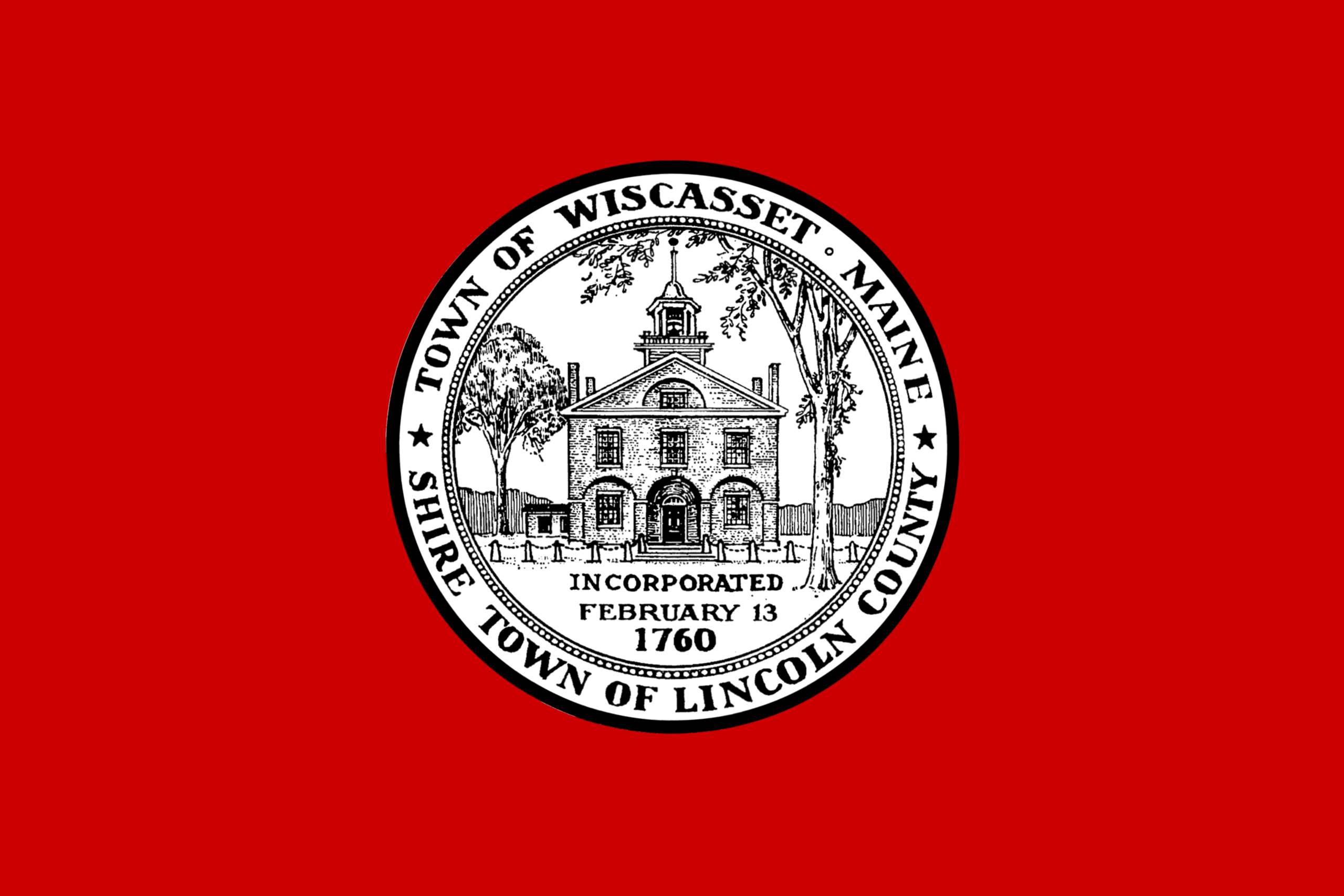
- Flag Seal
- Nickname: Maine's Prettiest Village
- Location in Lincoln County and the state of Maine.
- Coordinates: 44°00′35″N 69°40′12″W
- Country: United States
- State: Maine
- County: Lincoln County
- Settled: 1660
- Incorporated as Pownalborough: February 13, 1760
- Incorporated as Wiscasset: June 10, 1802

Government
  - Type: Town Manager - Board of Selectmen

Area
  - Total: 27.66 sq mi (71.64 km^{2})
  - Land: 24.63 sq mi (63.79 km^{2})
  - Water: 3.03 sq mi (7.85 km^{2})
- Elevation: 135 ft (41 m)

Population (2020)
  - Total: 3,742
  - Density: 152/sq mi (58.7/km^{2})
- Time zone: UTC-5 (Eastern)
  - Summer (DST): UTC-4 (Eastern)
- ZIP code: 04578
- Area code: 207
- GNIS feature ID: 582825
- Website: www.wiscasset.gov

Wiscasset is a town in and the seat of Lincoln County, Maine, United States. The municipality is located in the state of Maine's Mid Coast region. The population was 3,742 as of the 2020 census. It contains the census-designated place of the same name. Home to the Chewonki Foundation, Wiscasset is a tourist destination noted for early architecture and as the location of Red's Eats restaurant.

== History ==
In 1605, Samuel de Champlain is said to have landed here and exchanged gifts with the Indians. Situated on the tidal Sheepscot River, Wiscasset was first settled by Europeans in 1660. The community was abandoned during the French and Indian Wars, and the King Philip's War in 1675 and then resettled around 1730. In 1760, it was incorporated as Pownalborough after Colonial Governor Thomas Pownall. In 1802, it resumed its original Abenaki name, Wiscasset, which means "coming out from the harbor but you don't see where."

During the Revolutionary War, the British warship Rainbow harbored itself in Wiscasset Harbor and held the town at bay until the town gave the warship essential supplies.

In 1775, Captain Jack Bunker supposedly robbed the payroll of a British supply ship, Falmouth Packet, that was stowed in Wiscasset Harbor. He was chased for days and caught on Little Seal Island. His treasure reportedly has never been found.

Because of the siege during the Revolutionary War, Fort Edgecomb was built in 1808 on the opposite bank of the Sheepscot to protect the town harbor. Wiscasset's prosperity left behind fine early architecture, particularly in the Federal style when the seaport was important in privateering. Two dwellings of the period, Castle Tucker and the Nickels-Sortwell House, are now museums operated by Historic New England.

The seaport became a center for shipbuilding, fishing and lumber. Wiscasset quickly became the busiest seaport north of Boston until the embargo of 1807 halted much trade with England. Most of Wiscasset's business and trade was destroyed.

Maine was officially admitted as a state in 1820 with the passage of the Maine-Missouri Compromise. The town of Wiscasset was considered for the state capital, but lost the position because of its proximity to the ocean.

During the Civil War, Wiscasset had many of its residents that joined the 20th Maine Volunteer Infantry Regiment. Its regiment was commended for fighting bravely at the Battle of Gettysburg.

Rail service to Wiscasset began with the Knox and Lincoln Railroad in 1871. The Knox and Lincoln was merged into the Maine Central Railroad in 1901. Prior to the completion of the Carlton Bridge over the Kennebec River in 1927, Wiscasset was connected to the national rail network by a railroad ferry crossing.

Wiscasset was the seaport terminal and standard gauge interchange of the 2-foot gauge Wiscasset, Waterville and Farmington Railway (WW&F). Construction began in Wiscasset in 1894. Train service began in 1895 as the Wiscasset and Quebec Railroad. By 1913, the railroad operated daily freight and passenger service 43.5 miles north to Albion with an 11-mile freight branch from Weeks Mills to North Vassalboro.

Passengers and freight increasingly used highway transportation after World War I. Frank Winter bought the WW&F railroad about 1930 to move lumber from Branch Mills to his schooners Hesper and Luther Little. During the early 1930s the early morning train from Albion to Wiscasset and the afternoon train back to Albion carried the last 2-foot gauge railway post office (RPO) in the United States. A derailment of the morning train in Whitefield on June 15, 1933, terminated railroad operations before the schooners could be loaded with lumber for shipment to larger coastal cities. The two schooners were abandoned in Wiscasset shortly after Winter's premature demise in 1936, and they eventually became tourist attractions. Over the next 62 years, the weathered vessels became widely photographed as they were visible from a bridge along U.S. 1 that runs by the town. Wiscasset officials finally removed the rotted remains in 1998, after a violent storm took out the final masts.

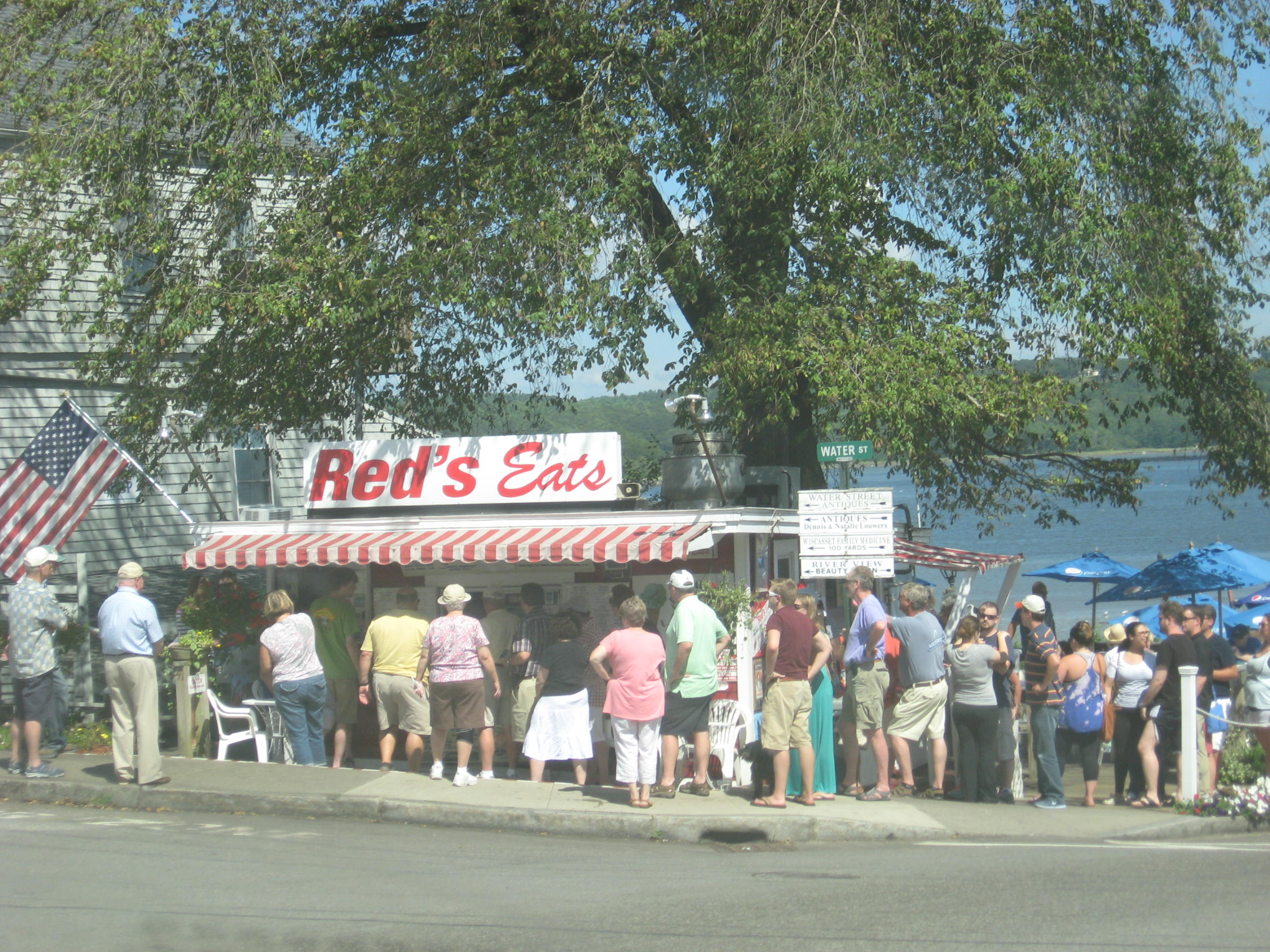
Red's Eats, a famous Lobster takeout restaurant

Red's Eats is located by the Donald E. Davey Bridge on Route 1 since 1954. The small takeout restaurant has been featured in more than 20 magazines and newspapers, including USA Today and National Geographic and several major television network newscasts, including Sunday Morning on CBS and a report by Bill Geist. The restaurant has been reported to be "the biggest traffic jam in Maine".

From 1958 to 1990, Wiscasset was the home of the Union Church, considered by the Guinness Book of World Records to be the world's smallest church. The church was torn down due to age; however, in April 2024 Wiscasset Speedway erected an exact replica.

In 2009, the town lost a legal battle to reclaim an original copy of the Declaration of Independence that was accidentally sold by the estate of the daughter of a former town official, Sol Holbrook. A Virginia court ruled the true owner was Richard L. Adams Jr., who paid $475,000 (equivalent to about $850,000 in 2025) for the document in 2002. The State of Maine paid nearly $40,000 in legal fees.

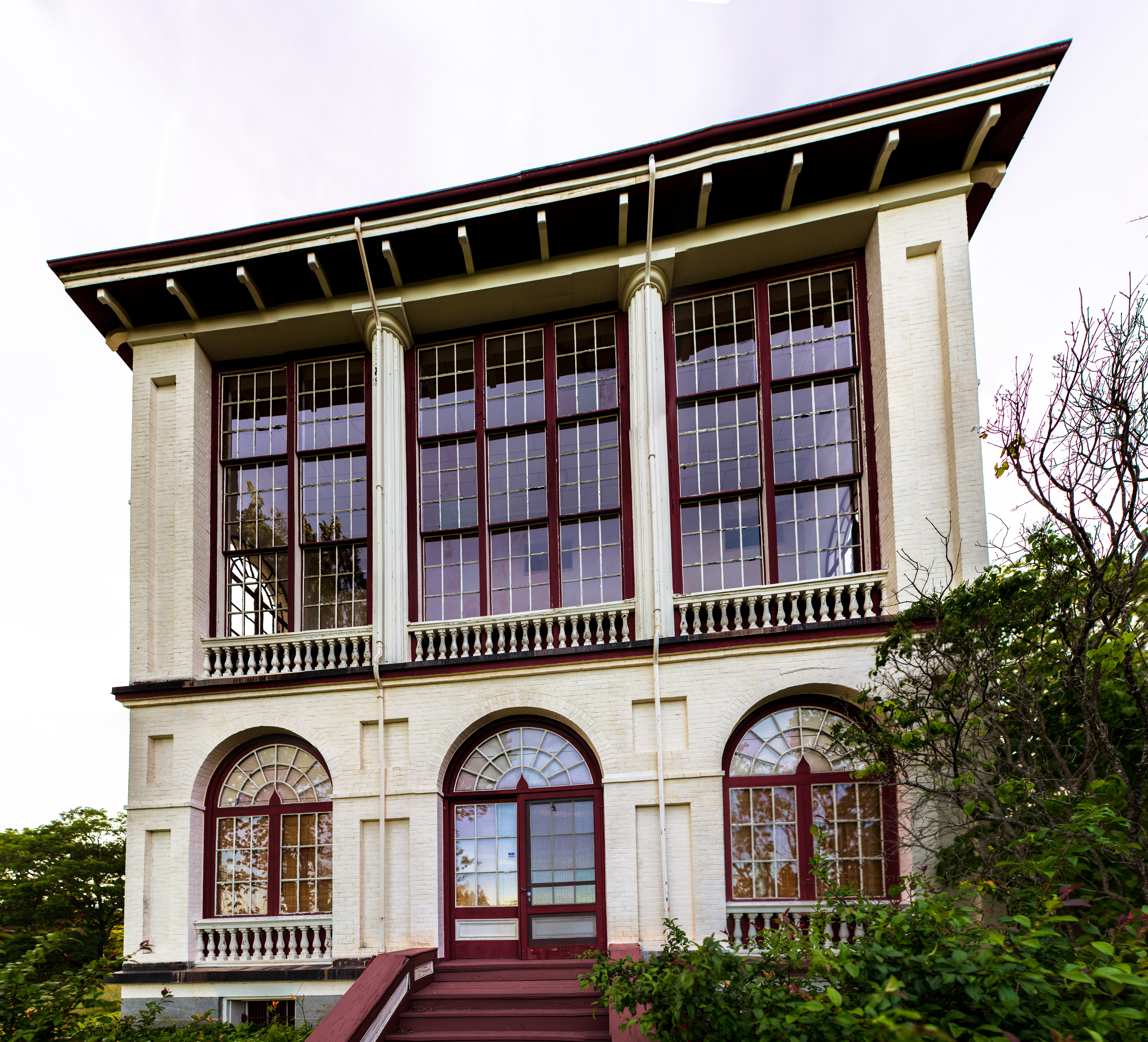
Castle Tucker, built 1807

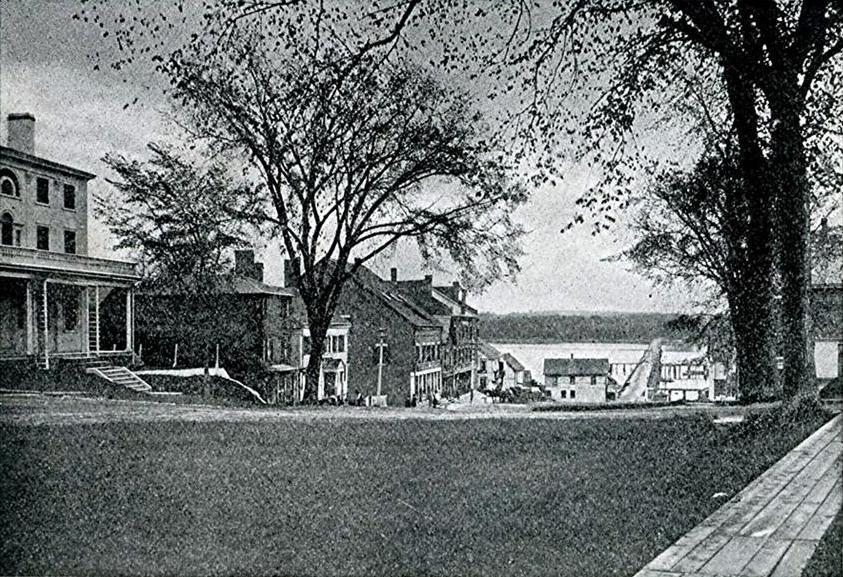
Main Street in 1900

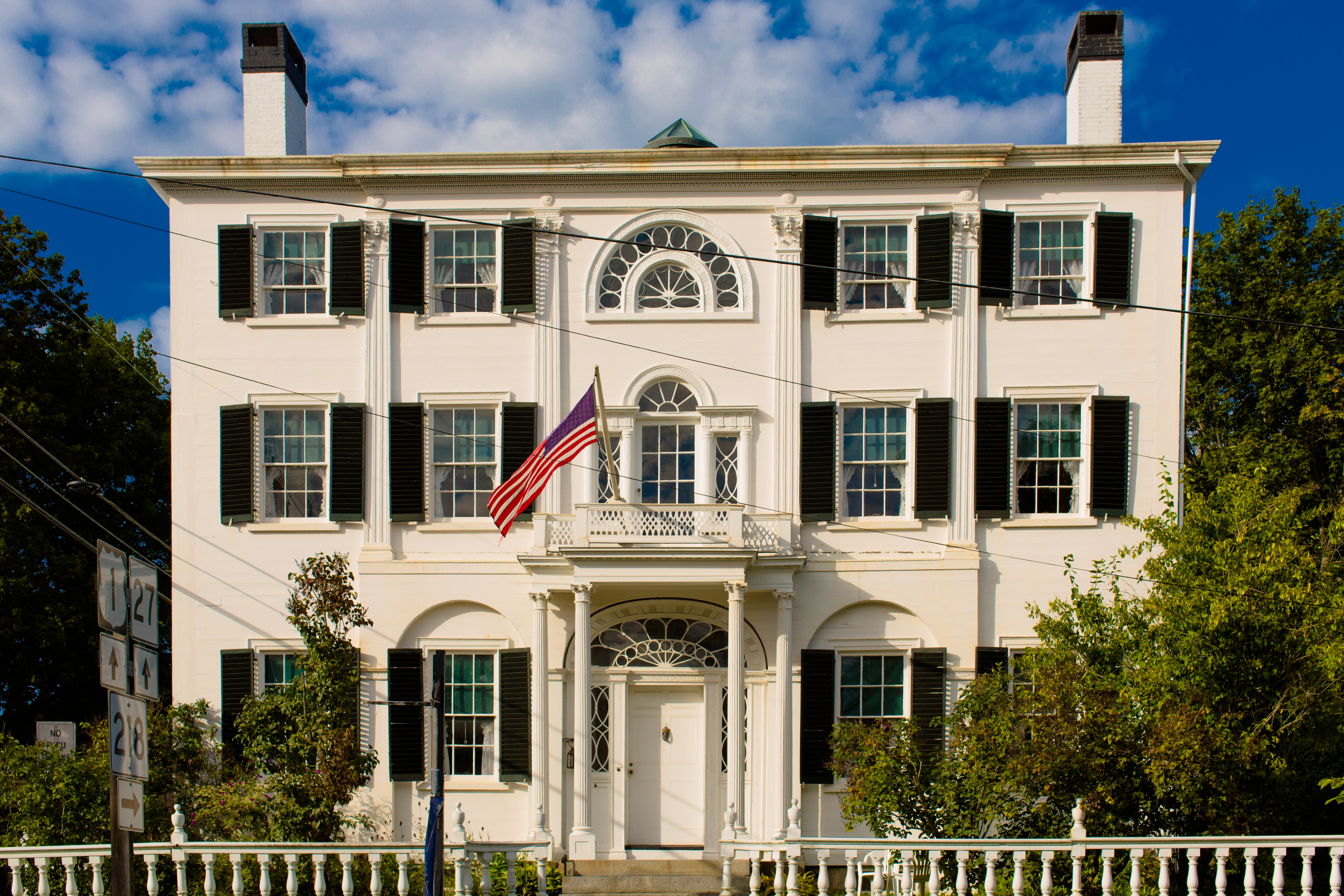
Nickels-Sortwell House, built 1807

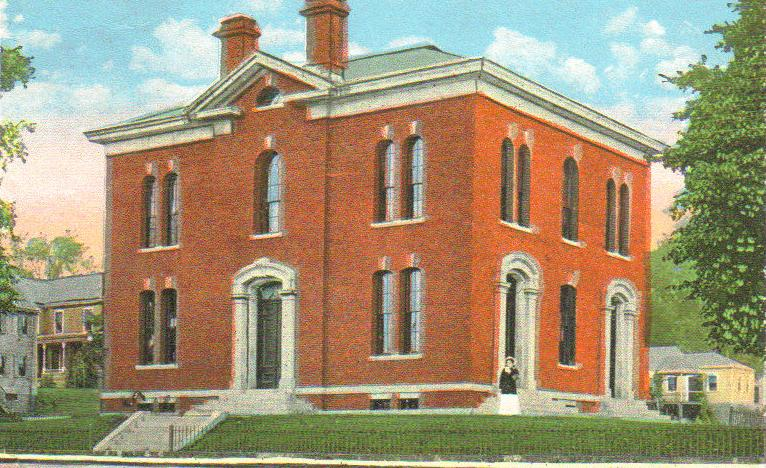
Old Custom House and Post Office Built 1870

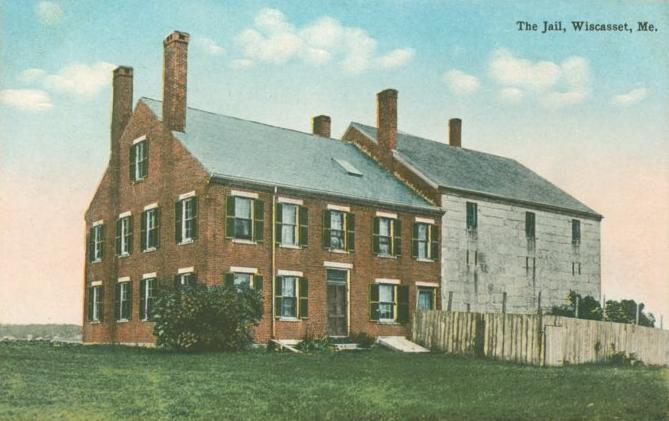
Wiscasset Jail and Museum c. 1912

== Industry ==
Aerial view of downtown Wiscasset

From 1972 until 1996, Wiscasset was home to Maine Yankee, a pressurized water reactor on Bailey Point, and the only nuclear power plant in the state. The Maine Yankee nuclear power plant was decommissioned in 1996 and is inoperative. Since the closing of Maine Yankee, Wiscasset faced a severe loss in jobs, residents, and public school enrollment. In a high school graduation speech delivered by Bradley Whitaker, he stated, "The loss of those jobs changed our community, the surrounding towns and our school system. We've all had friends move away, our parents have had their taxes rise dramatically, enrollment has plummeted, we've watched teachers and administrators leave, programs and sports eliminated."

The town attempted to replace Maine Yankee with a gasification plant in 2007, but the plan subsequently failed due to a town vote.

Wiscasset was also home of the Mason Station, a coal and steam-powered plant along the Sheepscot River south of town that first went online in 1941. The plant went offline in 1991. The property is currently proposed for redevelopment as a mixed-use office, light-industrial, residential and retail complex.

In 2008, the Chewonki Foundation announced plans for a tidal power plant along the Sheepscot River. A permit was issued by the Federal Energy Regulatory Commission (FERC) in 2009. The project has not yet gone forward.

Rynel Inc., founded in 1973, developed and built processing equipment and hydrophilic polyurethane prepolymer products. The company was purchased by Mölnlycke Health Care company in 2010. In January 2014, the company announced its expansion plans for its Wiscasset manufacturing facility.

== Geography ==
According to the United States Census Bureau, the town has a total area of 27.66 square miles (71.64 km^{2}), of which 24.63 square miles (63.79 km^{2}) is land and 3.03 square miles (7.85 km^{2}) is water. Wiscasset is drained by the Sheepscot River.

=== Climate ===
This climatic region is typified by large seasonal temperature differences, with warm to hot (and often humid) summers and cold (sometimes severely cold) winters. According to the Köppen Climate Classification system, Wiscasset has a humid continental climate, abbreviated "Dfb" on climate maps.

Climate data for Wiscasset Airport, Maine, 1991–2020 normals, extremes 1996–present
| Month | Jan | Feb | Mar | Apr | May | Jun | Jul | Aug | Sep | Oct | Nov | Dec | Year |
|---|---|---|---|---|---|---|---|---|---|---|---|---|---|
| Record high °F (°C) | 66 (19) | 65 (18) | 85 (29) | 83 (28) | 94 (34) | 99 (37) | 98 (37) | 95 (35) | 95 (35) | 84 (29) | 78 (26) | 66 (19) | 98 (37) |
| Mean maximum °F (°C) | 53.5 (11.9) | 50.3 (10.2) | 60.6 (15.9) | 71.3 (21.8) | 85.2 (29.6) | 87.4 (30.8) | 90.6 (32.6) | 88.3 (31.3) | 85.6 (29.8) | 74.3 (23.5) | 64.4 (18.0) | 55.9 (13.3) | 92.3 (33.5) |
| Mean daily maximum °F (°C) | 32.2 (0.1) | 35.0 (1.7) | 42.6 (5.9) | 53.9 (12.2) | 64.8 (18.2) | 73.7 (23.2) | 79.4 (26.3) | 78.6 (25.9) | 70.9 (21.6) | 59.1 (15.1) | 47.9 (8.8) | 37.8 (3.2) | 56.3 (13.5) |
| Daily mean °F (°C) | 22.1 (−5.5) | 24.4 (−4.2) | 32.8 (0.4) | 43.3 (6.3) | 53.6 (12.0) | 62.9 (17.2) | 68.7 (20.4) | 67.6 (19.8) | 60.0 (15.6) | 48.7 (9.3) | 38.7 (3.7) | 28.6 (−1.9) | 45.9 (7.7) |
| Mean daily minimum °F (°C) | 12.1 (−11.1) | 13.8 (−10.1) | 23.0 (−5.0) | 32.7 (0.4) | 42.3 (5.7) | 52.0 (11.1) | 57.9 (14.4) | 56.6 (13.7) | 49.1 (9.5) | 38.4 (3.6) | 29.4 (−1.4) | 19.5 (−6.9) | 35.6 (2.0) |
| Mean minimum °F (°C) | −7.9 (−22.2) | −5.3 (−20.7) | 3.0 (−16.1) | 21.7 (−5.7) | 30.5 (−0.8) | 41.4 (5.2) | 49.4 (9.7) | 46.3 (7.9) | 34.5 (1.4) | 26.4 (−3.1) | 14.9 (−9.5) | 0.8 (−17.3) | −11.5 (−24.2) |
| Record low °F (°C) | −20 (−29) | −21 (−29) | −11 (−24) | 15 (−9) | 27 (−3) | 33 (1) | 45 (7) | 40 (4) | 28 (−2) | 20 (−7) | 4 (−16) | −17 (−27) | −21 (−29) |
| Average precipitation inches (mm) | 3.51 (89) | 3.08 (78) | 3.77 (96) | 3.94 (100) | 3.46 (88) | 4.47 (114) | 3.44 (87) | 3.08 (78) | 4.15 (105) | 5.13 (130) | 4.45 (113) | 4.22 (107) | 46.70 (1,186) |
| Average precipitation days (≥ 0.01 in) | 11.6 | 10.5 | 11.2 | 11.7 | 13.3 | 14.2 | 12.7 | 12.7 | 11.8 | 13.2 | 11.9 | 12.3 | 147.1 |
Source: NOAA (mean maxima/minima 2006–2020)

== Demographics ==
Historical population
| Census | Pop. | Note | %± |
|---|---|---|---|
| 1790 | 2,055 | | — |
| 1800 | 1,678 | | −18.3% |
| 1810 | 2,083 | | 24.1% |
| 1820 | 2,138 | | 2.6% |
| 1830 | 2,255 | | 5.5% |
| 1840 | 2,314 | | 2.6% |
| 1850 | 2,332 | | 0.8% |
| 1860 | 2,318 | | −0.6% |
| 1870 | 1,977 | | −14.7% |
| 1880 | 1,847 | | −6.6% |
| 1890 | 1,733 | | −6.2% |
| 1900 | 1,273 | | −26.5% |
| 1910 | 1,287 | | 1.1% |
| 1920 | 1,192 | | −7.4% |
| 1930 | 1,186 | | −0.5% |
| 1940 | 1,231 | | 3.8% |
| 1950 | 1,584 | | 28.7% |
| 1960 | 1,800 | | 13.6% |
| 1970 | 2,244 | | 24.7% |
| 1980 | 2,832 | | 26.2% |
| 1990 | 3,339 | | 17.9% |
| 2000 | 3,603 | | 7.9% |
| 2010 | 3,732 | | 3.6% |
| 2020 | 3,742 | | 0.3% |
U.S. Decennial Census

=== 2010 census ===
As of the census of 2010, there were 3,732 people, 1,520 households, and 993 families living in the town. The population density was 151.5 inhabitants per square mile (58.5/km^{2}). There were 1,782 housing units at an average density of 72.4 per square mile (28.0/km^{2}). The racial makeup of the town was 96.8% White, 0.5% African American, 0.4% Native American, 0.9% Asian, 0.1% from other races, and 1.4% from two or more races. Hispanic or Latino of any race were 1.0% of the population.

There were 1,520 households, of which 27.8% had children under the age of 18 living with them, 49.1% were married couples living together, 10.9% had a female householder with no husband present, 5.3% had a male householder with no wife present, and 34.7% were non-families. 28.1% of all households were made up of individuals, and 11.4% had someone living alone who was 65 years of age or older. The average household size was 2.32 and the average family size was 2.79.

The median age in the town was 43.5 years. 19.7% of residents were under the age of 18; 8.8% were between the ages of 18 and 24; 24.1% were from 25 to 44; 31.1% were from 45 to 64; and 16.4% were 65 years of age or older. The gender makeup of the town was 50.6% male and 49.4% female.

=== 2000 census ===
Per the census of 2000, there were 3,603 people, 1,472 households, and 972 families living in the town. The population density was 146.5 inhabitants per square mile (56.6/km^{2}). There were 1,612 housing units at an average density of 65.6 per square mile (25.3/km^{2}). The racial makeup of the town was 98.00% White, 0.31% Black or African American, 0.17% Native American, 0.50% Asian, 0.31% from other races, and 0.72% from two or more races. Hispanic or Latino of any race were 0.67% of the population.

The median income for a household in the town was $37,378, and the median income for a family was $46,799. Males had a median income of $31,365 versus $21,831 for females. The per capita income for the town was $18,233. About 6.9% of families and 12.5% of the population were below the poverty line, including 16.2% of those under age 18 and 14.9% of those age 65 or over.

== Sites of interest ==
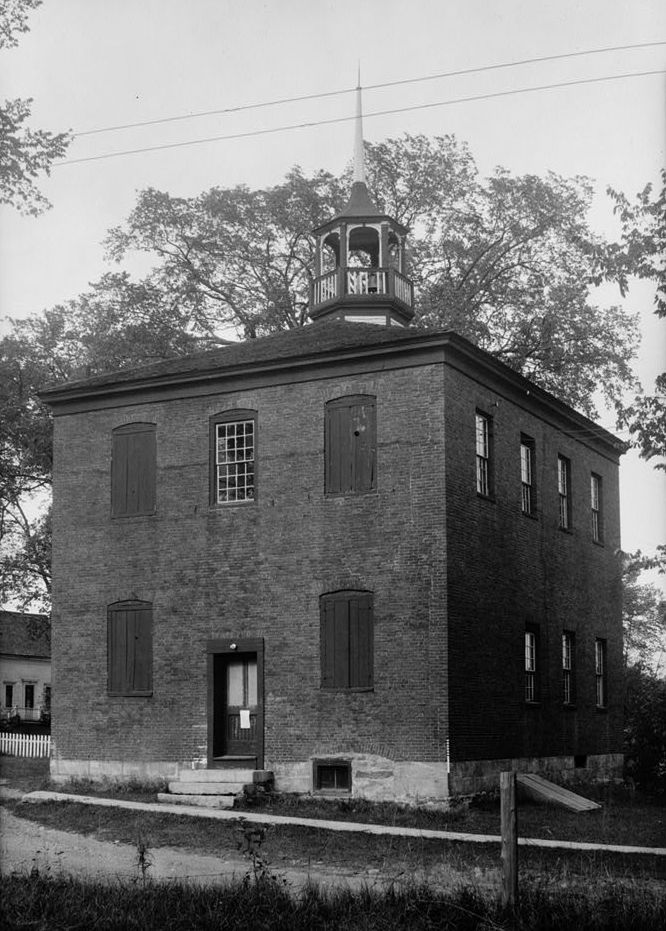
Old Academy in 1936

- Captain George Scott House
- Castle Tucker
- Maine Eastern Railroad
- Nickels-Sortwell House
- Red Brick School
- United States Customhouse and Post Office
- Wiscasset Jail and Museum
- Wiscasset Middle High School
- Wiscasset, Waterville and Farmington Railway

== Notable people ==
- Hugh J. Anderson, 20th governor of Maine
- George E. Bailey, murder victim
- Jeremiah Bailey, US congressman
- Thomas Bowman, US congressman
- Annie Woodman Stocking Boyce, missionary teacher in Iran
- Mildred Burrage, artist
- Pamela Cahill, state legislator
- Franklin Clark, US congressman
- John H. C. Coffin, astronomer
- Orchard Cook, US congressman
- Leland Cunningham, astronomer
- Charles Gibbons, state legislator
- Ellen F. Golden, executive
- Juliana Hatfield, musician
- Marjoie Kilkelly, state legislator
- John D. McCrate, US congressman
- Joseph Ladd Neal, architect
- Amos Nourse, US congressman
- Edward Polewarczyk, state legislator
- Thomas Rice, state legislator
- Thomas Rice, US congressman
- Ted Sannella, dancer
- Joseph Sewall Smith, Medal of Honor recipient
- Samuel E. Smith, 10th governor of Maine
- Richard Hawley Tucker, astronomer
- Cadwallader C. Washburn, 11th governor of Wisconsin
- Charles Ames Washburn, US minister to Paraguay
- Israel Washburn Jr., 29th governor of Maine
- William D. Washburn, US congressman
- Abiel Wood, US congressman

== In literature ==
- Author Lea Wait has written an ongoing series of children's novels that are set in Wiscasset, including: Stopping to Home, set in 1806 (Named a Smithsonian Magazine Notable Children's Book); Seaward Born (1805, the setting of this book moved from Charleston, SC to Boston, MA to Wiscasset); Wintering Well (1820); Finest Kind (1838); and Uncertain Glory (1861).
- Wiscasset is one of many important Maine settings in The Moosepath Saga by Van Reid, an ongoing series of historical novels taking place in the late 1890s and including Cordelia Underwood, or the Marvelous Beginnings of the Moosepath League, which was named a New York Times Notable Book of the Year. In these tales of adventure and humor, events by turns perilous and comic occur in Wiscasset, including the hunt for an escaped circus bear and a pursuit and gun battle on the Sheepscott River off the shores of the town. Certain historic homes and landmarks, including the Old Jail, form part of the settings; and at least two characters — County Sheriff Charles Piper and Jailer Seth Patterson — are based on real people.
