= Edgecomb, Maine =

Town in Maine, United States

- Town
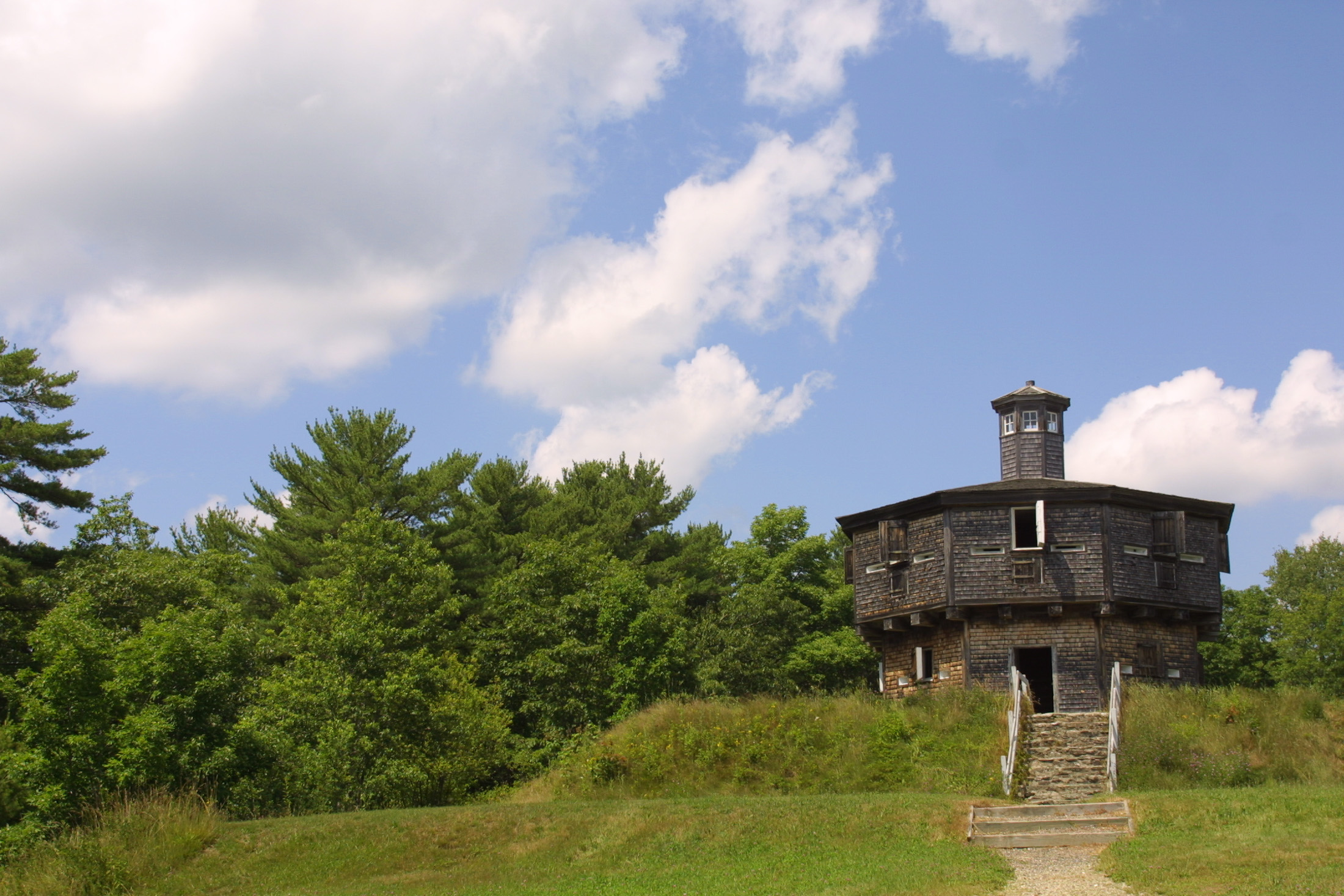
- Fort Edgecomb on Davis Island

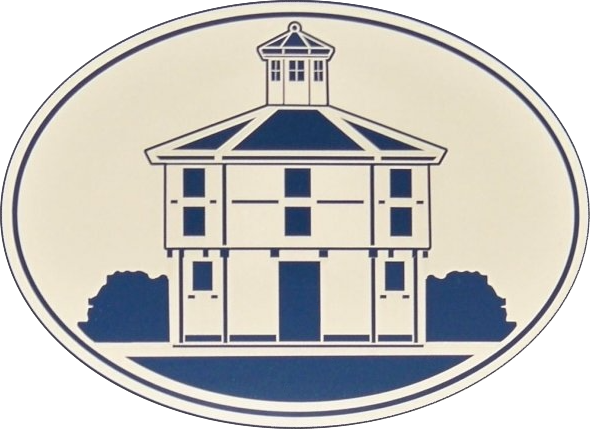
- Seal

- Location in Lincoln County and the state of Maine
- Coordinates: 43°59′08″N 69°37′57″W
- Country: United States
- State: Maine
- County: Lincoln
- Incorporated: March 3, 1774

Area
  - Total: 20.78 sq mi (53.82 km^{2})
  - Land: 18.07 sq mi (46.80 km^{2})
  - Water: 2.71 sq mi (7.02 km^{2})
- Elevation: 213 ft (65 m)

Population (2020)
  - Total: 1,188
  - Density: 69/sq mi (26.7/km^{2})
- Time zone: UTC-5 (Eastern (EST))
  - Summer (DST): UTC-4 (EDT)
- ZIP code: 04556
- Area code: 207
- FIPS code: 23-22675
- GNIS feature ID: 582462
- Website: edgecomb.org

Edgecomb is a town in Lincoln County, Maine, United States. The population was 1,188 at the 2020 census. The town was incorporated on March 3, 1774, and was named after George Edgcumbe, 1st Earl of Mount Edgcumbe, a supporter of the colonists. Edgecomb uncludes the communities of East Edgecomb, North Edgecomb, and Pools Landing.

Historically, Edgecomb's economy included shipbuilding, sawmills, famring, brickmaking, fishing, and mineral mining. The town is also home to Fort Edgecomb, a Maine State Historic Site, along with several historic buildings that reflect its past.

== Geography ==
According to the United States Census Bureau, the town has a total area of 20.78 square miles (53.82 km^{2}), of which 18.07 square miles (46.80 km^{2}) is land and 2.71 square miles (7.02 km^{2}) is water.

== History ==
Although there is not much industry in Edgecomb today, there is a diverse history of ship building, saw mills, brick yards, farming, landing ocean harvests, and rock and felspar mining operations.

== Demographics ==
Historical population
Census	Pop.	Note	%±
1790	755		—
1800	989		31.0%
1810	1,288		30.2%
1820	1,629		26.5%
1830	1,258		−22.8%
1840	1,238		−1.6%
1850	1,231		−0.6%
1860	1,112		−9.7%
1870	1,056		−5.0%
1880	872		−17.4%
1890	749		−14.1%
1900	607		−19.0%
1910	513		−15.5%
1920	428		−16.6%
1930	367		−14.3%
1940	411		12.0%
1950	447		8.8%
1960	453		1.3%
1970	549		21.2%
1980	841		53.2%
1990	993		18.1%
2000	1,090		9.8%
2010	1,249		14.6%
2020	1,188		−4.9%
U.S. Decennial Census

=== 2010 census ===
As of the census of 2010, there were 1,249 people, 523 households, and 356 families living in the town. The population density was 69.1 inhabitants per square mile (26.7/km^{2}). There were 755 housing units at an average density of 41.8 per square mile (16.1/km^{2}). The racial makeup of the town was 96.2% White, 0.2% African American, 0.4% Native American, 1.5% Asian, and 1.8% from two or more races. Hispanic or Latino of any race were 0.3% of the population.

There were 523 households, of which 30.0% had children under the age of 18 living with them, 55.4% were married couples living together, 8.8% had a female householder with no husband present, 3.8% had a male householder with no wife present, and 31.9% were non-families. 26.0% of all households were made up of individuals, and 11.1% had someone living alone who was 65 years of age or older. The average household size was 2.37 and the average family size was 2.82.

The median age in the town was 46.4 years. 22.3% of residents were under the age of 18; 4.9% were between the ages of 18 and 24; 20.2% were from 25 to 44; 34.5% were from 45 to 64; and 18% were 65 years of age or older. The gender makeup of the town was 50.1% male and 49.9% female.

=== 2000 census ===
As of the census of 2000, there were 1,090 people, 466 households, and 328 families living in the town. The population density was 60.3 inhabitants per square mile (23.3/km^{2}). There were 572 housing units at an average density of 31.6 per square mile (12.2/km^{2}). The racial makeup of the town was 98.72% White, 0.28% Native American, 0.18% Asian, and 0.83% from two or more races. Hispanic or Latino of any race were 0.09% of the population.

There were 466 households, out of which 29.8% had children under the age of 18 living with them, 60.1% were married couples living together, 6.7% had a female householder with no husband present, and 29.6% were non-families. 25.5% of all households were made up of individuals, and 12.7% had someone living alone who was 65 years of age or older. The average household size was 2.34 and the average family size was 2.78.

In the town, the population was spread out, with 23.0% under the age of 18, 3.7% from 18 to 24, 25.4% from 25 to 44, 31.5% from 45 to 64, and 16.4% who were 65 years of age or older. The median age was 44 years. For every 100 females, there were 93.6 males. For every 100 females age 18 and over, there were 93.3 males.

The median income for a household in the town was $43,833, and the median income for a family was $49,861. Males had a median income of $32,321 versus $24,474 for females. The per capita income for the town was $23,788. About 2.8% of families and 4.3% of the population were below the poverty line, including 2.0% of those under age 18 and 4.5% of those age 65 or over.

== Sites of interest ==
- Congregational Church of Edgecomb
- Fort Edgecomb
- John Moore House
- Stephen Parsons House

== Notable people ==
- Nancie Atwell, educator
- Earl Cunningham, painter
- Paul LePage, businessman and politician; served as 74th governor of Maine
- Van Reid, novelist
- Lea Wait, novelist
