= Lobster roll =

New England dish

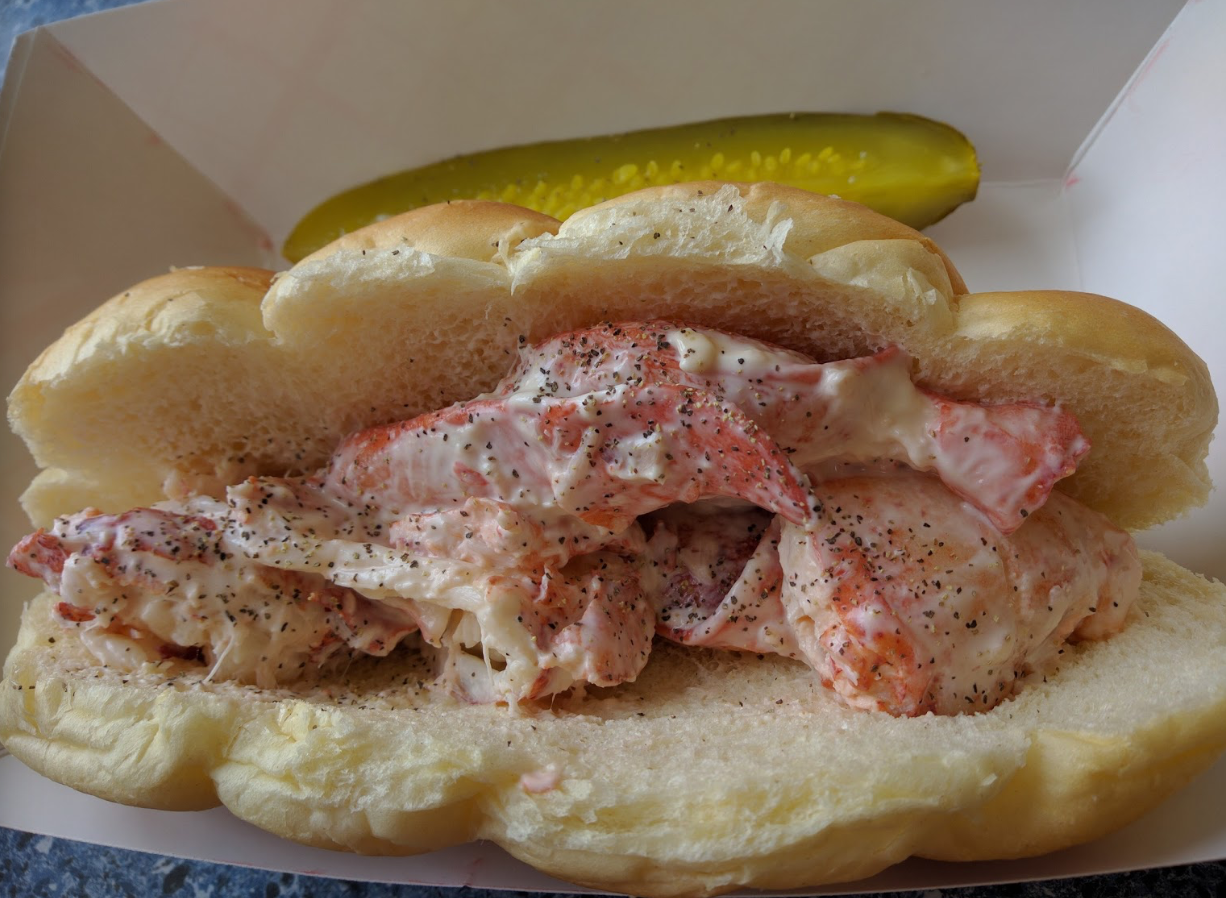
- Lobster roll served at Steamers Seafood Market in Newton, Massachusetts
- Type: Sandwich
- Place of origin: United States
- Region or state: Connecticut
- Main ingredients: New England–style hot dog bun or similar bread roll; lobster meat; mayonnaise or drawn butter; sometimes celery or scallion

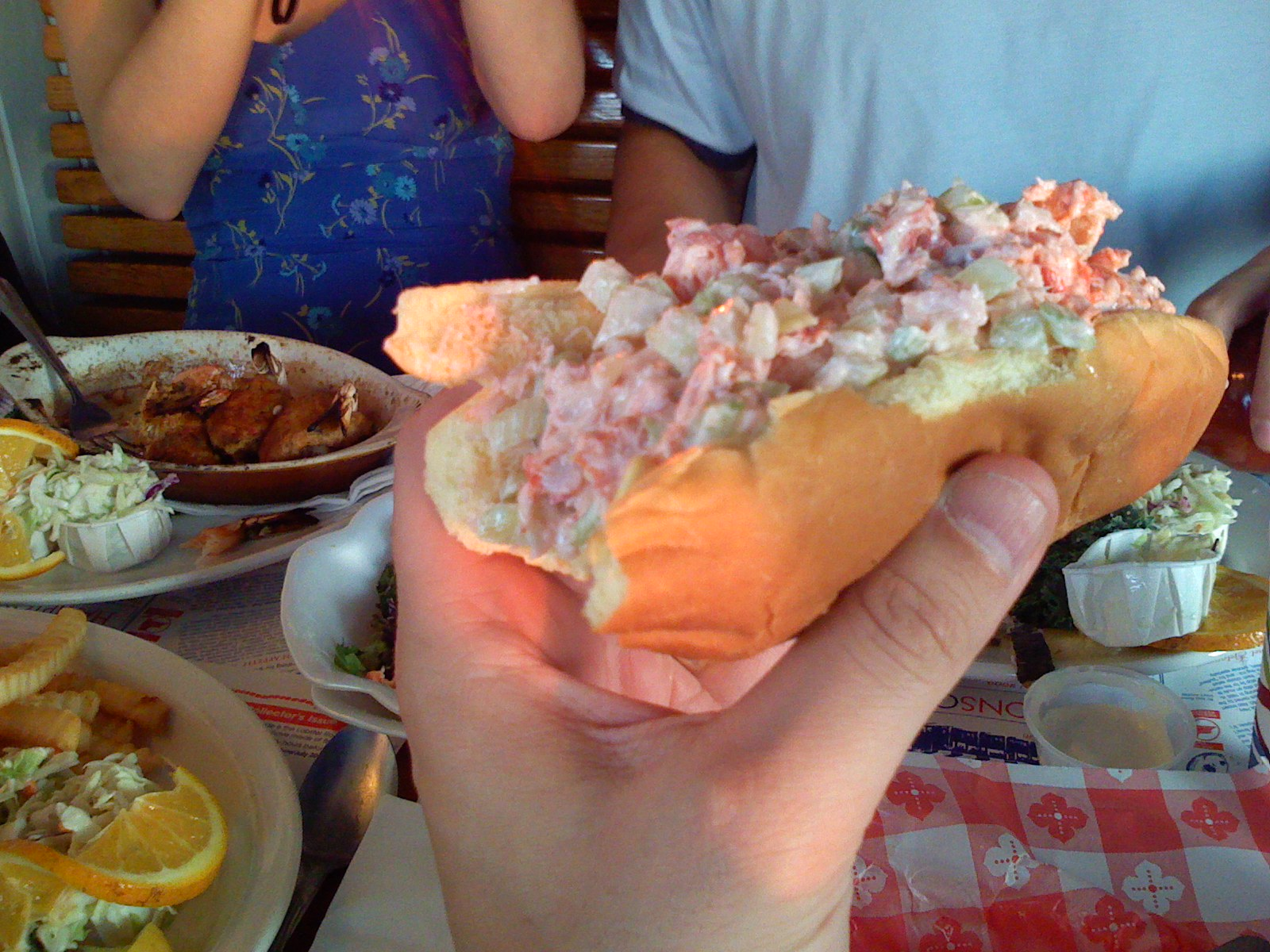
A lobster salad-style roll, Amagansett, New York, on Long Island

A lobster roll is a North American dish comprising lobster meat served on a grilled hot dog–style bun, commonly credited to have been invented in Milford, Connecticut. The filling may also contain butter, lemon juice, salt, and black pepper, with variants made in some parts of New England replacing the butter with mayonnaise. Other versions may contain diced celery or scallion. Potato chips or French fries are typical side dishes.

== History ==
The credit for the invention of the lobster roll is disputed. The Encyclopedia of American Food and Drink claims the lobster roll originated as a hot dish at a restaurant named Perry's in Milford, Connecticut, as early as 1929, while Branden Lewis, a chef and sustainability professor at Johnson & Wales University, claims English and Portuguese fishermen and sailors invented the roll. The National Geographic article with Lewis's claim also credits Perry's with only the Connecticut style version of the roll.

As far back as 1970, chopped lobster meat heated in drawn butter was served on a hot dog bun at roadside stands such as Red's Eats in Maine. Lobster rolls in the U.S. are associated with the state of Maine, but are also commonly available at seafood restaurants in the other New England states and on Eastern Long Island, where lobster fishing is common.

Lobster rolls in Maine have lobster meat that is usually served cold, rather than warm or hot, and mayonnaise is typically spread inside the bun or tossed with the meat. The hot and buttered version is often referred to as the Connecticut style.

McDonald's restaurants in Canadian provinces, such as Nova Scotia and Ontario, as well as in New England, sometimes offer lobster rolls as a seasonal item in the summer.

In 2016, the Shediac Lobster Festival in New Brunswick overtook the Prince Edward Island Fishermen's Association 75.4 foot record for the longest lobster roll with a 106.3 foot lobster roll. The Prince Edward Island Fishermen's Association took back the record with a 119.8 foot lobster roll. The record was then taken by a restaurant in New Hampshire with a 159.4 foot lobster roll. The Shediac Lobster Festival took the record back in 2017 with a 180 foot lobster roll.

== See also ==
- Cuisine of New England
- List of regional dishes of the United States
- List of sandwiches
- List of seafood dishes
- Fish sandwich
