= Jerrold Speers =

American politician from Maine (born 1941)

Jerrold B. Speers (born 1941) is a Maine politician and lawyer. Speers represented Winthrop, Maine and the surrounding area as Majority Leader of the Maine Senate as well as state treasurer from 1978 to 1980. In 1978, Speers sought the Maine Republican Party's nomination for the gubernatorial election to replace Independent James B. Longley. He ran a low-profile campaign with only one paid staffer and lost to Linwood Palmer. Following the election of Democrat Joseph E. Brennan, the Maine Legislature elected Speers state treasurer.

He attended Phillips Exeter Academy, Colby College and Georgetown University Law Center.

Political offices
Preceded by H. Leighton Cooney, Jr.	Treasurer of Maine; 1978–1980	Succeeded by Samuel Shapiro
