= 2022 Maine gubernatorial election =

- November 8, 2022
- Registered: 1,145,052 (▲8.14 pp)
- Turnout: 59.47% (▼1.77 pp)
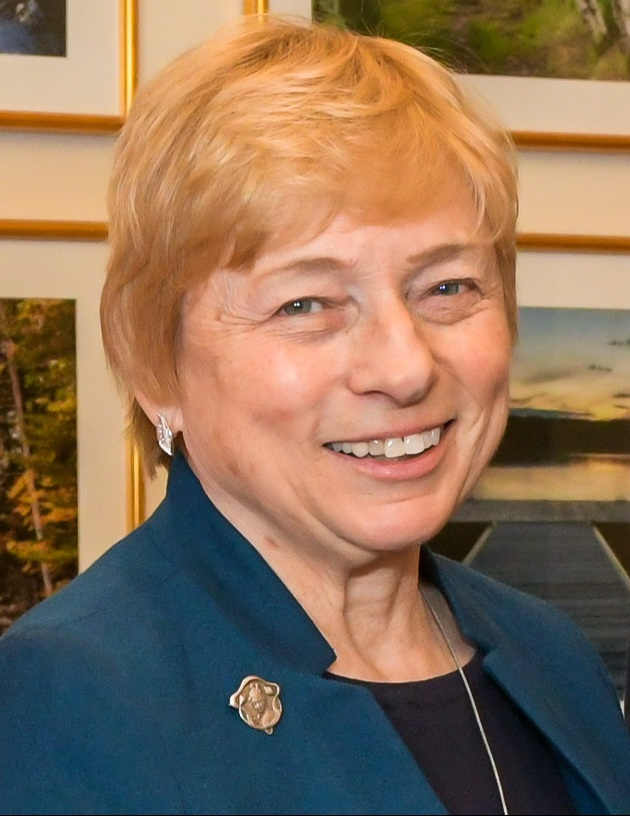

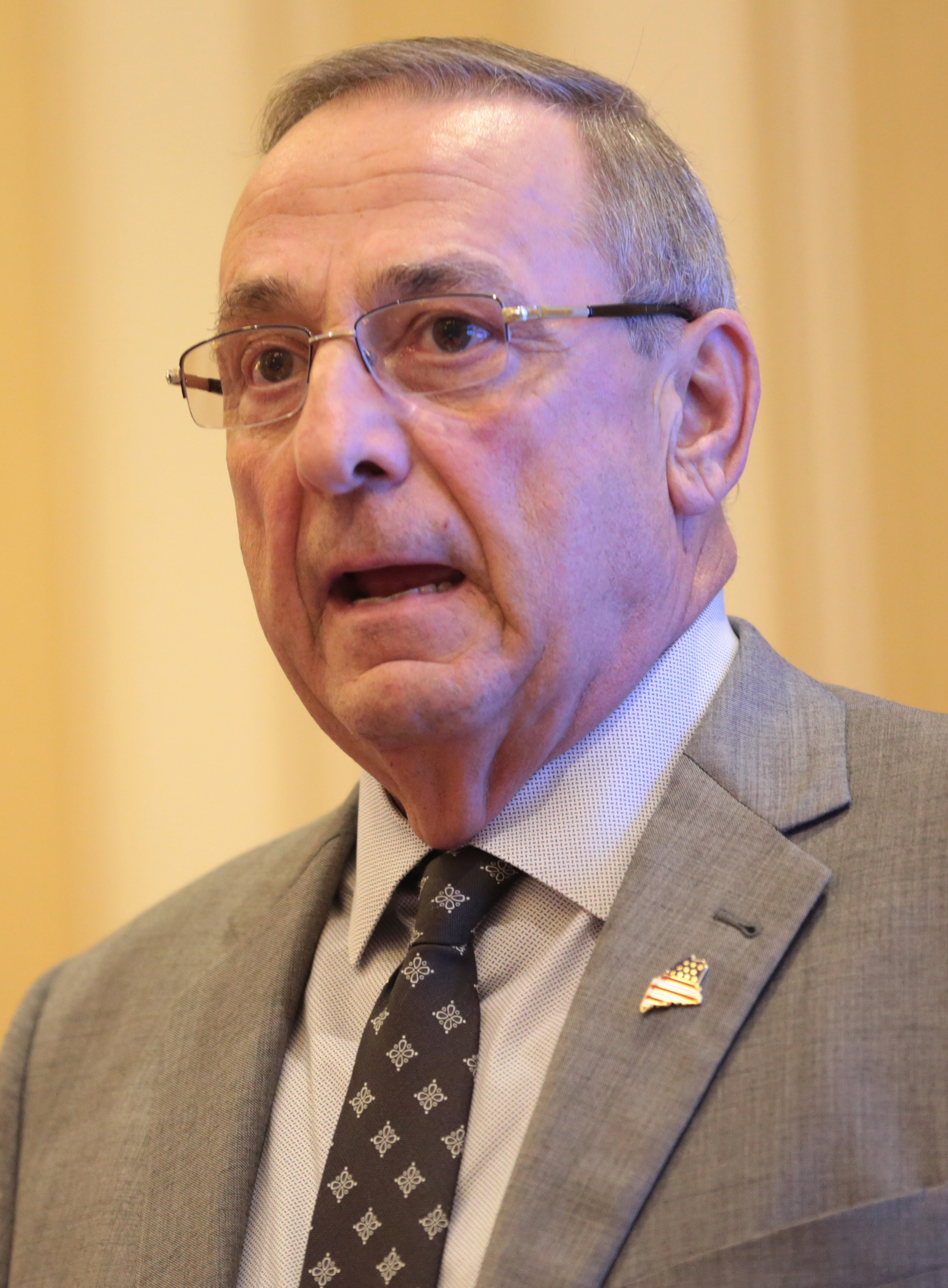
Nominee	Janet Mills	Paul LePage
Party	Democratic	Republican
Popular vote	376,934	287,304
Percentage	55.69%	42.45%
- Mills: 40–50% 50–60% 60–70% 70–80% 80–90% >90% LePage: 40–50% 50–60% 60–70% 70–80% 80–90% >90% Tie: 50%
Governor before election
Janet Mills
Democratic
Elected Governor
Janet Mills
Democratic

The 2022 Maine gubernatorial election took place on November 8, 2022, to elect the governor of Maine. Incumbent Democratic governor Janet Mills won re-election to a second term, defeating Republican nominee and former governor Paul LePage. Neither candidate faced any primary opposition. An independent candidate, Sam Hunkler, received 2% of the vote, the lowest total for a third party or independent gubernatorial candidate in the state since 1982.

This was the first gubernatorial election in Maine since 1990 in which the winner was from the same party as the incumbent president, and the first time since 1978 that it was a Democrat. With nearly 377,000 votes, Mills won more votes than any other gubernatorial candidate in Maine history, breaking her own record set four years earlier. Her 13-point margin of victory was the largest for a statewide Democratic candidate since George J. Mitchell won over 80% of the vote in the 1988 United States Senate election.

Mills's victory was also the largest for any gubernatorial candidate since incumbent independent Angus King won 59% of the vote in 1998.

== Democratic primary ==
=== Candidates ===
==== Nominee ====
- Janet Mills, governor of Maine (2019–present)

==== Failed to qualify for ballot access ====
- John Glowa, wildlife activist

==== Declined ====
- Troy Jackson, President of the Maine Senate (2018–2024) (endorsed Mills)

=== Endorsements ===
Janet Mills

State legislators

- Troy Jackson, President of the Maine Senate (2018–present)

Organizations

- EMILY's List

=== Results ===
Democratic primary results
Party	Candidate	Votes	%
Democratic	Janet Mills (incumbent)	69,422	93.42%
Democratic	Blank ballots	4,889	6.58%
Total votes		74,311	100.0%

== Republican primary ==
=== Candidates ===
==== Nominee ====
- Paul LePage, former governor of Maine (2011–2019)

==== Failed to qualify for ballot access ====
- Michael Heath, activist

==== Filed paperwork ====
- Martin Vachon

=== Endorsements ===
Paul LePage

U.S. senators

- Susan Collins, U.S. senator from Maine (1997–present)

Statewide officials

- Chris Sununu, governor of New Hampshire (2017–2025)

Organizations

- Maine Lodge of the Fraternal Order of Police

=== Results ===
Republican primary results
Party	Candidate	Votes	%
Republican	Paul LePage	59,713	90.91%
Republican	Blank ballots	5,971	9.09%
Total votes		65,684	100.0%

== Independents ==
=== Candidates ===
==== Declared ====
- Sam Hunkler, physician

==== Declined ====
- Thomas Saviello, former state senator (2010–2018)

== General election ==
With no other candidates challenging Mills or LePage in their respective primaries, the campaign started out with most prediction models giving Mills a slight edge over LePage. However, Maine had not elected a governor from the same party as the President since 1990, and some Democrats were afraid that Democratic president Joe Biden's low approval ratings would hurt Mills.

Access to abortion became a crucial issue following the Supreme Court's ruling in Dobbs v. Jackson Women's Health Organization, which overturned Roe v. Wade and eliminated the constitutional right to abortion, effectively returning the issue to the states. Following the leak of the draft opinion, Mills released a statement saying "I do not consider the rights of women to be dispensable. And I pledge that as long as I am governor, I will fight with everything I have to protect reproductive rights and to preserve access to reproductive health care in the face of every and any threat to it – whether from politicians in Augusta or Supreme Court Justices in Washington."

After the release of the draft opinion, LePage stated he supported some abortion restrictions, but pledged to preserve access to abortion in cases of rape, incest and life of the mother. However, this was seen as a reversal over his previous statements, including one in 2016 where he said that "we should not have abortion," and a 2018 statement in support of overturning Roe v. Wade. LePage would continue to struggle with questions on abortion, and a stumble in a debate with Mills on the topic led to national headlines.

Over the course of the campaign, Mills developed a fundraising advantage over LePage, while outside groups unaffiliated with either campaign broke records for spending, mostly on negative ads. Ads supporting Mills's candidacy or opposing LePage's candidacy accounted for over $9 million in spending, while ads supporting LePage or opposing Mills accounted for over $7 million.

Polls released after the primaries showed Mills having a moderate-to-large lead over LePage, with the closest poll showing her ahead by six points.

Mills was declared the winner by the Associated Press shortly before midnight on November 8. LePage did not immediately concede the race, but did concede on November 9 with a written statement. In his election night remarks, LePage concluded that he "missed the message" on abortion. Some observers saw the results as symbolic of the decline of the once-dominant Maine Republican Party, and Maine's movement towards becoming a solid blue state.

In the election, Mills broke her own record set four years earlier for most votes received by a Maine gubernatorial candidate.

=== Predictions ===
Source	Ranking	As of
The Cook Political Report	Lean D	March 4, 2022
Inside Elections	Lean D	July 22, 2022
Sabato's Crystal Ball	Lean D	August 18, 2022
Politico	Lean D	August 12, 2022
RCP	Tossup	January 10, 2022
Fox News	Lean D	October 11, 2022
538	Likely D	September 18, 2022
Elections Daily	Lean D	November 7, 2022

=== Post-primary endorsements ===
Janet Mills (D)

U.S. senators

- Angus King, U.S. senator from Maine (2013–present) (Independent)

Organizations

- AFL–CIO of Maine
- EqualityMaine
- Feminist Majority PAC
- Human Rights Campaign
- League of Conservation Voters Action Fund
- Maine Credit Union League
- Maine Democratic Party
- National Education Association – Maine
- Network for Public Education
- Planned Parenthood
- Rachel's Action Network
- SEIU Local 1989
- Sierra Club – Maine
- Sportsman's Alliance of Maine
- United Auto Workers
- Women's Political Committee

Newspapers

- Bangor Daily News
Paul LePage (R)

Statewide officials

- Ron DeSantis, governor of Florida (2019–present)
- Glenn Youngkin, governor of Virginia (2022–2026)

Organizations

- Maine Association of Builders and Contractors

=== Polling ===
Aggregate polls

Source of poll aggregation	Dates administered	Dates updated	Janet Mills (D)	Paul LePage (R)	Other (Note: Calculated by taking the difference of 100% and all other candidates combined.)	Margin
FiveThirtyEight	May 4 – November 6, 2022	November 6, 2022	50%	43%	7%	Mills +7

Graphical summary

Poll source	Date(s) administered	Sample size (Note: Key: A – all adults RV – registered voters LV – likely voters V – unclear)	Margin of error	Janet Mills (D)	Paul LePage (R)	Other	Undecided
University of New Hampshire	November 2–6, 2022	922 (LV)	± 3.2%	52%	44%	2% (Note: Hunkler (I) with 2%)	2%
SurveyUSA	October 28 – November 2, 2022	1,116 (LV)	± 3.7%	49%	43%	4% (Note: Hunkler (I) with 4%)	5%
Ascend Action	October 26–29, 2022	471 (LV)	± 4.5%	55%	40%	1% (Note: Hunkler (I) with 1%)	4%
Pan Atlantic Research	October 7–15, 2022	400 (LV)	± 3.5%	49%	39%	2% (Note: Hunkler (I) with 2%)	10%
Emerson College	September 19–20, 2022	1,164 (LV)	± 2.8%	53%	41%	2% (Note: Hunkler (I) and "someone else" with 1%)	4%
University of New Hampshire	September 15–19, 2022	694 (LV)	± 3.7%	53%	39%	2% (Note: Hunkler (I) and "Other" with 1%)	5%
Maine People's Resource Center	September 1–9, 2022	814 (RV)	± 3.4%	49%	38%	3%	10%
Fabrizio Ward (R)/Impact Research (D)	May 10–13, 2022	500 (LV)	± 4.4%	51%	46%	–	3%
Pan Atlantic Research	April 21 – May 5, 2022	824 (LV)	± 3.4%	46%	42%	7%	4%
Digital Research Inc.	March 14 – April 7, 2022	622 (RV)	± 3.9%	42%	39%	6% (Note: "Independent candidate" with 6%)	13%
SurveyUSA (D) (Note: Poll sponsored by Swing Hard Turn Left)	August 24–31, 2021	1,242 (RV)	± 3.5%	46%	41%	–	13%
SurveyUSA (Note: Poll sponsored by Our Power Maine)	May 13–19, 2021	514 (RV)	± 5.3%	45%	38%	3% (Note: "Other" with 2%; Michael Barden (G) with 1%)	12%

=== Debates ===
2022 Maine gubernatorial debates
No.	Date	Organizer	Moderator	Location	Link	Democratic	Republican	Independent
P Participant A Absent N Non-invitee I Invitee W Withdrawn								
P Participant A Absent N Non-invitee I Invitee W Withdrawn						Janet Mills	Paul LePage	Sam Hunkler
1	October 4, 2022	Maine Public, Portland Press Herald, Sun Journal	Jennifer Rooks	Lewiston	C-SPAN	P	P	P
2	October 6, 2022	Portland Regional Chamber of Commerce	Quincy Hentzel	Portland	YouTube	P	P	N
3	October 24, 2022	Bangor Daily News, WGME-TV	Gregg Lagerquist	Portland	YouTube	P	P	N
4	October 27, 2022	Maine State Chamber of Commerce, News Center Maine	Pat Callaghan	Portland	YouTube	P	P	N

=== Results ===
2022 Maine gubernatorial election
Party	Candidate	Votes	%	±%
Democratic	Janet Mills (incumbent)	376,934	55.69%	+4.80%
Republican	Paul LePage	287,304	42.45%	−0.73%
Independent	Sam Hunkler	12,581	1.86%	N/A
Total votes		676,819	100.0%	N/A
Turnout			%	
Registered electors				
Democratic hold				

==== By county ====
	Janet Mills (Democratic)		Paul LePage (Republican)		Sam Hunkler (Independent)		Margin		Total
County	Votes	%	Votes	%	Votes	%	Votes	%	Votes
Androscoggin	22,915	48.5%	23,220	49.1%	884	1.9%	-305	-0.6%	47,281
Aroostook	11,587	40.2%	16,530	57.3%	515	1.8%	-4,943	-17.1%	28,844
Cumberland	112,188	68.8%	47,201	29.0%	2,462	1.5%	64,987	39.8%	162,969
Franklin	7,406	49.4%	7,179	47.9%	343	2.3%	227	1.5%	15,001
Hancock	17,446	56.7%	12,527	40.7%	566	1.8%	4,919	16.0%	30,749
Kennebec	30,838	50.8%	28,368	46.7%	1,140	1.9%	2,470	4.1%	60,685
Knox	13,441	60.0%	8,430	37.6%	385	1.7%	5,011	22.3%	22,397
Lincoln	11,853	56.3%	8,744	41.5%	349	1.6%	3,109	14.8%	21,051
Oxford	12,875	46.2%	14,229	51.0%	631	2.3%	-1,354	-4.8%	27,897
Penobscot	31,844	46.2%	35,496	51.5%	1,303	1.9%	-3,652	-5.3%	68,983
Piscataquis	3,098	37.5%	4,960	60.0%	158	1.9%	-1,862	-22.5%	8,266
Sagadahoc	12,414	59.3%	8,049	38.4%	379	1.8%	4,365	11.4%	20,948
Somerset	9,083	39.6%	13,233	57.7%	500	2.2%	-4,510	-18.1%	22,945
Waldo	11,508	54.4%	9,099	43.0%	400	1.9%	2,409	11.4%	21,146
Washington	6,046	40.6%	8,160	54.8%	553	3.7%	-2,114	-14.2%	14,892
York	60,772	57.9%	41,662	39.7%	1,994	1.9%	19,110	18.2%	105,010

==== By congressional district ====
Mills won 1 of 2 congressional districts with LePage winning the remaining one, which elected a Democrat.

District	Mills	LePage	Representative
1st	63%	36%	Chellie Pingree
2nd	48%	50%	Jared Golden

== See also ==
- 2022 United States gubernatorial elections
- 2022 Maine elections

== Notes ==
Partisan clients
