= James Longley =

James Longley is the name of:

- James Longley (filmmaker), American documentary filmmaker
- James B. Longley (1924–1980), governor of Maine
- James B. Longley Jr. (born 1951), former U.S. Congressman from Maine
- James Wilberforce Longley (1849–1922), Canadian journalist, lawyer, politician, and judge
- Jim Longley (born 1958), Australian accountant and politician
