= Georgette Berube =

American politician

Member of the Maine Senate from the Lewiston district
- In office 1984–1996
- Succeeded by: John Jenkins
- In office 1998–2000
- Preceded by: John Jenkins
- Succeeded by: Margaret Rotundo

Personal details
- Born: July 23, 1927 Lewiston, Maine
- Died: February 16, 2005 (aged 77)
- Party: Democratic

Georgette B. Berube (July 23, 1927 – February 16, 2005) was an American politician from Maine. A Democrat, Berube served in the Maine Legislature for 26 years, including terms in both the Maine House of Representatives and the Maine Senate. Berube served in the Maine House from 1970 to 1982 after being elected to represent her hometown of Lewiston. Serving until 1982, Berube then ran in the Democratic primary for Governor of Maine, challenging incumbent Joseph Brennan. She ran as a party outsider. Berube, along with Republican Sherry Huber, lost the primaries but became the first women to run for Governor in Maine. Two years later, she sought and won a seat in the Maine Senate, where she served until 1996. Retiring temporarily in 1996, Berube was re-elected in 1998 and finished her political career in 2000.

== Personal ==
Berube was born of French Canadian parents, Leonard O. Beauparlant and Blanche Tremblay in Lewiston, Maine in 1927. Her parents were small business owners of a furniture store in Lewiston founded in 1919 and was sold in 1975. One of her father's brothers was Aime Majorique Beauparlant, a member of the Canadian parliament. She died on February 16, 2005.

She was married to Gerard Robert Berube who had served with the 4th Infantry Division during World War II. They had two children.

== Political career ==
Berube first ran for office in 1970 for State Representative for one of six at-large seats in Lewiston, Maine. Predominantly a Democratic city, she face opposition from her own party leadership, especially local Democrat and House Appropriations Chairman Louis Jalbert who did not want a woman running for office. Despite this, she finished sixth in the Democratic primary, assuring her a place on the general election ballot. In November, she ranked first among the top six candidates, besting Jalbert by one vote. In 1978, she publicly urged the 2nd District Congressman, Bill Cohen, to run against the sitting Democratic Senator, Bill Hathaway. She continued to serve in the Maine State House of Representatives until 1982 when she ran in the Democratic primary for governor against an incumbent from her own party, Joseph Brennan. She lost by a three to one margin.

In 1984, she challenged the incumbent Democratic State Senator in Lewiston, Carroll Minkowsky, defeating him in the primary and then winning handily in the general election. She served in the state senate until 1996 when she was term limited. After a term out of office, she ran again for the open seat in 1998 when John Jenkins decided not to run for re-election. She won the general election and served one term. With a total of 26 years, she has the most legislative service of any woman in Maine's state legislative history and ranks fourth overall among both men and women.

For many years, she hosted a French radio show in Lewiston and served on the Diocesan Finance Council of the Catholic Diocese of Maine. In 2009 she was posthumously inducted into the Maine Franco-American Hall of Fame.
