= Senator Dutremble =

Senator Dutremble may refer to:

- David Dutremble (fl. 2010s), Maine State Senate
- Dennis L. Dutremble (born 1947), Maine State Senate
