= Helen Longley =

First Lady of Maine
- In role January 2, 1975 – January 3, 1979
- Governor: James B. Longley
- Preceded by: Pauline "Polly" Curtis
- Succeeded by: Constance Brennan

Personal details
- Born: Helen Angela Walsh; April 11, 1922 Springfield, Ohio, U.S.
- Died: September 13, 2005 (aged 83) Portland, Maine, U.S.
- Party: Independent
- Spouse: James B. Longley (m. 1949; died 1980)
- Children: 5, including James Jr.
- Relatives: John Moore (grandson)

Helen Walsh Longley (April 11, 1922 – September 13, 2005) was the former First Lady of Maine from 1975 to 1979, and the wife of the U.S. first independent Governor, James B. Longley. Longley was born Helen Angela Walsh in Springfield, Ohio. She met her future husband, then a cadet in the United States Army Air Corps, in 1943. The couple married in 1949 in Ohio and moved to Lewiston, Maine. They had five children, including former Republican U.S. Representative James B. Longley Jr. (born 1951).

As First Lady, Longley was a proponent of the Special Olympics, as well as state medical facilities, including the Maine Medical Center and Mercy Hospital.

Helen Longley died at Mercy Hospital in Portland, Maine, on September 13, 2005, at the age of 83. She was a resident of Falmouth, Maine, and a former resident of Lewiston.
