= Kenneth Gagnon =

American politician (1958–2026)

Kenneth T. Gagnon

Member of the Maine Senate from the 25th district
- In office 2000–2006
- Preceded by: Richard 'Spike' Carey
- Succeeded by: Lisa Marrache

Personal details
- Born: January 4, 1958
- Died: June 1, 2026 (aged 68)
- Party: Democratic

Kenneth T. Gagnon (January 4, 1958 – June 1, 2026) was an American politician from Maine. He served as a Democratic State Senator from Maine's 25th District, representing much of Kennebec County, including population centers of Waterville and Winslow as well as two communities in Somerset County. Gagnon was first elected to the Maine State Senate in 2000. He also previously served in the Maine House of Representatives from 1996 to 2000 before being elected to the Senate. He also served on the Waterville City Council.

From 2004 to 2006, Gagnon served as Senate Majority Whip.

Gagnon studied at Hamline University. He worked at Colby College. Gagnon died June 1, 2026, at the age of 68.
