= 1978 Maine gubernatorial election =

- November 7, 1978
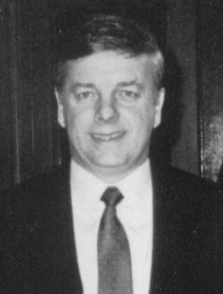

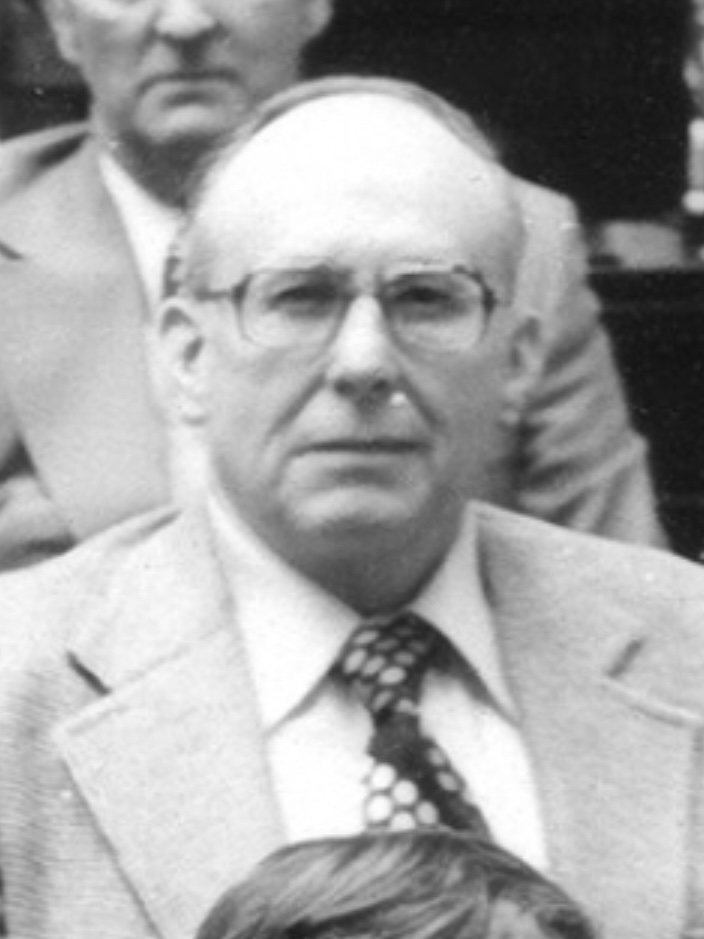

Nominee	Joseph Brennan	Linwood E. Palmer Jr.	Herman C. Frankland
Party	Democratic	Republican	Independent
Popular vote	176,493	126,862	65,889
Percentage	47.80%	34.36%	17.84%
- Brennan: 30–40% 40–50% 50–60% 60–70% 70–80% 80–90% Palmer: 30–40% 40–50% 50–60% 60–70% 70–80% Frankland: 30–40% 40–50% 50–60% 60–70% Tie: 30–40% 40–50%
Governor before election
James B. Longley
Independent
Elected Governor
Joseph Brennan
Democratic

The 1978 Maine gubernatorial election took place in the US state on November 7, 1978. Incumbent Independent Governor James B. Longley chose not to run for re-election, holding himself to the one-term pledge he made when he was elected in 1974. Attorney General Joseph E. Brennan of the Democratic Party defeated both challenger Republican Linwood E. Palmer Jr. and right-wing independent candidate Herman Frankland. Richard Carey unsuccessfully ran for the Democratic nomination, while Charles Cragin unsuccessfully ran for the Republican nomination.

== Democratic primary ==
=== Candidates ===
- Joseph E. Brennan, Maine Attorney General, of Portland
- Richard Carey, state representative, of Waterville
- Philip L. Merrill, state senator, of Portland

=== Results ===
Democratic primary results
Party	Candidate	Votes	%
Democratic	Joseph E. Brennan	38,631	52.19
Democratic	Philip L. Merrill	26,803	36.21
Democratic	Richard Carey	8,588	11.60
Total votes		74,022	100.00

== Republican primary ==
=== Candidates ===
- Charles Cragin, attorney, of Falmouth
- Linwood E. Palmer Jr., state representative, of Nobleboro
- Jerrold Speers, state senator, of Winthrop

=== Results ===
Republican primary results
Party	Candidate	Votes	%
Republican	Linwood E. Palmer Jr.	35,976	48.73
Republican	Charles Cragin	28,244	38.26
Republican	Jerrold Speers	9,603	13.01
Total votes		73,826	100.00

== Results ==
Brennan won much of the state, including the Greater Portland area, the Lewiston–Auburn area, and Bangor, the largest population centers in the state, and performed particularly well in Aroostook County. Palmer did well in the staunchly Republican coastal counties of Lincoln, Waldo, Knox, and Hancock, as well as the lightly-populated inland rural county of Piscataquis. Frankland carried a handful of municipalities in rural Hancock, Washington, Aroostook, Oxford, and Franklin counties.

1978 Gubernatorial Election, Maine
Party	Candidate	Votes	%	±%
Democratic	Joseph Brennan	176,493	47.80%	−
Republican	Linwood E. Palmer Jr.	126,862	34.36%	−
Independent	Herman C. Frankland	65,889	17.84%	−
Majority		49,631	13.44%	
Democratic gain from Independent		Swing		

=== Counties that flipped from Independent to Democratic ===
- Androscoggin (largest city: Lewiston)
- Franklin (largest town: Farmington)
- Kennebec (largest city: Augusta)
- Oxford (largest town: Rumford)
- Penobscot (largest city: Bangor)
- Sagadahoc (largest town: Bath)
- Somerset (largest town: Skowhegan)
- Washington (largest city: Calais)

=== Counties that flipped from Independent to Republican ===
- Hancock (largest municipality: Ellsworth)
- Knox (largest municipality: Rockland)
- Lincoln (largest city: Waldoboro)
- Piscataquis (largest municipality: Dover-Foxcroft)
- Waldo (largest city: Belfast)
