= Attorney General Rowe =

Attorney General Rowe may refer to:

- Colin Rowe (politician) (1911–1970), Attorney-General of South Australia
- G. Steven Rowe (born 1953), Attorney General of Maine
