= James B. Longley Jr. =

American politician, lawyer and United States Marine

Jim Longley
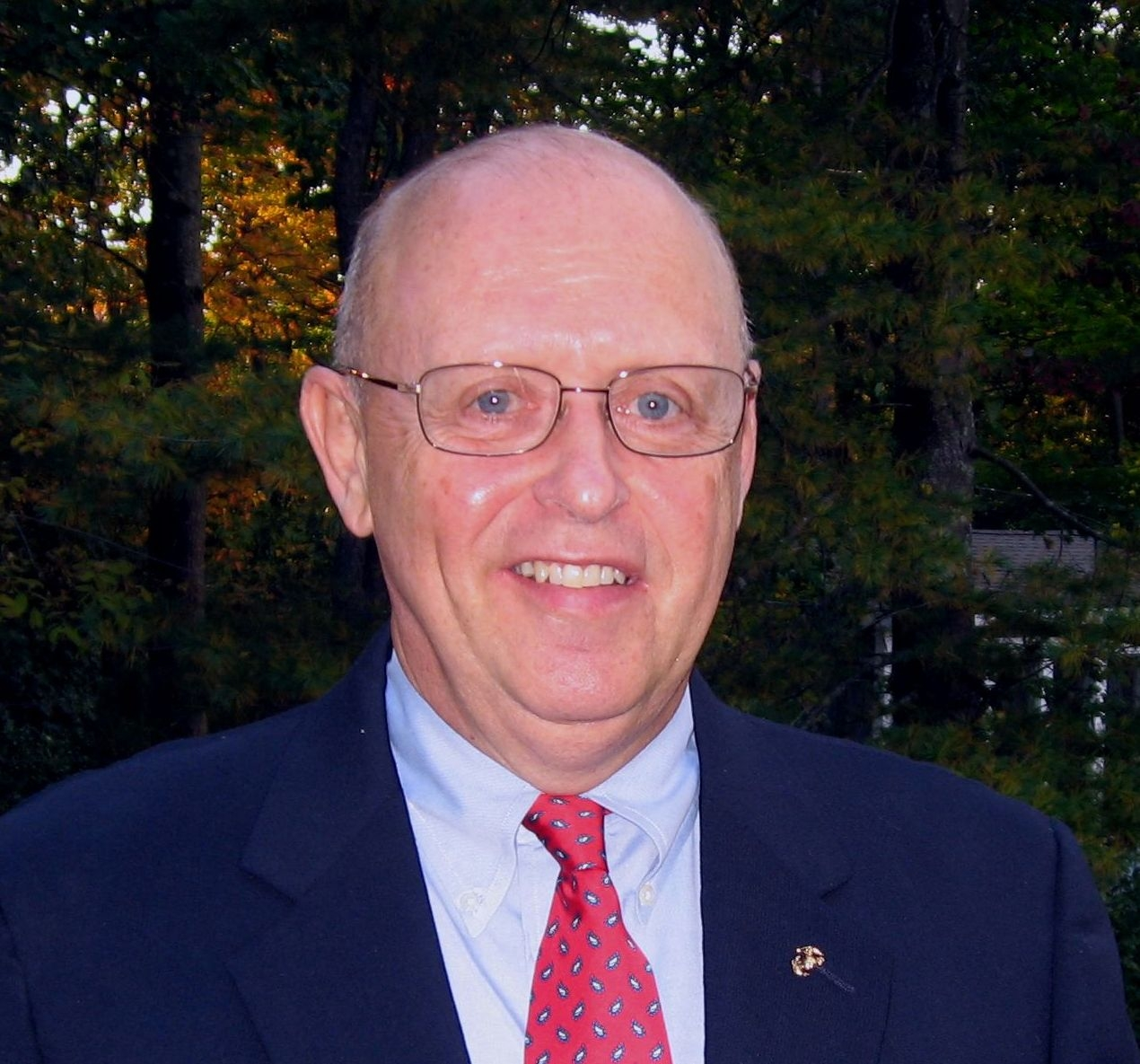

Member of the U.S. House of Representatives from Maine's 1st district
- In office January 3, 1995 – January 3, 1997
- Preceded by: Tom Andrews
- Succeeded by: Tom Allen

Personal details
- Born: James Bernard Longley Jr. July 7, 1951 (age 75) Lewiston, Maine, U.S.
- Party: Republican
- Parent(s): James B. Longley (father); Helen Longley (mother)
- Education: College of the Holy Cross (BA); University of Maine (JD)

James Bernard Longley Jr. (born July 7, 1951) is an American lawyer and politician from Maine. A Republican, he served one term in the United States House of Representatives representing Maine's 1st district from 1995 to 1997, and was the 1998 Republican nominee for Governor of Maine.

== Biography ==
Longley was born in Lewiston, Maine, the son of former Maine governor Jim Longley Sr. and his wife, Helen. He attended Phillips Andover Academy, then graduated from the College of the Holy Cross with a B.A. in history in 1974. He earned his Juris Doctor (J.D.) from the University of Maine School of Law in 1980. He is also a veteran of the United States Marine Corps.

=== Early career ===
Before entering Congress, Longley served as a trial lawyer. He also managed several small businesses near Portland, Maine. In 1994, when Democratic Congressman Thomas Andrews opted to not seek re-election in the 1st District to instead unsuccessfully run for the United States Senate seat being vacated by Democrat George J. Mitchell, Longley ran to succeed him. He faced State Senate President Dennis L. Dutremble, the Democratic nominee, in the general election. Though the Portland-based district had long favored Democratic candidates, Longley narrowly defeated Dutremble as part of the "Republican Revolution."

=== U.S. House of Representatives ===
In one of his first actions in Congress, he offered testimony before a Congressional committee considering a minimum wage increase. In his testimony he presented the concept of cutting taxes paid by minimum wage workers to provide a greater increase in their take home pay. He pointed out that minimum wage increases cause small businesses to not only pay more in wages (hurting the businesses and forcing them in some cases to cut jobs and reduce their workforce to make up for wage increases) but that cutting the payroll taxes would actually increase the employees take home pay by a larger amount than raising the overall minimum wage. Longley noted in his testimony that minimum wage increases cause businesses, as well as employees, to pay more in federal taxes through employee percentage withholding and the business match of payroll taxes. He then accused the Democrats on the committee of only seeking a minimum wage increase to increase tax revenues for the federal government – a backdoor tax increase on American small business, he claimed. Democrats on the committee accused him of wanting to harm his constituents, led by a rant from Congressman Pete Stark, who was gaveled down by the Chairman for being out of order after Stark made reference to how they would use the issue against him in the next election. Longley's idea did not succeed.

He quickly became a prime target of the Democratic Party in 1996, and was challenged by Former Portland Mayor Tom Allen. In the race labor unions and left leaning groups spent millions of dollars in a coordinated effort to defeat him. It was the largest effort of its kind on behalf of a Democratic candidate (or in opposition to an incumbent Republican) within the nation during the 1996 election cycle. Of course, smaller, but similar, sums were spent by business and professional organizations, and right-leaning special interest groups, in a coordinated effort to defend the seat. Longley lost to Allen by a wide margin, and is the last Republican to have represented Maine's 1st congressional district.

=== Campaign for governor ===
In 1998, Longley ran for Governor of Maine. He won the Republican primary against State Representative Henry L. Joy and faced incumbent Governor Angus King, an independent, in the general election, along with attorney Thomas J. Connolly, the Democratic nominee. Longley came in second place and received 19% of the vote.

== Electoral history ==
ELECTORAL HISTORY
Year	Office	Winning Candidate	Party	Pct	Opponent	Party	Pct
1994	U.S. House	James B. Longley, Jr.	Republican	52%	Dennis L. Dutremble	Democrat	48%
1996	U.S. House	Tom Allen	Democrat	55%	James B. Longley, Jr. (inc.)	Republican	45%

U.S. House of Representatives
Preceded by Tom Andrews	Member of the U.S. House of Representatives from Maine's 1st congressional district 1995–1997	Succeeded by Tom Allen
Party political offices
Preceded by Susan Collins	Republican nominee for Governor of Maine; 1998	Succeeded by Peter Cianchette
U.S. order of precedence (ceremonial)
Preceded by Parker Griffith as Former U.S. Representative	Order of precedence of the United States as Former U.S. Representative	Succeeded by Wendell Bailey as Former U.S. Representative
