= 1990 Maine gubernatorial election =

- November 6, 1990
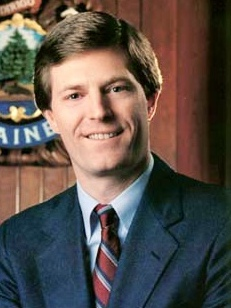

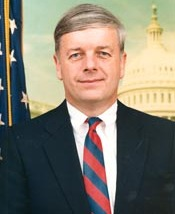

Nominee	John McKernan	Joseph Brennan	Andrew Adam
Party	Republican	Democratic	Independent
Popular vote	243,766	230,038	48,377
Percentage	46.68%	44.05%	9.27%
- McKernan: 40–50% 50–60% 60–70% 70–80% 80–90% >90% Brennan: 40–50% 50–60% 60–70% 70–80% 80–90% >90% Tie: 30–40% 40–50%
Governor before election
John McKernan
Republican
Elected Governor
John McKernan
Republican

The 1990 Maine gubernatorial election took place on November 6, 1990 to elect the governor of Maine. Incumbent Republican governor John McKernan won re-election to a second term, defeating Democratic nominee, former governor and incumbent Congressman Joseph E. Brennan in a tight contest. Independent Andrew Adam took in 9.3% of the vote. Both Brennan and McKernan were unopposed in their respective primaries.

This was the last election until 2010 that Maine elected a Republican governor. This was also the last Maine gubernatorial election until 2022 in which the winner was of the same party as the incumbent president, as well as the most recent Maine gubernatorial election that an incumbent governor won re-election with a smaller margin of victory than in their first election.

== General election ==
=== Candidates ===
- Joseph E. Brennan (Democratic), former governor of Maine and incumbent U.S. Representative from the 1st congressional district
- John McKernan Jr. (Republican), incumbent governor of Maine
- Andrew Adam (independent)

=== Results ===
1990 Maine gubernatorial election results
Party	Candidate	Votes	%	±%
Republican	John McKernan Jr. (incumbent)	243,766	46.68%	−
Democratic	Joseph E. Brennan	230,038	44.05%	−
Independent	Andrew Adam	48,377	9.27%	−
Plurality		13,728	2.63%	
Turnout		522,181		
Republican hold		Swing		

==== Counties that flipped from Republican to Democratic ====
- Cumberland (largest city: Portland)
- Kennebec (largest city: Augusta)
- Oxford (largest town: Rumford)
- Penobscot (largest city: Bangor)
- Somerset (largest town: Skowhegan)
