= 1982 Maine gubernatorial election =

- November 2, 1982
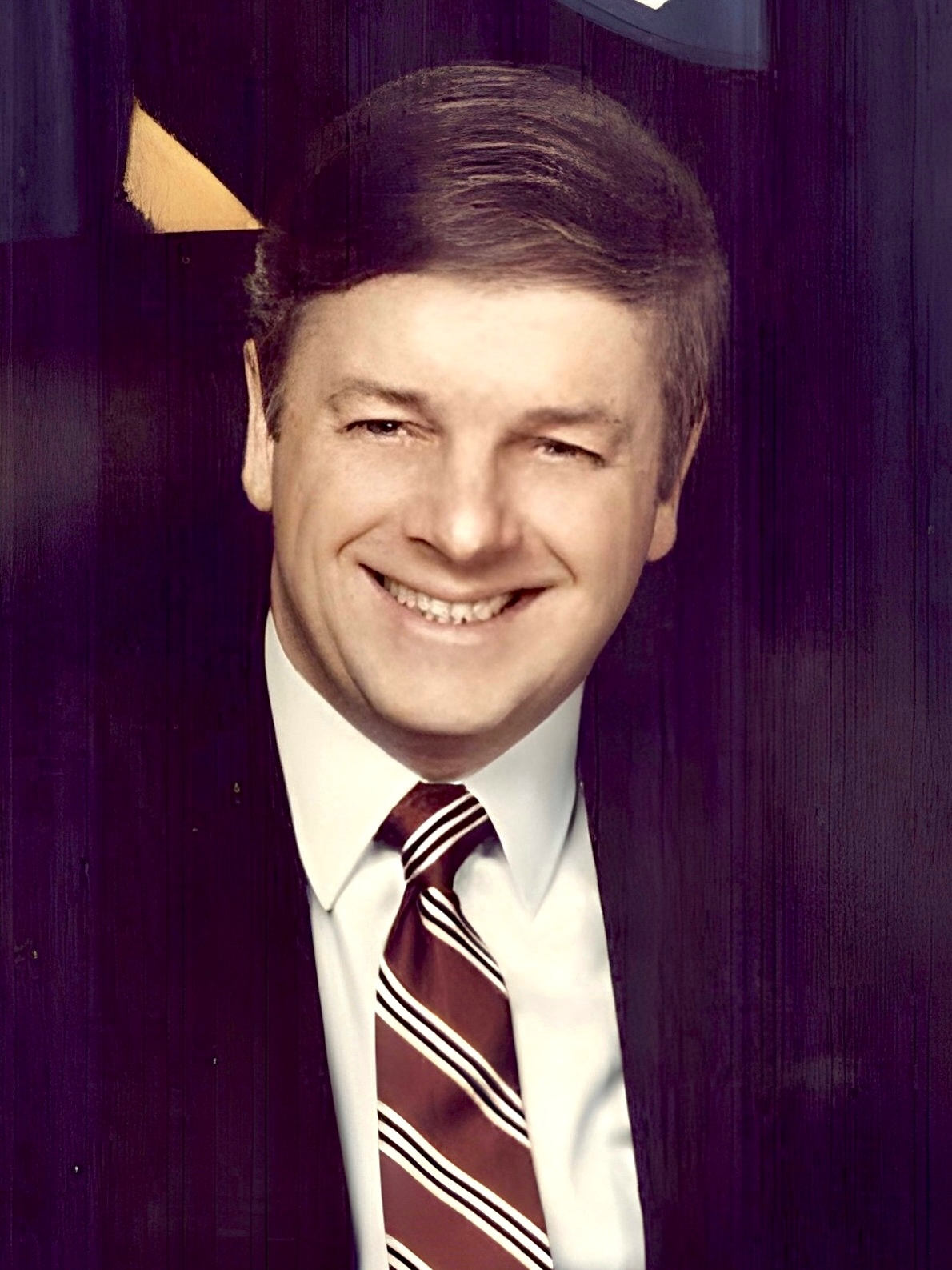

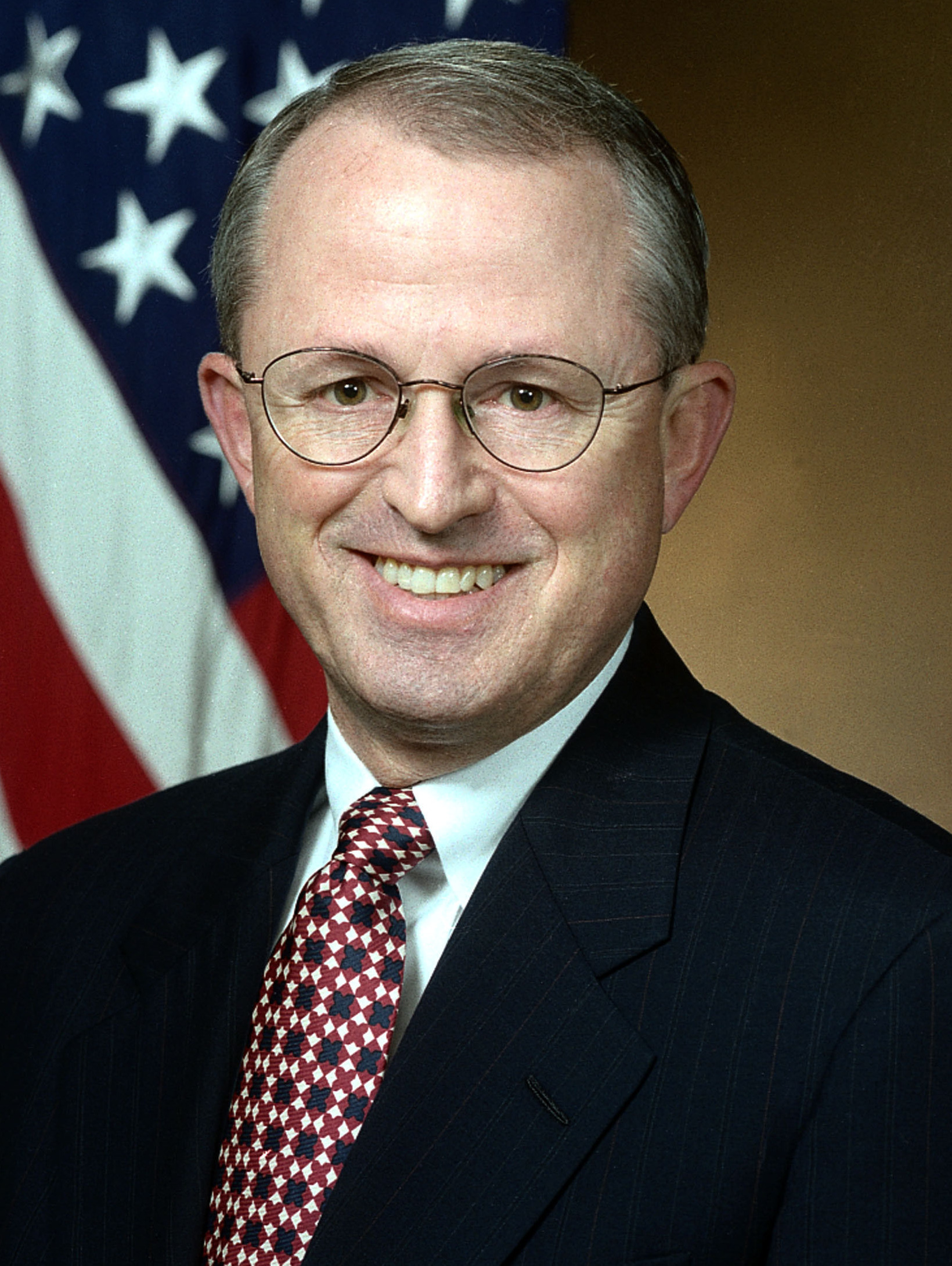
Nominee	Joseph Brennan	Charles Cragin
Party	Democratic	Republican
Popular vote	281,066	172,949
Percentage	61.91%	38.09%
- Brennan: 40–50% 50–60% 60–70% 70–80% 80–90% Cragin: 40–50% 50–60% 60–70% 70–80% 80–90% Tie: 40–50% 50%
Governor before election
Joseph Brennan
Democratic
Elected Governor
Joseph Brennan
Democratic

The 1982 Maine gubernatorial election took place on November 2, 1982. Incumbent Democratic Governor Joseph Brennan defeated Republican challenger Charles R. Cragin. Brennan defeated Cragin, winning his re-election by the highest percent margin in more than thirty years.

Brennan was challenged in the Democratic primary by Lewiston state representative Georgette Berube, but easily dispatched her. Cragin defeated Falmouth State Representative Sherry Huber and Waterville State Senator Richard Pierce in the GOP primary. Berube and Huber were the first women to ever run for governor of Maine.

The 281,066 votes received by Brennan represented the single highest vote total for governor in Maine history, until the election of Governor Paul LePage in 2014. Brennan's coattails allowed Democrats to win the first trifecta in the state since 1913. This was the first time a gubernatorial candidate won a majority of the vote since 1970, and the last time a gubernatorial candidate won a majority of the vote until 1998. This was the only Maine gubernatorial election between 1970 and 2022 that no third-party or independent candidate received at least 5% of the vote.

== Democratic primary ==
=== Candidates ===
- Georgette Berube, member of the State House, of Lewiston
- Joseph E. Brennan, incumbent governor, of Portland

=== Results ===
Democratic primary results
Party	Candidate	Votes	%
Democratic	Joseph E. Brennan	56,990	76.80
Democratic	Georgette Berube	17,219	23.20
Total votes		74,209	100.00

== Republican primary ==
=== Candidates ===
- Charles Cragin, attorney and candidate for governor in 1978, of Falmouth
- Sherry Huber, member of the state house, of Falmouth
- Richard Pierce, member of the state senate, of Waterville

=== Results ===
Republican primary results
Party	Candidate	Votes	%
Republican	Charles Cragin	32,235	38.02
Republican	Sherry Huber	27,739	32.71
Republican	Richard Pierce	24,820	29.27
Total votes		84,794	100.00

== General election results ==
Brennan won reelection in a landslide, carrying all 16 counties with at least 50% of the vote. This was the first election in which a Democrat carried all 16 counties in Maine since the 1964 presidential election, and the first — and to date, only — time in history a Democratic candidate won all 16 counties in a gubernatorial election.

1982 Maine gubernatorial election results
Party	Candidate	Votes	%	±%
Democratic	Joseph Brennan (incumbent)	281,066	61.91%	−
Republican	Charles Cragin	172,949	38.09%	−
Majority		108,117	23.81%	
Democratic hold		Swing		

=== Counties that flipped from Republican to Democratic ===
- Hancock (largest municipality: Ellsworth)
- Knox (largest municipality: Rockland)
- Lincoln (largest city: Waldoboro)
- Piscataquis (largest municipality: Dover-Foxcroft)
- Waldo (largest city: Belfast)
