= Verrill (law firm) =

New England regional law firm

Verrill Dana LLP

- Verrill's headquarters in Portland, Maine
- Type: Limited liability partnership
- Industry: Law
- Founded: 1862; 164 years ago
- Founder: Byron Decreny Verrill
- Headquarters: Portland, Maine, United States
- Number of locations: 9 offices (2026)
- Services: Corporate Law, Commercial Litigation, Real Estate, Trusts & Estates
- Number of employees: 300+, including 180+ attorneys (2026)
- Website: verrill-law.com

Verrill (officially Verrill Dana LLP) is a New England regional law firm. Founded in 1862 by Byron Decreny Verrill, the firm is headquartered in Portland, Maine. The firm has offices in Connecticut, Maine, Massachusetts, New York, and Washington D.C. It has more than 180 lawyers in nine regional offices.

== History ==
Verrill was founded in 1862, and has become one of the few Maine-based law firms with satellite offices around the Northeastern United States. The firm specializes in business law/M&A, health care, litigation and trial, real estate law, labor law and employment law, employee benefits and executive compensation, tax law, private equity, intellectual property and privacy, promotions, energy, environmental law, estate planning and family law, among others.

In 2007, real estate partner and department head John D. Duncan resigned from Verrill Dana effective the end of the year but was fired prematurely after he was implicated with the theft of more than $480,000 from clients and the firm itself. In July 2008 he was disbarred for life. In September 2008 Duncan was sentenced to 28 months in federal prison for tax evasion and theft. In May 2010 the Maine Board of Bar Overseers brought ethics charges against Verrill Dana for neglect of duty in protecting their clients. In 2011, the Maine High Court denied the neglect of duty charges, but ruled that that then-managing partner David Warren and five executive committee members at Verrill Dana had violated ethics rules by not closely monitoring Duncan after problems were first noticed in one client account.

In August 2013, Verrill Dana announced a merger with the trial boutique firm Friedman Gaythwaite Wolf, LLP. In 2015, Verrill Dana announced its combination with Levett Rockwood, a 19-attorney firm in Westport.

In August 2019, Verrill Dana rebranded to Verrill and launched a new website and new logo. However, the official name remained Verrill Dana LLP.

In January 2022, Verrill combined with Boston-based law firm, Rackemann, Sawyer, & Brewster. The newly combined firm continues to operate as Verrill. With the combination, Verrill’s Boston office nearly doubled in headcount to approximately 60 lawyers.

== Notable attorneys ==
- Charles Cragin - attorney, nominee for governor of Maine, acting U.S. Under Secretary of Defense for Personnel and Readiness
- Barbara Merrill - elected to the Maine legislature, she ran for Governor of Maine.
- Alan Nevas - judge of the United States District Court for the District of Connecticut.
- G. Steven Rowe - served with firm from 2009-2012, and ran for Governor of Maine in the 2010 election. He served as Maine Attorney General from 2001 to 2009 and as a member of the Maine House of Representatives from 1992 to 2000.
- Michael Saxl - a firm lawyer and Maine Speaker of the House from 2001-2002, and Principal of Maine Street Solutions - Verrill Dana's public affairs and consulting affiliate
- Frank M. Coffin - served as a partner and is now recognized for his work by the firm in the form of the Frank M. Coffin Fellowship in Family Law
- Howard H. Dana - served among the Justices of the Maine Supreme Judicial Court from 1993 - 2007
- Robert Hirshon - a current firm attorney and a former President of the American Bar Association.
