= 1998 Maine gubernatorial election =

- November 3, 1998
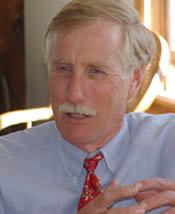

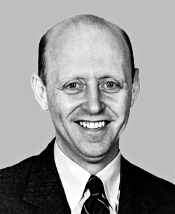

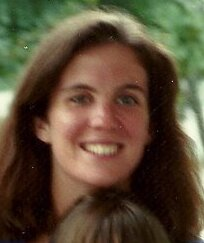
| Nominee | Angus King | James B. Longley Jr. |
| Party | Independent | Republican |
| Popular vote | 246,772 | 79,716 |
| Percentage | 58.61% | 18.93% |
| Nominee | Tom Connolly | Pat LaMarche |
| Party | Democratic | Green |
| Popular vote | 50,506 | 28,722 |
| Percentage | 12.00% | 6.82% |
- King: 30–40% 40–50% 50–60% 60–70% Longley: 30–40% 40–50% 50–60% >90% Connolly: 50–60% Clarke: 30–40% Tie: 40–50% 50%
Governor before election
Angus King
Independent
Elected Governor
Angus King
Independent

The 1998 Maine gubernatorial election took place on November 3, 1998 to elect the governor of Maine. Incumbent Angus King was re-elected to a second term in office in a landslide against James B. Longley Jr., Thomas J. Connolly, and Pat LaMarche.

This election was the first since 1982 in which the winning candidate received greater than 50 percent of the popular vote and the last such election until 2018. As of 2026, this is the most recent election in which Maine elected an independent governor and in which any candidate won every county in the state.

== Democratic primary ==
=== Candidates ===
- Thomas J. Connolly, attorney and activist
- Joseph Ricci, founder of the Élan School and owner of Scarborough Downs

=== Results ===
Democratic primary results
| Party | Candidate | Votes | % |
|---|---|---|---|
| Democratic | Thomas J. Connolly | 36,954 | 81.72 |
| Democratic | Joseph Ricci | 8,264 | 18.28 |
| Total votes | | 45,218 | 100.00 |

== Republican primary ==
=== Candidates ===
- Henry L. Joy, state representative from Crystal
- James B. Longley Jr., former U.S. representative from Falmouth and son of former governor James B. Longley
- Leo G. Martin

=== Results ===
Republican primary results
| Party | Candidate | Votes | % |
|---|---|---|---|
| Republican | James B. Longley, Jr. | 38,192 | 66.04 |
| Republican | Henry L. Joy | 11,411 | 19.73 |
| Republican | Leo G. Martin | 8,229 | 14.23 |
| Total votes | | 57,832 | 100.00 |

== General election ==
=== Candidates ===
- William P. Clarke Jr. (Constitution)
- Thomas J. Connolly, attorney and activist (Democratic)
- Angus King, incumbent governor of Maine since 1995 (Independent)
- Pat LaMarche, activist (Green)
- James B. Longley Jr., former U.S. representative from Falmouth and son of former governor James B. Longley (Republican)

=== Campaign ===
Connolly was inspired to run following King's handling of the January 1998 North American ice storm, which hit Maine particularly hard, while Longley criticized Maine's tax burden and echoed the Republican line that King was a "Democrat in disguise."

=== Endorsements ===
Tom Connolly

Individuals

- Joseph E. Brennan, former governor of Maine (1979–87) and U.S. representative (1987–91)
- George J. Mitchell, former U.S. senator from Maine (1980–95) and Senate majority leader (1989–95)

Organizations

- Maine AFL-CIO

Publications

- Casco Bay Weekly
Angus King

Individuals

- Kenneth M. Curtis, former governor of Maine (1967–75) (Democratic)

Organizations

- Maine Education Association
- Sportsman's Alliance of Maine
Jim Longley

Individuals

- Jock McKernan, former governor of Maine (1987–95) and former U.S. representative (1983–87)
- Olympia Snowe, U.S. senator from Maine since 1995 and former U.S. representative (1979–95)
Pat LaMarche

Individuals

- Jonathan Carter, scientist and 1994 Green nominee for governor

Organizations

- Maine National Organization for Women

=== Polling ===
| Poll source | Date(s) administered | Sample size (Note: Key: A – all adults RV – registered voters LV – likely voters V – unclear) | Margin of error | Angus King (I) | James Longley Jr. (R) | Thomas Connolly (D) | Other / undecided (Note: Calculated by taking the difference of 100% and all other candidates combined. The dataset reports only two candidates, so support for all other candidates is included in this column.) |
|---|---|---|---|---|---|---|---|
| SurveyUSA | October 31, 1998 | 500 | — | 59% | 18% | — | 23% |
| Strategic Marketing Services | October 6–11, 1998 | 400 (LV) | ± 4.9% | 60% | 13% | 6% | 21% |

=== Results ===
County Flips: Independent Flip from Democratic/Republican Hold

King won in a landslide, carrying all sixteen counties and nearly every municipality. Longley did carry 22 municipalities in rural northern and eastern Maine and tied King in two other municipalities. Connolly won only the Passamaquoddy Indian Township Reservation, though he did tie King in the small town of Beddington (at four votes apiece). Clarke carried the town of Talmadge, eight votes to seven for King. Despite getting nearly twice the votes of Clarke, LaMarche failed to carry any municipalities, though she tied King in Allagash and finished second in Jackson.

Maine gubernatorial election, 1998
| Party | Candidate | Votes | % | ±% |
|---|---|---|---|---|
| Independent | Angus King (incumbent) | 246,772 | 58.61% | +23.25% |
| Republican | James B. Longley Jr. | 79,716 | 18.93% | −4.14% |
| Democratic | Thomas J. Connolly | 50,506 | 12.00% | −21.83% |
| Green | Pat LaMarche | 28,722 | 6.82% | +0.43% |
| Constitution | William P. Clarke Jr. | 15,293 | 3.63% | N/A |
| Majority | | 167,056 | 39.68% | +38.14% |
| Turnout | | 421,009 | | |
| Independent hold | | Swing | | |

==== By county ====
| County | Angus King Independent | | James B. Longley Jr. Republican | | Thomas Connolly Democratic | | Patricia LaMarche Green | | William P. Clarke Jr. Constitution | | Margin | | Total votes |
| County | # | % | # | % | # | % | # | % | # | % | # | % | Total votes |
|---|---|---|---|---|---|---|---|---|---|---|---|---|---|
| Androscoggin | 20,036 | 62.4% | 5,248 | 16.3% | 3,939 | 12.3% | 1,399 | 4.4% | 1,512 | 4.7% | 14,788 | 46.1% | 32,134 |
| Aroostook | 11,609 | 51.3% | 5,274 | 23.3% | 3,090 | 13.7% | 1,543 | 6.8% | 1,100 | 4.9% | 6,335 | 28.0% | 22,616 |
| Cumberland | 59,664 | 61.6% | 16,583 | 17.1% | 13,222 | 13.7% | 5,555 | 5.7% | 1,798 | 1.9% | 43,081 | 44.5% | 96,822 |
| Franklin | 6,211 | 61.4% | 1,686 | 16.7% | 1,316 | 13.0% | 589 | 5.8% | 306 | 3.0% | 4,525 | 44.7% | 10,108 |
| Hancock | 9,666 | 53.5% | 3,646 | 20.2% | 1,532 | 8.5% | 2,408 | 13.3% | 823 | 4.6% | 6,020 | 23.3% | 18,075 |
| Kennebec | 22,221 | 59.1% | 6,349 | 16.9% | 46,90 | 12.5% | 2,802 | 7.5% | 1,529 | 4.1% | 15,872 | 42.2% | 37,591 |
| Knox | 8,301 | 60.7% | 2,548 | 18.6% | 1,174 | 8.6% | 1,163 | 8.5% | 487 | 3.6% | 5,753 | 42.1% | 13,673 |
| Lincoln | 8,627 | 62.1% | 2,672 | 19.2% | 1,205 | 8.7% | 994 | 7.2% | 388 | 2.8% | 5,955 | 42.9% | 13,886 |
| Oxford | 10,818 | 62.9% | 2,843 | 16.5% | 2,047 | 11.9% | 815 | 4.7% | 676 | 3.9% | 7,975 | 46.4% | 17,199 |
| Penobscot | 23,107 | 50.1% | 10,863 | 23.5% | 5,486 | 11.9% | 4,173 | 9.0% | 2,516 | 5.5% | 12,244 | 26.6% | 46,145 |
| Piscataquis | 3,313 | 50.2% | 1,752 | 26.6% | 708 | 10.7% | 446 | 6.8% | 378 | 5.7% | 1,561 | 23.6% | 6,597 |
| Sagadahoc | 7,807 | 64.4% | 1,979 | 16.3% | 1,148 | 9.5% | 821 | 6.8% | 367 | 3.0% | 5,828 | 48.1% | 12,122 |
| Somerset | 8,596 | 54.0% | 3,534 | 22.2% | 1,845 | 11.6% | 1,208 | 7.6% | 729 | 4.6% | 5,062 | 31.8% | 15,912 |
| Waldo | 5,954 | 51.2% | 2,468 | 21.2% | 1,090 | 9.4% | 1,444 | 12.4% | 677 | 5.8% | 3,486 | 30.0% | 11,633 |
| Washington | 4,926 | 44.9% | 2,909 | 26.5% | 1,416 | 12.9% | 999 | 9.1% | 714 | 6.5% | 2,017 | 18.4% | 10,964 |
| York | 35,916 | 64.7% | 9,362 | 16.9% | 6,598 | 11.9% | 2,363 | 4.3% | 1,293 | 2.3% | 26,554 | 47.8% | 55,532 |
| Totals | 246,772 | 58.6% | 79,716 | 18.9% | 50,506 | 12.0% | 28,722 | 6.8% | 15,293 | 3.6% | 167,056 | 39.7% | 421,009 |

Counties that flipped from Democratic to Independent

- Kennebec (largest city: Augusta)
- Somerset (largest town: Skowhegan)
- York (largest town: Biddeford)

Counties that flipped from Republican to Independent

- Aroostook (largest city: Presque Isle)
- Hancock (largest town: Ellsworth)
- Penobscot (largest city: Bangor)
- Piscataquis (largest municipality: Dover-Foxcroft)
- Washington (largest city: Calais)
