= Maine Democratic Party =

Maine affiliate of the Democratic Party

- Chairperson: Charlie Dingman
- Governor: Janet Mills
- Senate President: Mattie Daughtry
- House Speaker: Ryan Fecteau
- Headquarters: Augusta, Maine
- Membership (2026): ▼306,875
- National affiliation: Democratic Party
- Colors: Blue
- U.S. Senate (Maine seats): 0 / 2
- U.S. House (Maine seats): 2 / 2
- Seats in the Maine Senate: 20 / 35
- Seats in the Maine House: 75 / 151
- Nonvoting seats in the Maine House: 1 / 3
- Executive offices (Note: Governor, Attorney General, Secretary of State, Treasurer. Only the governor is elected by popular vote, the other three offices are filled by the Maine Legislature.): 4 / 4

Election symbol

Website
- www.mainedems.org

The Maine Democratic Party is the affiliate of the Democratic Party in the U.S. state of Maine.

After the Civil War, Democrats were a minor player in a political scene dominated by the Republican Party. However, during the 1950s, Edmund Muskie led an expansive political insurgency culminating in his election as Governor of Maine and successive Democratic elections to both state and national offices.

It is currently the state's favored party, controlling both houses of the state legislature, governorship, and both of Maine's U.S. House seats. One of Maine's U.S. Senate seats is currently held by Angus King, an independent who caucuses with the Democrats.

== Current Democratic officeholders ==
=== Members of Congress ===
==== U.S. Senate ====
- None

Maine's U.S. Senate Class I seat has been held by Independent Angus King since 2012 (though King does caucus with the Senate Democrats) while the Class II seat has been held by Republican Susan Collins since 1996. Senate Majority Leader George J. Mitchell was the last Democrat to represent Maine in the U.S. Senate, leaving office at the conclusion of his term on January 3, 1995. Mitchell had been appointed to the seat in May 1980 to fill the vacancy left by Edmund Muskie after Muskie's appointment as the U.S. Secretary of State. Mitchell was subsequently elected to a full term in 1982. After winning a second term in 1988, Mitchell opted to retire instead of seeking a third term. Congressman Thomas Andrews ran as the Democratic nominee in the 1994 election and was subsequently defeated by Republican challenger Olympia Snowe.

Troy Jackson won the seat held by Collins in the 2026 election.

==== U.S. House of Representatives ====
Out of the 2 seats Maine is apportioned in the U.S. House of Representatives, both are held by Democrats:

| District | Member | Photo |
|---|---|---|
| 1st | Chellie Pingree | |
| 2nd | Jared Golden | |

=== Statewide officials ===
Democrats control the Governor's office, as well as the three statewide offices filled by the Maine Legislature:

Hannah Pingree was elected governor in the 2026 election.

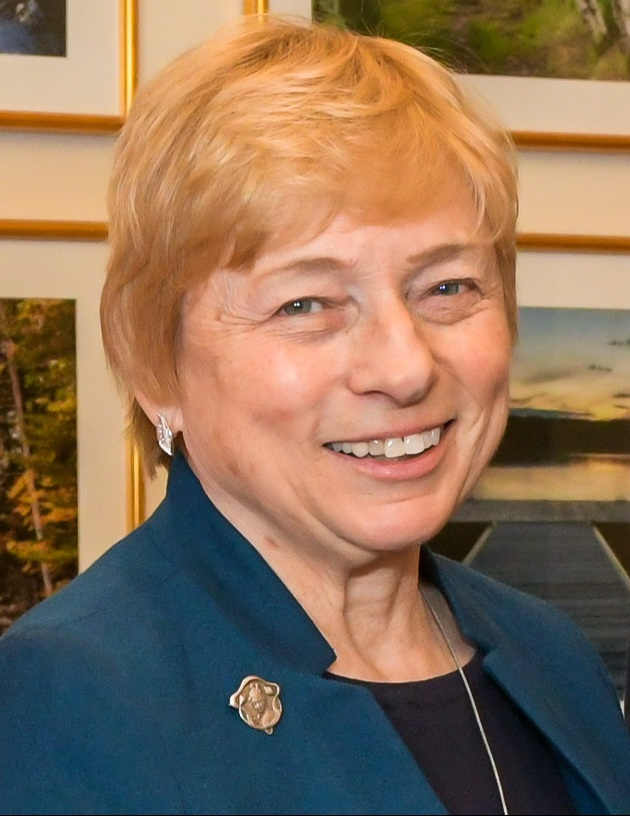
Governor Janet Mills

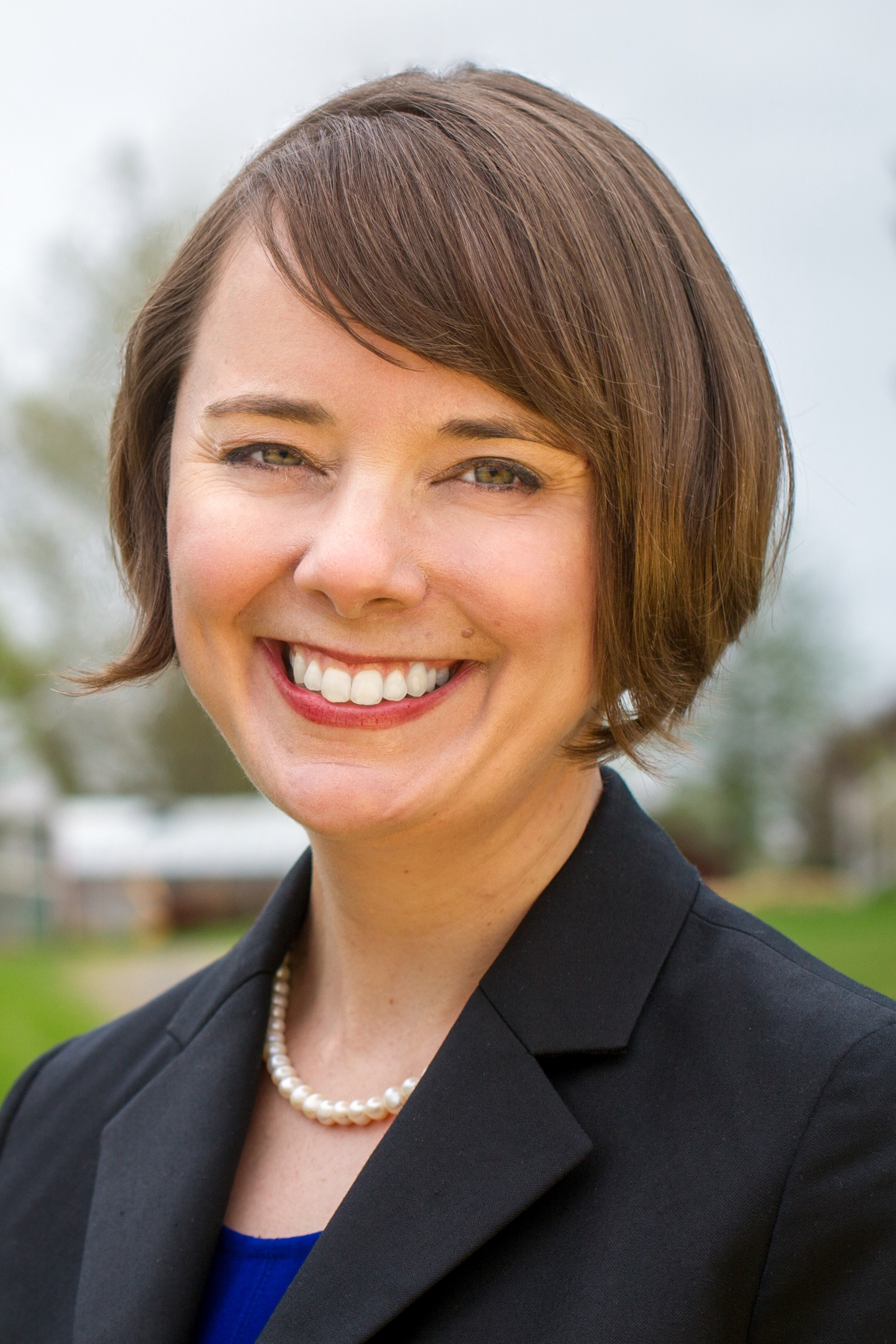
Secretary of State Shenna Bellows
- Attorney General: Aaron Frey
- State Treasurer: Joe Perry

=== State legislative leaders ===
Democrats have controlled the Maine House of Representatives since 2012, and the Maine Senate since 2018. Democrats won a Senate supermajority of 24 seats in the 2026 election.

As Maine has no office of lieutenant governor, the Senate President is first in line to become governor in the event of a vacancy.

- Senate President: Mattie Daughtry
  - Senate Majority Leader: Teresa Pierce
  - Assistant Senate Majority Leader: Jill Duson
- House Speaker: Ryan Fecteau
  - House Majority Leader: Matt Moonen
  - House Majority Whip: Lori Gramlich

=== Mayors ===
- Portland: Mark Dion
- Lewiston: Carl Sheline

== History ==
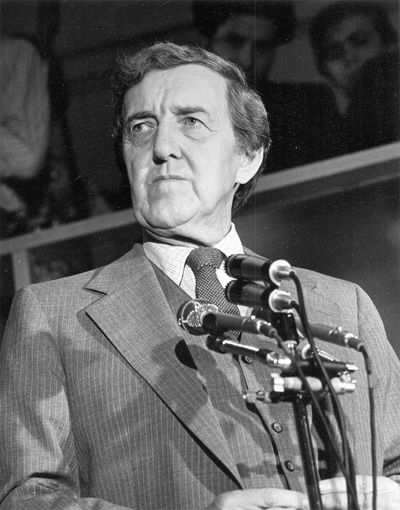
The Maine Democratic Party was revitalized by Edmund Muskie during the 1950s and 1960s. Muskie served as governor, senator and finally secretary of state under President Jimmy Carter.

The Democratic Party has history dating back to the 1800s. Maine entered the Union in 1820 as an Anti-Federalist state. Soon after, in 1834, the Anti-Federalists adopted the Democratic Party name.

The Democrats had limited success for nearly a hundred years, in part due to slavery. The Northeast was predominantly anti-slavery whereas the South was pro-slavery. When the Whig Party split in 1856, most of its northern wing formed the Republican Party, which dominated Maine due to its anti-slavery stance. Maine was predominantly Republican until 1954. Between 1855 and 1955, only five Democrats — Samuel Wells (1855–1856), Alonzo Garcelon (1878–1879), Frederick W. Plaisted (1911–1913), Oakley C. Curtis (1915–1917), and Louis J. Brann (1933–1937) — served as governor of Maine, and in that same time only two Democrats — Charles F. Johnson and Obadiah Gardner — represented Maine in the United States Senate.

In the 1954 Maine gubernatorial election, Democratic state representative Edmund Muskie became only the fourth Democrat to win the governorship in the 20th century. He won the state over in part due to his stance on economic growth through industrial development, accessible politics on television and being acceptable to diverse population growth. Muskie was re-elected in 1956 and elected to the U.S. Senate in 1958, the first Democrat to be popularly elected to the U.S. Senate in Maine history.

Between 1954 and 1974, the number of registered Democrats more than doubled from 99,000 to 212,000.

In more recent years, Maine has been roughly evenly split between Democrats, Republicans, and independents. For instance in 1990, independent registered voters constituted 37% of the electorate, Democrats 33%, and Republicans 30%. This is a stark contrast to the first hundred years of Maine politics.

From 2012 to 2019, despite having a Republican governor in Paul LePage, the party remained strong, holding key offices in the state government and the U.S. Congress and maintaining a majority in the Maine House of Representatives for six of LePage's eight years in office.

Democrat Janet Mills was elected Governor of Maine in the 2018 gubernatorial election, and was re-elected in 2022. Hannah Pingree was elected governor in 2026, becoming the first Maine gubernatorial candidate to succeed an outgoing governor of the same party since 1952. Democrats have held a government trifecta in Maine since the 2018 election.

== Party platform ==
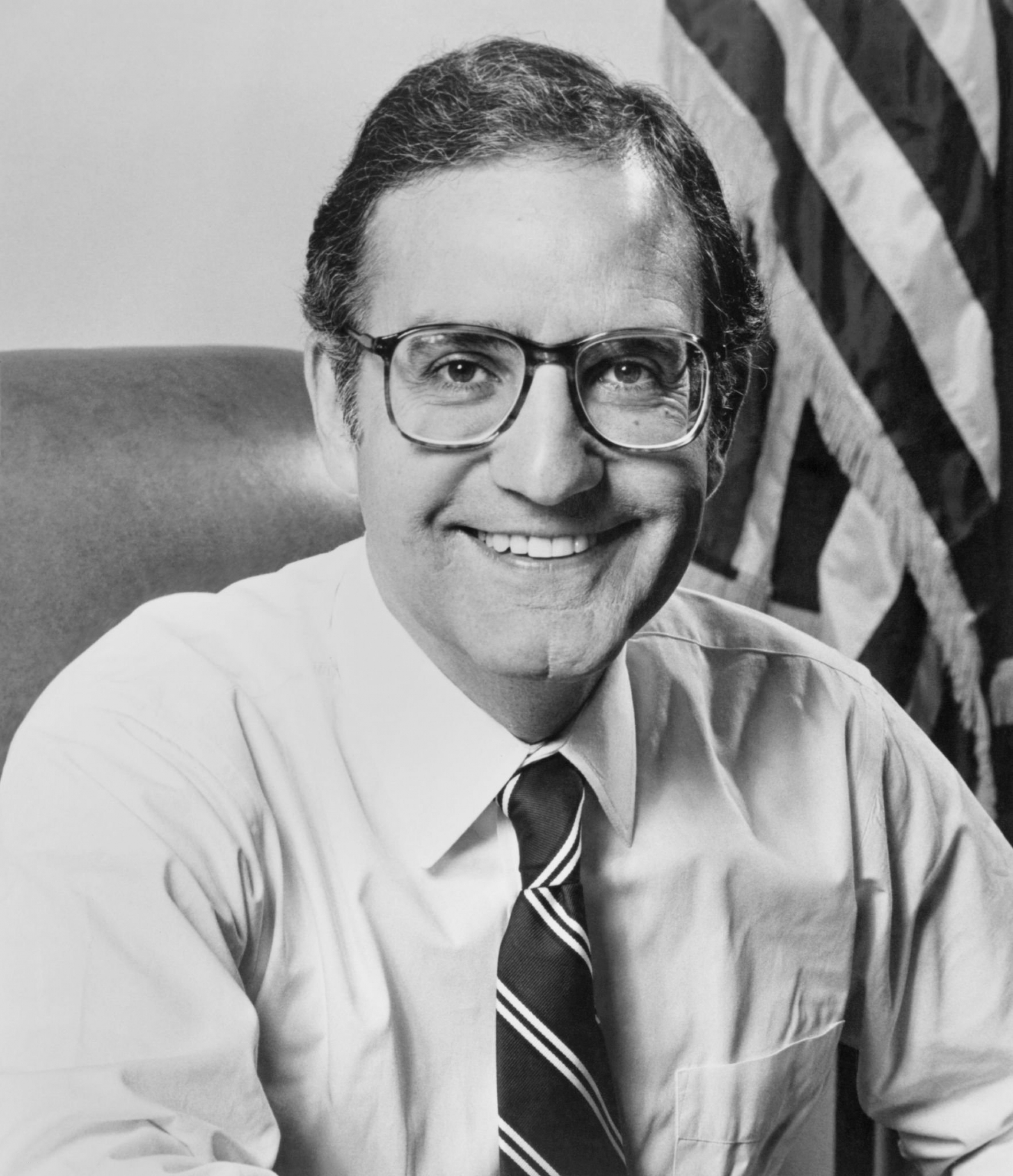
George J. Mitchell, Senate Majority leader (1989–1995)

Maine Democrats promote economic opportunity, ethical government, freedom, safety, and national security. They also promote voting rights, environmental protection, strong public education, access to health care, civil rights, transportation infrastructure, and help for those in serious poverty.

The party advocates economic security through strong support of Social Security, Medicare, and Medicaid.

Maine Democrats believe in fair workplace opportunities and support Maine workers' right to form unions through the Employee Free Choice Act, which gives employees the chance to strike without being punished by employers and also keeps the workplace free of hazards, harassment, and discrimination.

The platform also supports environmental protection through an energy plan to curb pollution and increase productivity.

== Election results ==
=== Federal ===
==== U.S. House ====
| Election | Votes | % | Seats (ME) | ± | % |
|---|---|---|---|---|---|
| 2016 | 386,627 | 51.93 | 1 / 2 | 0 | 0.40 |
| 2018 | 343,635 | 55.12 | 2 / 2 | ▲1 | 3.19 |
| 2020 | 468,978 | 57.95 | 2 / 2 | 0 | 2.83 |
| 2022 | 379,824 | 57.99 | 2 / 2 | 0 | 0.04 |
| 2024 | 446,949 | 54.70 | 2 / 2 | 0 | 3.29 |
| 2026 | 415,884 | 58.05 | 1 / 2 | ▼1 | 3.35 |

=== State ===
==== Executive offices ====
Governor
| Election | Candidate | Votes | % | Result |
|---|---|---|---|---|
| 1974 | George J. Mitchell | 132,219 | 36.84% | Lost ✗ |
| 1978 | Joseph E. Brennan | 176,493 | 47.80% | Won ✓ |
| 1982 | Joseph E. Brennan | 281,066 | 61.91% | Won ✓ |
| 1986 | James Tierney | 128,744 | 30.16% | Lost ✗ |
| 1990 | Joseph E. Brennan | 230,038 | 44.05% | Lost ✗ |
| 1994 | Joseph E. Brennan | 172,951 | 33.83% | Lost ✗ |
| 1998 | Thomas J. Connolly | 50,506 | 12.20% | Lost ✗ |
| 2002 | John Baldacci | 238,179 | 47.15% | Won ✓ |
| 2006 | John Baldacci | 209,927 | 38.11% | Won ✓ |
| 2010 | Libby Mitchell | 109,387 | 18.84% | Lost ✗ |
| 2014 | Mike Michaud | 265,125 | 43.37% | Lost ✗ |
| 2018 | Janet Mills | 320,962 | 50.89% | Won ✓ |
| 2022 | Janet Mills | 376,934 | 55.69% | Won ✓ |
| 2026 | Hannah Pingree | 388,721 | 54.44% | Won ✓ |

== See also ==
- Political party strength in Maine
