= John Jenkins (American politician) =

American politician (1952–2020)

Mayor of Auburn
- In office January 6, 2007 – January 1, 2009
- Preceded by: Normand Guay
- Succeeded by: Dick Gleason

Member of the Maine Senate from the 21st district
- In office December 11, 1996 – April 10, 1998
- Preceded by: Georgette Berube
- Succeeded by: Georgette Berube

Mayor of Lewiston
- In office November 20, 1994 – December 10, 1998
- Preceded by: James Howaniec
- Succeeded by: Kaileigh Tara

Personal details
- Born: May 29, 1952 Newark, New Jersey, U.S.
- Died: September 30, 2020 (aged 68)
- Party: Independent
- Education: Bates College
- Website: Jenkins for Governor

John Jenkins (May 29, 1952 – September 30, 2020) was an American martial artist, motivational speaker, community organizer, and politician who served as the first African American Mayor of Lewiston, Maine from 1994 to 1998, a Member of the Maine Senate from 1996 to 1998 and the Mayor of Auburn, Maine from 2007 to 2009.

Born in Newark, New Jersey, Jenkins graduated from Bates College in 1974. While at college, he excelled in martial arts and upon graduating toured Japan competing in the Karate World Championships. He won the 1977 Championships in karate, and won three other mixed martial arts championships in karate and ju-jitsu.

He returned to Maine to work at his alma mater as director of housing in 1980 before formally entering politics in November 1993. His first political contestation was for the Mayor of Lewiston which he won with a 3 to 1 margin. Two years into his mayoral tenure, he ran and eventually unseated an incumbent legislator to become a member of the Maine Senate representing the 21st district. After a brief hiatus to become a business consultant and a motivational speaker, he entered the 2007 mayoral race for Auburn eventually winning it as a write-in candidate. He returned to business consulting after his term end in 2009.

On November 17, 2017, according to the Maine Ethics Commission, Jenkins announced his candidacy for the 2018 Maine gubernatorial election as a political Independent.

== Biography ==
John Jenkins was born Newark, New Jersey on May 29, 1952 becoming the youngest of three children. His youth was marked with an "abusive" and "violent" atmosphere. He has claimed that "stellar educational opportunities and a firm religious faith" helped him through difficult early years. His mother, a Christian Baptist, sent him to attend the American Friends Service Committee after high school which exposed him to a social program ran by Princeton University where he gained exposure to the benefits of a university education.

In 1970, he enrolled in Bates College, and despite the college's reputation for educating students from "upper middle or affluent backgrounds" who "distanced themselves [from the middle class]" he founded the Afro-American Society. He graduated from the college with a B.A. in psychology in 1974.

While at college, he excelled in martial arts and upon graduating toured Japan competing in the Karate World Championships. He won the 1977 Championships in karate, and won three other mixed martial arts championships in karate and ju-jitsu.

Jenkins died from an undisclosed illness on September 30, 2020.

== Political career ==
=== Mayoralty of Lewiston ===
After serving as the director of housing for Bates College, he announced that he was running for the Mayoralty of Lewiston, Maine in November 1993. He won the election with a margin of 3 to 1. He expanded the city's economy by encouraging domestic direct investment by international businesses. Jenkins was also instrumental in establishing trade and urban partnerships with neighboring towns in Maine. By 1995, the city's economy saw unemployment rates decrease yielding "one of the healthiest economies in [the state]."

==== As adjoining State Senator ====
Two years into his mayoral tenure in 1995, he ran and eventually unseated an incumbent legislator to become a member of the Maine Senate representing the 21st district. He was the first African American to hold the position. The campaign for the Maine Senate was "filled with personal attacks and racial overtones" departing from his previous campaign strategies and reception. After finishing his terms as mayor of Lewiston and state senator he took a hiatus from politics to become a business consultant and motivational speaker.

=== Mayor of Auburn ===
After returning from his hiatus, Jenkins ran, as a write-in candidate, and won the Auburn mayoralty.

== Subsequent political activities ==
In August 2010, Jenkins announced his write-in candidacy for the 2010 Maine gubernatorial election after the current incumbent governor, John Baldacci, was term-limited. As an unregistered contender he competed directly with the Independent candidate Eliot R. Cutler, Democrat Libby Mitchell, and Republican Paul LePage. Through a plurality, Paul LePage was elected governor over the other candidates.

On September 1, 2017, it was announced that Jenkins was interested in launching an exploratory campaign for the 2018 Maine gubernatorial election. He announced he would be running as a political Independent given that everything "falls in place." He would be Maine's first African-American governor, if elected. In November 2017, he filed papers with the Maine Ethics Commission formally announcing his candidacy.

== See also ==
- List of mayors of Auburn, Maine
- List of mayors of Lewiston, Maine
