= Linwood E. Palmer Jr. =

American politician

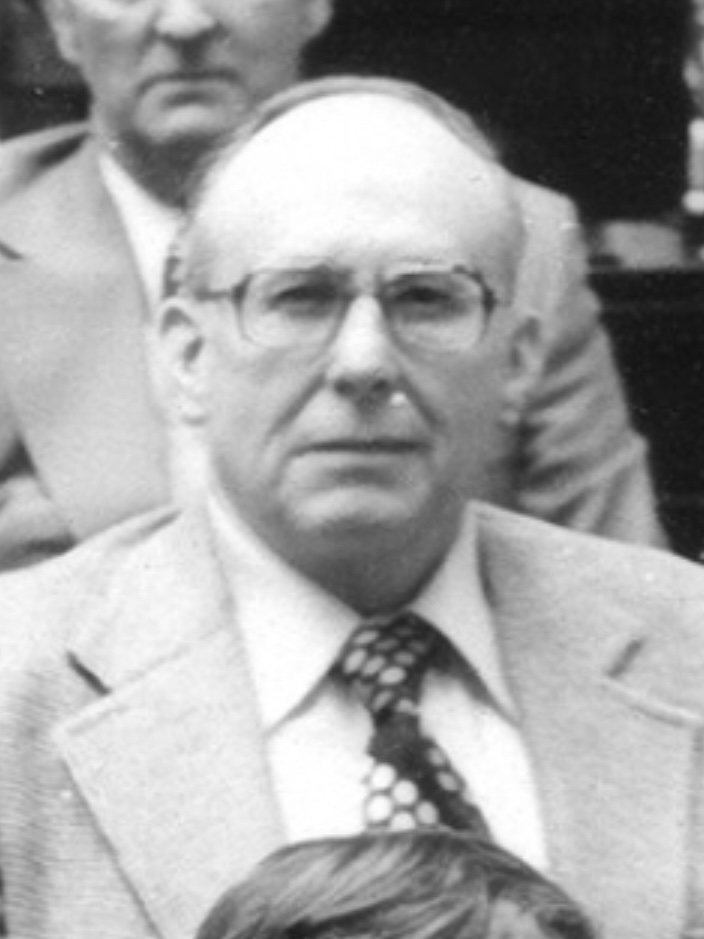

Member of the Maine House of Representatives

Member of the Maine House of Representatives
- In office: 1946–1950; 1972–1978

Member of the Maine Senate
- In office 1951–1952

Personal details
- Born: November 22, 1921 Nobleboro, Maine, US
- Died: July 24, 2008 (aged 86)
- Party: Republican

Linwood E. Palmer Jr. (November 22, 1921 – July 24, 2008) was an American politician from Maine. A Republican from Nobleboro, he served six terms (12 years) in the Maine Legislature, including 10 in the Maine House of Representatives (1946–50 and 1972–78) and two in the Maine Senate (1951–52).

During Palmer's last two terms in the Legislature (1974–78), he served as House Minority Leader. In 1978, Palmer won the Republican nomination for governor, but lost the general election to Democratic State Senator Joseph E. Brennan of Portland.

Palmer attended Colby College, Andover Newton Theological School and the University of Maine.

Party political offices
| Preceded by James Erwin | Republican nominee for Governor of Maine; 1978 | Succeeded by Charles Cragin |
