= Dennis L. Dutremble =

American politician

Dennis L. "Duke" Dutremble (born April 28, 1947) is an American former politician. Dutremble was born in Biddeford, Maine of Franco-American heritage. He attended St. Joseph's School and eventually the University of Maine. He served one term in the Maine House of Representatives and seven terms in the Maine Senate, including as President of the Maine Senate from 1993 to 1994. In 1994, Dutremble ran for the U.S. House of Representatives and narrowly lost to Republican James B. Longley, Jr.

== Personal ==
Dutremble is the son of Lucien Dutremble, who served as York County Commissioner, Mayor of Biddeford and State Representative. He first taught in South Portland and later Thornton Academy in Saco.
