= Thomas J. Connolly =

American lawyer

Tom Connolly

Personal details
- Born: Thomas Connolly; September 25, 1957 (age 68) Canton, Massachusetts, U.S.
- Party: Democratic
- Spouse: Elaine
- Children: 3
- Education: Bates College (BA); University of Maine School of Law (JD)

Thomas Joseph Connolly (born September 25, 1957) is an American attorney and Maine Democratic Party activist. Connolly, a Scarborough resident and attorney based in Portland's Old Port, ran for Governor of Maine in 1998 against incumbent unenrolled Angus King, receiving 12%. During the 2000 presidential election, Connolly leaked news of George W. Bush's 1976 arrest in Kennebunkport, Maine for drunken driving. In October 2006, Connolly was arrested and charged with a misdemeanor for "standing on the side of the highway dressed in a rubber Osama bin Laden mask, waving a plastic gun and a sign protesting a Taxpayer Bill of Rights."

He graduated with a Bachelor of Arts in History from Bates College in 1979 and a Juris Doctor from the University of Maine School of Law in 1982. He and his wife Elaine have three children. He practices law in Portland, Maine.

Party political offices
Preceded by Joseph Brennan	Democratic nominee for Governor of Maine; 1998	Succeeded by John Baldacci
