= John Moore (ice hockey) =

American ice hockey player (born 1990)

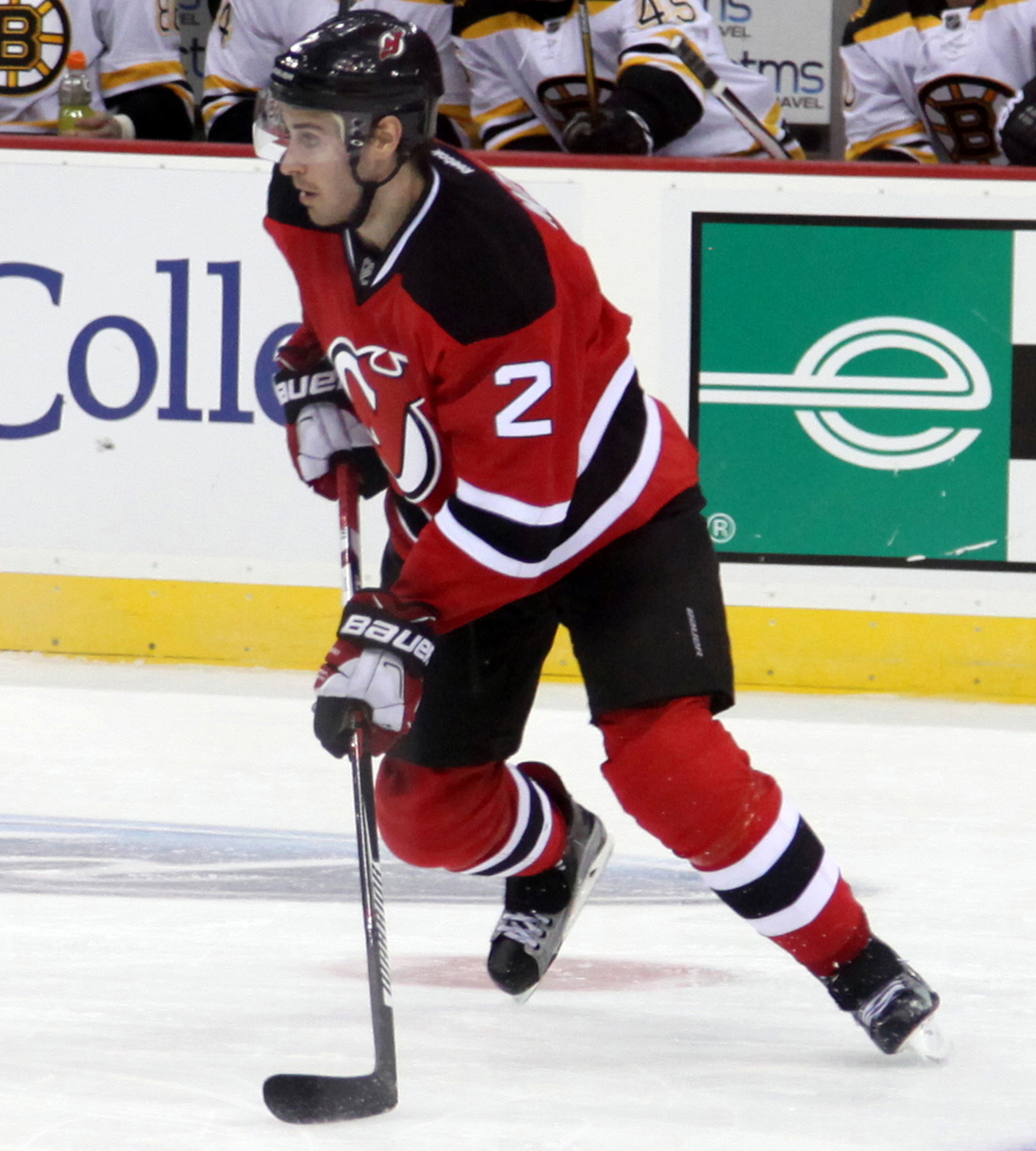
- Moore with the New Jersey Devils in 2016
- Born: November 19, 1990 (age 36) Winnetka, Illinois, U.S.
- Height: 6 ft 3 in (191 cm)
- Weight: 210 lb (95 kg; 15 st 0 lb)
- Position: Defense
- Shot: Left
- Played for: Columbus Blue Jackets; New York Rangers; Arizona Coyotes; New Jersey Devils; Boston Bruins
- National team: United States
- NHL draft: 21st overall, 2009; Columbus Blue Jackets
- Playing career: 2010–2022

John Carroll Moore Jr. (born November 19, 1990) is an American former professional ice hockey player who played defense for 12 seasons in the National Hockey League (NHL). He was drafted in the first round, 21st overall, of the 2009 NHL entry draft by the Columbus Blue Jackets.

== Early life ==
John Carroll Moore Jr. was born on November 19, 1990, in Winnetka, Illinois. His maternal grandfather James B. Longley was the governor of Maine from 1975 until 1979.

== Playing career ==
As a youth, Moore played in the 2003 Quebec International Pee-Wee Hockey Tournament with the Chicago Young Americans minor ice hockey team. He later played for the Winnetka Minor Mite House League before joining the Winnetka Hockey travel program.

=== Junior ===
In 2007, during his junior year at New Trier High School, Moore joined the United States Hockey League's (USHL) Chicago Steel for their 2007–08 season. In 56 games with Chicago, Moore had four goals and 15 points, then he added two assists in seven playoff games. He returned to the Steel for the 2008–09 season and saw his numbers improve greatly, as Moore had 14 goals and 39 points in 57 games. However, Chicago did not make the playoffs. He was eligible for the 2009 NHL entry draft and was the sixth-ranked North American player as well as the top-ranked North American defenseman.

Moore was selected by the Kitchener Rangers of the Ontario Hockey League (OHL) in the second round of the 2009 OHL Priority Draft, also being selected by the Columbus Blue Jackets in the first round, 21st overall, of the 2009 NHL entry draft. Prior to his rookie season with the Rangers, Moore was signed to a three-year entry-level contract with the Blue Jackets on July 21, 2009. In his maiden season with the Rangers in 2009–10, Moore had 10 goals and 47 points in 61 games. Moore then put up impressive numbers in the playoffs, earning 16 points in 20 games as the Rangers lost to the Windsor Spitfires in the Western Conference Finals.

=== Professional ===
==== Columbus Blue Jackets ====
Following his rookie season with the Blue Jackets, Moore was assigned to start the 2010–11 season with the Blue Jackets' American Hockey League (AHL) affiliate, the Springfield Falcons. After 47 games with the Falcons, Moore was recalled by the Blue Jackets and made his NHL debut in a 4–3 victory over the Edmonton Oilers on February 5, 2011. His first NHL goal was scored on October 25, 2011, against Ty Conklin of the Detroit Red Wings.

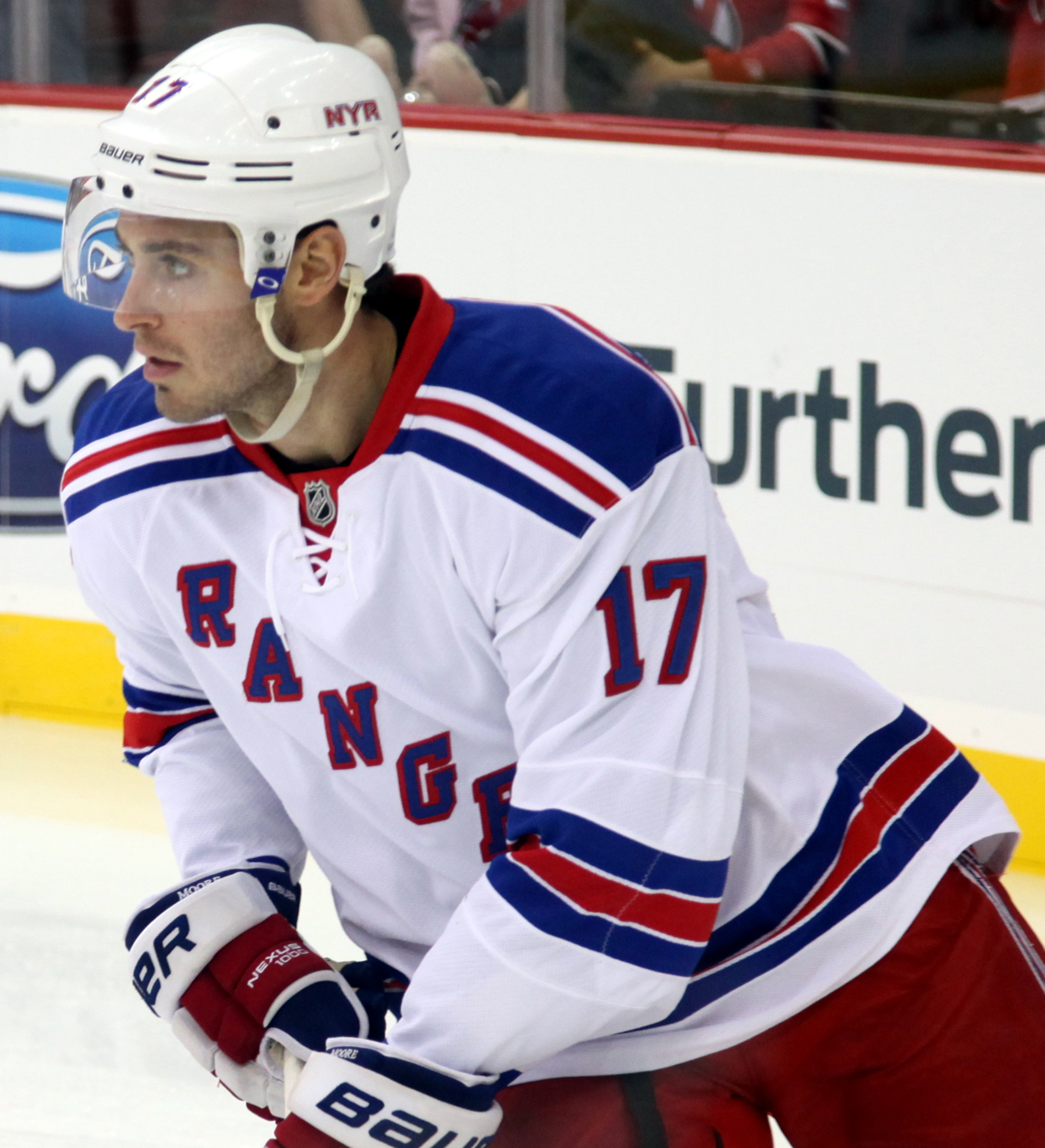
Moore as a Ranger in October 2014

==== New York Rangers ====
During the lockout-shortened 2012–13 season, Moore was included in the NHL trade deadline day deal made by the Blue Jackets that sent Derick Brassard, Derek Dorsett, himself and a sixth-round draft pick to the New York Rangers in exchange for Marián Gáborík and prospects Blake Parlett and Steven Delisle on April 3, 2013. In his first game as a Ranger, only three hours after the trade, Moore scored his first goal of the season in a 6–1 victory over the Pittsburgh Penguins.

==== Arizona Coyotes ====
On March 1, 2015, Moore, along with Anthony Duclair, a 2015 second-round pick and a 2016 first-round pick, were traded to the Arizona Coyotes in exchange for defensemen Keith Yandle, Chris Summers and a 2015 fourth-round pick. In his short time with the club, Moore recorded 1 goal and 5 assists in 19 games. On June 29, Moore was not tendered an offer as a restricted free agent by the Coyotes, making him an unrestricted free agent.

==== New Jersey Devils ====
On July 1, 2015, Moore signed as a free agent to a three-year, $5 million contract with the New Jersey Devils.

During a game against the Washington Capitals in December 2016, Moore was awkwardly hit into the boards by Capitals forward Tom Wilson and stretchered off the ice. He missed 17 games to recover from a concussion before returning to the lineup on February 12, 2017, against the San Jose Sharks. When reflecting on his recovery, Moore stated he worked with Devils skills coach Pertti Hasanen and "really kind of challenged myself when I was injured."

==== Boston Bruins ====
On July 1, 2018, Moore signed as a free agent to a five-year, $13.75 million contract with the Boston Bruins. Following the signing, Moore stated "it was a slam dunk and something I wanted to happen...[Free agency] is a bizarre thing, but when [Bruins General Manager] Don [Sweeney] called it felt right and we just wanted to make it work, and I'm really grateful that we did."

Prior to rejoining the Bruins following an injury, Moore was reassigned to the Providence Bruins on a conditioning stint on December 1, 2019.

Following the Bruins elimination from the 2021 Stanley Cup playoffs, Moore underwent hip arthroscopy and labral repair surgery.

On October 9, 2021, Moore was placed on waivers, which he cleared. However, on October 11, 2021, he was announced as part of the Bruins' opening night roster.

==== Anaheim Ducks ====
On March 19, 2022, Moore was involved in a trade that sent him to the Anaheim Ducks along with Urho Vaakanainen in exchange for Hampus Lindholm. The Ducks then attempted to trade both Moore and the remainder of Ryan Kesler's contract to the Vegas Golden Knights in exchange for Evgenii Dadonov and a conditional second-round pick at the NHL trade deadline on March 21, 2022. However, the deal went into dispute due to a no-trade clause in Dadonov's contract. On March 23, the NHL officially cancelled the trade, therefore Moore remained in the Ducks' organization.

== Personal life ==
Moore married fellow Illinois native Elizabeth Wanders in July 2016. Following his hockey career, Moore attended the University of Chicago.

== Career statistics ==
=== Regular season and playoffs ===
			Regular season					Playoffs
Season	Team	League	GP	G	A	Pts	PIM	GP	G	A	Pts	PIM
2006–07	Chicago Mission 16U AAA	T1EHL	31	1	12	13	26	—	—	—	—	—
2007–08	Chicago Steel	USHL	56	4	11	14	26	7	0	2	2	2
2008–09	Chicago Steel	USHL	57	14	25	39	50	—	—	—	—	—
2009–10	Kitchener Rangers	OHL	61	10	37	47	53	20	4	12	16	2
2010–11	Springfield Falcons	AHL	73	5	19	24	23	—	—	—	—	—
2010–11	Columbus Blue Jackets	NHL	2	0	0	0	0	—	—	—	—	—
2011–12	Springfield Falcons	AHL	5	1	1	2	2	—	—	—	—	—
2011–12	Columbus Blue Jackets	NHL	67	2	5	7	8	—	—	—	—	—
2012–13	Springfield Falcons	AHL	24	3	6	9	10	—	—	—	—	—
2012–13	Columbus Blue Jackets	NHL	17	0	1	1	2	—	—	—	—	—
2012–13	New York Rangers	NHL	13	1	5	6	5	12	0	1	1	2
2013–14	New York Rangers	NHL	74	4	11	15	25	21	0	2	2	16
2014–15	New York Rangers	NHL	38	1	5	6	19	—	—	—	—	—
2014–15	Arizona Coyotes	NHL	19	1	4	5	11	—	—	—	—	—
2015–16	New Jersey Devils	NHL	73	4	15	19	28	—	—	—	—	—
2016–17	New Jersey Devils	NHL	63	12	10	22	39	—	—	—	—	—
2017–18	New Jersey Devils	NHL	81	7	11	18	47	5	0	1	1	12
2018–19	Boston Bruins	NHL	61	4	9	13	26	10	0	0	0	0
2019–20	Providence Bruins	AHL	1	0	1	1	0	—	—	—	—	—
2019–20	Boston Bruins	NHL	24	2	1	3	11	1	0	0	0	0
2020–21	Boston Bruins	NHL	5	0	2	2	2	—	—	—	—	—
2021–22	Boston Bruins	NHL	7	0	1	1	4	—	—	—	—	—
2021–22	Providence Bruins	AHL	11	1	5	6	8	—	—	—	—	—
NHL totals			544	38	80	118	227	49	0	4	4	30

=== International ===
Medal record

Representing United States

Ice hockey

World Championships
Bronze medal – third place	2015 Czech Republic	

Year	Team	Event	Result	GP	G	A	Pts	PIM
2015	United States	WC	3rd place, bronze medalist(s)	9	0	1	1	4
Senior totals				9	0	1	1	4

Awards and achievements
Preceded by Nikita Filatov	Columbus Blue Jackets first-round draft pick 2009	Succeeded by Ryan Johansen
