= Richard Carey (politician) =

American politician

Member of the Maine Senate from the 14th district
- In office 1992–2000
- Succeeded by: Kenneth Gagnon

Personal details
- Born: January 7, 1929 Waterville, Maine
- Died: July 19, 2013 (aged 84) Belgrade, Maine
- Party: Democrat
- Spouse: Helen Carey

Richard J. "Spike" Carey (January 7, 1929 – July 19, 2013) was an American politician from Maine. Carey served as an Alderman, Councilman, and as the longest serving Mayor of Waterville, Maine from 1970 to 1978. From 1967 to 1978, Carey also represented Waterville in the Maine House of Representatives. He served in the Maine Senate from 1992 to 2000 (term limited). In 2004, he ran again for the State Senate against incumbent Chandler Woodcock and lost. Carey was also the first Town Manager for the Town of Belgrade, Maine. He later served on the Town of Belgrade Board of Selectmen.

== Personal ==
Carey was born and raised in the French-speaking South End of Waterville and did not speak English until he was 12 years old. His father was a member of the Waterville City Council. He graduated from Waterville High School.
