= Charles Cragin =

American politician from Maine

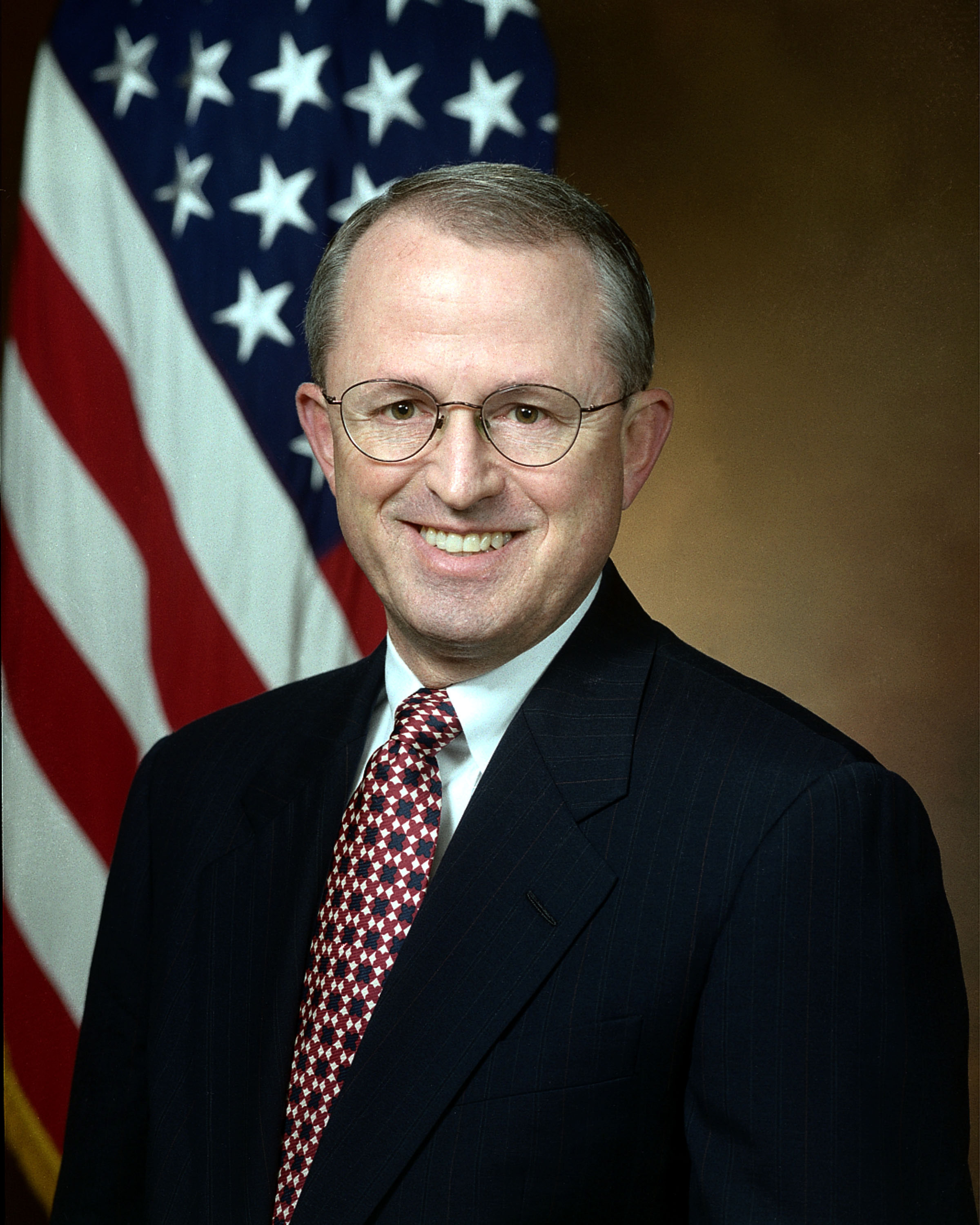

Assistant Secretary of Defense for Manpower and Reserve Affairs
- Acting; August 4, 1999 – May 31, 2001; April 12, 1998 - August 3, 1999
- President: Bill Clinton
- Secretary: William Cohen; Donald Rumsfeld
- Preceded by: Deborah R. Lee
- Succeeded by: Thomas F. Hall

United States Under Secretary of Defense for Personnel and Readiness
- Acting; March 31, 2000 – May 23, 2000
- President: Bill Clinton
- Secretary: William Cohen
- Preceded by: Rudy de Leon
- Succeeded by: Bernard Rostker

Chairman of the Board of Veterans' Appeals
- In office March 1991 – March 1997
- President: George H. W. Bush; Bill Clinton
- Preceded by: Kenneth E. Eaton
- Succeeded by: Roger K. Bauer (acting)

Personal details
- Born: Charles Langmaid Cragin III; October 9, 1943 (age 82) Portland, Maine, U.S.
- Party: Republican
- Education: University of Maine (BS), (JD)
- Awards: Legion of Merit; Defense Meritorious Service Medal; Navy Meritorious Service Medal (2); Navy Commendation Medal (2); Army Commendation Medal; Navy Expeditionary Medal; National Defense Service Medal; Navy Good Conduct Medal; Armed Forces Reserve Medal

Military service
- Branch/service: United States Navy; United States Navy Reserve
- Years of service: 1961-1964 (active duty); 1964-1998 (reserve)
- Rank: Captain

Charles Langmaid Cragin III (born October 9, 1943) is an American attorney and politician from Maine. He was the Republican nominee for governor of Maine in 1982, losing in a landslide to Democratic incumbent Gov. Joseph E. Brennan. Afterwards, Cragin was a Republican National Committee member from Maine from 1983 to 1990, and acting U.S. Under Secretary of Defense for Personnel and Readiness in 2000.

Cragin also was the first Senate-confirmed chairman of the Board of Veterans' Appeals in the U.S. Department of Veterans' Affairs.

== Education ==
He received a Bachelor of Science in Education from the University of Maine in 1967, completing his course of study in two and a half years and being inducted into the Phi Kapp Phi Honor Society. In 1970 he was awarded his Juris Doctor from the University of Maine School of Law, graduating first in his class.

== Military service ==
He enlisted in the United States Navy in 1961 and was on active duty and in the Navy Reserve until his retirement as a Captain in 1998. In 2020, Cragin wrote of his experiences as a young Sailor aboard USNS Sergeant Joseph T. Muller (T-AG-171), an electronic intelligence ship, whose mission had previously been classified Top Secret code word UMBRA.

For his military service he was awarded the Legion of Merit and many other medals.

== Early career ==
From 1964 to 1969 he was an announcer and newsman for WIDE Radio, WPOR Radio, and WSCH Radio & TV. All based in Biddeford and Portland. In 1969 he was a research assistant for Peat, Marwick, Mitchell & Co.

== Legal career ==
Cragin was admitted to practice before the Courts of Maine and the U.S. District Court for the District of Maine in 1970, having ranked first in the 1970 Maine Bar Exam. From 1970 to 1990 he practiced law with Verrill and Dana in Portland, Maine. In 1974, he was admitted to practice before the Supreme Court of the United States. In 1979 he was admitted to practice in the District of Columbia and before the U.S. Tax Court and the U.S. Court of Veterans Appeals.

While at Verrill Dana, Cragin practiced general litigation and served as general counsel to Maine Medical Association and Maine Hospital Association. In his statement before the Senate Committee on Veterans Affairs, Senator William S. Cohen stated "Given his expertise, he was the principal author of much of the health-care legislation adopted by the Maine Legislature during the 1970s".

== Federal service ==
In 1990, he was nominated by President George H. W. Bush and confirmed by the United States Senate in 1991 as Chairman of the Board of Veterans' Appeals of the Department of Veterans Affairs. At the conclusion of his tenure, he was awarded the department's Exceptional Service Award in February 1997 by Secretary Jesse Brown.

He later served in several senior capacities in the Department of Defense including Acting Under Secretary of Defense for Personnel & Readiness (31 March 2000 to 23 May 2000, and 20 January 2001 to 31 May 2001) Principal Deputy Under Secretary for Personnel & Readiness, Acting Assistant Secretary of Defense for Reserve Affairs (1998-2001), and Acting Assistant to the Secretary of Defense for Civil Support. While at the Pentagon, he participated in a number of special investigations including the identification of the remains interred in the Vietnam Tomb of the Unknowns at Arlington National Cemetery and a bi-lateral investigation with the Republic of Korea regarding alleged events in July 1950 at No Gun Ri. On behalf of Secretary of Defense, William S. Cohen, Cragin broke down barriers to the integration of active and reserve forces including the transition of Guard and Reserve ID cards to match those carried by active duty servicemembers.

In 1999, Mr. Cragin led the initiative announced by President Clinton and Secretary Cohen to develop Rapid Assessment and Initial Detection Teams (RAID Teams). These teams were subsequently named Weapons of Mass Destruction Civil Support Teams (WMDCST).

On October 17, 2000, the Commandant of the U. S. Coast Guard presented Cragin with the Department of Transportation Distinguished Public Service Award. In January 2001, Secretary of Defense William S. Cohen presented Cragin with the Department of Defense Medal for Distinguished Public Service, the highest award that is presented by the United States Secretary of Defense. In that same month, Secretary of the Navy Richard Danzig presented Mr. Cragin with the Department of the Navy's Distinguished Public Service Award. He was also presented the Department of the Air Force Decoration for Exceptional Civilian Service by the Secretary of the Air Force Whitten Peters and the Department of the Army's Decoration for Distinguished Civilian Service by Joseph W. Westfall.

== Later career ==
After retiring from federal service in 2001, he became a partner in the Washington, D.C. office of Blank Rome, LLP. In 2003 he joined System Planning Corporation (SPC) of Arlington, Virginia as its Senior Vice President for National Intelligence, Security and Response.

He served as Chairman of the Advisory Committee on Gulf War Veterans from 2008 to 2009. In September 2009, the Committee released a significant report "Changing the Culture: Placing Care Before Process".

== Political candidacy ==
Cragin sought the Republican nomination for Governor of Maine in 1978 and 1982. After finishing second in the 1978 Republican gubernatorial primary, Republican members of the Maine Legislature nominated him for Attorney General. Cragin expressed concerns about potential conflicts of interest as a result of his law firm's extensive legal practice across Maine. The Maine Legislature requested an opinion from the Justices of the Maine Supreme Judicial Court seeking to clarify whether Cragin's association with the law firm, Verrill Dana, LLP, would pose any legal issues if he were elected Attorney General. The Justices declined to answer the question, and Cragin withdrew his candidacy.

In 1982, Cragin again sought the Republican nomination for Governor of Maine. In a three-way contested primary, he received his party's nomination. He was defeated in the general election by the Democratic incumbent, Joseph Brennan, by a vote tally of 281,066 to 172,949.

Cragin served as Chairman of the Budget Committee of the Republican National Committee for many years. He served as Chief Sergeant-at-Arms at the 1988 Republican National Convention in New Orleans, Louisiana.

== Boards and Charitable Organizations ==
Since 1984, Cragin has served on the Board of Directors of the Margaret Chase Smith Foundation, serving for the past several years as the Board President. From 1986 to 1988, he served as a member of the Defense Advisory Committee on Women in the Services (DACOWITS).

Party political offices
Preceded by Linwood Palmer, Jr.	Republican nominee for Governor of Maine; 1982	Succeeded by John McKernan, Jr.
Government offices
Preceded by Rudy de Leon	United States Under Secretary of Defense for Personnel and Readiness; Acting; March 31, 2000 – May 23, 2000	Succeeded by Bernard Rostker
