= James B. Longley =

American politician (1924–1980)

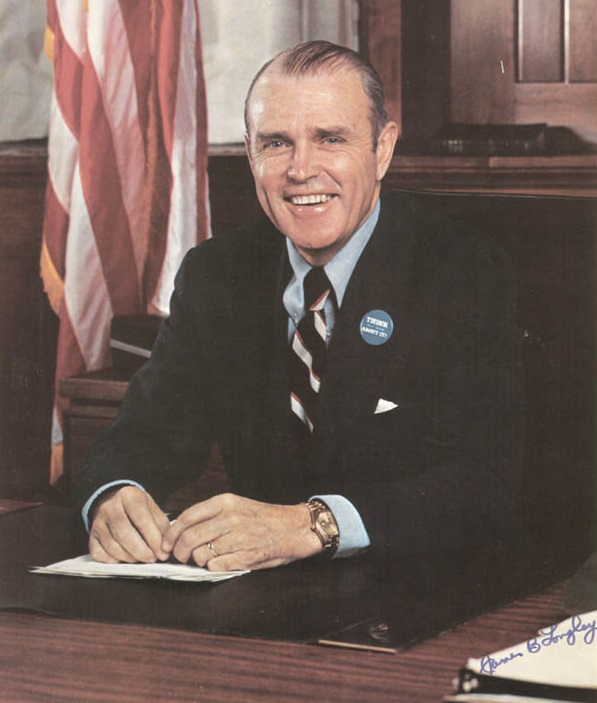
- Longley in 1975

69th Governor of Maine
- In office January 2, 1975 – January 3, 1979
- Preceded by: Kenneth M. Curtis
- Succeeded by: Joseph E. Brennan

Personal details
- Born: James Bernard Longley; April 22, 1924 Lewiston, Maine, US
- Died: August 16, 1980 (aged 56) Lewiston, Maine, US
- Party: Independent (1974–1980)
- Other political affiliations: Democratic (before 1974)
- Spouse: Helen Walsh (m. 1949)
- Children: 5, including James Jr.
- Relatives: John Moore (grandson)

James Bernard Longley Sr. (April 22, 1924 – August 16, 1980) was an American politician. He served as the 69th governor of Maine from 1975 to 1979, and was the first Independent to hold the office.

== Early life ==
Longley, a graduate of Bowdoin College in Brunswick, Maine, resided in the cities of Lewiston and Auburn, Maine.

== Career ==
The owner of a successful insurance agency in Lewiston, Longley got his first opportunity in statewide politics when then-Governor Kenneth M. Curtis asked him to lead a state government commission called the Maine Management and Cost Survey Commission, which was intended to make government more efficient, and cut costs. After initial reluctance, Longley accepted the position and pursued the job with vigor.

Longley made several recommendations that were projected to save the state in excess of $24 million. One of his major proposals included restructuring the Maine university system, which he felt was grossly inefficient. His work at the commission gave him a prominent statewide profile, something he tried to turn into an electoral mandate when Governor Curtis retired in 1974.

=== Governor of Maine 1975–1979 ===
Longley had been a lifelong Democrat, but due to earning a maverick reputation by acting in a non-partisan role on the cost-cutting commission, and because he inadvertently missed the filing deadline for party candidates in the 1974 Maine gubernatorial election, he ran as an independent. Some Maine observers believed Longley knew he would be unable to beat both former Edmund Muskie adviser George J. Mitchell and state Senator Joseph E. Brennan in a Democratic primary, causing him not to file with the party. He ran on the slogan "Think About It," a phrase he often used with insurance customers to get them to consider his products. He was endorsed by the Bangor Daily News. Despite trailing in the polls by double digits, he won the election with 40% of the vote and was sworn in as governor on January 2, 1975.

During his term as governor, Longley opposed the legal efforts by the Penobscot and Passamaquoddy tribes to seek recovery of land. In 1977, he encouraged the Maine congressional delegation to introduce bills that would end Indian claims to property in Maine. The bills were eventually withdrawn. Longley's unwillingness to discuss a settlement with the Penobscot and Passamaquoddy delayed negotiations, which eventually resulted in Joint Tribal Council of the Passamaquoddy Tribe v. Morton.

Longley issued 118 vetoes in total as governor, a record that stood until Governor Paul LePage vetoed 624 bills. Longley holds the record for having the most vetoes overridden by the legislature in a single term (64).

Longley is still notable in Maine politics for having made off-the-cuff abrasive comments. He once referred to state legislators as "pimps". Other Maine governors who are seen as having a similar style are sometimes compared to Longley, such as LePage.

Longley promised during his campaign that he would serve only one term, and did not run for re-election in 1978.

== Personal life and death ==
In 1949, Longley married Helen Angela Walsh, who died on September 13, 2005. They had five children, including former Republican U.S. Representative James B. Longley Jr. (born 1951).

Longley died of cancer on August 16, 1980, and was interred at Mount Hope Cemetery in Lewiston.

Political offices
Preceded by Kenneth M. Curtis	Governor of Maine; 1975–1979	Succeeded by Joseph E. Brennan
