= Joseph E. Brennan =

American lawyer and politician (1934–2024)

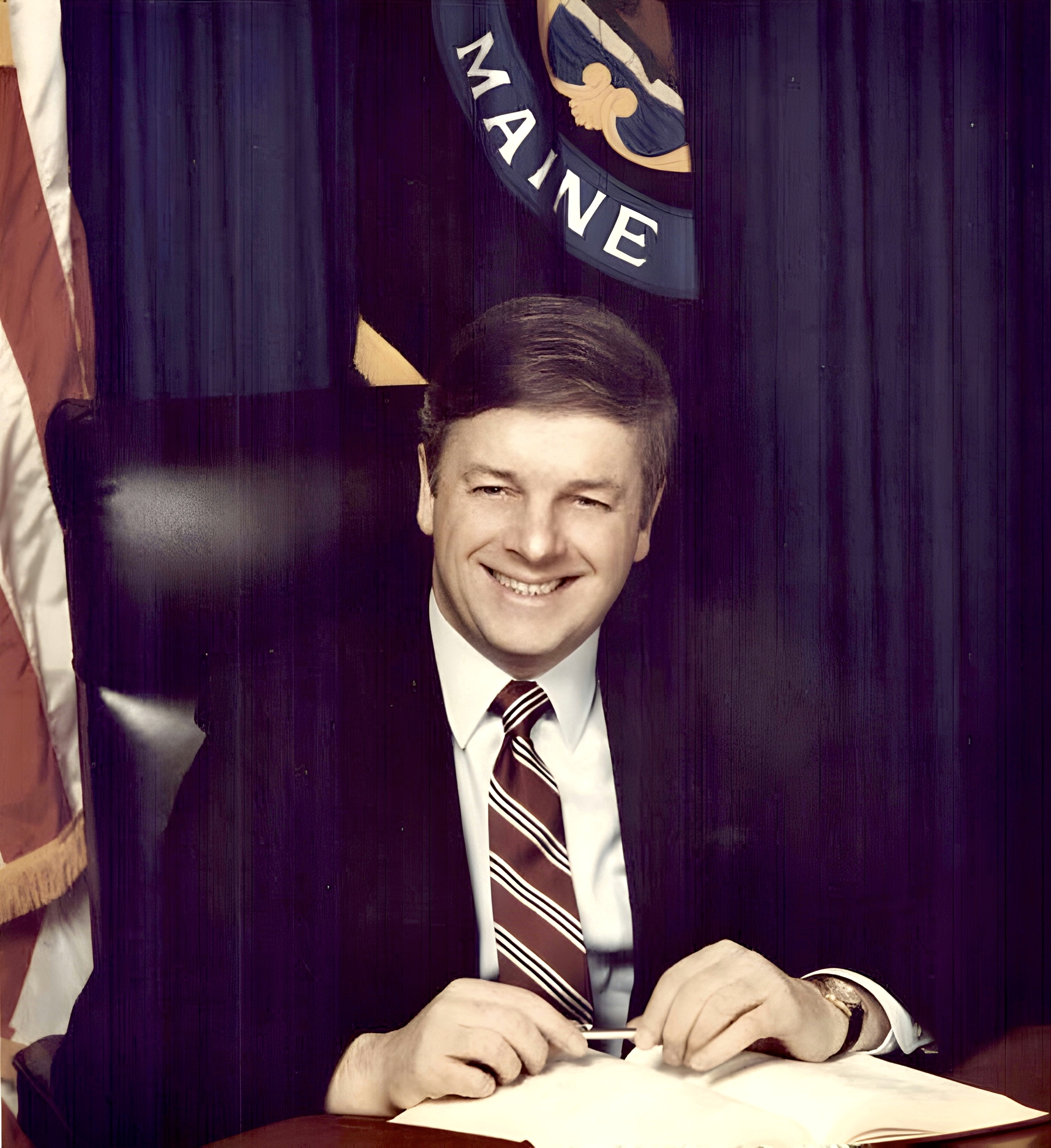
- Brennan as governor

Commissioner of the Federal Maritime Commission
- In office November 10, 1999 – January 1, 2013
- President: Bill Clinton; George W. Bush; Barack Obama
- Preceded by: William Hathaway
- Succeeded by: William P. Doyle

Member of the U.S. House of Representatives from Maine's 1st district
- In office January 7, 1987 – January 3, 1991
- Preceded by: John R. McKernan Jr.
- Succeeded by: Thomas Andrews

70th Governor of Maine
- In office January 3, 1979 – January 7, 1987
- Preceded by: James B. Longley
- Succeeded by: John R. McKernan Jr.

Attorney General of Maine
- In office January 2, 1975 – January 3, 1979
- Governor: James B. Longley
- Preceded by: Jon Lund
- Succeeded by: Richard Cohen

Member of the Maine Senate from the 10th district
- In office January 3, 1973 – January 1, 1975
- Preceded by: Gerard Conley
- Succeeded by: Philip Merrill

Member of the Maine House of Representatives from the Portland district
- In office January 6, 1965 – January 6, 1971 Serving with 11 at-large members

Personal details
- Born: Joseph Edward Brennan; November 2, 1934 Portland, Maine, U.S.
- Died: April 5, 2024 (aged 89) Portland, Maine, U.S.
- Party: Democratic
- Spouse: Connie LaPointe Brennan (m. 1994)
- Children: 2
- Education: Boston College (BS); University of Maine (LLB)

Military service
- Branch/service: United States Army
- Years of service: 1953–1955

Joseph Edward Brennan (November 2, 1934 – April 5, 2024) was an American lawyer and politician from Maine. A member of the Democratic Party, he served as the 70th governor of Maine from 1979 to 1987 and in the United States House of Representatives for Maine's 1st congressional district from 1987 to 1991. Brennan was a commissioner on the Federal Maritime Commission during the Clinton, George W. Bush, and Obama administrations.

== Early life ==
Brennan was born on November 2, 1934, in Portland, Maine. He lived on Kellogg Street, on the third floor of tenement housing on Munjoy Hill. He was raised in a family of eight children, with his parents being Irish immigrants. Brennan graduated from Cheverus High School, Boston College, and the University of Maine School of Law. Brennan served in the United States Army from 1953 to 1955.

== Government service ==
=== Legislative service ===
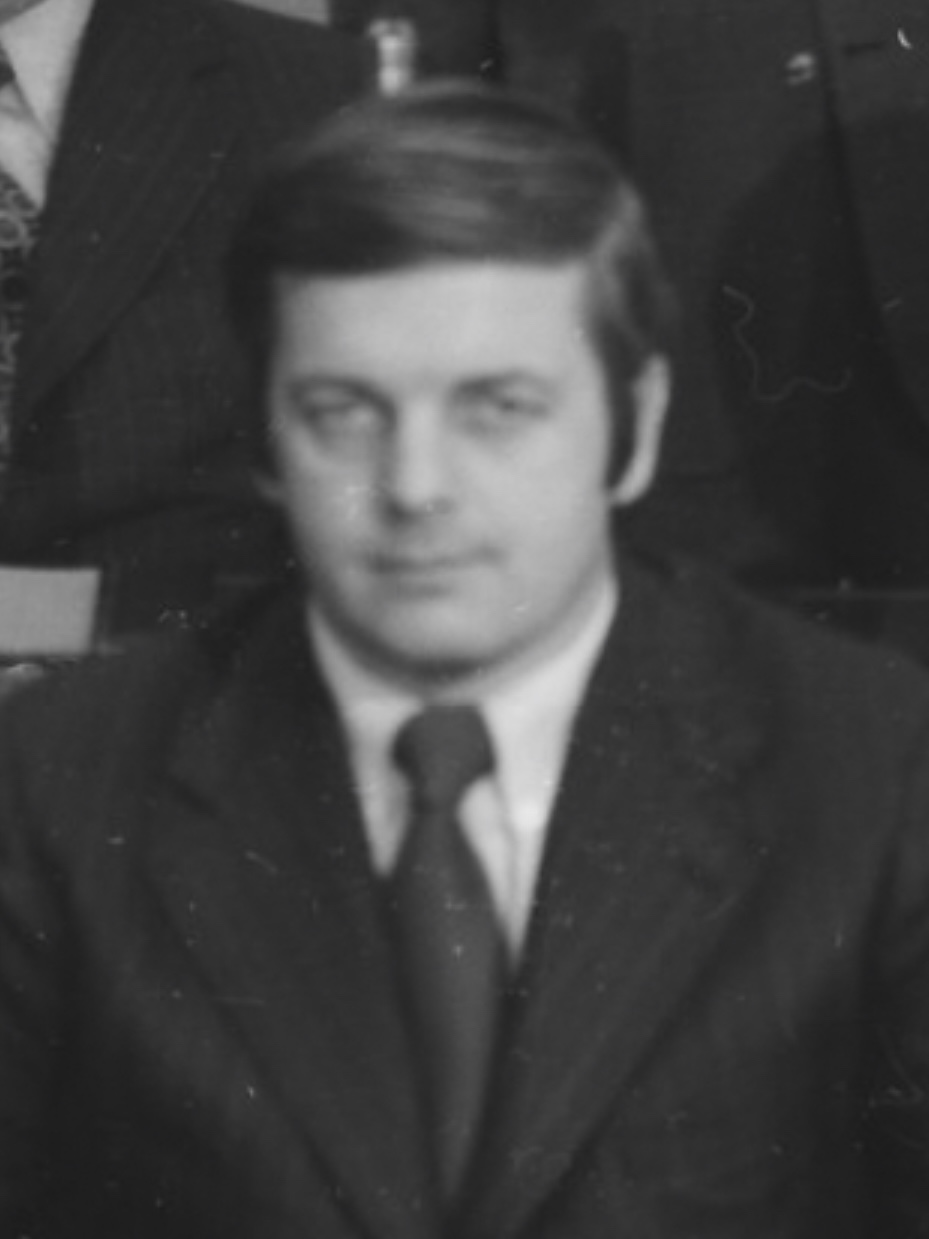
Brennan in 1973

Brennan won election to the Maine House of Representatives in 1964, and served three terms. When first elected to the Maine House he did not own a car and hitchhiked up from Portland. In 1970, he was elected Cumberland County district attorney. During his service as district attorney, his Munjoy Hill house was shot up, with bullets landing by his infant daughter. This led Brennan to support the ban on assault-style weapons in the United States. He was elected to the Maine Senate in 1972.

=== Attorney General and Governor of Maine ===
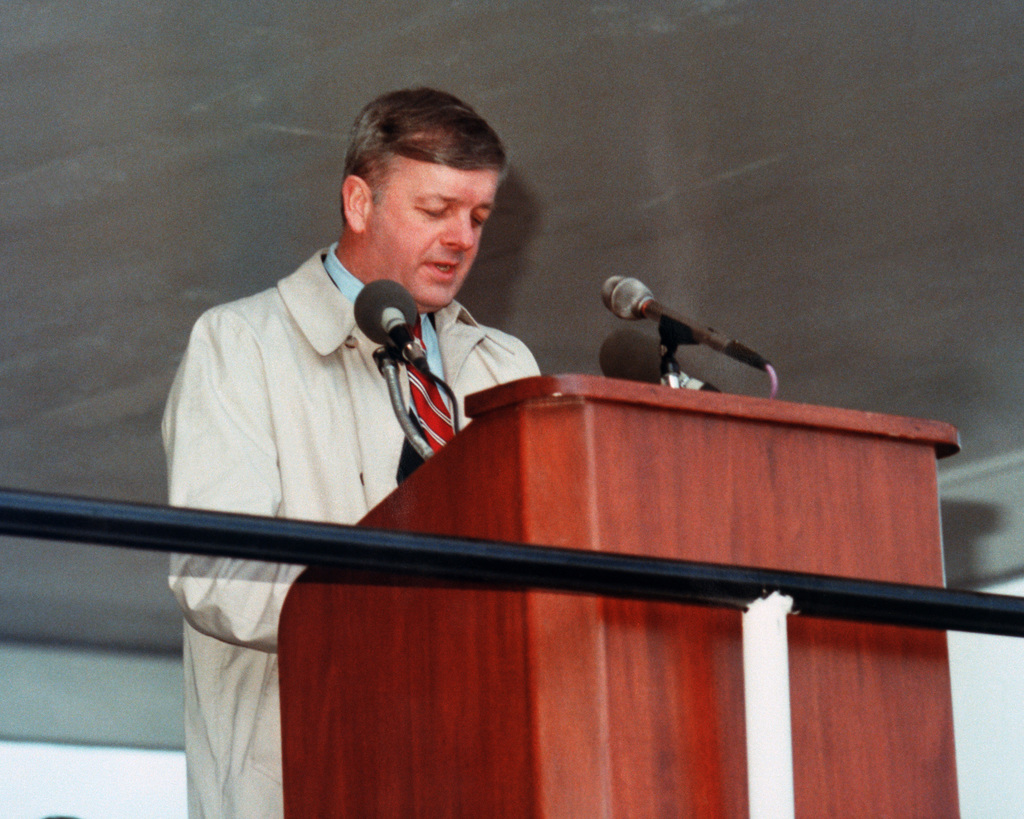
Brennan in 1988

Brennan ran for governor of Maine in 1974. That year he became the first candidate in the post-Watergate years to call for campaign finance reform. He also voluntarily disclosed his personal finances. Brennan lost the Democratic nomination to George J. Mitchell. The Maine Legislature selected Brennan to be the Maine Attorney General on January 2, 1975. As attorney general, Brennan took part in negotiations with both Wabanaki tribes and the federal government on what became the Maine Indian Land Claims Settlement Act of 1980, a federal law enacted during the presidency of Jimmy Carter.

Brennan ran for governor again in 1978 and won the election, then was reelected by a wider margin in 1982, serving a total of eight years. As governor, Brennan launched education reforms, pressed for tough highway safety measures, and helped to establish the Finance Authority of Maine. Among the notable people Brennan appointed as governor was future Senate Majority Leader George J. Mitchell, whom Brennan nominated to the US Senate seat formerly occupied by Edmund Muskie upon Muskie's resignation to become Secretary of State, and future Governor of Maine Janet Mills, whom Brennan appointed as the first female district attorney in the New England region.

=== United States Representative ===
In 1986, Brennan ran for the U.S. House in Maine's 1st congressional district and defeated Republican Rollin Ives 53% to 44%. in 1988 Brennan was reelected to the House by a margin of 63% to 37%.

In Congress Brennan opposed President Ronald Reagan Administration’s interventions in Central America and Iran. he also supported the balanced budget amendment as a Congressman.

=== Later gubernatorial and Senate campaigns ===
Brennan ran for governor again in 1990, losing to Republican John McKernan by 13,728 votes. He ran again in 1994, losing to Independent Angus King by 7,878 votes, but placing second, ahead of Republican Susan Collins. He faced Collins in another statewide election in 1996, running for the U.S. Senate seat being vacated by Bill Cohen, which Collins won by 32,196 votes.

=== Later career ===
In 1999, President Bill Clinton nominated Brennan to serve as a commissioner on the Federal Maritime Commission. He was re-nominated by President George W. Bush and confirmed for a second term in 2004.

== Personal life and death ==
Brennan married Connie LaPointe in 1994. He had two children: J.B. Brennan, who is a veteran of the United States Secret Service, and Dr. Tara Brennan, who holds a Doctorate of Psychology from LIU Brooklyn.

Brennan died of natural causes at his home in the Portland neighborhood of Munjoy Hill (where he grew up), on April 5, 2024, at the age of 89.

== Electoral history ==
1974 Democratic gubernatorial primary results
Party	Candidate	Votes	%
Democratic	George J. Mitchell	33,312	37.52
Democratic	Joseph E. Brennan	23,443	26.41
Democratic	Peter S. Kelley	21,358	24.06
Democratic	Lloyd LaFountain	7,954	8.95
Democratic	Aaron Levine	1,545	1.74
Democratic	Jack Smith	1,165	1.31
Total votes		88,777	100.00

1978 Democratic gubernatorial primary results
Party	Candidate	Votes	%
Democratic	Joseph E. Brennan	38,631	52.19
Democratic	Philip L. Merrill	26,803	36.21
Democratic	Richard Carey	8,588	11.60
Total votes		74,022	100.00

1978 Maine gubernatorial election results
Party	Candidate	Votes	%	±%
Democratic	Joseph E. Brennan	176,493	47.80%	−
Republican	Linwood E. Palmer Jr.	126,862	34.36%	−
Independent	Herman C. Frankland	65,889	17.84%	−
Majority		49,631	13.44%	
Democratic gain from Independent		Swing		

1982 Democratic gubernatorial primary results
Party	Candidate	Votes	%
Democratic	Joseph E. Brennan	56,990	76.80
Democratic	Georgette Berube	17,219	23.20
Total votes		74,209	100.00

1982 Maine gubernatorial election results
Party	Candidate	Votes	%	±%
Democratic	Joseph E. Brennan (Incumbent)	281,066	61.91%	−
Republican	Charles Cragin	172,949	38.09%	−
Majority		108,117	23.81%	
Democratic hold		Swing		

US House election, 1986: Maine District 1
Party	Candidate	Votes	%	±%
Democratic	Joseph E. Brennan	121,848	53.16%	
Republican	H. Rollin Ives	100,260	43.74%	
Labor for Maine	Plato Truman	7,109	3.10%	
Majority		21,588	9.42%	
Turnout		229,217		
Democratic gain from Republican				

US House election, 1988: Maine District 1
Party	Candidate	Votes	%	±%
Democratic	Joseph E. Brennan (incumbent)	167,623	60.11%	
Republican	Edward S. O'Meara	111,125	36.78%	
Majority		79,864	26.44%	
Turnout		278,748		
Democratic hold		Swing		

1990 Maine gubernatorial election results
Party	Candidate	Votes	%	±%
Republican	John McKernan Jr. (incumbent)	243,766	46.68%	−
Democratic	Joseph E. Brennan	230,038	44.05%	−
Independent	Andrew Adam	48,377	9.27%	−
Plurality		13,728	2.63%	
Turnout		522,181		
Republican hold		Swing		

1994 Democratic gubernatorial primary results
Party	Candidate	Votes	%
Democratic	Joseph E. Brennan	56,359	56.2
Democratic	Tom Allen	23,881	23.8
Democratic	Dick Barringer	9,136	9.1
Democratic	Robert Woodbury	8,150	8.1
Democratic	Donnell Carroll	2,618	2.6
Total votes		100,144	100.0

1994 Maine gubernatorial election
Party	Candidate	Votes	%
Independent	Angus King	180,829	35.37%
Democratic	Joseph Brennan	172,951	33.83%
Republican	Susan Collins	117,990	23.08%
Green	Jonathan Carter	32,695	6.39%
Write-in	Ed Finks	6,576	1.29%
Write-in		267	0.05%
Total votes		511,308	100.00%
Independent gain from Republican			

1996 Democratic U.S. Senate primary results
Party	Candidate	Votes	%
Democratic	Joseph E. Brennan	48,335	56.68%
Democratic	Sean Faircloth	21,204	24.87%
Democratic	Richard A. Spencer	10,236	12.00%
Democratic	Jean Hay Bright	4,524	5.31%
Democratic	Jerald Leonard	939	1.10%
Democratic	Write-ins	35	0.04%
Total votes		85,273	100.00%

United States Senate election in Maine, 1996
Party	Candidate	Votes	%	±%
Republican	Susan Collins	298,422	49.18%	−12.16%
Democratic	Joseph E. Brennan	266,226	43.88%	+5.24%
Independent	John C. Rensenbrink	23,441	3.86%	N/A
Constitution	William P. Clarke	18,618	3.07%	N/A
Write-in		70	0.01%	N/A
Majority		32,196	5.31%	−17.39%
Turnout		606,777		
Republican hold				

Legal offices
Preceded by Jon Lund	Attorney General of Maine; 1975–1979	Succeeded by Richard Cohen
Party political offices
Preceded by George Mitchell	Democratic nominee for Governor of Maine; 1978, 1982	Succeeded by James Tierney
Preceded by James Tierney	Democratic nominee for Governor of Maine; 1990, 1994	Succeeded by Tom Connolly
Preceded by Neil Rolde	Democratic nominee for U.S. Senator from Maine (Class 2); 1996	Succeeded by Chellie Pingree
Political offices
Preceded by Jim Longley	Governor of Maine; 1979–1987	Succeeded by Jock McKernan
U.S. House of Representatives
Preceded by Jock McKernan	Member of the U.S. House of Representatives from Maine's 1st congressional district 1987–1991	Succeeded by Tom Andrews
