= 1986 United States gubernatorial elections =

- November 4, 1986

38 governorships 36 states; 2 territories
	Majority party	Minority party
Party	Democratic	Republican
Seats before	34	16
Seats after	26	24
Seat change	▼8	▲8
Seats up	27	9
Seats won	19	17
- Republican hold Republican gain Democratic hold Democratic gain

United States gubernatorial elections were held on November 4, 1986, in 36 states and two territories. The Democrats had a net loss of eight seats during this election, which coincided with the Senate and the House elections. This was despite the Democratic trend on a federal level, making this the last midterm election until 2022 where the party of the incumbent president achieved a net gain of governorships.

== Election results ==
=== States ===
State	Incumbent	Party	First elected	Result	Candidates
Alabama	George Wallace	Democratic	1962; 1966 (term-limited); 1970; 1978 (term-limited); 1982	Incumbent retired. New governor elected. Republican gain.	✓ H. Guy Hunt (Republican) 56.4%; Bill Baxley (Democratic) 43.6%
Alaska	Bill Sheffield	Democratic	1982	Incumbent lost re-nomination. New governor elected. Democratic hold.	✓ Steve Cowper (Democratic) 47.3%; Arliss Sturgulewski (Republican) 42.6%; Joe Vogler (Alaskan Ind.) 5.6%; Wally Hickel (write-in) 2.8%; Mary Jane O'Brannon (Libertarian) 0.6%
Arizona	Bruce Babbitt	Democratic	1978 (Note: Babbitt took office after his predecessor (Wesley Bolin) died.)	Incumbent retired. New governor elected. Republican gain.	✓ Evan Mecham (Republican) 39.7%; Carolyn Warner (Democratic) 34.5%; Bill Schulz (Independent) 25.8%
Arkansas	Bill Clinton	Democratic	1978; 1980 (defeated); 1982	Incumbent re-elected.	✓ Bill Clinton (Democratic) 63.9%; Frank D. White (Republican) 36.1%
California	George Deukmejian	Republican	1982	Incumbent re-elected.	✓ George Deukmejian (Republican) 60.2%; Tom Bradley (Democratic) 37.2%; Maria Elizabeth Muñoz (PF) 1.3%; Joseph Fuhrig (Libertarian) 0.7%<; Gary V. Miller (American Ind.) 0.7%
Colorado	Richard Lamm	Democratic	1974	Incumbent retired. New governor elected. Democratic hold.	✓ Roy Romer (Democratic) 58.2%; Ted Strickland (Republican) 41.0%; Earl Dodge (Prohibition) 0.8%
Connecticut	William A. O'Neill	Democratic	1980 (Note: O'Neill took office after his predecessor (Ella Grasso) resigned. He was subsequently elected in the 1982 Connecticut gubernatorial election.)	Incumbent re-elected.	✓ William A. O'Neill (Democratic) 58.5%; Julie Belaga (Republican) 41.5%
Florida	Bob Graham	Democratic	1978	Incumbent term-limited. New governor elected. Republican gain.	✓ Bob Martinez (Republican) 54.6%; Steve Pajcic (Democratic) 45.4%
Georgia	Joe Frank Harris	Democratic	1982	Incumbent re-elected.	✓ Joe Frank Harris (Democratic) 70.5%; Guy Davis (Republican) 29.5%
Hawaii	George Ariyoshi	Democratic	1974	Incumbent term-limited. New governor elected. Democratic hold.	✓ John D. Waiheʻe III (Democratic) 52.0%; D. G. Anderson (Republican) 48.0%
Idaho	John Evans	Democratic	1978 (Note: Evans took office after his predecessor (Cecil Andrus) resigned.)	Incumbent retired. New governor elected. Democratic hold.	✓ Cecil Andrus (Democratic) 50.5%; David H. Leroy (Republican) 49.5%
Illinois	James R. Thompson	Republican	1976	Incumbent re-elected	✓ James R. Thompson (Republican) 52.7%; Adlai Stevenson III (Solidarity) 40.0%; No candidate (Note: Stevenson was originally the Democratic gubernatorial nominee but later withdrew when several Lyndon LaRouche supporters won spots on the Democratic ticket. See Solidarity Party for more details) (Democratic) 6.6%; Gary L. Shilts (Libertarian) 0.5%
Iowa	Terry Branstad	Republican	1982	Incumbent re-elected	✓ Terry Branstad (Republican) 51.9%; Lowell Junkins (Democratic) 48.0%
Kansas	John W. Carlin	Democratic	1978	Incumbent term-limited. New governor elected. Republican gain.	✓ Mike Hayden (Republican) 51.9%; Thomas R. Docking (Democratic) 48.1%
Maine	Joseph E. Brennan	Democratic	1978	Incumbent term-limited. New governor elected. Republican gain.	✓ John R. McKernan Jr. (Republican) 39.9%; James Tierney (Democratic) 30.2%; Sherry Huber (Independent) 15.1%; John Menario (Independent) 14.9%
Maryland	Harry Hughes	Democratic	1978	Incumbent term-limited. New governor elected. Democratic hold.	✓ William Donald Schaefer (Democratic) 82.4%; Thomas J. Mooney (Republican) 17.6%
Massachusetts	Michael Dukakis	Democratic	1974; 1978 (lost renomination); 1982	Incumbent re-elected	✓ Michael Dukakis (Democratic) 68.8%; George Kariotis (Republican) 31.2%
Michigan	James Blanchard	Democratic	1982	Incumbent re-elected	✓ James Blanchard (Democratic) 68.1%; William Lucas (Republican) 31.5%
Minnesota	Rudy Perpich	Democratic	1976 (Note: Perpich took office after his predecessor (Wendell R. Anderson) resigned.); 1978 (defeated); 1982	Incumbent re-elected	✓ Rudy Perpich (Democratic) 56.1%; Cal Ludeman (Republican) 43.1%
Nebraska	Bob Kerrey	Democratic	1982	Incumbent retired. New governor elected. Republican gain.	✓ Kay A. Orr (Republican) 52.9%; Helen Boosalis (Democratic) 47.1%
Nevada	Richard Bryan	Democratic	1982	Incumbent re-elected.	✓ Richard Bryan (Democratic) 71.9%; Patricia Dillon Cafferata (Republican) 25.0%; None of These Candidates 2.1%; Louis R. Tomburello (Libertarian) 1.0%
New Hampshire	John H. Sununu	Republican	1982	Incumbent re-elected.	✓ John H. Sununu (Republican) 53.7%; Paul McEachern (Democratic) 46.3%
New Mexico	Toney Anaya	Democratic	1982	Incumbent term-limited. New governor elected. Republican gain.	✓ Garrey Carruthers (Republican) 53.0%; Ray Powell (Democratic) 47.0%
New York	Mario Cuomo	Democratic	1982	Incumbent re-elected.	✓ Mario Cuomo (Democratic) 64.3%; Andrew P. O'Rourke (Republican) 31.8%; Denis Dillon (Right to Life) 3.1%; Lenora Fulani (New Alliance) 0.6%
Ohio	Dick Celeste	Democratic	1982	Incumbent re-elected.	✓ Dick Celeste (Democratic) 60.6%; Jim Rhodes (Republican) 39.4%
Oklahoma	George Nigh	Democratic	1978	Incumbent term-limited. New governor elected. Republican gain.	✓ Henry Bellmon (Republican) 48.1%; David Walters (Democratic) 45.2%; Jerry Brown (Independent) 6.7%
Oregon	Victor Atiyeh	Republican	1978	Incumbent term-limited. New governor elected. Democratic gain.	✓ Neil Goldschmidt (Democratic) 52.0%; Norma Paulus (Republican) 48.0%
Pennsylvania	Dick Thornburgh	Republican	1978	Incumbent term-limited. New governor elected. Democratic gain.	✓ Bob Casey Sr. (Democratic) 50.7%; William Scranton III (Republican) 48.4%; Heidi Hoover (Consumer) 1.0%
Rhode Island	Edward D. DiPrete	Republican	1984	Incumbent re-elected.	✓ Edward D. DiPrete (Republican) 64.7%; Bruce Sundlun (Democratic) 32.4%; Robert Healey (Cool Moose) 1.9%; Tony Affigne (Citizens) 1.1%
South Carolina	Richard Riley	Democratic	1978	Incumbent term-limited. New governor elected. Republican gain.	✓ Carroll A. Campbell Jr. (Republican) 51.0%; Michael R. Daniel (Democratic) 47.9%; William H. Griffin (Libertarian) 0.6%
South Dakota	Bill Janklow	Republican	1978	Incumbent term-limited. New governor elected. Republican hold.	✓ George S. Mickelson (Republican) 51.8%; Lars Herseth (Democratic) 48.2%
Tennessee	Lamar Alexander	Republican	1978	Incumbent term-limited. New governor elected. Democratic gain.	✓ Ned McWherter (Democratic) 54.3%; Winfield Dunn (Republican) 45.7%
Texas	Mark White	Democratic	1982	Incumbent lost re-election. New governor elected. Republican gain.	✓ Bill Clements (Republican) 52.7%; Mark White (Democratic) 46.0%; Theresa S. Doyle (Libertarian) 1.2%
Vermont	Madeleine Kunin	Democratic	1982	Incumbent re-elected. (Note: Kunin did not win a majority of the votes; therefore, the state assembly had to cast the final vote.)	✓ Madeleine Kunin (Democratic) 47.0%; Peter Plympton Smith (Republican) 38.3%; Bernie Sanders (Independent) 14.5%
Wisconsin	Tony Earl	Democratic	1982	Incumbent lost re-election. New governor elected. Republican gain.	✓ Tommy Thompson (Republican) 52.7%; Tony Earl (Democratic) 46.2%; Kathryn Christenson (Labor and Farm) 0.7%
Wyoming	Edward Herschler	Democratic	1974	Incumbent retired. New governor elected. Democratic hold.	✓ Mike Sullivan (Democratic) 54.0%; Pete Simpson (Republican) 46.0%

=== Territories and federal district ===
Territory	Incumbent	Party	First elected	Result	Candidates
District of Columbia	Marion Barry	Democratic	1978	Incumbent re-elected.	✓ Marion Barry (Democratic) 61.4%; Carol Schwartz (Republican) 32.8%; Brian Moore (Independent) 2.7%; Josephine D. Butler (Statehood Green) 1.7%
Guam	Ricardo Bordallo	Democratic	1982	Incumbent lost re-election. New governor elected. Republican gain.	✓ Joseph Franklin Ada (Republican) 53.8%; Ricardo Bordallo (Democratic) 46.2%
U.S. Virgin Islands	Juan Francisco Luis	Independent	1978	Incumbent term-limited. New governor elected. Democratic gain.	✓ Alexander Farrelly (Democratic) 65.4%; Adelbert Bryan (ICM) 34.6%

== Close states ==
States where the margin of victory was under 1%:

1. Idaho, 1.0%

States where the margin of victory was under 5%:

1. Pennsylvania, 2.3%
2. Oklahoma, 2.9%
3. South Carolina, 3.1%
4. South Dakota, 3.6%
5. Iowa, 3.9%
6. Hawaii, 4.0%
7. Oregon, 4.0%
8. Alaska, 4.7%

States where the margin of victory was under 10%:

1. Arizona, 5.2%
2. Nebraska, 5.8%
3. New Mexico, 6.0%
4. Wisconsin, 6.5%
5. Texas, 6.7%
6. New Hampshire, 7.4%
7. Guam, 7.6%
8. Wyoming, 8.0%
9. Tennessee, 8.6%
10. Vermont, 8.7%
11. Florida, 9.2%
12. Maine, 9.7%

== Alabama ==
1986 Alabama gubernatorial election
- November 4, 1986
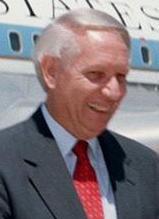

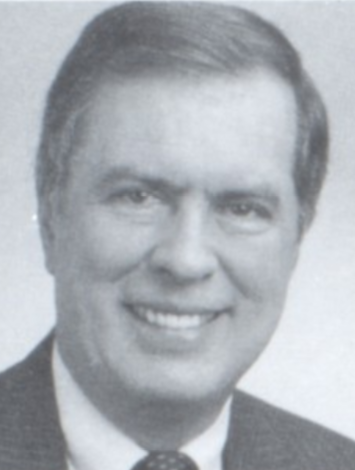
Nominee	H. Guy Hunt	Bill Baxley
Party	Republican	Democratic
Popular vote	696,203	537,163
Percentage	56.4%	43.6%
- County results Hunt: 50–60% 60–70% 70–80% Baxley: 50–60% 60–70% 70–80% 80–90%
Governor before election
George Wallace
Democratic
Elected Governor
H. Guy Hunt
Republican

The 1986 Alabama gubernatorial election saw the election of Republican H. Guy Hunt over Democrat Bill Baxley. In state politics, this election is largely seen as a realigning election since Hunt was the first Republican to be elected governor in 114 years – the last Republican to be elected was David P. Lewis in 1872 during the Reconstruction era. In March 1986, incumbent George Wallace announced that he would not seek a fifth term as governor, ending an era in Alabama politics.

== Alaska ==
1986 Alaska gubernatorial election
- November 6, 1986
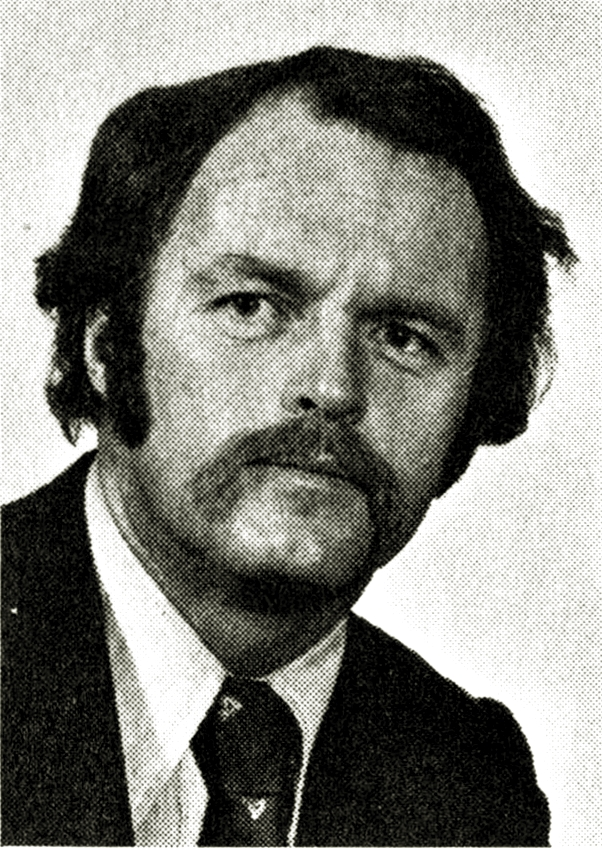

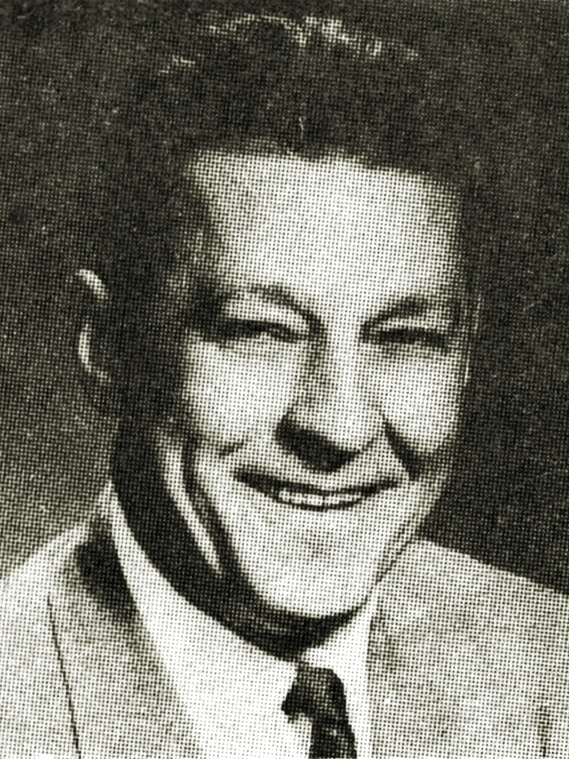
Nominee	Steve Cowper	Arliss Sturgulewski	Joe Vogler
Party	Democratic	Republican	Independence
Running mate	Steve McAlpine	Terry Miller	Al Rowe
Popular vote	84,943	76,515	10,013
Percentage	47.31%	42.61%	5.58%
- Results by state house district Cowper: 40–50% 50–60% 60–70% 70–80% Sturgulewski: 40–50% 50–60%
Governor before election
Bill Sheffield
Democratic
Elected Governor
Steve Cowper
Democratic

The 1986 Alaska gubernatorial election took place on November 4, 1986, for the post of Governor of Alaska. Incumbent Governor Bill Sheffield, a Democrat who was seeking re-election, was defeated by Steve Cowper in the Democratic primary election on August 26, 1986.

In the general election, Democratic state Representative Steve Cowper defeated Republican candidate Arliss Sturgulewski and Alaska Independence candidate Joe Vogler. Sturgulewski had defeated former governor Wally Hickel, former Libertarian nominee Dick Randolph, former State House Speaker Joe L. Hayes, and former Alaskan Independence nominee Don Wright for the Republican nomination.

== Arizona ==
1986 Arizona gubernatorial election
- November 4, 1986
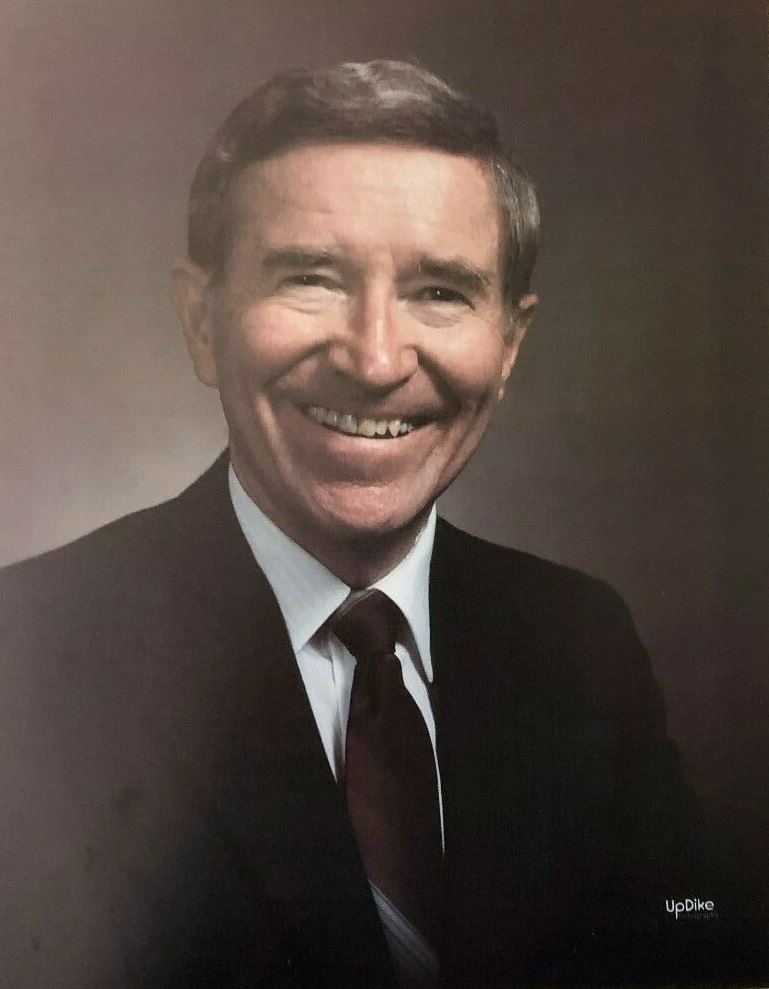

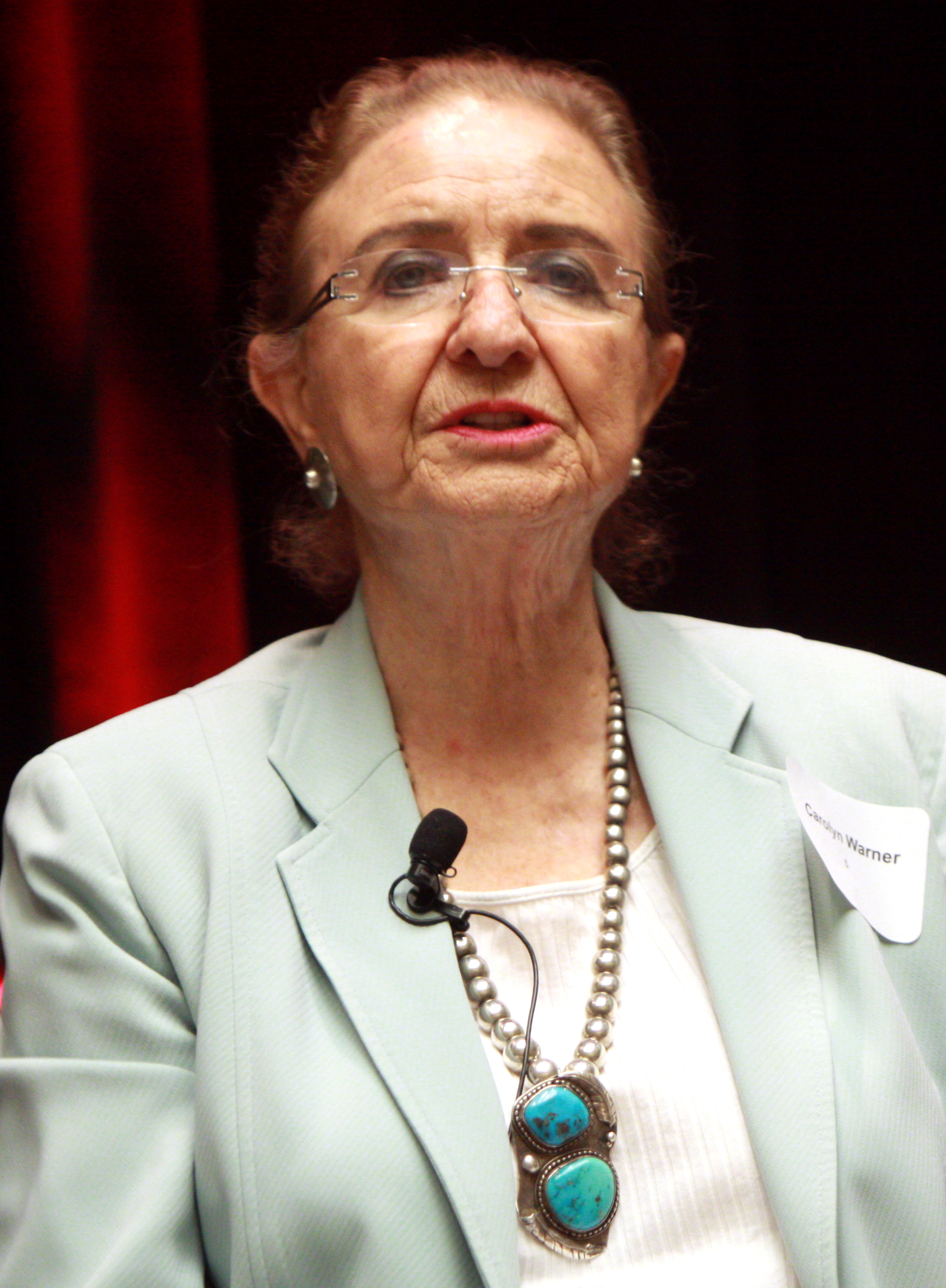

Nominee	Evan Mecham	Carolyn Warner	Bill Schulz
Party	Republican	Democratic	Independent
Popular vote	343,913	298,986	224,085
Percentage	39.67%	34.49%	25.85%
- County results Mecham: 30–40% 40–50% Warner: 40–50% 60–70%
Governor before election
Bruce Babbitt
Democratic
Elected Governor
Evan Mecham
Republican

The 1986 Arizona gubernatorial election took place on November 4, 1986, for the post of Governor of Arizona. Republican Evan Mecham, who defeated Burton Barr for the Republican nomination, defeated the Democratic nominee and State Superintendent Carolyn Warner and independent candidate Bill Schulz.

== Arkansas ==
1986 Arkansas gubernatorial election
- November 4, 1986
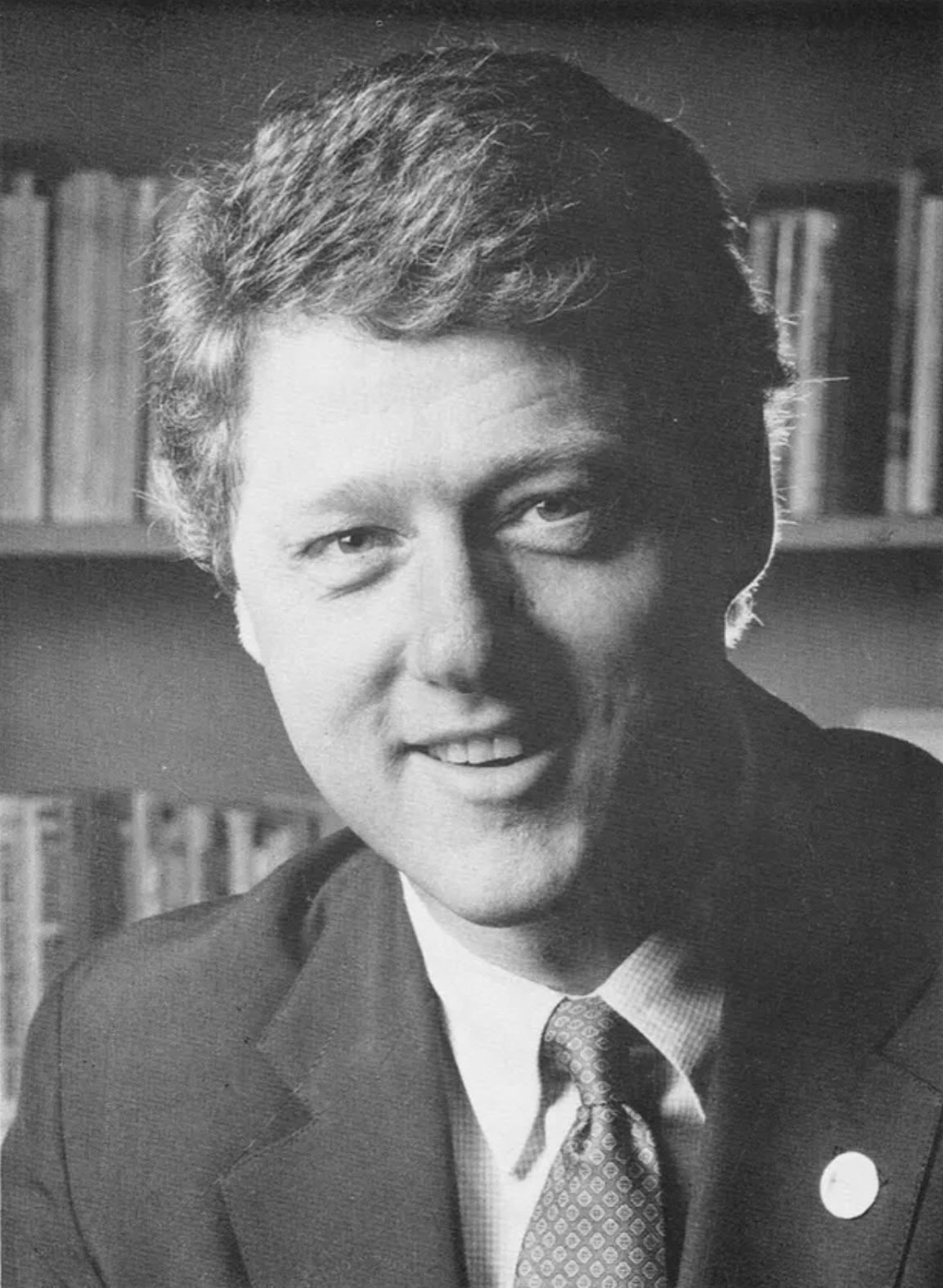

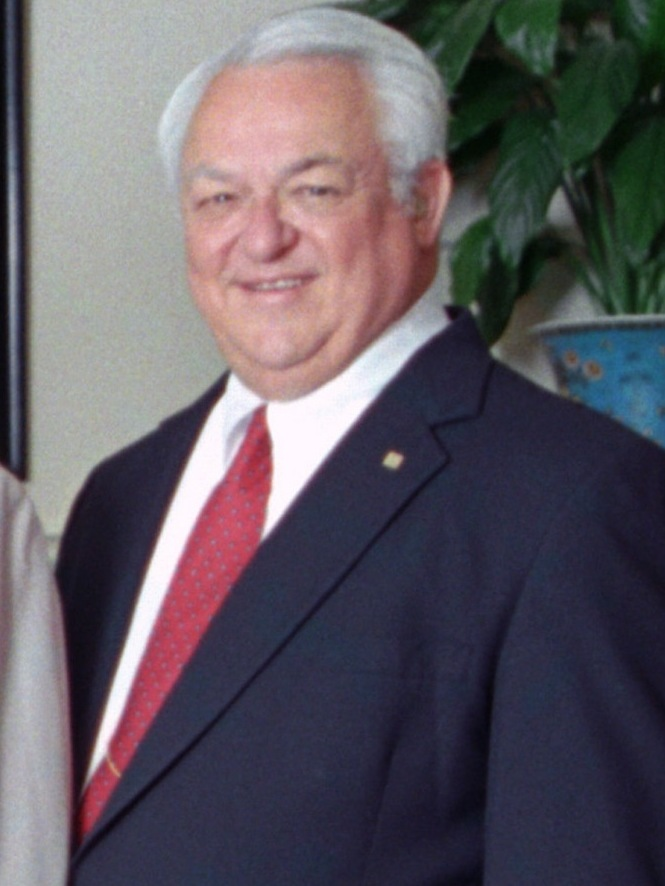
Nominee	Bill Clinton	Frank D. White
Party	Democratic	Republican
Popular vote	439,802	248,427
Percentage	63.90%	36.10%
- County results Clinton: 50–60% 60–70% 70–80% White: 50–60% 60–70%
Governor before election
Bill Clinton
Democratic
Elected Governor
Bill Clinton
Democratic

The 1986 Arkansas gubernatorial election was conducted on November 4, 1986, to elect the Governor of Arkansas. Incumbent Democratic Governor Bill Clinton stood for re-election. He had been elected in 1982 and re-elected in 1984, and sought a third consecutive term and fourth overall (Clinton had been first elected in 1978). His opponent was former Republican Governor Frank D. White, who was seeking to return to the office he had defeated Clinton for in the 1980 election.

Clinton had defeated former Governor Orval Faubus for the Democratic nomination, while White defeated former Lieutenant Governor Maurice Britt in the Republican primary.

== California ==
1986 California gubernatorial election
- November 4, 1986
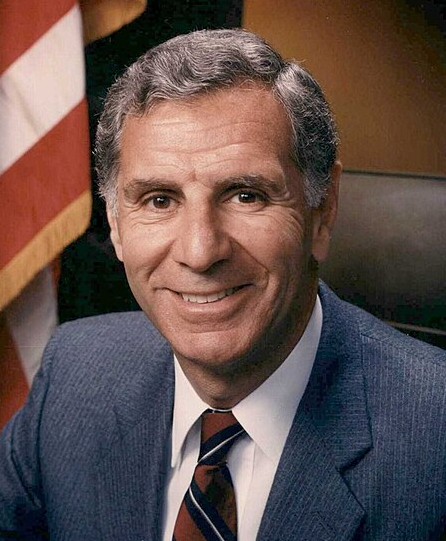

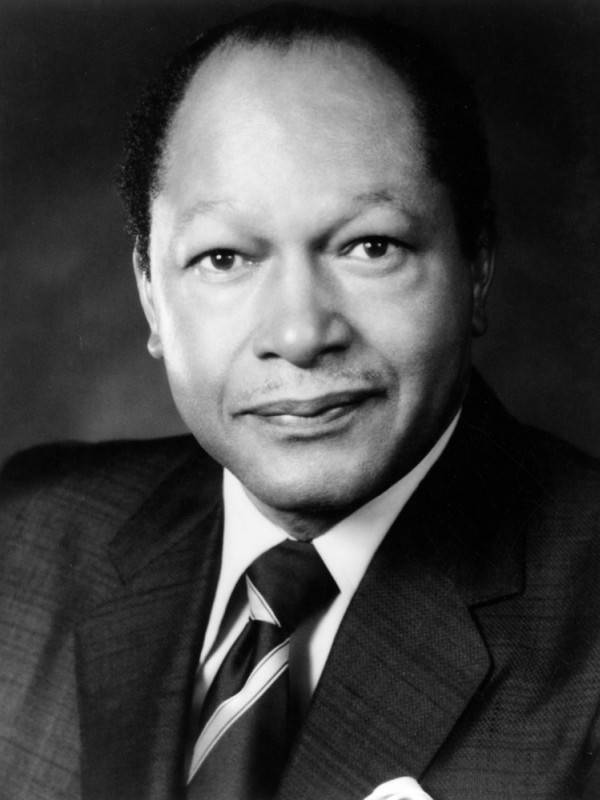
Nominee	George Deukmejian	Tom Bradley
Party	Republican	Democratic
Popular vote	4,505,601	2,781,714
Percentage	60.54%	37.38%
- Deukmejian: 40-50% 50–60% 60–70% 70–80% 80–90% Bradley: 40–50% 50–60% 60–70% 70–80%
Governor before election
George Deukmejian
Republican
Elected Governor
George Deukmejian
Republican

The 1986 California gubernatorial election took place on November 4, 1986. Incumbent Republican George Deukmejian won easily in this rematch over the Democratic challenger, Los Angeles Mayor Tom Bradley. This was the largest gubernatorial victory since that of Earl Warren in 1946, who won 91.64% of the vote.

== Colorado ==
1986 Colorado gubernatorial election
- November 4, 1986
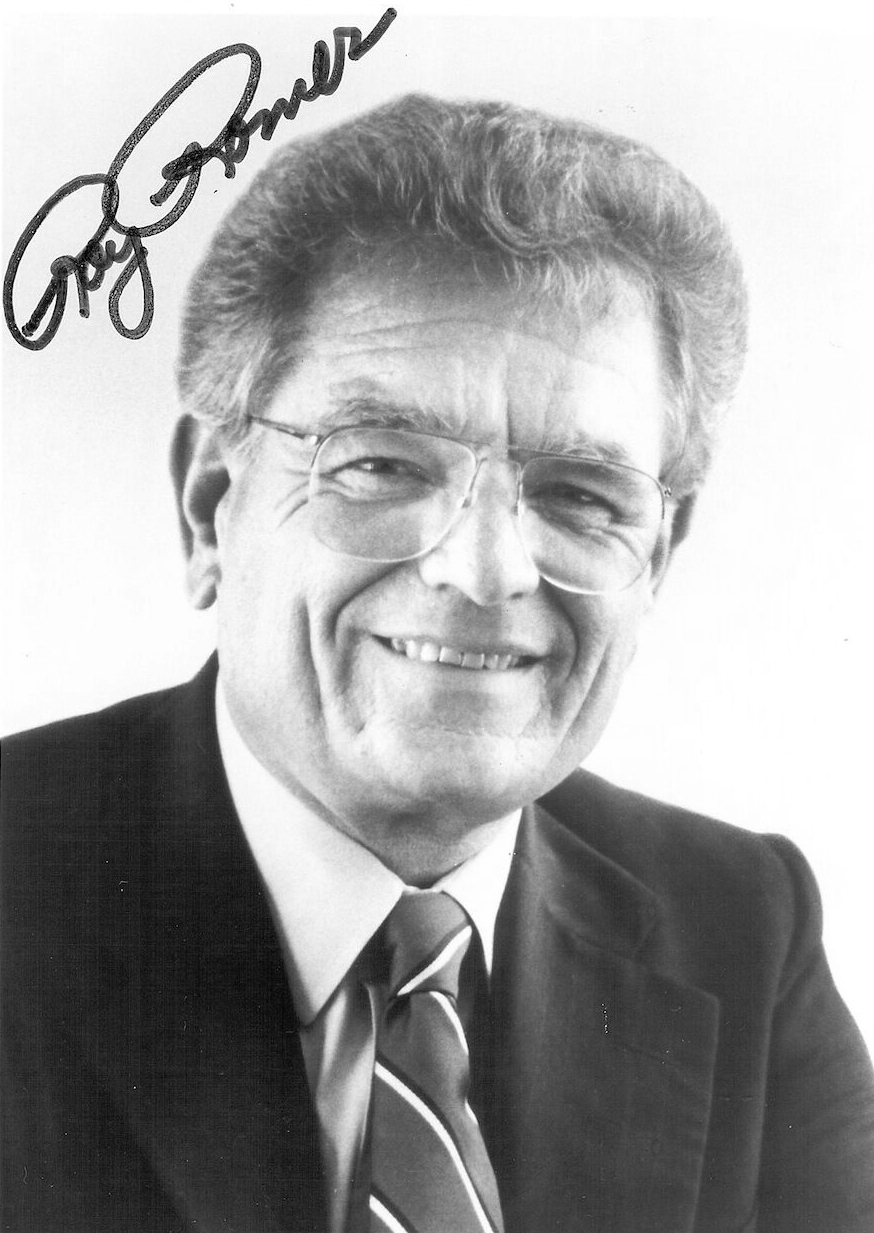

Nominee	Roy Romer	Ted L. Strickland
Party	Democratic	Republican
Running mate	Mike Callihan	Kathy Arnold
Popular vote	616,325	434,420
Percentage	58.20%	41.03%
- County results Romer: 40–50% 50–60% 60–70% 70–80% Strickland: 40–50% 50–60% 60–70%
Governor before election
Richard Lamm
Democratic
Elected Governor
Roy Romer
Democratic

The 1986 Colorado gubernatorial election was held on November 4, 1986. Democratic nominee Roy Romer defeated Republican nominee Ted L. Strickland with 58.20% of the vote.

== Connecticut ==
1986 Connecticut gubernatorial election
- November 4, 1986

Nominee	Bill O'Neill	Julie Belaga
Party	Democratic	Republican
Running mate	Joseph J. Fauliso	E. Clayton Gengras, Jr.
Popular vote	575,638	408,489
Percentage	57.93%	41.11%
- O'Neill: 40–50% 50–60% 60–70% 70–80% Belaga: 40–50% 50–60% 60–70% 70–80% Tie
Governor before election
Bill O'Neill
Democratic
Elected Governor
Bill O'Neill
Democratic

The 1986 Connecticut gubernatorial election took place on November 4, 1986. Incumbent Democratic governor Bill O'Neill won his second full term against Republican assemblywoman Julie Belaga, who defeated Jerry Labriola for the Republican nomination. This election marked the last time a Democrat would win the governorship in Connecticut until the 2010 election, the last time a Democratic gubernatorial candidate has won every county in the state and the last time a Democrat won by a margin of larger than 5 percent until the 2022 election.

== Florida ==
1986 Florida gubernatorial election
- November 4, 1986
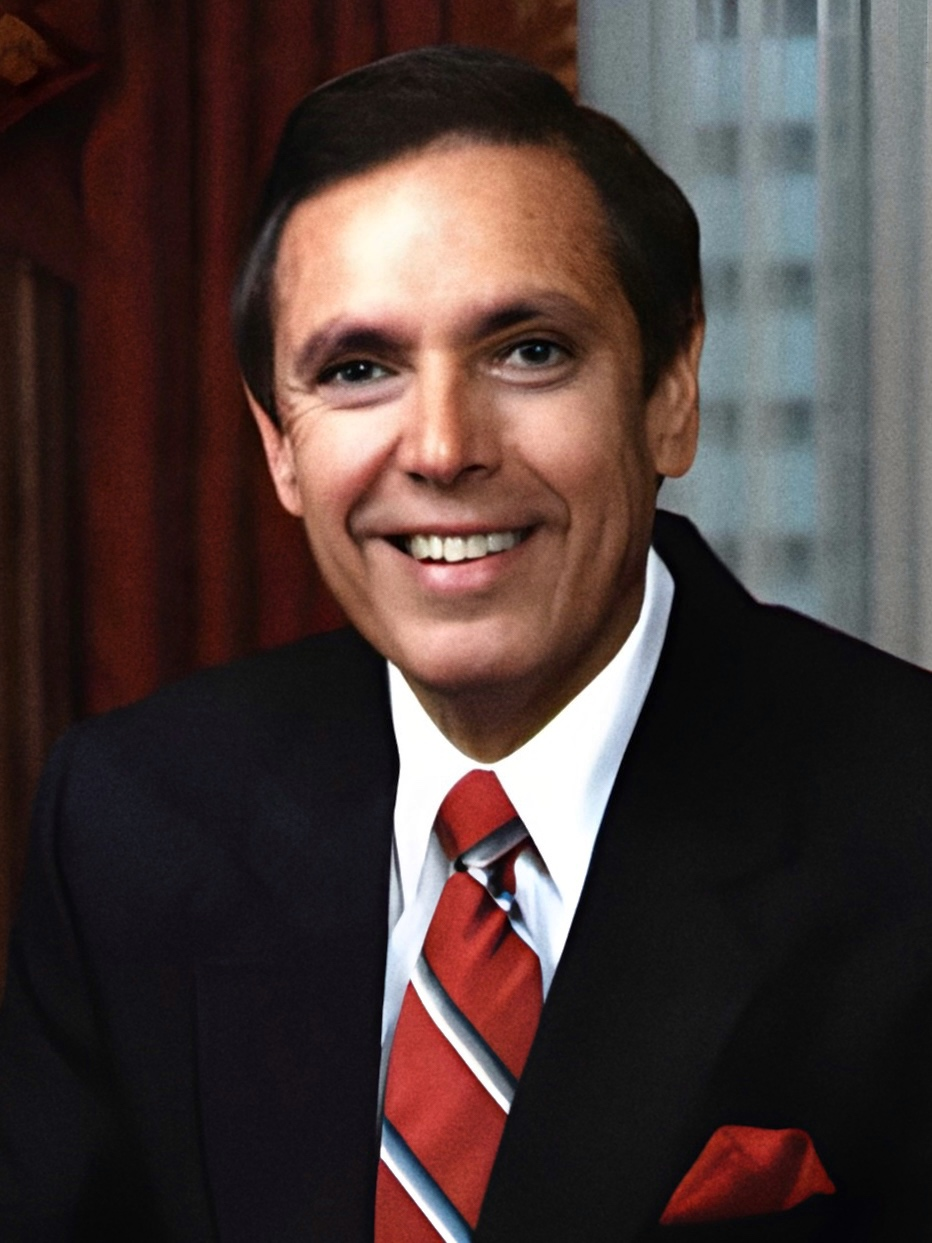

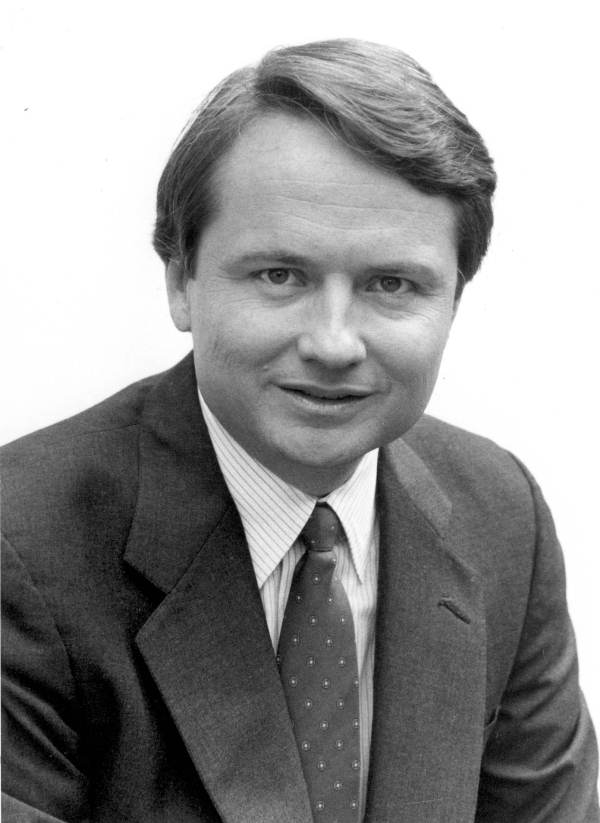
Nominee	Bob Martinez	Steve Pajcic
Party	Republican	Democratic
Running mate	Bobby Brantley	Franklin B. Mann
Popular vote	1,847,525	1,538,620
Percentage	54.6%	45.4%
- County results Martinez: 50–60% 60–70% 70–80% Pajcic: 50–60% 60–70%
Governor before election
Bob Graham
Democratic
Elected Governor
Bob Martinez
Republican

The 1986 Florida gubernatorial election took place alongside the midterm congressional elections. The Democratic Party won many victories across the country (including retaking the Senate). However, in Florida, where Democrats gained the Senate seat from Republicans, they lost the Governorship for just the second time since Reconstruction.

== Georgia ==
1986 Georgia gubernatorial election
- November 4, 1986
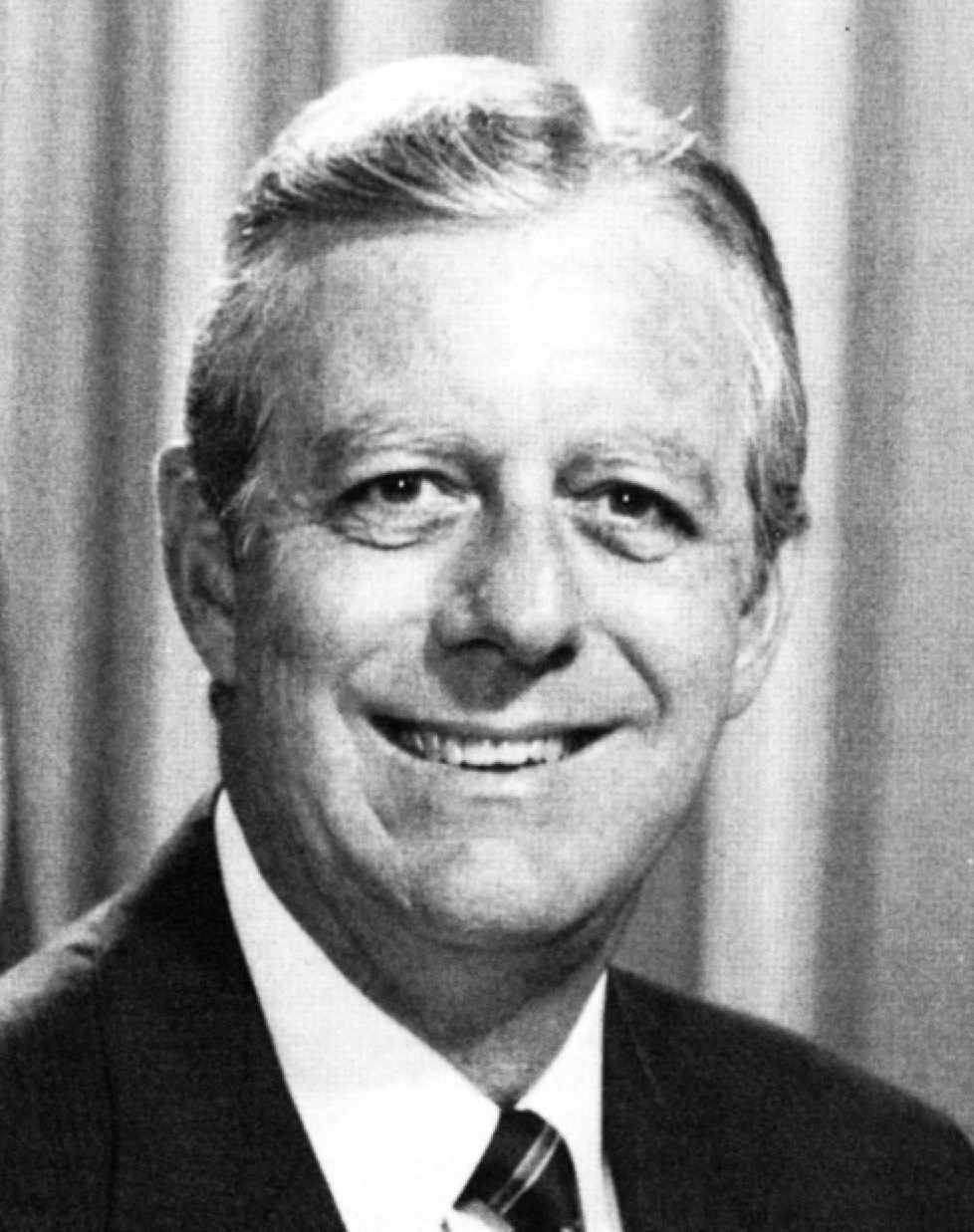

Nominee	Joe Frank Harris	Guy Davis
Party	Democratic	Republican
Popular vote	828,465	346,512
Percentage	70.51%	29.49%
- County results Harris: 50–60% 60–70% 70–80% 80–90%
Governor before election
Joe Frank Harris
Democratic
Elected Governor
Joe Frank Harris
Democratic

The 1986 Georgia gubernatorial election was held on November 4, 1986. Governor Joe Frank Harris (D) was overwhelmingly re-elected over Guy Davis (R) to win re-election.

== Hawaii ==
1986 Hawaii gubernatorial election
- November 4, 1986
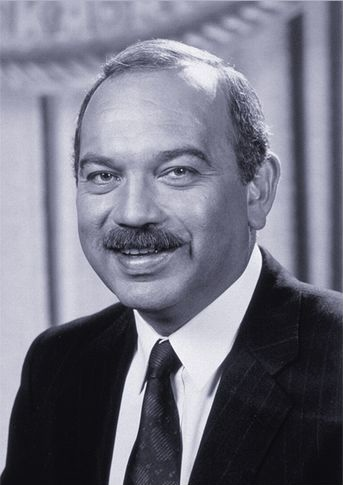

Nominee	John D. Waiheʻe III	D. G. Anderson
Party	Democratic	Republican
Running mate	Ben Cayetano	John Henry Felix
Popular vote	173,655	160,460
Percentage	52.0%	48.0%
- County results Waiheʻe: 50–60%
Governor before election
George Ariyoshi
Democratic
Elected Governor
John D. Waiheʻe III
Democratic

The 1986 Hawaii gubernatorial election was Hawaii's eighth gubernatorial election. The election was held on November 4, 1986, and resulted in a victory for the Democratic candidate, Lt. Gov. John D. Waiheʻe III over the Republican candidate, State Senator D. G. Anderson.

== Idaho ==
1986 Idaho gubernatorial election
- November 4, 1986
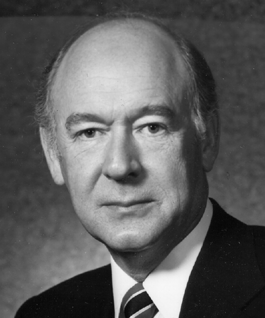

Nominee	Cecil Andrus	David Leroy
Party	Democratic	Republican
Popular vote	193,429	189,794
Percentage	49.9%	49.0%
- County results Andrus: 50–60% 60–70% 70–80% Leroy: 50–60% 60–70%
Governor before election
John V. Evans
Democratic
Elected Governor
Cecil Andrus
Democratic

The 1986 Idaho gubernatorial election was held on November 4, 1986 to elect the governor of the state of Idaho. Cecil Andrus, a former Democratic governor, was elected defeating the Republican Lieutenant Governor David Leroy.

This was an open seat election; longtime incumbent John V. Evans ran for the U.S. Senate, but lost. This was the first open-seat gubernatorial election in Idaho or the first open-seat Idaho gubernatorial election since 1954.

== Illinois ==
1986 Illinois gubernatorial election
- November 4, 1986
- Turnout: 52.37% ▼9.21 pp
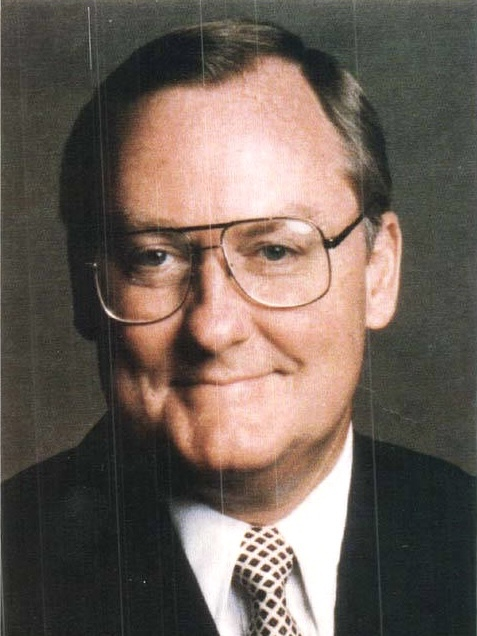

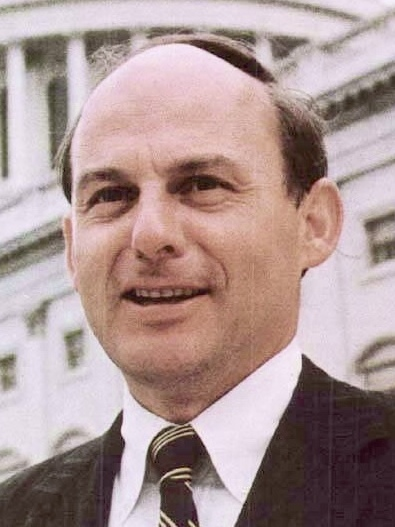

Nominee	Jim Thompson	Adlai Stevenson III	No nominee
Party	Republican	Illinois Solidarity	Democratic
Running mate	George Ryan	Mike Howlett	Mark Fairchild
Popular vote	1,655,849	1,256,626	208,830
Percentage	52.67%	39.97%	6.64%
- Thompson: 40-50% 50-60% 60-70% 70-80% 80-90% Stevenson: 40-50% 50-60% 60-70% 70-80% 80-90% Tie: 30-40% 40-50%
Governor before election
James R. Thompson
Republican
Elected Governor
James R. Thompson
Republican

The 1986 Illinois gubernatorial election was held on November 4, 1986. Republican candidate James R. Thompson won a fourth term in office, defeating the Illinois Solidarity Party nominee, former United States Senator Adlai Stevenson III, by around 400,000 votes.

== Iowa ==
1986 Iowa gubernatorial election
- November 4, 1986
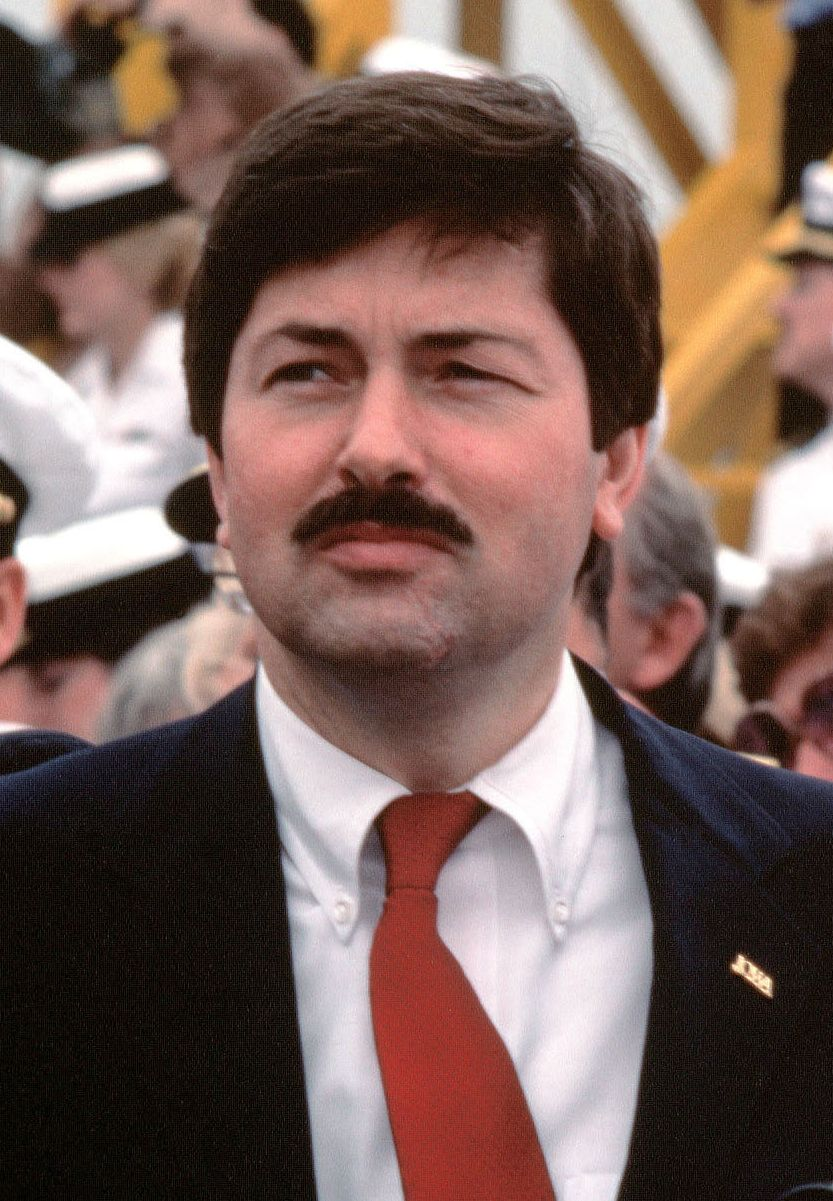

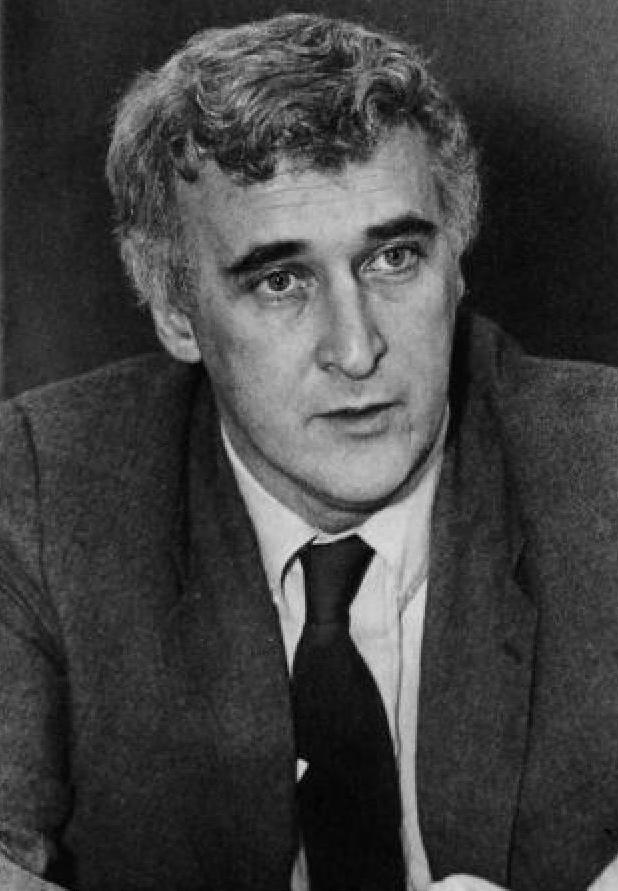
Nominee	Terry Branstad	Lowell Junkins
Party	Republican	Democratic
Popular vote	472,712	436,987
Percentage	51.9%	48.0%
- County results Branstad: 50–60% 60–70% 70–80% Junkins: 50–60% 60–70%
Governor before election
Terry Branstad
Republican
Elected Governor
Terry Branstad
Republican

The 1986 Iowa gubernatorial election was held on November 4, 1986. Incumbent Republican Terry Branstad defeated Democratic nominee Lowell Junkins with 51.91% of the vote.

== Kansas ==
1986 Kansas gubernatorial election
- November 4, 1986
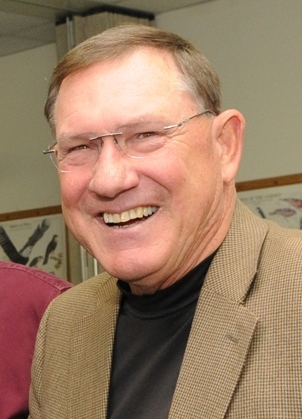

Nominee	Mike Hayden	Thomas Docking
Party	Republican	Democratic
Popular vote	436,267	404,338
Percentage	51.9%	48.1%
- County results Hayden: 50–60% 60–70% 70–80% 80–90% Docking: 50–60% 60–70%
Governor before election
John W. Carlin
Democratic
Elected Governor
Mike Hayden
Republican

The 1986 Kansas gubernatorial election was held on November 4, 1986. Incumbent Democratic Governor John W. Carlin did not run for re-election. Republican nominee Mike Hayden, then Speaker of the Kansas House of Representatives, beat the Democratic nominee Thomas Docking, who was then the incumbent Lieutenant Governor of Kansas. This was the last gubernatorial election in Kansas in which the winner was of the same party as the incumbent president until Laura Kelly's victory in 2022.

== Maine ==
1986 Maine gubernatorial election
- November 4, 1986
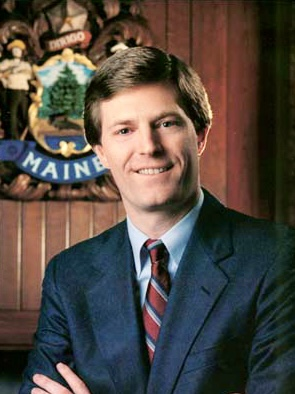

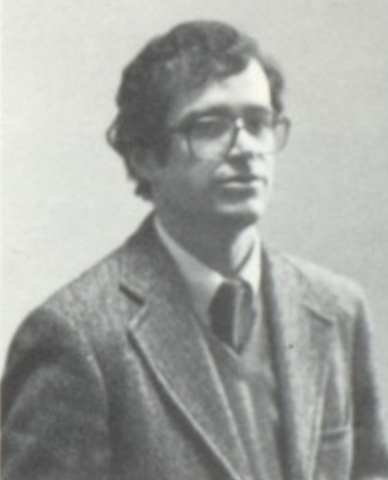
Nominee	John McKernan	James Tierney
Party	Republican	Democratic
Popular vote	170,312	128,744
Percentage	39.9%	30.2%
Nominee	Sherry Huber	John Menario
Party	Independent	Independent
Popular vote	64,317	63,474
Percentage	15.1%	14.9%
- County results McKernan: 30–40% 40–50% Tierney: 30–40%
Governor before election
Joseph Brennan
Democratic
Elected Governor
John McKernan
Republican

The 1986 Maine gubernatorial election took place on November 4, 1986. Incumbent Democratic Governor Joseph Brennan was term limited and ineligible to seek re-election. First district Congressman John McKernan defeated Democratic Party challenger James Tierney as well as former Republican turned Independent Sherry Huber and former Portland, Maine, city manager John Menario, making McKernan the first Republican to win The Blaine House since 1962.

== Maryland ==
1986 Maryland gubernatorial election
- November 4, 1986
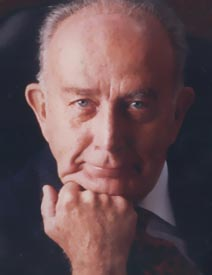

Nominee	William Donald Schaefer	Thomas J. Mooney
Party	Democratic	Republican
Running mate	Melvin Steinberg	Melvin A. Bilal
Popular vote	907,291	194,185
Percentage	82.37%	17.63%
- County results Schaefer: 60-70% 70-80% 80-90% >90%
Governor before election
Harry Hughes
Democratic
Elected Governor
William Donald Schaefer
Democratic

The 1986 Maryland gubernatorial election was held on November 4, 1986. Democratic nominee William Donald Schaefer defeated Republican nominee Thomas J. Mooney with 82.37% of the vote.

== Massachusetts ==
1986 Massachusetts gubernatorial election
- November 3, 1986
- Turnout: 57.41% ▼25.1
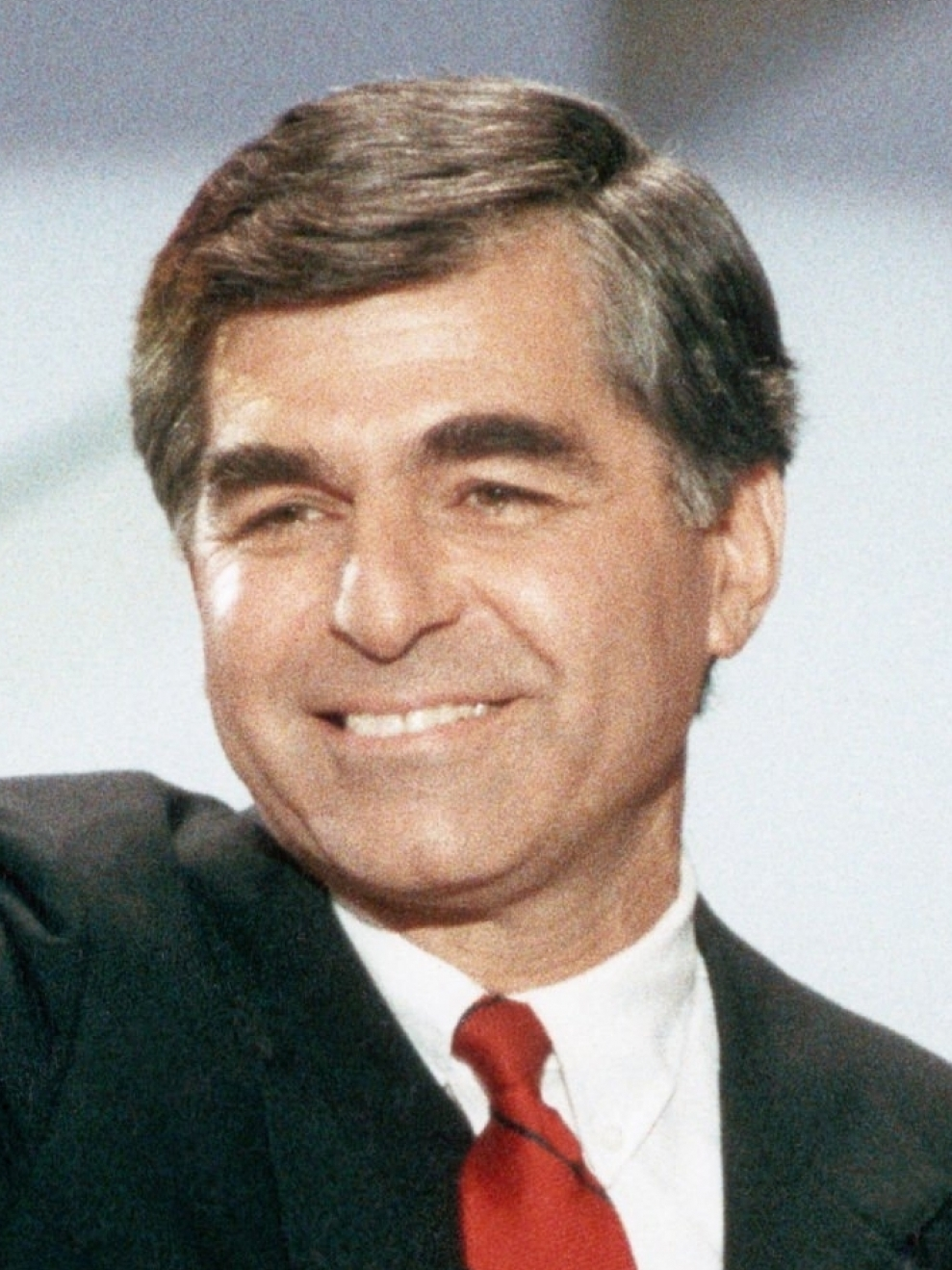

Nominee	Michael Dukakis	George Kariotis
Party	Democratic	Republican
Running mate	Evelyn Murphy	Nicholas Nikitas
Popular vote	1,157,786	525,364
Percentage	68.79%	31.21%
- Dukakis: 50–60% 60–70% 70–80% 80–90% Kariotis: 50–60% 70–80%
Governor before election
Michael Dukakis
Democratic
Elected Governor
Michael Dukakis
Democratic

The 1986 Massachusetts gubernatorial election was held on November 4, 1986. Michael Dukakis was elected Governor of Massachusetts for a third term. He defeated Republican George Kariotis by a 69–31% margin. This was the last time a Democrat was elected governor of Massachusetts until 2006.

== Michigan ==
1986 Michigan gubernatorial election
- November 4, 1986
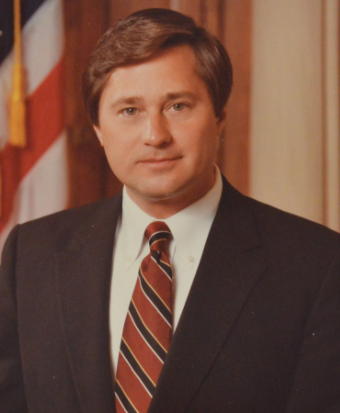

Nominee	James Blanchard	William Lucas
Party	Democratic	Republican
Popular vote	1,632,138	753,647
Percentage	68.10%	31.45%
- Blanchard: 50–60% 60–70% 70–80% 80–90% >90% Lucas: 50–60% 60–70% 70–80% 80–90%
Governor before election
James Blanchard
Democratic
Elected Governor
James Blanchard
Democratic

The 1986 Michigan gubernatorial election was held on November 4.

The primary elections occurred on August 6, 1986. The Democrats nominated incumbent governor James Blanchard. The Republicans nominated Wayne County executive William Lucas, who made history by being the first African-American nominee by either major party for Governor of Michigan.

Blanchard was re-elected by a landslide, winning the election with 68.1% of the vote.

== Minnesota ==
1986 Minnesota gubernatorial election
- November 4, 1986
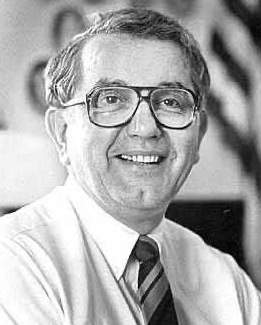

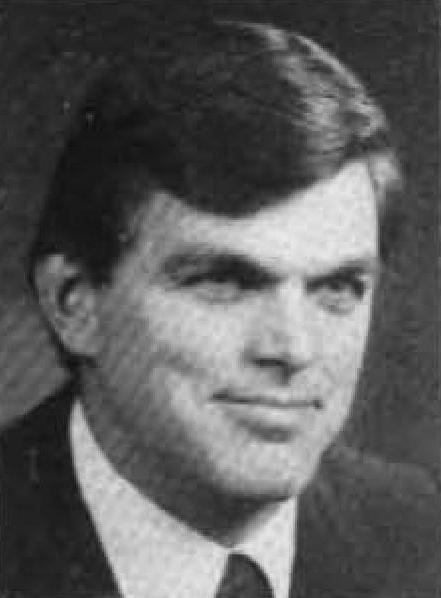
Nominee	Rudy Perpich	Cal Ludeman
Party	Democratic (DFL)	Ind.-Republican
Running mate	Marlene Johnson	Dennis W. Schulstad
Popular vote	790,138	606,755
Percentage	56.11%	43.09%
- County results Perpich: 40–50% 50–60% 60–70% 70–80% 80–90% Ludeman: 40–50% 50–60% 60–70%
Governor before election
Rudy Perpich
Democratic (DFL)
Elected Governor
Rudy Perpich
Democratic (DFL)

The 1986 Minnesota gubernatorial election took place on November 4, 1986. Minnesota Democratic–Farmer–Labor Party candidate Rudy Perpich defeated Independent-Republican Party challenger Cal Ludeman. George Latimer unsuccessfully ran for the Democratic nomination.

Democrats would not win another gubernatorial election in the state until 2010.

== Nebraska ==
1986 Nebraska gubernatorial election
- November 4, 1986
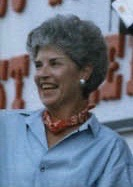

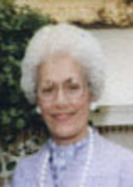
Nominee	Kay Orr	Helen Boosalis
Party	Republican	Democratic
Running mate	Bill Nichol	Donald McGinley
Popular vote	298,325	265,156
Percentage	52.9%	47.0%
- County results Orr: 40-50% 50-60% 60-70% 70-80% 80-90% Boosalis: 50–60% 60–70%
Governor before election
Bob Kerrey
Democratic
Elected Governor
Kay Orr
Republican

The 1986 Nebraska gubernatorial election was held on November 4, 1986, and featured state Treasurer Kay Orr, a Republican, defeating Democratic nominee, former Mayor of Lincoln Helen Boosalis. Incumbent Democratic governor Bob Kerrey did not seek a second term.

The election was the first state gubernatorial election in U.S. history where the candidates of both major national parties were women.

== Nevada ==
1986 Nevada gubernatorial election
- November 4, 1986
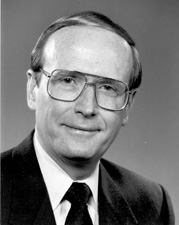

Nominee	Richard Bryan	Patty Cafferata
Party	Democratic	Republican
Popular vote	187,268	65,081
Percentage	73.5%	25.5%
- County results Bryan: 50–60% 60–70% 70–80% 80–90%
Governor before election
Richard Bryan
Democratic
Elected Governor
Richard Bryan
Democratic

The 1986 Nevada gubernatorial election took place on November 4, 1986. Incumbent Democrat Richard Bryan won re-election to a second term as Governor of Nevada, defeating Republican nominee Patty Cafferata.

== New Hampshire ==
1986 New Hampshire gubernatorial election
- November 4, 1986
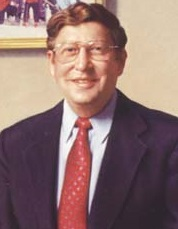

Nominee	John H. Sununu	Paul McEachern
Party	Republican	Democratic
Popular vote	134,824	116,142
Percentage	53.72%	46.28%
- Sununu: 50–60% 60–70% 70–80% 80–90% >90% McEachern: 50–60% 60–70% 70–80% >90%
Governor before election
John H. Sununu
Republican
Elected Governor
John H. Sununu
Republican

The 1986 New Hampshire gubernatorial election took place on November 4, 1986. Incumbent Governor John Sununu was re-elected to a third term in office, defeating Paul McEachern, who had defeated Paul M. Gagnon for the Democratic nomination.

== New Mexico ==
1986 New Mexico gubernatorial election
- November 4, 1986
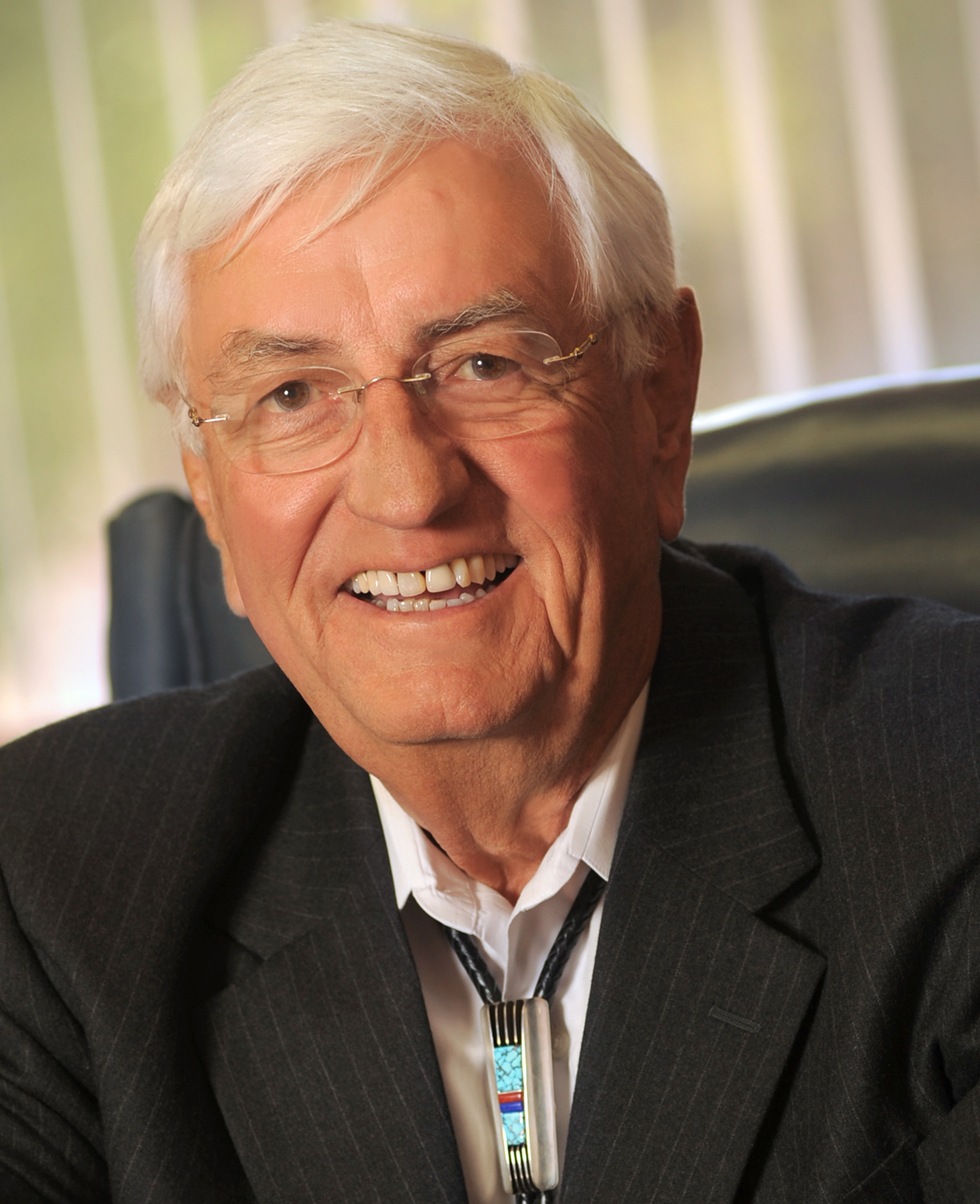

Nominee	Garrey Carruthers	Ray Powell
Party	Republican	Democratic
Popular vote	209,455	185,378
Percentage	53.05%	46.95%
- County results Carruthers: 50–60% 60–70% 70–80% Powell: 50–60% 60–70%
Governor before election
Toney Anaya
Democratic
Elected Governor
Garrey Carruthers
Republican

The 1986 New Mexico gubernatorial election took place on November 4, 1986, in order to elect the governor of New Mexico. Due to term limits, incumbent Democratic governor Toney Anaya was ineligible to seek a second term as governor.

== New York ==
1986 New York gubernatorial election
- November 4, 1986
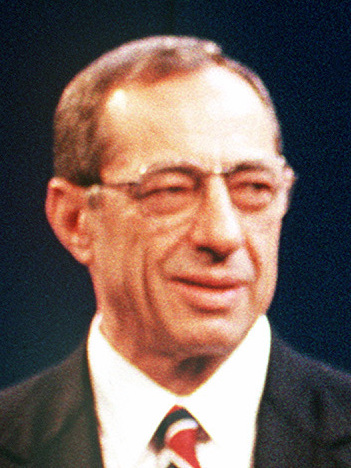

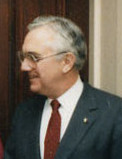
Nominee	Mario Cuomo	Andrew O'Rourke
Party	Democratic	Republican
Alliance	Liberal	Conservative
Running mate	Stan Lundine	E. Michael Kavanagh
Popular vote	2,775,045	1,363,968
Percentage	64.63%	31.77%
- County results Cuomo: 40–50% 50–60% 60–70% 70–80% 80–90% O'Rourke: 40–50% 50–60%
Governor before election
Mario Cuomo
Democratic
Elected Governor
Mario Cuomo
Democratic

The 1986 New York gubernatorial election was held on November 4, 1986, to elect the Governor and Lieutenant Governor of New York. Incumbent Democratic governor Mario Cuomo defeated Republican Andrew O'Rourke, the County Executive of Westchester County in a landslide. Cuomo carried all but 5 counties.

== Ohio ==
1986 Ohio gubernatorial election
- November 4, 1986
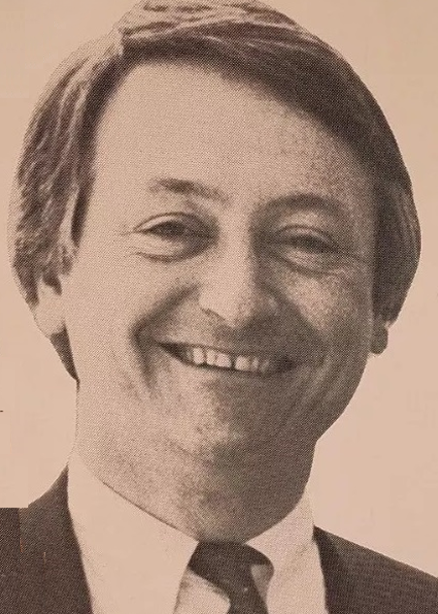

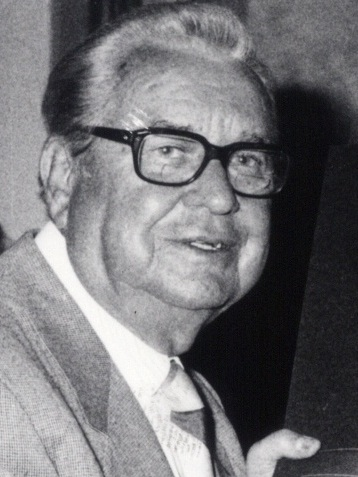
Nominee	Dick Celeste	Jim Rhodes
Party	Democratic	Republican
Popular vote	1,858,372	1,207,264
Percentage	60.6%	39.4%
- Celeste: 50–60% 60–70% 70–80% 80–90% >90% Rhodes: 50–60% 60–70% 70–80% 80–90%
Governor before election
Dick Celeste
Democratic
Elected Governor
Dick Celeste
Democratic

The 1986 Ohio gubernatorial election was held on November 4, 1986. Incumbent Democratic Governor Dick Celeste ran against four time former Governor Jim Rhodes, who had previously defeated the last two incumbent Democratic governors in 1962 and 1974.

== Oklahoma ==
1986 Oklahoma gubernatorial election
- November 4, 1986
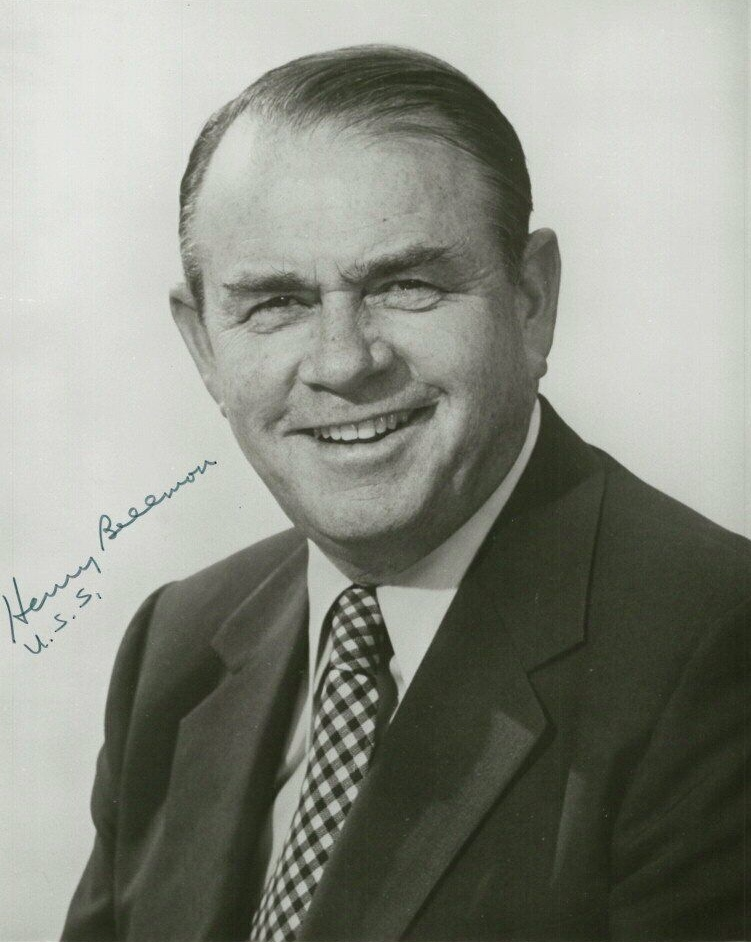

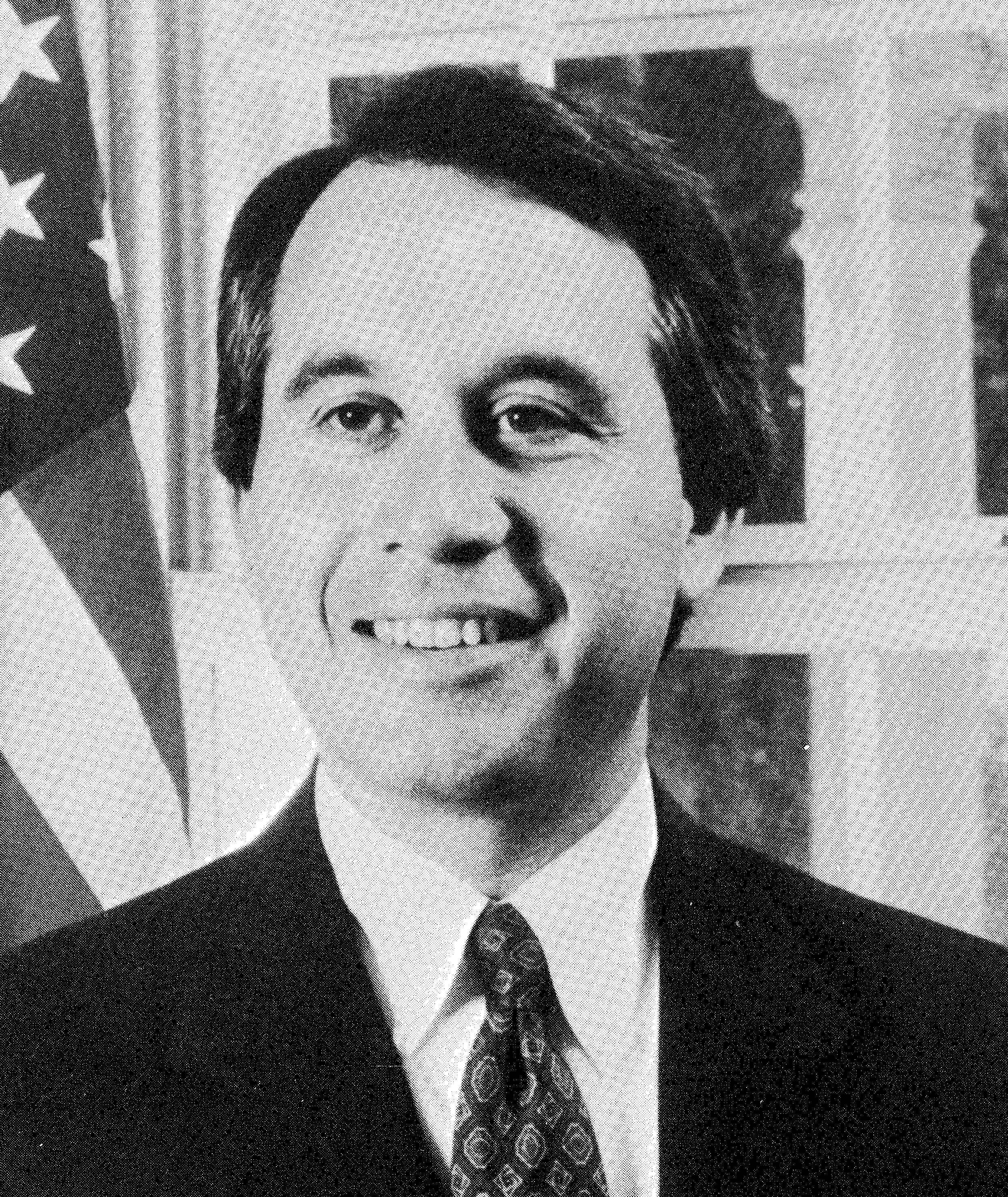

Nominee	Henry Bellmon	David Walters	Jerry Brown
Party	Republican	Democratic	Independent
Popular vote	431,762	405,295	60,115
Percentage	47.4%	44.5%	6.6%
- County results Bellmon: 40-50% 50-60% 60-70% 70-80% Walters: 40–50% 50–60% 60–70%
Governor before election
George Nigh
Democratic
Elected Governor
Henry Bellmon
Republican

The 1986 Oklahoma gubernatorial election was held on November 4, 1986, to elect the governor of Oklahoma. Republican former Governor and Senator Henry Bellmon won the election by a plurality with Independent Jerry Brown receiving more than twice the number of votes separating Bellmon from Democrat David Walters.

== Oregon ==
1986 Oregon gubernatorial election
- November 4, 1986
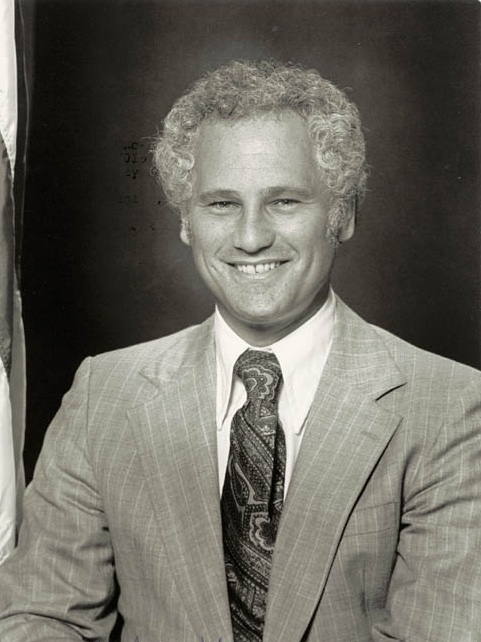

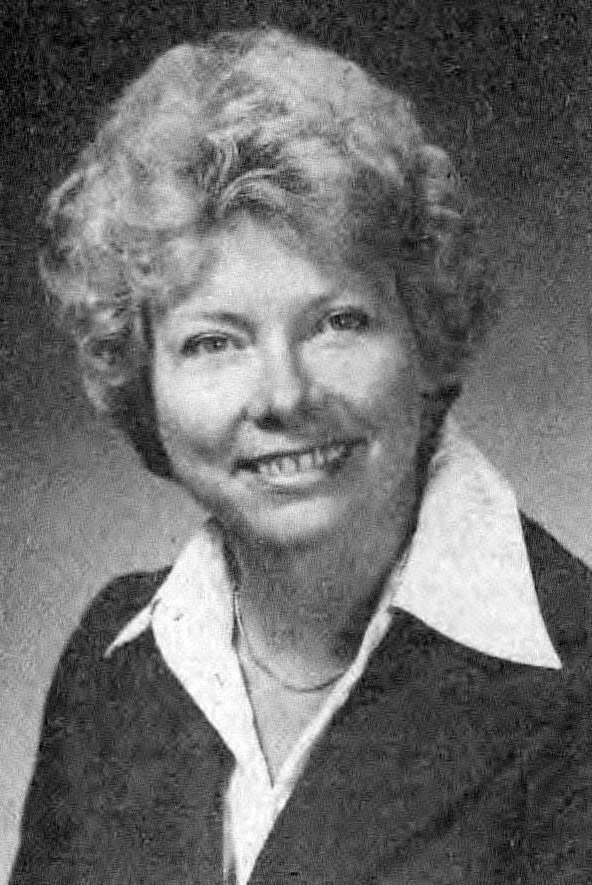
Nominee	Neil Goldschmidt	Norma Paulus
Party	Democratic	Republican
Popular vote	549,456	506,989
Percentage	51.9%	47.9%
- County results Goldschmidt: 50–60% Paulus: 50–60% 60–70% 70–80%
Governor before election
Victor Atiyeh
Republican
Elected Governor
Neil Goldschmidt
Democratic

The 1986 Oregon gubernatorial election took place on November 4, 1986. Democratic nominee Neil Goldschmidt defeated Republican Norma Paulus to win the election.

== Pennsylvania ==
1986 Pennsylvania gubernatorial election
- November 4, 1986
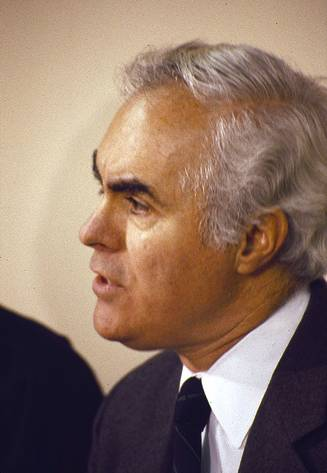

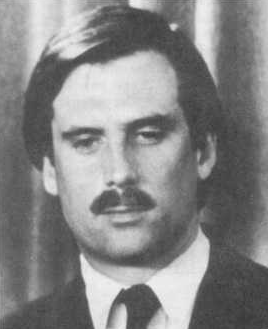
Nominee	Bob Casey	Bill Scranton III
Party	Democratic	Republican
Running mate	Mark Singel	Mike Fisher
Popular vote	1,717,484	1,638,268
Percentage	50.69%	48.34%
- Casey: 50–60% 60–70% 70–80% 80–90% >90% Scranton: 40–50% 50–60% 60–70% 70–80% 80–90% >90% Tie
Governor before election
Dick Thornburgh
Republican
Elected Governor
Robert P. Casey
Democratic

The 1986 Pennsylvania gubernatorial election was held on November 4, 1986. Democrat Bob Casey narrowly defeated Republican Bill Scranton III, in a race that featured two very high-profile candidates.

== Rhode Island ==
1986 Rhode Island gubernatorial election
- November 4, 1986
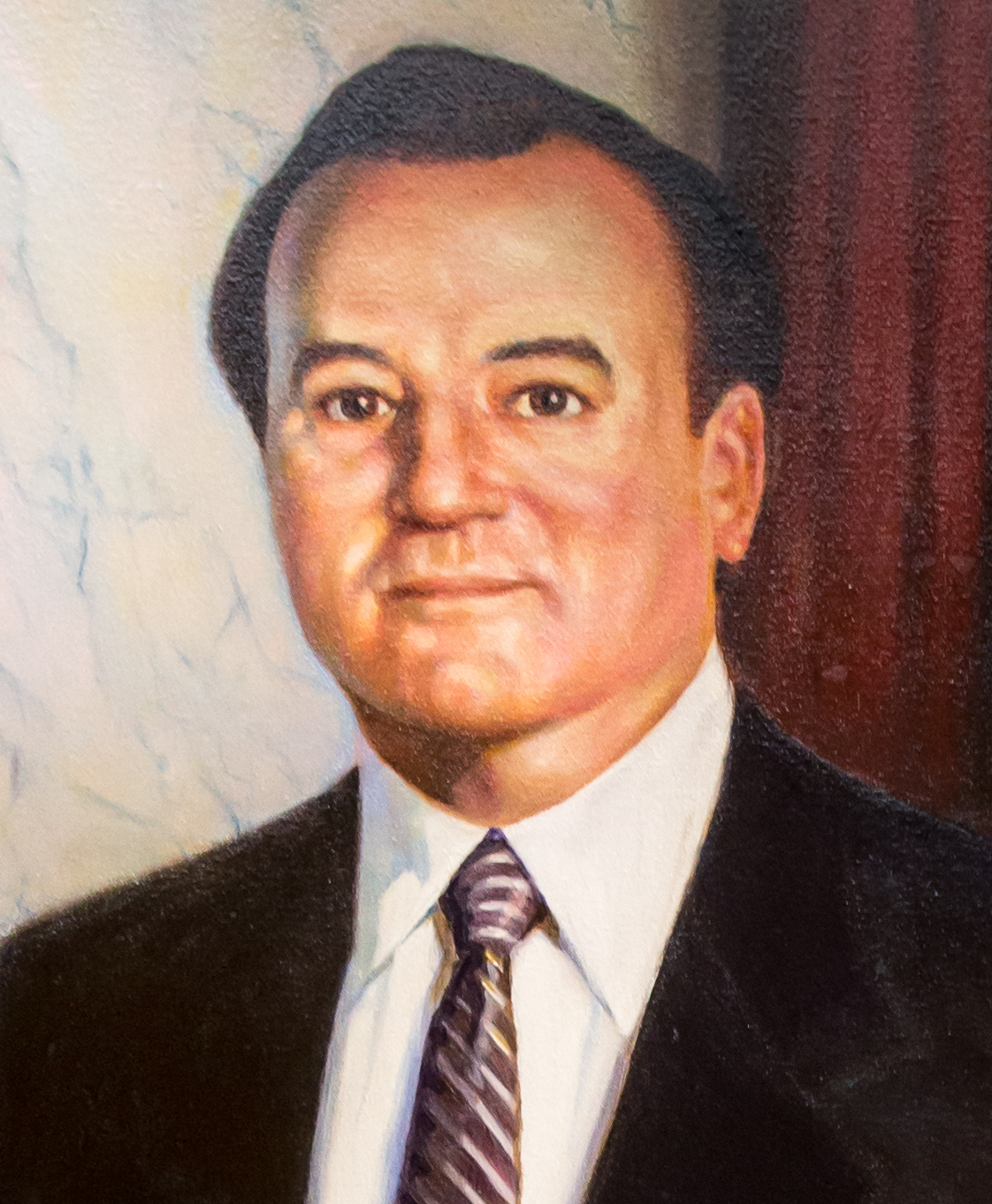

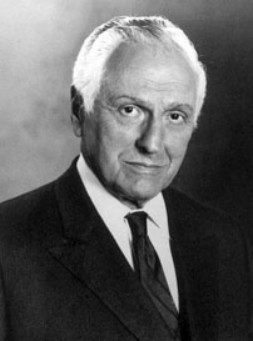
Nominee	Edward D. DiPrete	Bruce Sundlun
Party	Republican	Democratic
Popular vote	208,822	104,504
Percentage	64.7%	32.4%
- DiPrete: 50–60% 60–70% 70–80% 80–90%
Governor before election
Edward D. DiPrete
Republican
Elected Governor
Edward D. DiPrete
Republican

The 1986 Rhode Island gubernatorial election was held on November 4, 1986. Incumbent Republican Edward D. DiPrete defeated Democratic nominee Bruce Sundlun with 64.70% of the vote.

== South Carolina ==
1986 South Carolina gubernatorial election
- November 4, 1986
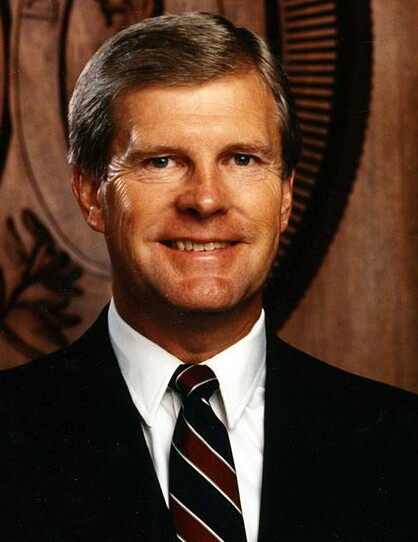

Nominee	Carroll Campbell	Michael R. Daniel
Party	Republican	Democratic
Popular vote	384,565	361,328
Percentage	51.0%	47.9%
- County results Campbell: 50–60% 60–70% 70–80% Daniel: 40–50% 50–60% 60–70%
Governor before election
Richard Riley
Democratic
Elected Governor
Carroll A. Campbell Jr.
Republican

The 1986 South Carolina gubernatorial election was held on November 4, 1986, to select the governor of the state of South Carolina. Carroll A. Campbell Jr., a Republican representative of the 4th congressional district, narrowly defeated Democrat Michael R. Daniel to become the 112th governor of South Carolina and only the second Republican governor since Reconstruction.

== South Dakota ==
1986 South Dakota gubernatorial election
- November 4, 1986
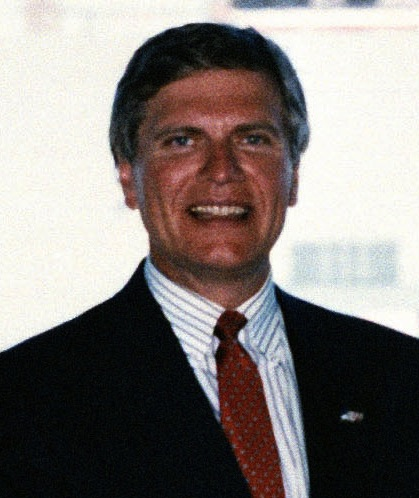

Nominee	George Mickelson	Lars Herseth
Party	Republican	Democratic
Running mate	Walter D. Miller	Ted Thoms
Popular vote	152,543	141,898
Percentage	51.8%	48.2%
- County results Mickelson: 50–60% 60–70% Herseth: 50–60% 60–70% 70–80%
Governor before election
Bill Janklow
Republican
Elected Governor
George Mickelson
Republican

The 1986 South Dakota gubernatorial election was held on November 4, 1986 to elect the Governor of South Dakota. Incumbent Bill Janklow was term-limited, so the field for the new governor was open. Republican nominee George S. Mickelson was elected, defeating Democratic nominee Ralph Lars Herseth.

== Tennessee ==
1986 Tennessee gubernatorial election
- November 4, 1986
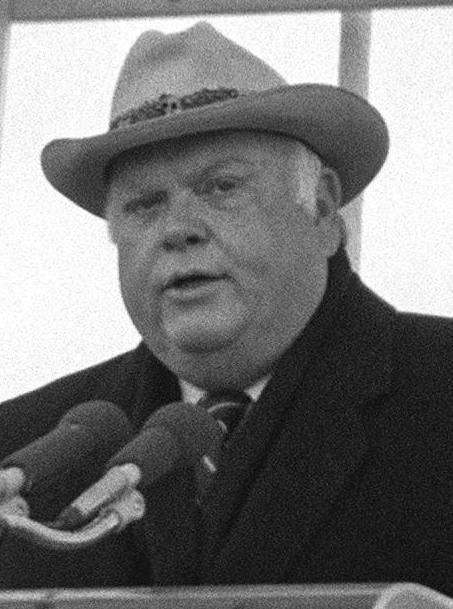

Nominee	Ned McWherter	Winfield Dunn
Party	Democratic	Republican
Popular vote	656,602	553,449
Percentage	54.26%	45.74%
- County results McWherter: 50–60% 60–70% 70–80% 80–90% Dunn: 50–60% 60–70%
Governor before election
Lamar Alexander
Republican
Elected Governor
Ned McWherter
Democratic

The 1986 Tennessee gubernatorial election was held on November 4, 1986, to elect the next governor of Tennessee. Democratic nominee Ned McWherter defeated former Republican governor Winfield Dunn with 54.3% of the vote.

== Texas ==
1986 Texas gubernatorial election
- November 4, 1986
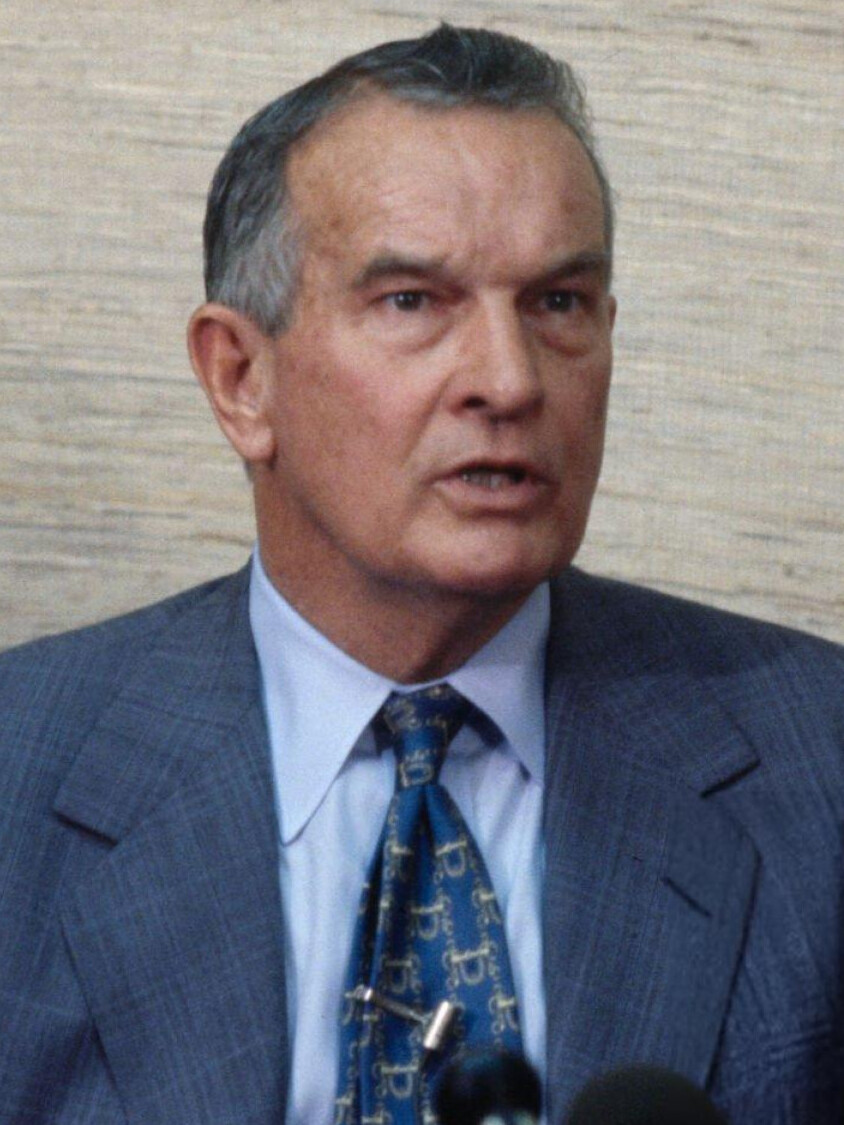

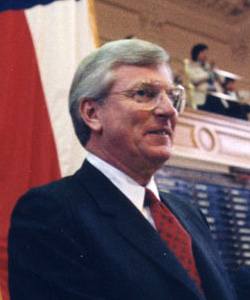
Nominee	Bill Clements	Mark White
Party	Republican	Democratic
Popular vote	1,813,779	1,584,515
Percentage	52.7%	46.0%
- County results Clements: 40–50% 50–60% 60–70% 70–80% 80–90% White: 40–50% 50–60% 60–70% 70–80%
Governor before election
Mark White
Democratic
Elected Governor
Bill Clements
Republican

The 1986 Texas gubernatorial election was held on November 4, 1986, to elect the governor of Texas. The election was a rematch of the 1982 election, as incumbent Democratic governor Mark White ran for reelection against former Republican governor Bill Clements. Clements was elected to a second, non-consecutive term as governor, winning 53% of the vote to White's 46%.

== Vermont ==
1986 Vermont gubernatorial election
- November 4, 1986
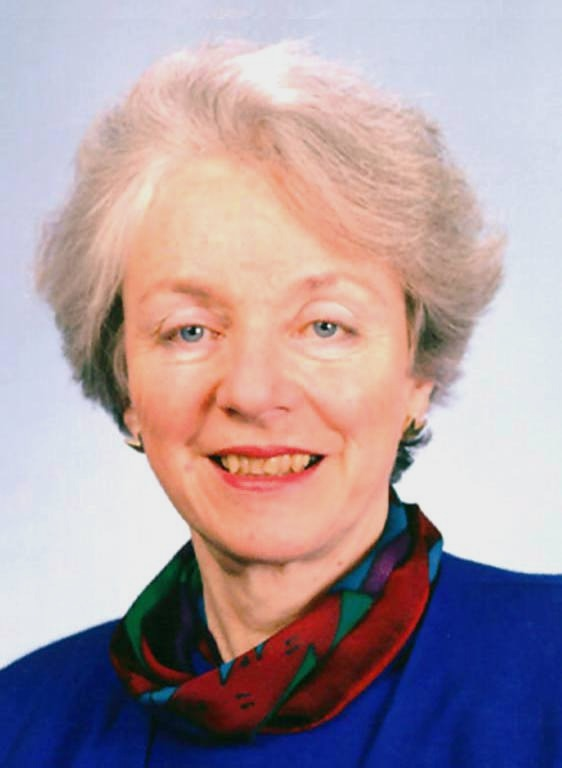

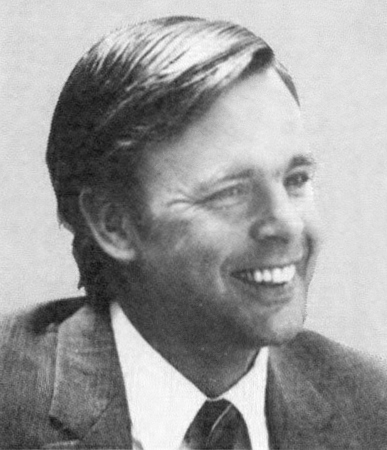

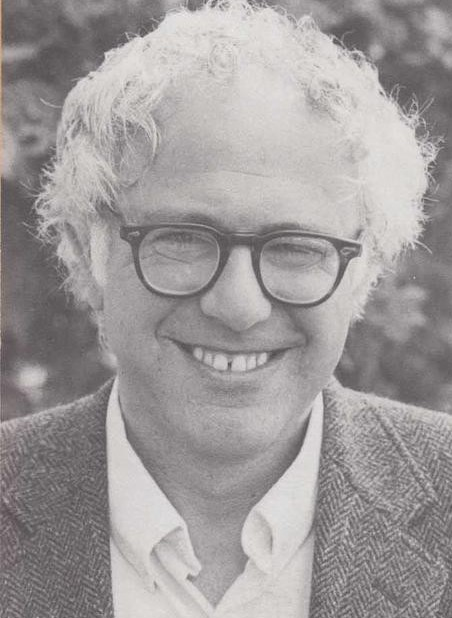
Nominee	Madeleine Kunin	Peter Smith	Bernie Sanders
Party	Democratic	Republican	Independent
Electoral vote	139	39	2
Popular vote	92,485	75,239	28,418
Percentage	47.0%	38.2%	14.4%
- Kunin: 30-40% 40-50% 50-60% 60-70% Smith: 30-40% 40-50% 50-60% 60-70%
Governor before election
Madeleine Kunin
Democratic
Elected Governor
Madeleine Kunin
Democratic

The 1986 Vermont gubernatorial election took place on November 4, 1986. Incumbent Democrat Madeleine Kunin ran successfully for re-election to a second term as Governor of Vermont, defeating Republican candidate Peter Plympton Smith and independent candidate Bernie Sanders. Since no candidate won a majority of the popular vote, Kunin was elected by the Vermont General Assembly per the state constitution.

== Wisconsin ==
1986 Wisconsin gubernatorial election
- November 4, 1986
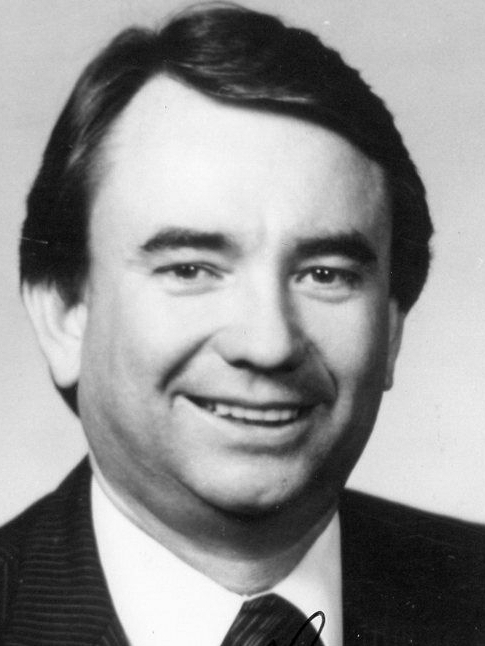

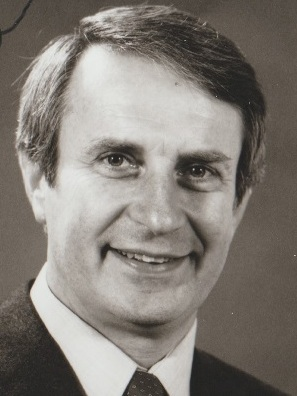
Nominee	Tommy G. Thompson	Anthony S. Earl
Party	Republican	Democratic
Running mate	Scott McCallum	Sharon K. Metz
Popular vote	805,090	705,578
Percentage	52.73%	46.21%
- County results Thompson: 40–50% 50–60% 60–70% 70–80% Earl: 50–60% 60–70%
Governor before election
Anthony S. Earl
Democratic
Elected Governor
Tommy G. Thompson
Republican

The 1986 Wisconsin gubernatorial election was held on November 4, 1986. Republican Tommy G. Thompson won the election with 53% of the vote, winning his first term as Governor of Wisconsin and defeating incumbent Governor Anthony S. Earl. This was the first time since 1962 that the winner of a Wisconsin gubernatorial election was of the same party as the incumbent president. Jonathan B. Barry unsuccessfully sought the Republican nomination.

== Wyoming ==
1986 Wyoming gubernatorial election
- November 4, 1986
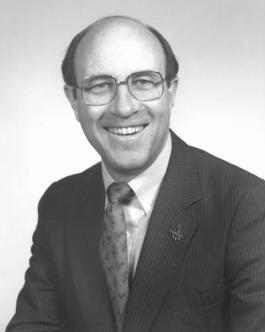

Nominee	Mike Sullivan	Pete Simpson
Party	Democratic	Republican
Popular vote	88,879	75,841
Percentage	53.96%	46.04%
- County results Sullivan: 50–60% 60–70% Simpson: 50–60%
Governor before election
Edgar Herschler
Democratic
Elected Governor
Mike Sullivan
Democratic

The 1986 Wyoming gubernatorial election took place on November 4, 1986. Popular three-term Democratic Governor Edgar Herschler announced that he would not seek a fourth term, creating an open seat. Attorney Mike Sullivan emerged as the unlikely Democratic nominee, and faced former state representative Pete Simpson, the Republican nominee and the brother of then-U.S. senator Alan K. Simpson, in the general election. Despite Sullivan's political inexperience, he was able to defeat Simpson by a decisive margin, winning his first of two terms in office.

== Territories and federal district ==
=== District of Columbia ===
1986 United States gubernatorial elections
- November 6, 1986
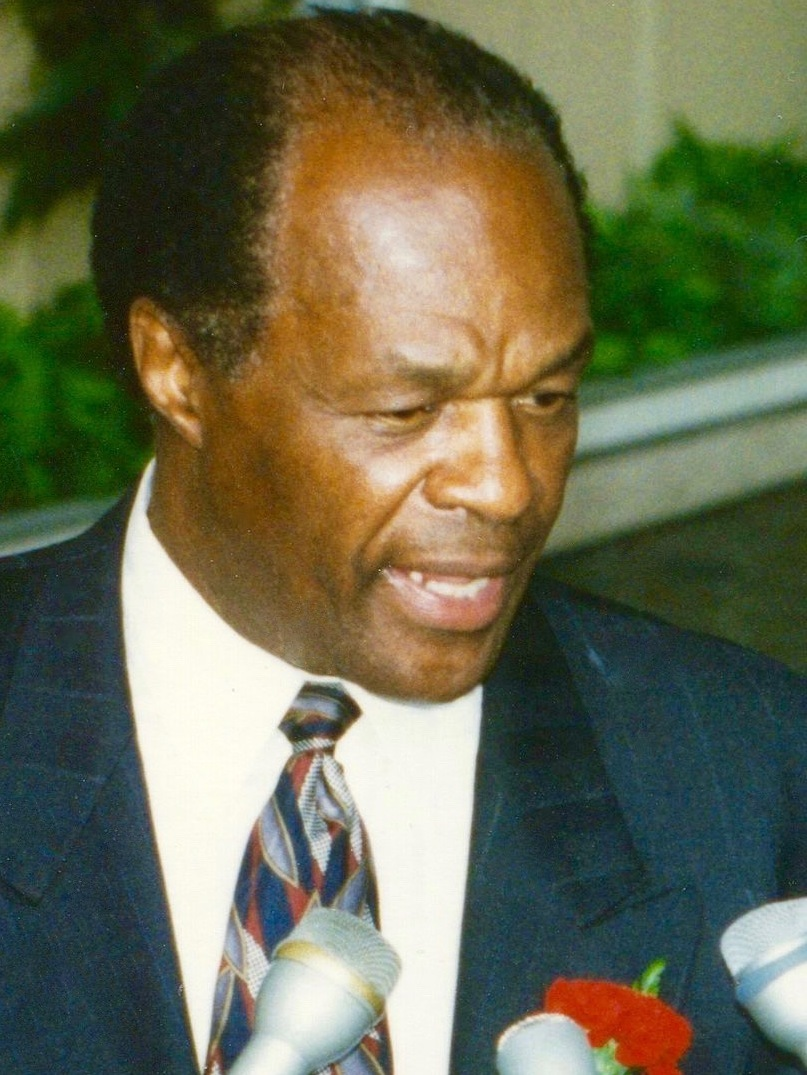

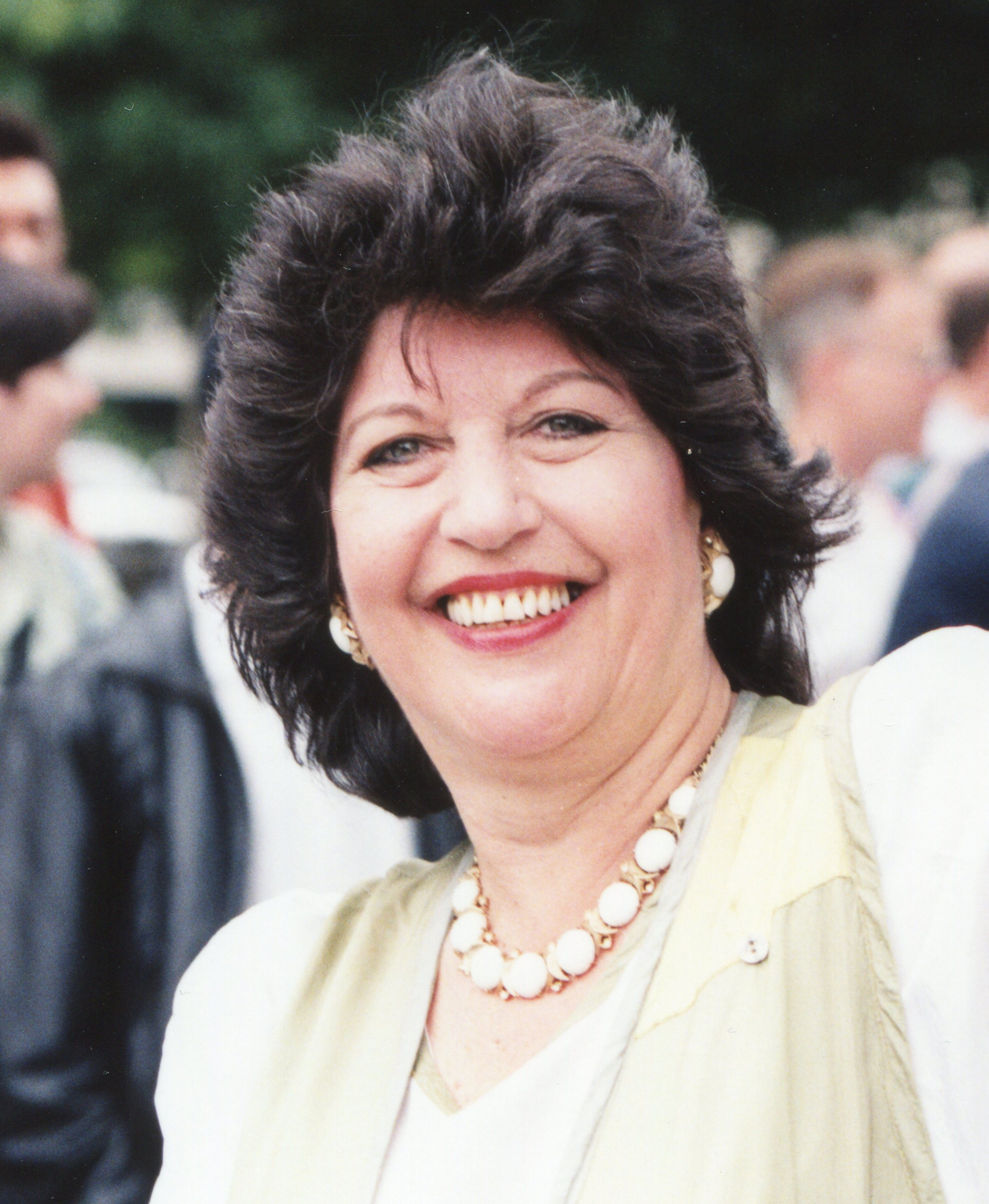
Nominee	Marion Barry	Carol Schwartz
Party	Democratic	Republican
Popular vote	79,142	42,354
Percentage	61.4%	32.9%
- Results by ward Barry: 60–70% 80–90% Schwartz: 50–60% 80–90%
Mayor before election
Marion Barry
Democratic
Elected mayor
Marion Barry
Democratic

On November 6, 1986, Washington, D.C., held an election for its mayor, with Democratic candidate and incumbent mayor Marion Barry defeating Republican candidate Carol Schwartz.

=== Guam ===
Guam election
Party	Candidate	Votes	%
Republican	Joseph Franklin Ada	{{{votes}}}	53.8%
Democratic	Ricardo Bordallo	{{{votes}}}	46.2%
Total votes		{{{votes}}}	100.00
Republican hold			

=== U.S. Virgin Islands ===
U.S. Virgin Islands election
Party	Candidate	Votes	%
Democratic	Alexander Farrelly	{{{votes}}}	65.4%
Independent	Adelbert Bryan	{{{votes}}}	34.6%
Total votes		{{{votes}}}	100.00
Democratic hold			

== See also ==
- 1986 United States elections
  - 1986 United States Senate elections
  - 1986 United States House of Representatives elections
