= Dennis W. Schulstad =

United States Air Force general

- Born: December 11, 1944 (age 81)
- Citizenship: United States of America
- Education: University of Minnesota / Harvard University
- Occupation: retired
- Political party: Republican
- Spouse(s): Pamela D. Schulstad (deceased, 2021)

Dennis (Denny) W. Schulstad (born December 11, 1944) is a retired Air Force Brigadier General and a former representative on the Minneapolis City Council.

In retirement he is a member of several non-profit boards and commissions.

== Education ==
1966' University of Minnesota

Bachelor of Art in Public Speech / Public Relations

1989' Harvard University

Program for Senior Executives of Government

== Career ==
=== Brigadier General at United States Air Force (1966–2000) ===
Schulstad served 35 years active duty and in the Air Force Reserve. Assignments included the Air Force Academy, March AFB, Keesler AFB and Langley AFB. Roles included Public Affairs, Strategic Planning and work at Headquarters TAC and Air Combat Command. He commanded a Student Squadron with 850 members and commanded the 43-member Air Force Academy Liaison Officer program in Minnesota.

=== Minneapolis City Council (1976–1998) ===
Schulstad represented the 12th Ward for 22 years.

== Military education background ==
1978 Squadron Officer School

1981 Air Command and Staff College

1984 Air War College

== Military assignments ==
- October 1966 – June 1967, administrative officer, 3408th Student Squadron, Keesler AFB
- July 1967 – June 1968, Commander, 3408th Student Squadron, Keesler AFB
- June 1968 – March 1970, recruiting officer, Minneapolis, Minn.
- March 1970 – December 1970, personnel officer, 934th Tactical Air Group, Minneapolis, Minn.
- December 1970 – December 1971, quality control officer, 934th Tactical Air Group, Minneapolis, Minn.
- December 1971 – November 1978, U.S. Air Force Academy liaison officer, Colorado Springs, Colo.
- November 1978 – January 1984, admissions liaison officer, U.S. Air Force Academy and Air Force ROTC, Lowry AFB
- January 1984 – November 1984, Commander, Admissions Liaison Office, Minnesota Region, Minneapolis
- November 1984 – August 1991, individual mobilization augmentee to the Director of Public Affairs, Headquarters 15th Air Force, March AFB
- September 1991 – July 1992, individual mobilization augmentee to the Director of Public Affairs, Headquarters Tactical Air Command, Langley AFB
- July 1992 – March 1994, individual mobilization augmentee to the Director of Public Affairs, Headquarters Air Combat Command, Langley AFB
- March 1994 – April 2000, mobilization assistant to the director of plans and programs, Headquarters ACC, Langley AFB

== Political background ==
Schulstad was the Republican candidate for Lieutenant Governor with Cal Ludeman during the 1986 Minnesota Gubernatorial race. The pair won the Republican primary election and lost the general election to Governor Rudy Perpich. He was the elected member of the Minneapolis City Council for nine terms from 1976 until he retired in 1998. He won each election with 65% or more of the vote. He was the only Republican endorsed office holder in Minneapolis and after he retired, no Republican has been elected in that city.

== Major awards & achievements ==
- Employer Support of the Guard and Reserve (ESGR) Lifetime Achievement Award (2021)
- University of Minnesota Alumni of Notable Achievement
- Air Force Academy Lifetime Achievement Award
- State of Minnesota Distinguished Service Medal
- University of Minnesota Alumni Service Award
- Secretary of Defense Medal for Outstanding Public Service
- Air Force Distinguished Public Service Award
- Inaugural Hall of Fame, Roosevelt High School
- Air Force Commendation Medal with two oak leaf clusters
- Air Force Outstanding Unit Award with oak leaf cluster
- National Defense Service Medal
- Armed Forces Reserve Medal with hourglass
- Outstanding admissions liaison officer commander
- Outstanding additional duty admissions liaison officer in the nation
- Air Force Recruiting Special Achievement Award

== Professional memberships ==
- Commodore and President, Minneapolis Aquatennial Association
- Promotions and arrangements task force, Super Bowl XXVI
- National vice chairman, the President's Dinner, 1980
- National President, 63,000 member University of Minnesota Alumni Association, 2007-2008
- Minnesota State Chairman, Employer Support of the Guard and Reserve (ESGR)
- Co-founder and President, Minnesotans Military Appreciation Fund

== Dates of military promotion ==
Military Position	Date of Promotion
Brigadier General	April 3, 1995
Colonel	August 1, 1991
Lieutenant Colonel	July 27, 1987
Major	July 27, 1980
Captain	October 30, 1969
First Lieutenant	April 30, 1968
Second Lieutenant	July 27, 1966

Party political offices
Preceded by Lauris Krenik	Republican nominee for Lieutenant Governor of Minnesota; 1986	Succeeded by Joanell Dyrstad
