= 1986 Minnesota gubernatorial election =

- November 4, 1986
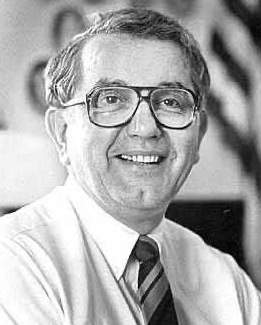

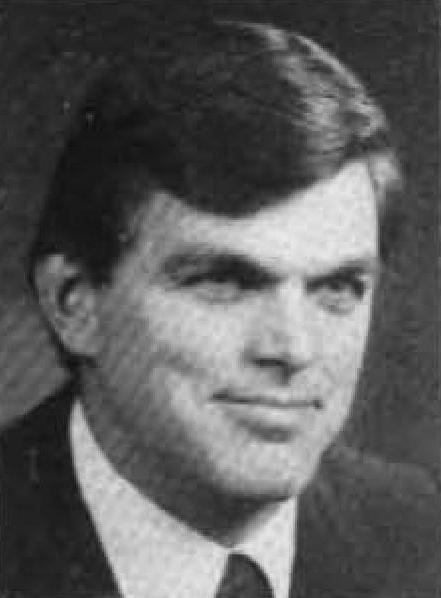
Nominee	Rudy Perpich	Cal Ludeman
Party	Democratic (DFL)	Ind.-Republican
Running mate	Marlene Johnson	Dennis W. Schulstad
Popular vote	790,138	606,755
Percentage	56.11%	43.09%
- County results Perpich: 40–50% 50–60% 60–70% 70–80% 80–90% Ludeman: 40–50% 50–60% 60–70%
Governor before election
Rudy Perpich
Democratic (DFL)
Elected Governor
Rudy Perpich
Democratic (DFL)

The 1986 Minnesota gubernatorial election took place on November 4, 1986. Minnesota Democratic–Farmer–Labor Party candidate Rudy Perpich defeated Independent-Republican Party challenger Cal Ludeman. Saint Paul Mayor George Latimer unsuccessfully ran for the Democratic nomination.

This would be the last gubernatorial election won by a Democrat until 2010.

== DFL primary ==
=== Candidates ===
- William T. Heine, St. Paul resident and perennial candidate
  - Running mate: Dale Johnson, St. Paul resident
- George Latimer, mayor of Saint Paul since 1976
  - Running mate: Arvonne Fraser, co-founder of the Women's Equity Action League and wife of Minneapolis mayor Don Fraser
- Andrew L. Olson, Heron Lake farmer and supporter of Lyndon LaRouche
  - Running mate: Linda Herschbach, Mendota Heights resident
- Rudy Perpich, incumbent governor since 1983
  - Running mate: Marlene Johnson, incumbent lieutenant governor since 1983
- Phil Ratté, Columbia Heights resident and perennial candidate
  - Running mate: Kim Kimmel, Magnolia resident

=== Results ===
1986 DFL gubernatorial primary
Party	Candidate	Votes	%
Democratic (DFL)	Rudy Perpich (incumbent)	293,426	57.48%
Democratic (DFL)	George Latimer	207,198	40.59%
Democratic (DFL)	Andrew L. Olson	4,448	0.87%
Democratic (DFL)	William T. Heine	3,204	0.63%
Democratic (DFL)	Phil Ratté	2,219	0.43%
Total votes		510,495	100.00%

== Independent-Republican primary ==
=== Candidates ===
- Wallace Brattrud, retired Waseca businessman and Democratic candidate for U.S. representative in 1982 and 1984
  - Running mate: Lavinia Olson, Minneapolis resident
- James Lindau, mayor of Bloomington since 1977
  - Running mate: M. Joan Parent, retired veterinarian from Foley
- Cal Ludeman, farmer and former state representative from Tracy
  - Running mate: Denny Schulstad, member of the Minneapolis City Council and retired U.S. Air Force brigadier general
- Beatrice Mooney, Lake St. Croix Beach registered nurse
  - Running mate: Ione Gerads, Cottage Grove resident
- Doug Williams, Chaska resident
  - Running mate: Steve Williams, Shakopee resident

The Mooney-Gerads ticket was the first all-woman gubernatorial ticket to run for a major party nomination in Minnesota history.

=== Results ===
1986 DFL gubernatorial primary
Party	Candidate	Votes	%
Ind.-Republican	Cal Ludeman	147,674	76.85%
Ind.-Republican	James Lindau	30,768	16.01%
Ind.-Republican	Douglas J. Williams	5,431	2.83%
Ind.-Republican	Wallace C. Brattrud	4,598	2.39%
Ind.-Republican	Beatrice Mooney	3,682	1.92%
Total votes		192,153	100.00%

== General election ==
=== Candidates ===
- W. Z. "Bill" Brust, former Trotskyist university professor from West St. Paul (Workers League)
  - Running mate: Cory Johnson, Minneapolis resident
- Tom Jaax, St. Paul knitting machine operator (Socialist Workers)
  - Running mate: August Nimtz, Minneapolis university professor
- Cal Ludeman, farmer and former state representative from Tracy (Independent-Republican)
  - Running mate: Denny Schulstad, member of the Minneapolis City Council
- Rudy Perpich, incumbent governor since 1983 (DFL)
  - Running mate: Marlene Johnson, incumbent lieutenant governor since 1983
- Joseph A. Rohner III, Wayzata resident (Libertarian)
  - Running mate: Edwin Mudge, Minneapolis resident
- Mark Rosen, Twin Cities WCCO sportscaster (write-in)

=== Results ===
1986 Minnesota gubernatorial election
Party	Candidate	Votes	%	±%
Democratic (DFL)	Rudy Perpich (incumbent)	790,138	56.11%	−2.64%
Ind.-Republican	Cal Ludeman	606,755	43.09%	+3.23%
Workers League	W. Z. Brust	4,208	0.30%	n/a
Libertarian	Joseph A. Rohner III	3,852	0.27%	−0.08%
Socialist Workers	Tom Jaax	3,151	0.22%	n/a
Majority		183,383	13.02%	
Turnout		1,408,104		
Democratic (DFL) hold		Swing		
