= Cal Ludeman =

American politician (born 1951)

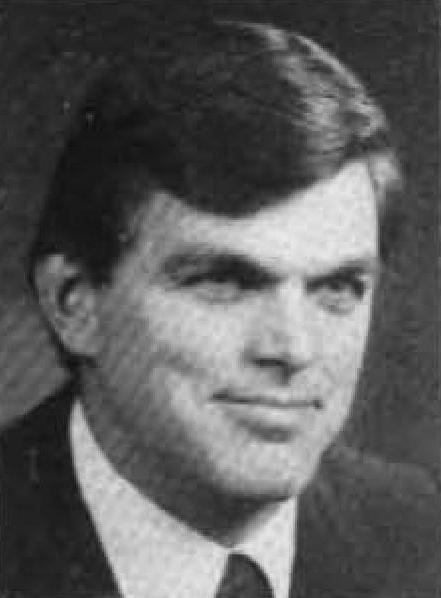
- Ludeman as a state representative

Secretary of the Minnesota Senate
- Incumbent
- Assumed office January 3, 2017
- President: Michelle Fischbach; Jeremy Miller; David Tomassoni; Jeremy Miller; David Osmek
- Preceded by: JoAnne Zoff
- In office January 4, 2011 – January 7, 2013
- President: Michelle Fischbach
- Preceded by: JoAnne Zoff
- Succeeded by: JoAnne Zoff

Commissioner of the Minnesota Department of Health
- In office July 2006 – January 2011
- Governor: Tim Pawlenty

Commissioner of the Minnesota Department of Employee Relations
- In office January 2003 – July 2006
- Governor: Tim Pawlenty

Member of the Minnesota House of Representatives from the 27A district 20B (1979–1983)
- In office January 3, 1979 – January 7, 1985
- Preceded by: Russell Stanton
- Succeeded by: Jim Boerboom

Personal details
- Born: April 1951 (age 75)
- Party: Republican
- Spouse: Deb
- Children: 3
- Education: South Dakota State University; University of Wyoming

Cal R. Ludeman (/ˈluːdəmən/ LOO-də-mən; born April 1951) is an American politician who most recently served as Secretary of the Minnesota Senate. He is a former member of the Minnesota House of Representatives from southwestern Minnesota. First elected in 1978, he was re-elected in 1980 and 1982. He represented the old District 20B and, after redistricting in 1980, District 27A, which included all or portions of Lincoln and Lyon counties.

== State representative ==
From the town of Tracy, Ludeman, a farmer, was active on issues relevant to agriculture, the environment and labor-management relations while in the legislature. He served on the House Agriculture, Environment & Natural Resources, Government Operation, Labor-Management Relations, and Transportation committees, and on various sub-committees relevant to each area. He was minority whip during the 1983-84 legislative session.

== Gubernatorial and congressional runs ==
After opting not to run again for his legislative seat in 1984, Ludeman turned his eyes toward the governor’s chair, running as the Republican-endorsed candidate for Governor of Minnesota in 1986, but he failed to unseat popular incumbent Governor Rudy Perpich. In 1992, he ran for the congressional seat being vacated by Vin Weber. After a close, hard-fought race, he lost to David Minge.

== Service as state commissioner ==
Governor Arne Carlson appointed Ludeman to serve on his Commission on Reform and Efficiency (CORE) in 1991, a position he held until 1994. In 2003, newly elected Governor Tim Pawlenty tapped Ludeman to be his commissioner for the Minnesota Department of Employee Relations. He remained in that position until July 2006, when Pawlenty appointed him acting commissioner of the Minnesota Department of Human Services—a position later made permanent in December of that year.

As Minnesota’s Commissioner of Human Services, Ludeman also served as chair of the governor's Health Cabinet, which is charged with using the state’s health care purchasing influence to buy better health care, to streamline and improve health care regulation, and to drive the market to obtain better health care-related results for Minnesotans. He co-chaired the governor’s Health Transformation Task Force, which resulted in significant health care reform in 2008.

== Service as Secretary of the Senate ==
After Governor Pawlenty left office in January 2011, Ludemann was selected to serve as Secretary of the Minnesota Senate by the incoming Republican majority.

Ludeman's involvement in the termination of a former employee of the Minnesota Senate, Michael Brodkorb, came under scrutiny due to a lawsuit by Brodkorb. Ludeman was listed in initial paperwork regarding Brodkorb's lawsuit over his termination from the Minnesota Senate. Lawyers representing Brodkorb announced additional claims against the State of Minnesota, the Minnesota Senate and Ludeman over allegations that Ludeman disclosed private unemployment data about Brodkorb in an interview with Minnesota Public Radio. Brodkorb's attorneys also sued for defamation per se over statements Ludeman made in a press release where he accused Brodkorb of attempting to "extort payment from the Senate."

On May 25, 2012, the Minnesota Senate released legal bills showing they had spent $46,150 in the first 3 months of 2012 to prepare a defense to Brodkorb's suit. An analysis of the bill, conducted by the Associated Press, showed the bulk of the $46,150 owed was due to attorneys retained by the Minnesota Senate repeatedly meeting with Ludeman.

On June 19, 2012, the Minnesota Senate announced additional legal bills in the amount of $38,533, bringing the total legal costs incurred by the Minnesota Senate due to the termination of Brodkorb to almost $85,000 since the end of the May 2012. In 2013, the Senate settled the lawsuit, paying Brodkorb $30,000, which was far less than the $500,000 Brodkorb had sought.

Ludeman was again selected to be secretary of the Senate following the Republicans regaining a majority in the 2016 election.

Minnesota House of Representatives
Preceded by Russell P. Stanton	Member of the Minnesota House of Representatives from the 20B district 1979–1983	Succeeded by Ray Welker
Preceded by George Mann	Member of the Minnesota House of Representatives from the 27A district 1983–1985	Succeeded by Jim Boerboom
Party political offices
Preceded by Wheelock Whitney Jr.	Republican nominee for Governor of Minnesota; 1986	Succeeded by Jon Grunseth
Preceded by Wheelock Whitney Jr.	Endorsed Gubernatorial Candidate, Minnesota Republican Party State Convention; 1986	Succeeded by Jon Grunseth
Political offices
Preceded by JoAnne Zoff and Peter Wattson	Secretary of the Minnesota Senate; 2011–2013	Succeeded by JoAnne Zoff
Preceded by JoAnne Zoff	Secretary of the Minnesota Senate; 2017–present	Incumbent
