= Westport Community Church =

Historic church in Maine, United States

- U.S. National Register of Historic Places
- Location within Maine Location within the United States
- Location: Main Rd., ME 144, Westport, Maine
- Coordinates: 43°53′57″N 69°42′34″W
- Area: 0.3 acres (0.12 ha)
- Built: 1835
- Architectural style: Greek Revival
- NRHP reference No.: 02000784
- Added to NRHP: July 15, 2002

The Westport Community Church, also known historically as Temperance Hall and the Music Hall, is a historic church on Main Road (Maine State Route 144) in Westport, Maine. Probably built in the 1830s, and moved to its present location in 1864, it is a fine local example of Greek Revival architecture. It is now owned by a local non-profit organization, used for events and functions in the summertime. It was listed on the National Register of Historic Places in 2002.

== Description and history ==
The Westport Community Church stands on the west side of Main Road, near the geographic center of Westport Island. It is located just north of Westport Town Hall and south of the Squire Tarbox House. It is a modest 1-1/2 story wood frame structure, with a gabled roof, clapboarded exterior, and granite foundation. Its front facade is three bays wide, with a pair of entrances flanking a sash window, beneath an entablature and fully pedimented gable. The entrances are topped by transom windows and corniced entablatures, and the main gable has a sash window at its center, with a triangular louver at the peak of the gable. Windows on the front and sides are topped by shallow projecting lintels. The entrances lead into separate vestibules, which open into an anteroom leading to the main space, which occupies most of the building. It has rows of grain-painted bench pews, and is lit by a chandelier and wall sconces fueled by oil.

The exact circumstances of the building's construction and early use are not known. It originally stood in a small settlement at McCarty's Cove, and was probably built by James McCarty, a prominent ship's captain. Its construction date is ascribed to the 1830s, based on architectural and stylistic evidence. Early deeds refer to it as a "music hall"; it was moved to its present site in 1864 and sold to a Methodist congregation. That congregation held services here until 1950. It has been owned and maintained by a local community group since. It is among Westport's best examples of Greek Revival architecture, many others having been destroyed in a major fire in 1918.

== See also ==
- National Register of Historic Places listings in Lincoln County, Maine
