= Westport Town Hall =

Historic church in Maine, United States

- Union Meeting House, (Former)
- U.S. National Register of Historic Places
- Location within Maine Location within the United States
- Location: Main Rd. (ME 144), Westport, Maine
- Coordinates: 43°53′55″N 69°42′34″W
- Area: less than one acre
- Built: 1794
- Architect: Davis, Moses
- Architectural style: Federal
- NRHP reference No.: 02000786
- Added to NRHP: July 15, 2002

Westport Town Hall is the current town hall of Westport, Maine. It is located on Main Road (Maine State Route 144) in a former Congregational church built in 1794. The building, used as the town hall since 1885, was listed on the National Register of Historic Places in 2002 as Union Meeting House, (Former) [sic].

== Description and history ==
Westport Town Hall stands on the west side of SR 144, in the dispersed rural village center of Westport. It is located south of the Westport Community Church and the Squire Tarbox House. It is a single-story wood frame structure, with a gabled roof, clapboarded exterior, and granite foundation. Its street-facing front facade is symmetrical, with a central double door flanked by sash windows, with three sash windows at the balcony level, and a single sash window near the peak of the gable. All windows save the last, and the doorway, are topped by semi-circular fans, a detail that is continued to windows on the building sides. The interior has a small vestibule, with kitchen facilities and stairs leading to the balcony, with the main meeting space occupying the remainder of the building. A raised stage is located at the far end, one end partly closed off the provide additional office space. Due to extensive alterations, only a small number of interior features remain from the period of construction, including balcony panels and railings.

The church was built in the early 1790s as a parish church for the Jeremysquam district of Edgecomb, which was later separated as Westport. It was used principally by Free Will Baptists, and in 1828, when Westport was incorporated, it also served as town hall for a few years. Town meetings were then held in a district school, and the Free Will Baptists shared the building for a time with a Methodist congregation. The Baptists apparently disbanded in 1864, and the Methodist moved to the Westport Community Church, leaving the building vacant until 1885, when it was acquired by the town. In addition to its municipal functions, the building has served as a social venue and hosted the local Grange organization. The building is one of a small number of surviving Federal period church buildings in the state.

== See also ==
- National Register of Historic Places listings in Lincoln County, Maine
