= Back River =

Back River may refer to various watercourses:

== Australia ==
- Back River (Tamworth), a tributary of the Barnard River in New South Wales
- Back River (Cooma-Monaro), a tributary of the Tuross River in New South Wales
- Back River (Victoria), a tributary of the Timbarra River in Victoria

== Canada ==
- Back River (Nunavut)
- Rivière des Prairies in Quebec, also known in English as Back River
- Atlatzi River, British Columbia, formerly known as the Back River

== Jamaica ==
- Back River (Jamaica)

== United States ==
- Back River (Kennebec River), a river in coastal Maine, in the combined estuary of the Sheepscot and the Kennebec rivers
- Back River (Sheepscot River), a short tidal channel in the town of Boothbay, Maine
- Back River (Meduncook River), a short tributary of the Meduncook River in Friendship, Maine
- Back River (Medomak River), river in Friendship, Maine, which empties into the estuary of the Medomak River
- Back River (Saint George River), a tributary of the Saint George River in Knox County, Maine
- Back River (Maryland), a tidal estuary in Baltimore County, Maryland
- Back River (Powwow River), a tributary of the Powwow River in New Hampshire and Massachusetts
- Back River (Buzzards Bay), a small tidal estuary in Bourne, Massachusetts
- Back River (Massachusetts Bay), which flows into Duxbury Bay
- Back River (Merrimac, Massachusetts), a much smaller tributary of the Powwow River
- Weymouth Back River, in Weymouth, Massachusetts
- Back River (Berkeley County, South Carolina), a small tributary of the Cooper River (South Carolina)
- Back River (Virginia), an estuarine inlet of the Chesapeake Bay between Hampton and Poquoson, Virginia
- Back River (Savannah River), a secondary channel of the Savannah River, southeastern US
