= Maine Yankee Nuclear Power Plant =

Nuclear power plant shut in 1996

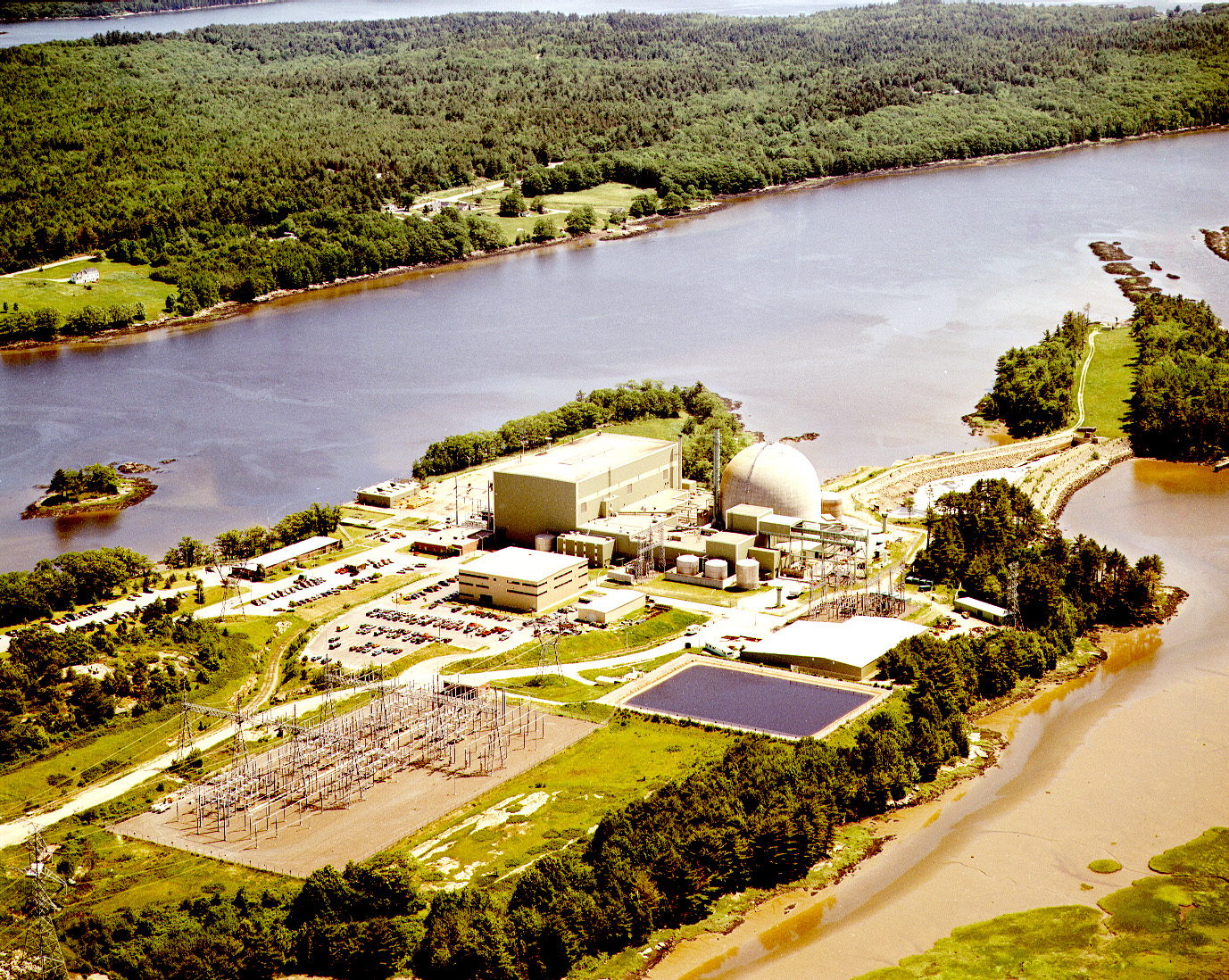
- Maine Yankee nuclear power plant
- Country: United States
- Location: Wiscasset, Lincoln County, Maine
- Coordinates: 43°57′2″N 69°41′45″W
- Status: Decommissioned
- Construction began: October 1, 1968
- Commission date: December 28, 1972
- Decommission date: August 1, 1997
- Construction cost: $231 million (1972 USD)
- Operator: Maine Yankee Atomic Power Company

Nuclear power station
- Reactor type: PWR
- Reactor supplier: Combustion Engineering; Asea Brown Boveri
- Cooling source: Back River
- Thermal capacity: 1 × 2630 MW_{th} (decommissioned)

Power generation
- Make and model: CE/ABB 3-loop design
- Units decommissioned: 1 × 860 MW
- Capacity factor: 68.2% (lifetime)

External links
- Website: Maine Yankee
- Commons: Related media on Commons

Maine Yankee Nuclear Power Plant was a nuclear power plant built at an 820-acre site on Bailey Peninsula of Wiscasset, Maine, in the United States. It operated from 1972 until 1996, when problems at the plant became too expensive to fix. It was decommissioned and dismantled between 1997 and 2005, though some of the plant's nuclear waste is still stored on site, pending final disposal.

== History ==
The Maine Yankee Atomic Power Company formed in 1966 with plans for a pressurized water reactor in Wiscasset, Maine, and a 40-year operating license.

Maine Yankee was the subject of heated political debate around Maine's 1986 gubernatorial election. Democrat James E. Tierney and independent Sherry Huber called to close the plant by 1988, while Republican John R. McKernan Jr. and another independent, John Menario, wanted to keep it open. McKernan ultimately won the election.

Construction of the $231 million ($2,100,000,000 today) plant ran from 1968 to 1972, whereupon the plant became Maine's sole operating nuclear power plant. From then until 1996, the 900 megawatt reactor produced about 119 terawatt-hours of electricity, most of the state's energy. In Maine Yankee's most productive year, 1989, it produced 6,900 gigawatt-hours of electricity.

== Opposition ==
Initial opposition for constructing the plant was led by Citizens for Safe Power, the Audubon Naturalist Council, the Natural Resources Council of Maine, and Maine’s Governor Kenneth M. Curtis, in the form of a petition to the Atomic Energy Commission, asking for the suspension of the plants operating license due to the concern with environmental and safety issues. The group failed to stop construction but succeeded in persuading the Nuclear Regulatory Commission to impose stricter environmental standards and monitoring. After the malfunction of the Three Mile Island power plant in Pennsylvania, citizens Raymond and Patricia Shadis of Wiscasset led 1,000 people in a march to the Maine capitol to propose a statewide anti-nuclear petition. The initiative to eliminate nuclear power in Maine was voted on several times between 1982 and 1987, but never passed. Finally in 1987, after narrowly missing a vote to shut down the power plant, the Nuclear Regulatory Committee (NRC), decided to investigate the power plant for safety violations.

== Closure ==
A lengthy Nuclear Regulatory Commission investigation started in 1995, following allegations of safety problems at the plant. The NRC staff identified so many problems that Maine Yankee Atomic Power Co. decided "it would be too costly to correct these deficiences to the extent required by the NRC and decided to shut the plant down".

The $500 million decommissioning process ran from 1997 to 2005. In 2000, the first structures were gutted out by workers. In 2003, the reactor pressure vessel was shipped to Barnwell, South Carolina via barge. Finally, in 2004, the facility's containment building was brought down by explosives.

As of 2022, questions remain about the final disposal of the plant's nuclear waste, following the scrapping of the planned national depository.
