= Severin Beliveau =

American politician

Severin Beliveau (born March 15, 1938) is an American attorney, political activist and lobbyist in Maine.

== Political career ==
Beliveau was elected to the Maine House of Representatives in 1966 after graduating from Georgetown University Law Center and was influential in the rise of the Maine Democratic Party in state politics after a century of Republican dominance. He later served in the Maine Senate and, in 1986, unsuccessfully sought the Democratic Party's nomination for Governor. Considered a moderate Democrat, Beliveau lost to the more liberal Maine Attorney General James Tierney.

He is a founding partner at Preti Flaherty, a major law firm in Maine. He was chair of the Maine Democratic Party in the late 1960s.

In December 2011, Beliveau was ranked as the 12th most influential person in Maine politics.

== Family and education ==
Beliveau was born on March 15, 1938, in Rumford, Maine. His Irish mother was Margaret McCarthy and his Franco-American father, Albert J. Beliveau, Sr., was a justice of the Maine Supreme Court. His maternal grandfather, Matthew McCarthy, was the first municipal court judge in Rumford and his uncle, William E. McCarthy, was a Superior Court judge. Beliveau's brother, Albert J. Beliveau, Jr., was Oxford County Judge of Probate.

At the age of 16, Beliveau went to study at St. John's Preparatory School in Danvers, Massachusetts. He went on to receive a Bachelor of Arts degree from Georgetown University in 1960 and a J.D. in 1963 from Georgetown University Law Center.

His wife, Cynthia (née Murray) Beliveau, was born in 1947 in Bangor, Maine. They have four sons. Beliveau's father, Albert Beliveau, and Cynthia's great uncle, Edward P. Murray, served together on the Maine Supreme Judicial Court. They were introduced by her brother, Frank Murray.
