= Robert Murray (Maine politician) =

American politician (born 1959)

Member of the Maine Senate from the Bangor district
- In office 1996–2000
- Succeeded by: Tom Sawyer

Personal details
- Born: June 29, 1959 (age 67) Bangor, Maine
- Party: Democrat
- Profession: Attorney

Robert Emmett Murray Jr. (born June 29, 1959) is an American politician and attorney from Maine. He represented Bangor in the Maine House of Representatives from 1982 to 1986 and the Maine Senate from 1996 to 2000. From 2002 to 2004, Murray served as the commissioner of the Department of Professional and Financial Regulation under Governor John Baldacci.

Murray was born and grew up on Maple Street in Bangor, Maine to Robert Emmett, Sr., and Laura Murray. He earned a BA from Boston College in 1981 and a JD from the University of Maine School of Law in 1985. His brother is Fr. Frank Murray and his sister Cynthia married Severin Beliveau. His great uncle was Edward P. Murray.

In 2011, Baldacci appointed Murray, who had been serving on the District Court bench since 2004, to the Superior Court. He was reappointed in 2017 by Governor Paul Lepage.
