= Sasanoa River =

Coordinates: 43.86147°N 69.72616°W

Location
- Country: United States

Physical characteristics
- Source
  - location: Maine

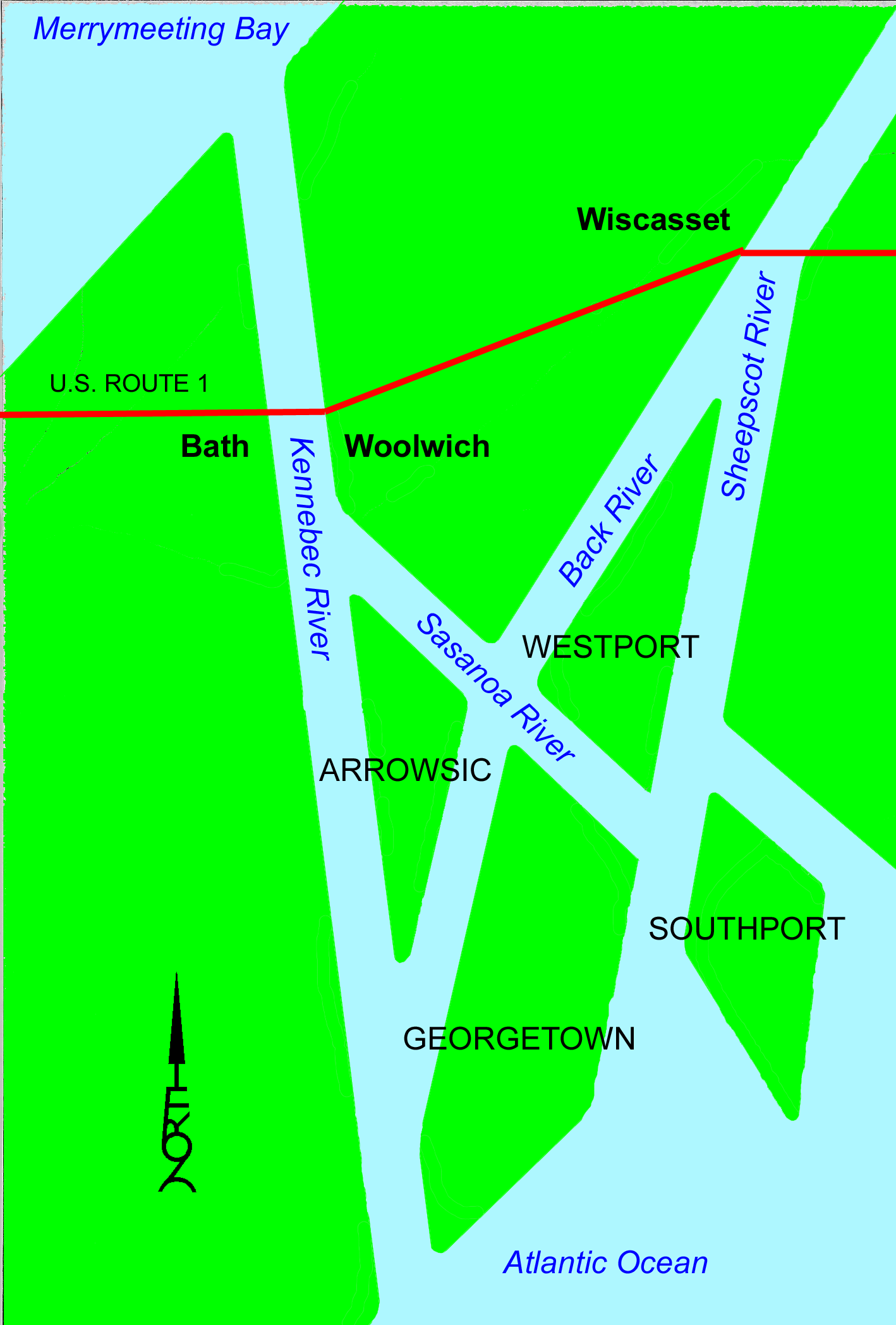

The Sasanoa River is an 8.6-mile-long (13.8 km) tidal channel in the Midcoast region of Maine, connecting the Kennebec River with the Sheepscot River.

The Sasanoa River has two distinct sections. The western section begins at the Kennebec River opposite the city of Bath and runs east, forming the boundary between the towns of Arrowsic and Woolwich, and passing through its narrowest channel at Upper Hell Gate. The western section ends at Hockomock Bay, a water body also crossed by the Back River and containing numerous tidal inlets. The eastern section of the Sasanoa River begins 1 mile (1.6 km) northeast of the river's western section and flows southeast through Lower Hell Gate and Goose Rock Passage to the Sheepscot River. This section of the river forms the boundary between Lincoln and Sagadahoc counties, as well as between the towns of Westport and Georgetown.

== See also ==
- List of rivers of Maine
