= Falmouth High School =

Falmouth High School may refer to:

- Falmouth High School (Massachusetts), Falmouth, Massachusetts
- Falmouth High School (Maine), Falmouth, Maine

== See also ==
- Falmouth School
