= Attorney General Cohen =

Attorney General Cohen may refer to:

- Henry Cohen (politician) (1872–1942), Attorney-General of Victoria
- Herbert B. Cohen (1900–1970), Attorney General of Pennsylvania
- Richard S. Cohen (1937–1998), Attorney General of Maine

== See also ==
- Haim Cohn (1911–2002), Attorney General of Israel
