= John R. McKernan Jr. =

American politician (born 1948)

John McKernan
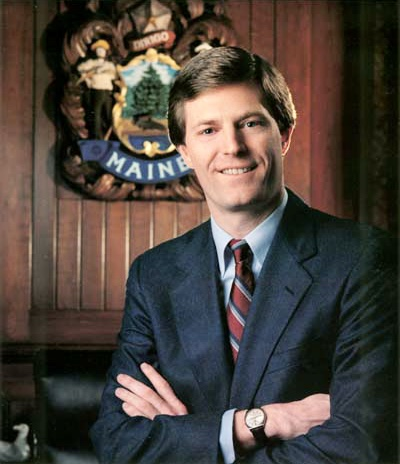
- Official portrait, 1987

71st Governor of Maine
- In office January 7, 1987 – January 5, 1995
- Preceded by: Joseph E. Brennan
- Succeeded by: Angus King

Member of the U.S. House of Representatives from Maine's 1st district
- In office January 3, 1983 – January 3, 1987
- Preceded by: David F. Emery
- Succeeded by: Joseph E. Brennan

Member of the Maine House of Representatives
- In office January 3, 1973 – January 5, 1977
- Preceded by: Multi-member district
- Succeeded by: Multi-member district
- Constituency: Penobscot County district (1973–1975); 83rd district (1975–1977)

Personal details
- Born: John Rettie McKernan Jr. May 20, 1948 (age 78) Bangor, Maine, U.S.
- Party: Republican
- Spouse(s): Judith Files (div. 1978) Olympia Snowe (m. 1989)
- Children: 1
- Education: Dartmouth College (BA); University of Maine, Portland (JD)

Military service
- Allegiance: United States
- Branch/service: United States Army
- Years of service: 1970–1973
- Unit: Maine Army National Guard

John Rettie "Jock" McKernan Jr. (born May 20, 1948) is an American politician who served two terms as the 71st governor of Maine, from 1987 to 1995.

Born in Bangor, Maine, McKernan attended Dartmouth College and then the University of Maine School of Law. A Republican, McKernan was a member of the U.S. House of Representatives before becoming governor. He also served in the state house from 1973 to 1977 and was a delegate to the Republican National Conventions in 1976 and 1984.

== Early life and education ==
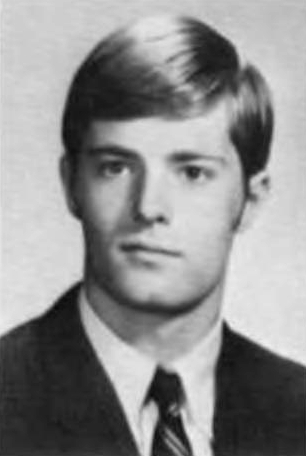
McKernan in the Dartmouth College yearbook, 1970

McKernan was born in Bangor, Maine, on May 20, 1948, the son of Barbara Guild McKernan and John R. McKernan Sr. He was raised in Bangor, where he attended the public schools and graduated from Bangor High School in 1966. After graduating, McKernan attended Dartmouth College in Hanover, New Hampshire, where he received his bachelor's degree in 1970.

He then returned to Maine and joined the Maine Army National Guard, serving from 1970 until 1973. During this time, he moved to Portland, Maine, to pursue studies at the University of Maine School of Law. He completed his Juris Doctor degree in 1974, while already serving in the Maine House of Representatives.

== Career ==
=== Maine House of Representatives ===
McKernan's first entry into politics was being elected to the Maine House of Representatives in 1972. He did so as one of the youngest ever to serve in that capacity, being only 24 years old.

He was later elected to a second term, where his colleagues selected him as assistant Republican floor leader.

He left the state legislature in 1976 to begin practicing law at a Portland law firm.

=== U.S. Representative ===
McKernan was twice elected to the United States House of Representatives, in 1982 and 1984. He narrowly defeated Democrat John M. Kerry by a 50.4–47.9 margin in 1982, but won a landslide re-election in 1984, defeating Democrat Barry Hobbins by a 63.5–36.5 margin.

While he served in the House, he had the unusual distinction of dating the other member of Maine's House delegation – Olympia Snowe. The two had met while they had earlier served in the Maine House of Representatives, and began dating in 1978. During their time together in Congress, McKernan and Snowe had nearly identical voting records. Their similar feelings on issues even translated into reversals of opinion — for example, they both switched from opposing aid to the Nicaraguan rebels to later supporting such aid. While their relationship was widely known, it was not reported much by the Maine press.

McKernan retired from Congress to run for governor in 1986, and was sworn in as governor in January 1987.

GovTrack analysis of McKernan's voting record found McKernan to be the fifth-most moderate Republican in terms of voting record during his tenure, slightly more moderate than Snowe. In 1986, towards the end of his final term in the House, a Congressional Quarterly study found that McKernan had opposed Ronald Reagan's stated position 52 percent of the time, 13th-most among House Republicans, and that Snowe had opposed Reagan's position 53 percent of the time, 12th-most among House Republicans.

=== Governor of Maine ===
==== 1986 election and first term ====
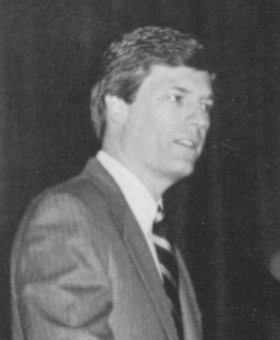
McKernan as Maine governor in the late 1980s

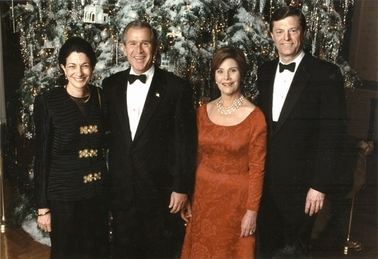
McKernan and his wife, U.S. Senator Olympia Snowe, at a holiday reception at the White House in December 2002

Before the 1986 election, no Republican had occupied the Blaine House in two decades. Incumbent governor Joseph E. Brennan was term limited and could not run again. McKernan declared his intention to run for governor in the fall of 1985, and Brennan declared his candidacy for McKernan's old congressional seat in the first district (which Brennan would eventually win).

McKernan's opponent in the GOP primary, conservative activist Porter Leighton, characterized McKernan as "a very pleasant young man" who "votes more often with the other party than his own." McKernan had cut out a very moderate reputation in Congress, and one study released shortly before the 1986 general election found that McKernan had voted against president the stated position of President Ronald Reagan — a fellow Republican — 52% of the time. McKernan, however, easily dispatched Leighton, receiving over 68% of the vote in the GOP primary. In the general election, McKernan's Democratic opponent was James E. Tierney, former Majority Leader of the Maine House and state Attorney General — though he did also face two independent candidates, Sherry Huber (a former Republican who lost the 1982 GOP nomination for governor) and John Menario.

McKernan based his campaign on better schools and better jobs, believing them to be the keys to making Maine (in his words) "the very best place in America to live, to work and to raise a family." He pledged to pursue both goals without a major tax increase. Additionally, he focused on economic development, claiming that Maine could become what he dubbed "the opportunity state". After a spirited campaign, McKernan emerged on top, besting Tierney by a nine-point margin. However, McKernan received only 39% of the vote in a divided four-way race.

McKernan, just 38 years old on inauguration day, was welcomed with a $46-million surplus. That good financial news would be short-lived, however, as the state would face a number of fiscal challenges in the coming years.

In his first tenure in Augusta, McKernan attempted to grow the Maine economy. He helped initiate a $1.35-million fund to create "centers of innovation," designed to position Maine at the cutting edge of the next technological change. He also worked to expand job training programs, structured to enable the state to quickly change the skills being taught to meet the needs of a new employer. An additional $5.9-million state investment in the University of Maine System was also spearheaded by the governor, intended to enhance its educational and research reputation. His administration gave "qualified support" to a bond which created the Land for Maine's Future program. These efforts were hammered home with the governor's new economic development slogan: "MAINE: We're America's Future Business." The program created "opportunity zones" throughout the state to draw jobs to areas in need of new or additional industry.

In his second year in office, Governor McKernan launched a public-relations campaign intended to enhance the state's image as a place to do business.

For all the work to develop Maine's economy, McKernan also faced a number of difficulties which stunted his efforts. Budget shortfalls began to run rampant toward the end of his term, and legislative battles with opposition Democrats became frequent. The relationship between longtime Speaker of the House John L. Martin and McKernan was poisonous, and the two had difficulty resolving differences over the state budget. The Governor crafted a plan to eliminate or reduce welfare and job-training benefits for thousands of low-income Mainers, while Martin and the Democrats fought to keep funding at a higher level.

The difficult budget fights between the governor and the legislature would prove to be a major issue in McKernan's effort to be re-elected.

==== 1990 election and second term ====
During his announcement for his re-election campaign, McKernan listed as important successes a growth management initiative, a trash reduction and recycling program, and a plan to remove the Kennebec River dam in Augusta by the end of the 1990s. McKernan credited his administration with taking decisive action against illegal drugs, citing the creation of the Bureau of Intergovernmental Drug Enforcement. Troubled by difficult financial issues, McKernan reiterated his claim that Maine had responded to budget difficulties with less impact on taxpayers than other states in the New England region. He pointed out that Maine was the only state in the Northeast that had a balanced budget and that had done it without raising taxes.

Polling in May 1990 showed former governor Joseph Brennan with a nine-point lead over the incumbent governor. McKernan felt that the erosion of his support occurred during the legislative budget battles, and would be reversed in the months before the election, believing that the situation would improve as the state budget continued to hold further into the fiscal year.

The race was so close that the candidates waited until shortly before noon the following day before summoning reporters to make acceptance and concession remarks. Brennan acknowledged that voter margins in his traditional strongholds in southern Maine weren't enough to offset McKernan's strength in rural and northern Maine.

McKernan has characterized his narrow victory as something of a comeback, considering that pollsters showed him 12 points behind Brennan only two months prior. Momentum began to change only in mid-October, McKernan said, when his campaign was able to effectively communicate "not only what we had accomplished but also what was at stake in this election." Brennan said that he saw no fatal flaws in his campaign, but added he was hurt by the long federal budget debate that kept him in Washington when he needed to be campaigning in Maine. "It hurts the dynamic of the campaign when you can't be here," he explained.

McKernan's second term became defined by partisan battles with the state legislature's Democratic majority over fiscal management, given a large budget deficit and a constitution that prohibited borrowing to offset budget gaps. He threatened to invoke a 1976 law permitting the governor to make "fair and equitable" spending reductions to comply with the state's balanced-budget mandate. His specific controversial actions included drafting plans to cut spending unilaterally and rewriting rules to give state agencies more discretion in how they allocate their reduced funds. Democrats objected and took McKernan to the Maine Supreme Judicial Court, but the court upheld the governor's authority to take such action.

McKernan also battled with Democrats about state's workmen's compensation costs, eventually settling with them for a roughly 26% decrease in spending.

== Post-government life ==
- Honorary state chairman for John McCain's 2008 presidential campaign in Maine.
- Served as outside director of ImmuCell Corporation since 1995.
- He became chief executive officer of Education Management Corporation, the parent company of several for-profit colleges, on September 1, 2003, where he served until 2006. He subsequently served as executive chairman.

== Personal life and family ==
McKernan has been married twice. His first marriage was to Judith Files. They had one child together, Peter McKernan. The couple subsequently divorced in 1978. On January 23, 1991, Peter died of a previously undetected heart problem after lying in a coma for nine days. He had collapsed during baseball practice at Dartmouth College. He was 20 years old at the time, played junior varsity baseball at Dartmouth, and had recently joined the school's Beta Theta Pi fraternity.

In 1989, McKernan married eventual U.S. Senator Olympia Snowe after dating her for several years. They met in the early 1980s as Maine state representatives, later serving as the only U.S. representatives from Maine together.

== Electoral history ==
1982 Maine Republican congressional primary results, 1st district
Party	Candidate	Votes	%
Republican	John McKernan	34,162	77.41%
Republican	Oram R. Lawry III	9,968	22.59%
Total votes		44,130	100.00

1982 Maine congressional election results, 1st district
Party	Candidate	Votes	%	±%
Republican	John R. McKernan Jr.	124,850	50.35%	−
Democratic	John M. Kerry	118,884	47.95%	−
Independent	Gregory J. Flemming	4,221	1.70%	−
Turnout		247,955		
Republican hold		Swing		

1984 Maine congressional election results, 1st district
Party	Candidate	Votes	%	±%
Republican	John R. McKernan Jr.	182,785	63.52%	−
Democratic	Barry Hobbins	104,972	36.48%	−
Turnout		287,757		
Republican hold		Swing		

1986 Maine Republican gubernatorial primary results
Party	Candidate	Votes	%
Republican	John McKernan	79,393	68.37%
Republican	Porter Leighton	24,631	31.61%
Republican	Others	31	0.02%
Total votes		116,129	100.00

1986 Maine gubernatorial election results
Party	Candidate	Votes	%	±%
Republican	John R. McKernan Jr.	170,312	39.90%	−
Democratic	James Tierney	128,744	30.16%	−
Independent	Sherry Huber	64,317	15.07%	−
Independent	John Menario	63,474	14.87%	−
Plurality		41,568	9.74%	
Turnout		427,120		
Republican gain from Democratic		Swing		

1990 Maine gubernatorial election results
Party	Candidate	Votes	%	±%
Republican	John R. McKernan Jr. (incumbent)	243,766	46.68%	−
Democratic	Joseph E. Brennan	230,038	44.05%	−
Independent	Andrew Adam	48,377	9.27%	−
Plurality		13,728	2.63%	
Turnout		522,181		
Republican hold		Swing		

U.S. House of Representatives
Preceded by David F. Emery	Member of the U.S. House of Representatives from Maine's 1st congressional district 1983–1987	Succeeded by Joseph E. Brennan
Party political offices
Preceded by Charles Cragin	Republican nominee for Governor of Maine; 1986, 1990	Succeeded by Susan Collins
Preceded by George Voinovich	Chair of the Republican Governors Association; 1993–1994	Succeeded by Mike Leavitt
Political offices
Preceded by Joseph E. Brennan	Governor of Maine; 1987–1995	Succeeded by Angus King
U.S. order of precedence (ceremonial)
Preceded by Kenneth M. Curtis as Former Governor	Order of precedence of the United States	Succeeded by John Baldacci as Former Governor
