= David Redmond (politician) =

American politician (1932–2006)

Chief of Staff to the Governor of Maine
- In office 1983–1985
- Governor: Joseph E. Brennan
- Preceded by: David Flanagan
- Succeeded by: Peter Danton

Member of the Executive Council of Maine from the 1st district
- In office January 2, 1975 – January 4, 1977
- Governor: James B. Longley
- Preceded by: Richard W. Logan
- Succeeded by: Office abolished
- Constituency: York and Oxford

Personal details
- Born: David Edward Redmond; January 1, 1932; Portland, Maine, U.S.
- Died: November 25, 2006 (aged 74); Bonita Springs, Florida, U.S.
- Political party: Democratic
- Education: Ricker College; University of Maine at Portland

Military service
- Branch/service: United States Army
- Battles/wars: Korean War

David Edward Redmond (January 1, 1932 – November 25, 2006) was an American politician who served as a member of the Executive Council of Maine from 1975 until the body's abolition in 1977. A member of the Democratic Party, he later served as the chief of staff to Governor Joseph E. Brennan and ran unsuccessfully to be his party's gubernatorial nominee in 1986.

Political offices
Preceded by Richard W. Logan	Member of the Executive Council of Maine from the 1st district 1975–1977	Office abolished
Preceded by David Flanagan	Chief of Staff to the Governor of Maine; 1983–1985	Succeeded by Peter Danton
