= Back River (Sheepscot River tributary) =

Back River (Boothbay, Maine)

Location
- Country: United States
- State: Maine
- Municipality: Boothbay

Physical characteristics
- Source: Cross River
  - coordinates: 43.9275°N 69.662°W
- Mouth: Sheepscot River
  - location: Sawyer Island
  - coordinates: 43.8755°N 69.6825°W
- Length: 4.8 mi (7.7 km)

The Back River is a 4.8-mile-long (7.7 km) tidal channel in the town of Boothbay, Maine, in the United States. It defines the east and south sides of Barters Island and connects with the Sheepscot River, which forms the west side of the island. The Cross River joins the north end of the Back River with the Sheepscot River to the west.

Approximately 4 miles (6.4 km) north of where the river joins the Sheepscot River, another waterway of the same name connects with the Sheepscot River.

== See also ==
- Back River (Kennebec River)
- List of rivers of Maine
