= Bewitched (1945 film) =

1945 film by Arch Oboler

- Theatrical release poster
- Directed by: Arch Oboler
- Written by: Arch Oboler
- Based on: the story "Alter Ego" by Arch Oboler
- Produced by: Jerry Bresler
- Starring: Phyllis Thaxter; Edmund Gwenn
- Cinematography: Charles Salerno Jr.
- Edited by: Harry Komer
- Music by: Bronislau Kaper
- Distributed by: Metro-Goldwyn-Mayer
- Release date: July 4, 1945 (United States)
- Running time: 65 minutes
- Country: United States
- Language: English

Bewitched is a 1945 American film noir directed and written by Arch Oboler. The drama features Phyllis Thaxter and Edmund Gwenn.

== Plot ==
The story is told as a flashback: It is late at night, and Dr. Bergson (Edmund Gwenn) is dictating case notes to his secretary. He suggests pausing but she is so intrigued by the case that she asks him to continue.

On the night of a lovely party celebrating her engagement to Bob Arnold (Harry H. Daniels Jr.), a demure young woman named Joan Ellis (Phyllis Thaxter) at last succumbs to the voice in her head (voiced by Audrey Totter, unbilled) and flees her Midwestern home to New York City, leaving behind a loving family and circle of friends who are shocked, bewildered and frightened for her. She leaves a note asking her parents (Addison Richards, Kathleen Lockhart) not to search for her.

Going by the name Joan Smith, she builds a new life in the city and falls in love with Eric Russell (Horace McNally), an attorney. The voice, which calls itself Karen, approves of this mature man, and when Karen emerges, briefly, while they are on a river cruise, she kisses him with a fiercely devouring, possessive passion that is unnerving. When Joan regains control, she asks “What did I do?” and bursts into tears. Eric is very worried, but she won't talk to him about it. (Joan's inability to tell anyone about what she is experiencing adds greatly to the tension and suspense in the film. Repeatedly, the story reaches a point where she might be expected to confide in someone, but the moments always pass.)

At last, after a long search, loving, loyal Bob finds her. He is thrilled, but while he is helping her pack, Karen takes control of Joan's right hand and compels her to pick up a pair of scissors and stab him in the back. She is put on trial for murder, a capital offense. Dr. Bergson is brought in as an expert witness; He says that Joan is not insane. She remains silent, and Eric uses this silence to convince the jury that there is more to the story and, whatever the truth may be, she is innocent of murder. After a long deliberation, the jury returns, smiling; clearly they have found her not guilty. In Joan's mind, Karen exults: She will have Eric now, and when she tires of him, he will meet the same fate as Bob. Joan leaps to her feet screaming over and over “I’m guilty!”

In prison awaiting execution, Joan refuses to explain to anyone. Lying on her cot in utter misery, she weakly murmurs to Eric “I want to die. When I die, she dies.”

This sets Dr. Bergson thinking, and, with the execution imminent, he persuades the governor (Minor Watson) to listen to his theory—that there are two women living in one body, one guilty and one innocent. He takes a book from the governor's library shelf that addresses this very subject, but it is unread, and he has to ask the governor's wife (Virginia Brissac) for a paper knife to slit some pages. Eric is also present.

Saying grimly “There will be an execution tonight,” Dr. Bergson hypnotizes Joan. In the film, Joan and Karen emerge—transparent, in the classic photographic representation of spirits—and stand on each side of Joan's seated form. Karen wears heavy make up and her expression is a feral smile. Neither entity speaks. Dr. Bergstrom tells Joan that she is getting stronger and Karen that she is getting weaker—dying in fact. Under his repeated assaults, the image of Karen fades and disappears. Joan slumps forward into Eric's arms and then straightens, smiling.

== Cast ==
- Phyllis Thaxter as Joan Alris Ellis
- Edmund Gwenn as Dr. Bergson
- Henry H. Daniels Jr. as Bob Arnold
- Addison Richards as John Ellis
- Kathleen Lockhart as Mrs. Ellis
- Francis Pierlot as Dr. George Wilton
- Sharon McManus as Small Girl
- Gladys Blake as Glenda
- Will Wright as Mr. Herkheimer
- Stephen McNally as Eric Russell (billed as "Horace McNally")
- Oscar O'Shea as Capt. O'Malley
- Minor Watson as Governor
- Virginia Brissac as Martha—Governor's Wife

== Production ==
The film was produced in November–December 1944, while World War II was raging. It opens and closes with a voice over that justifies the telling of Joan's story at such a time.

According to Jeremy Arnold at TCM.com, the film “had an extremely low budget. But Oboler's radio expertise made the most of it, and he filled the picture with stylistic flourishes that came from radio. The use of sound effects, editing, stylized dialogue, and heightened, punchy music all reveal the radio influence. The music, in fact, was so important to Oboler that he fought to get a good composer who was actually scoring 'A' movies - Bronislau Kaper, who had just finished scoring Gaslight (1944) and Without Love (1945). Finally, Oboler gave Thaxter's evil personality its own voice, well supplied by an unbilled Audrey Totter, a film noir fixture (Lady in the Lake (1947), Tension, (1950)) whose career began in radio in 1939.”

== Critical reception ==
When the film was first released, the staff at Variety liked it and wrote "Produced on a low budget, with a sterling cast of actors' actors, this picture just oozes with class because of the excellent adaptation and direction it has been given by radio's Arch Oboler, author of the story "Alter Ego", on which the film is based. Climax follows climax, strong performance follows strong performance in this thrilling psychopathic study of a girl obsessed by an inner voice that drives her to murder." In The Nation in 1945, critic James Agee stated, "Oboler manages the first persuasive imitations of stream of consciousness I know of in a movie. Much more often, he bores to desperation with the vulgarity and mere violence of his "effects." As a moving picture Bewitched is at moments vigorous and at all times essentially lifeless." Leslie Halliwell wasn't impressed: "Hilarious nonsense, ancestor of the Eve and Lizzie schizos of the fifties." Leonard Maltin wrote: "Interesting idea, especially for its time, but heavy-handed."
