= Frank J. Murray (priest) =

American Catholic priest and politician

Rev. Frank J. Murray (born March 12, 1949) is an American Catholic priest and former Democratic state representative from Maine.

== Early life ==
Murray was born and grew up on Maple Street in Bangor, Maine to Robert Emmett and Laura Murray. Both of his grandfathers were named Frank J. He has a younger brother, Robert Emmett, Jr., and an older sister, Cynthia, who married Severin Beliveau. His great uncle was Edward P. Murray.

Murray attended St. John's School and then John Bapst Memorial High School. He is of French, English, and Irish descent. His father was active in Democratic politics.

== Career ==
=== Maine House ===
Murray attended the University of Maine at Orono where he received a bachelor's degree in mathematics. During his junior and senior years in 1969 and 1970, when he was 20 years old, he ran for a seat in the Maine House of Representatives (Note: By the time he was sworn in, Murray was 21 years old, the constitutional minimum age.). When elected, Murray was the youngest member of the House. Murray put off graduation for a semester to go to work at the state capital, and finished his degree in between sessions of the legislature.

He was then reelected for a second term in the Maine House. In the House, Murray served on the education and reapportionment committees. Murray then ran for a seat in the Maine Senate in 1974 but was defeated by 163 votes. The following January he ran for Secretary of State, which is elected by the members of the House and Senate, but lost by a single vote.

=== Other political activities ===
In 1972 he ran Elmer Violette, a close friend's, congressional campaign. He served as a delegate to a number of Maine Democratic Party conventions and the 1972 Democratic National Convention. Murray also served on the Maine Human Rights Commission.

=== Post-political career ===
For four years he taught math at John Bapst Memorial High School in Bangor, where he also served as a coach.

== Ministry ==
He entered the seminary in 1977 at Theological College at The Catholic University of America and received a Master's of Divinity in 1981. He was ordained by Bishop Edward C. O'Leary on June 6, 1981 at St. John Church in Bangor. During his time at Catholic University, President Jimmy Carter came to Bangor and stayed at the Murray family home. When Carter learned that Murray was a student at Catholic University, he invited Murray to fly back to Washington on Air Force One.

His first assignment as a priest, which lasted for six years, was a chaplain at the Maine Medical Center. While remaining at the hospital, he did campus ministry at the University of Southern Maine and did pastoral work at Sacred Heart Parish in Portland beginning in 1983. Murray became the campus minister at the University of Maine in July 1987, a post he held for seven years, while also serving as pastor of Our Lady of Wisdom in Orono.

Following this, in 1989 he served in a number of parishes, including at St. Mary Parish in Bangor for nine years. He then moved to Sacred Heart parish, St. Louis parish, and St. Philip Parish, all in Auburn in 2003 where he stayed for six years. Murray was named administrator of the newly formed All Saints Parish in Brunswick in July 2009 and, in May 2010, he was named pastor. As of 2019, he is pastor of St. Paul the Apostle parish in Bangor, a six church parish.

Murray won the Lifetime Service Award in 2019, Theological College's centennial year. He has also served as the director of vocations and the director of seminarians for the Diocese of Portland.
