= Norman L. Bassett =

American judge (1869–1931)

Norman Leslie Bassett (June 23, 1869 – September 29, 1931), of Augusta, Maine, was a justice of the Maine Supreme Judicial Court from March 26, 1925, to September 9, 1930.

== Early life, education, and career ==
Born in Winslow, Maine, Bassett attended the public schools, and graduated from the Coburn Classical Institute, in 1887. He received a BA from Colby College in 1891, where he was elected to Phi Beta Kappa, and where he remained until 1895 as a teacher of Greek and Latin. He entered Harvard Law School, where he was chosen as an editor of the Harvard Law Review, receiving a Bachelor of Laws in 1898.

Bassett then entered into a law partnership with his uncle, Leslie C. Cornish in Augusta, Maine. As an attorney, Bassett preferred performing transactional work to courtroom litigation, spending a great deal of his time preparing trust and estate documents. Bassett also served on the Board of Trustees of Colby College, and as a Director, and later President, of the Augusta Savings Bank. The Maine State Bar Association reported that "[s]ix years later Leslie C. Cornish was appointed as an associate justice of the Supreme Judicial Court of Maine, and Norman L. Bassett continued in practice until March 26, 1925, when he in turn was appointed as an Associate Justice".

== Personal life ==
Basset had two brothers, J. Colby and George K., who also became lawyers, and a sister, Alice, who died young. Bassett was active in the Augusta YMCA, the Unitarian Church and the Lithgow Public Library.

He married Lula Holden in Bennington, Vermont in 1903. He died in Augusta, Maine, and was memorialized by the Maine State Bar Association the following month.

Political offices
Preceded by Scott Wilson	Justice of the Maine Supreme Judicial Court; 1925–1930	Succeeded by Sidney St. Felix Thaxter
