= Gilbert Lea =

American football player (1912–2008)

Princeton Tigers
- Position: End

Personal information
- Born: December 16, 1912; Bala Cynwyd, Pennsylvania, U.S.
- Died: May 4, 2008 (aged 95); Vero Beach, Florida, U.S.

Career information
- College: Princeton (1933–1935)

Awards and highlights
- Second-team All-American (1935); National Championships (1933, 1935)

Other information
- Military Service WW II
- Allegiance: United States
- Branch: U.S. Army
- Service years: 1941–1945
- Rank: Lieutenant colonel
- Units: 13th Armored Division; Third Army
- Awards: Battle stars; Bronze Star Medal; Air Medal

Gilbert Lea (December 16, 1912 – May 4, 2008) was an American football player, army veteran, advertising executive, and publisher.

== Early life ==
Lea was born in 1912 at Bala Cynwyd, Pennsylvania. He grew up in Wynnewood, Pennsylvania. His father was Langdon Lea, a three time consensus All-American tackle at Princeton who later served as head football coach at Princeton and the University of Michigan. A history of Princeton football notes that Gilbert Lea was a "tiger from birth," as his father raised him to play football "as he had ... all out."

Lea attended the Montgomery School and later St. Paul's School, a private preparatory school in Concord, New Hampshire. At St. Paul's Lea was captain of the football team and received the Gordon Medal as the school's best all-around athlete.

== Princeton ==
Following in his father's footsteps, Lea became a star of the Princeton football teams from 1933 to 1935. He played at the end position, on both offense and defense, for Princeton teams coached by College Football Hall of Famer Fritz Crisler. Crisler's teams, with Lea at end, were ranked No. 1 in the nation in both 1933 and 1935. In 1935, Lea was a consensus second-team All-American, including spots on the All-American teams selected by the Associated Press and the New York Sun.

== Military and later years ==
During World War II, Lea served in the U.S. Army as an artillery instructor at Fort Sill, Oklahoma and then helped build the 13th Armored Division. He was later sent to Europe as a battalion commander of an armored artillery unit attached to the Third Army commanded by General George Patton. He was a lieutenant colonel who earned several battle stars and both an Air Medal and the Bronze Star.

After World War II, Lea worked in the publishing and advertising business for most of his life, for Time magazine (1936–1948), Business Week, McGraw-Hill, and McCall's magazine. From 1957 to 1967, Lea worked at Ogilvy & Mather as vice president in charge of new business. He lived in Princeton, New Jersey, from 1936 to 1961.

In 1962, Lea married actress Phyllis Thaxter and they were married for 46 years until his death. In 1967, Lea purchased the Tower Publishing Company of Portland, Maine, which he operated until 1982. Lea and his wife moved to Vero Beach, Florida in 1982 where he died in 2008 at age 95.

== See also ==
- 1935 College Football All-America Team
