= Cross River (Maine) =

Coordinates: 43.92480°N 69.67255°W

Location
- Country: United States

Physical characteristics
- Source
  - location: Maine

The Cross River is a 5.0-mile-long (8.0 km) tidal river in Maine. It is a tributary of the Sheepscot River.

The Cross River begins in the town of Boothbay and runs north. Turning west, it becomes the boundary between Boothbay and Edgecomb and continues to the Sheepscot River, at the three-way town boundary intersection between Boothbay, Edgecomb, and Westport.

== See also ==
- List of rivers of Maine
