= Squire Tarbox House =

Historic house in Maine, United States

- U.S. National Register of Historic Places
- Location within Maine Location within the United States
- Location: 1181 Main Rd., Westport, Maine
- Coordinates: 43°54′5″N 69°42′30″W
- Area: 1 acre (0.40 ha)
- Built: 1763
- Architectural style: Federal
- NRHP reference No.: 85000725
- Added to NRHP: April 11, 1985

The Squire Tarbox House is a historic house at 1181 Main Road in Westport, Maine. Built in 1763 and enlarged in 1820, it is a fine local example of Georgian and Federal architecture. It was listed on the National Register of Historic Places in 1985, and is presently home to the Squire Tarbox Inn.

== Description and history ==
The Squire Tarbox House stands on the west side of Main Road (Maine State Route 144), near the geographic center of the rural island community of Westport. It is a long connected farmstead, with the two story main house at the northern end, connected via single-story ells to a carriage barn, with a further ell just to the barn's south. The main house has a rectangular wood frame, with a hip roof pierced by interior chimneys. The main facade is five bays wide, with the center entrance flanked by pilasters and topped by an entablature and cornice. The interior retains original Federal period woodwork, especially in the main parlor.

The oldest portion of the house is the single-story ell extending behind the present main block. Built in 1763, it originally stood on a hill north of this location, and was moved here in 1819 by Samuel Tarbox, who had bought it from John Parsons in 1806. Dubbed "squire" due to his importance in the town, Tarbox was instrumental in securing the separation of Westport from Edgecomb, and was probably its wealthiest resident. He served on Westport's inaugural board of selectmen in 1828.

== See also ==
- National Register of Historic Places listings in Lincoln County, Maine
