= Albert Beliveau =

American judge (1887–1971)

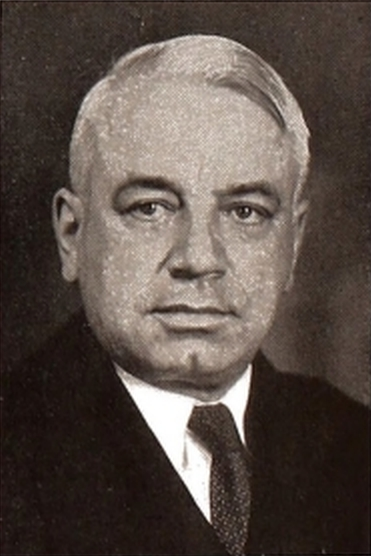
Beliveau circa 1935

Albert Beliveau (March 27, 1887 – October 23, 1971) of Rumford, Maine was a justice of the Maine Supreme Judicial Court from March 3, 1954, to March 25, 1958. He was a Roman Catholic, and his son was Severin Beliveau.

== Early life ==
Born in Lewiston, Maine, to French-Canadian parents, Beliveau worked in local foundries and mills as a young man, before deciding to pursue a legal career. In 1906, he quit his job at the mill and went to work for a local law office, where he remained for three years as an office worker, while studying law on his own time. He received an LL.B. from the University of Maine School of Law in 1911. Beliveau served in the United States Army in France during World War I, "where his French-Canadian heritage and legal experience was helpful in negotiations with the French, who were qualified to receive reparations for their war claims".

== Judicial career ==
In 1935, Governor Louis J. Brann appointed Beliveau to the Maine Superior Court. He was then appointed to the Maine Supreme Judicial Court by Governor Burton M. Cross, in 1954.

Political offices
Preceded by Sidney St. Felix Thaxter	Justice of the Maine Supreme Judicial Court; 1954–1958	Succeeded by Cecil J. Siddall
