= Phyllis Thaxter =

American actress (1919–2012)

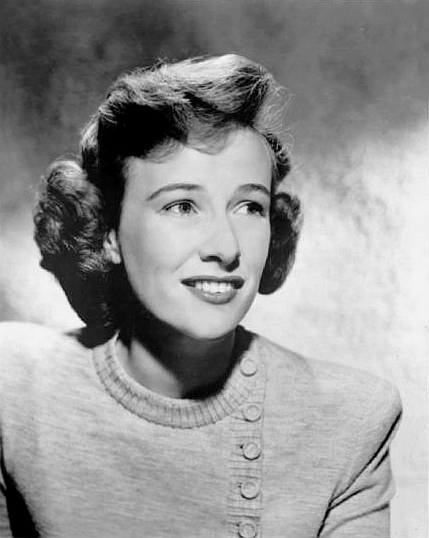
- Thaxter in 1955
- Born: Phyllis St. Felix Thaxter; November 20, 1919; Portland, Maine, U.S.
- Died: August 14, 2012 (aged 92); Longwood, Florida, U.S.
- Occupation: Actress
- Years active: 1940–1992
- Known for: Thirty Seconds Over Tokyo; Superman
- Political party: Republican
- Spouses: James T. Aubrey (m. 1944; div. 1962) Gilbert Lea (m. 1962; died 2008)
- Children: 2
- Relatives: Sidney W. Thaxter (grandfather)
- Awards: Hollywood Walk of Fame

Phyllis St. Felix Thaxter (November 20, 1919 – August 14, 2012) was an American actress. She is best known for portraying Ellen Lawson in Thirty Seconds Over Tokyo (1944) and Martha "Ma" Kent in Superman (1978). She also appeared in Bewitched (1945), Blood on the Moon (1948), and The World of Henry Orient (1964).

== Early life ==
Thaxter was born in Portland, Maine, the youngest of three children of Phyllis (nee Schuyler) Thaxter, former actress, and future Maine Supreme Court justice Sidney St. Felix Thaxter; her siblings were brother Sidney W. Thaxter and sister Hildegarde Schuyler Thaxter (later the wife of federal judge Edward Thaxter Gignoux). Her grandfather, Major Sidney W. Thaxter, was awarded the Medal of Honor during the American Civil War.

== Career ==
Before appearing in films, Thaxter was on the stage. When Dorothy McGuire went to Hollywood, Thaxter replaced her in the Broadway play Claudia. In 1944, she signed a contract with Metro-Goldwyn-Mayer. Her movie debut was in the 1944 wartime film Thirty Seconds Over Tokyo. In the 1945 film-noir Bewitched, Thaxter played Joan Alris Ellis, a woman with split personality. In 1948, she played a cattle owner's daughter in Blood on the Moon.

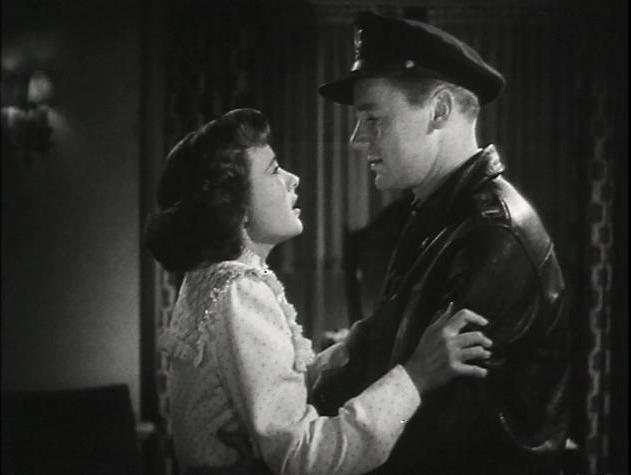
Photo of Phyllis Thaxter and Van Johnson from Thirty Seconds Over Tokyo (1944)

On August 15, 1952, Thaxter, having recently completed work on Operation Secret and Springfield Rifle and awaiting the birth of her second child, was hospitalized with what was described as a "mild" and "non-paralytic" case of polio. Although the illness did not impact her pregnancy, it proved sufficiently serious to end Thaxter's film career, when the following month, columnist Hedda Hopper reported that the actress's contract with Warner Bros. had, "by mutual agreement", been "quietly washed up". Of the remaining, predominantly TV-focused four decades of Thaxter's career, the big-screen portion comprised four widely spaced credits.

Thaxter appeared in television series such as Rawhide, portraying Pauline Cushman in the episode "The Blue Spy" (1961); The Alfred Hitchcock Hour, portraying a paralyzed wife being terrorized by her husband in the episode "The Long Silence" (1963); Wagon Train ("The Christine Elliott Story" and "The Vivian Carter Story"); The Twilight Zone ("Young Man's Fancy"); and Alfred Hitchcock Presents.

She returned to Broadway, appearing in Take Her, She's Mine at the Biltmore in 1961.

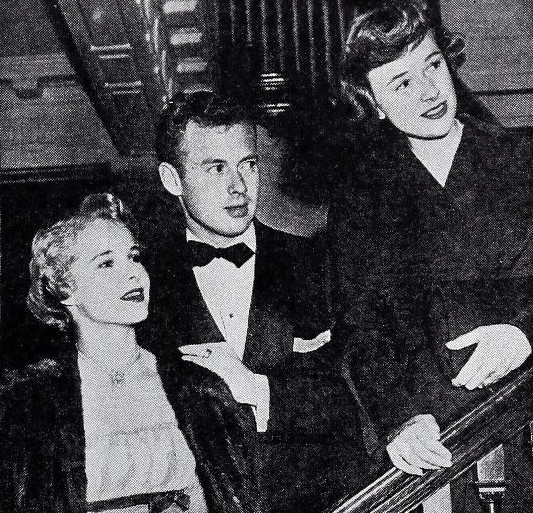
Photo of Mona Freeman, her husband Pat Nerney, and Phyllis Thaxter depicted in Photoplay, 1949

In 1978, Thaxter was cast with Glenn Ford as Jonathan and Martha Kent in the blockbuster film Superman. In 1992, she appeared in the season-nine "Family Secrets" episode of Murder, She Wrote.

In 2003, Thaxter had a seconds-long appearance in the Midsomer Murders episode "The Fisher King" (season seven, episode three).

== Personal life ==
Patricia Bosworth, in her biography of Montgomery Clift, tells of Thaxter's close relationship with Clift in the early 1940s, writing that they "seemed so close that a great many people assumed they would eventually marry".

While at MGM, Phyllis Thaxter married James T. Aubrey Jr., who later became president of CBS-TV and MGM. They had two children. The couple divorced in 1962.

In 1962, Thaxter married Gilbert Lea. They were married for 46 years until his death on May 4, 2008. Her family and she were Episcopalians, and her maternal grandfather was a minister. During her time of residency in California, she was a member of the All Saints Episcopal Church in Beverly Hills, where she additionally held the wedding of her first marriage in November 1944.

She was a staunch Republican who dedicated a significant amount of her personal time and financial resources toward various conservative political causes during her career. Throughout her life, she remained a highly visible supporter of the party, attending multiple Republican National Conventions, galas, and key fund-raisers. She stepped into the political arena to actively campaign for major figures on the presidential stage, including Wendell Willkie, Thomas E. Dewey, Dwight D. Eisenhower, Richard Nixon, and Ronald Reagan. Her activism was especially pronounced during her years as a California resident, during which she integrated her ideological beliefs directly into the local community by operating as an engaged member of the Hollywood Republican Committee, lending her voice to the Motion Picture Alliance for the Preservation of American Ideals, and regularly organizing with the Bel-Air Republican Women's Group.

== Death ==
Thaxter died on August 14, 2012, aged 92, in Longwood, Florida after an eight-year period with Alzheimer's disease.

She was cremated, and her ashes were scattered in Maine.

== Filmography ==
=== Film ===
Year	Title	Role
1944	Thirty Seconds Over Tokyo	Ellen Lawson
1945	Bewitched	Joan Alris Ellis
1945	Week-End at the Waldorf	Cynthia Drew
1947	The Sea of Grass	Sara Beth Brewton
1947	Living in a Big Way	Peggy Randall
1948	Tenth Avenue Angel	Helen Mills
1948	The Sign of the Ram	Sherida Binyon
1948	Blood on the Moon	Carol Lufton
1948	Act of Violence	Ann
1950	No Man of Her Own	Patrice Harkness
1950	The Breaking Point	Lucy Morgan
1951	Fort Worth	Flora Talbot
1951	Jim Thorpe – All-American	Margaret Miller
1951	Come Fill the Cup	Paula Copeland
1952	She's Working Her Way Through College	Helen Palmer
1952	Springfield Rifle	Erin Kearney
1952	Operation Secret	Maria Corbet
1955	Women's Prison	Helene Jensen
1957	Man Afraid	Lisa Collins
1964	The World of Henry Orient	Mrs. Avis Gilbert
1978	Superman	Martha "Ma" Kent

=== Selected television appearances ===
Year	Title	Role	Notes
1953-1956	Lux Video Theatre	various characters	Season 3 Episode 42: "Wind on the Way" as Diana Forbes (1953) Season 4 Episode 5: "Anniversary" as Fran (1953) Season 4 Episode 30: "The Girl Who Couldn't Cry" as Anne (1954) Season 5 Episode 21: "Penny Serenade" as Julie (1955) Season 5 Episode 40: "Thunder on the Hill" as Sister Mary (1955) Season 6 Episode 13: "Holiday Affair" as Connie Ennis (1955) Season 6 Episode 33: "The Night of January Sixteenth" as Karen (1956)
1954	The Motorola Television Hour	Gladys Mitchell	Episode: "Atomic Attack"
1955	Stage 7	Muriel Blandings	Episode: "The Hayfield"
1956-1960	Alfred Hitchcock Presents	various characters	Season 1 Episode 30: "Never Again" as Karen Sewart (1956) Season 2 Episode 2: "Fog Closing In" as Mary Summers (1956) Season 2 Episode 20: "Malice Domestic" as Annette Borden (1957) Season 3 Episode 11: "The Deadly" as Margot Brenner (1957) Season 4 Episode 9: "Murder Me Twice" as Lucy Pryor (1958) Season 6 Episode 5: "The Five-Forty-Eight" as Miss Dent (1960)
1957	Studio One	Laura Morgan	Episode: "The Dark Corner"
1958	The Frank Sinatra Show	Jean Armstrong	Episode: "The Seedling Doubt"
1959-1960	Wagon Train	various characters	Season 2 Episode 23: "The Vivian Carter Story" as Vivian Carter (1959) Season 3 Episode 24: "The Christine Elliot Story" as Christine Elliot (1960)
1961	Rawhide	Pauline Cushman	Episode: "The Blue Spy"
1962	The Twilight Zone	Virginia Lane Walker	Episode: "Young Man's Fancy"
1963-1964	The Alfred Hitchcock Hour	various characters	Season 1 Episode 25: "The Long Silence" as Nora Cory Manson (1963) Season 2 Episode 6: "Nothing Ever Happens in Linvale" as Mrs. Logan (1963) Season 3 Episode 2: "Change of Address" as Elsa Hollands (1964)
1964	The Fugitive	Enid Langer	Episode: "Detour on a Road Going Nowhere"
1967	Coronet Blue	Eleanor Barclay	Episode: "Faces"
1968	The Invaders	Sarah Concannon	Episode: "The Peacemaker"
1969	Bonanza	Ruth Manning	Episode: "The Clarion"
1970	Medical Center	Celia Jennings	Episode: "Junkie"
1971	Incident in San Francisco	Lois Harmon	TV movie
1972	The Longest Night	Norma Chambers	ABC Movie of the Week
1974	Marcus Welby, M.D.	Kate Tannahill	Episode: "A Full Life"
1975	Barnaby Jones	Aunt Meg Catlin	Episode: "Murder Once Removed"
1976	Once an Eagle	Alma Caldwell	
1985	American Playhouse	Rebecca Nurse	3 episodes
1992	Murder, She Wrote	Emily Weymouth	Episode: "Family Secrets"

=== Radio appearances ===
Year	Program	Episode/source
1952	Stars in the Air	Christmas in Connecticut
1953	Lux Radio Theatre	Close to My Heart
1953	Lux Radio Theatre	The Bishop's Wife
1955	Lux Radio Theatre	The Bishop's Wife
