= Sidney W. Thaxter =

American military officer (1839–1908)

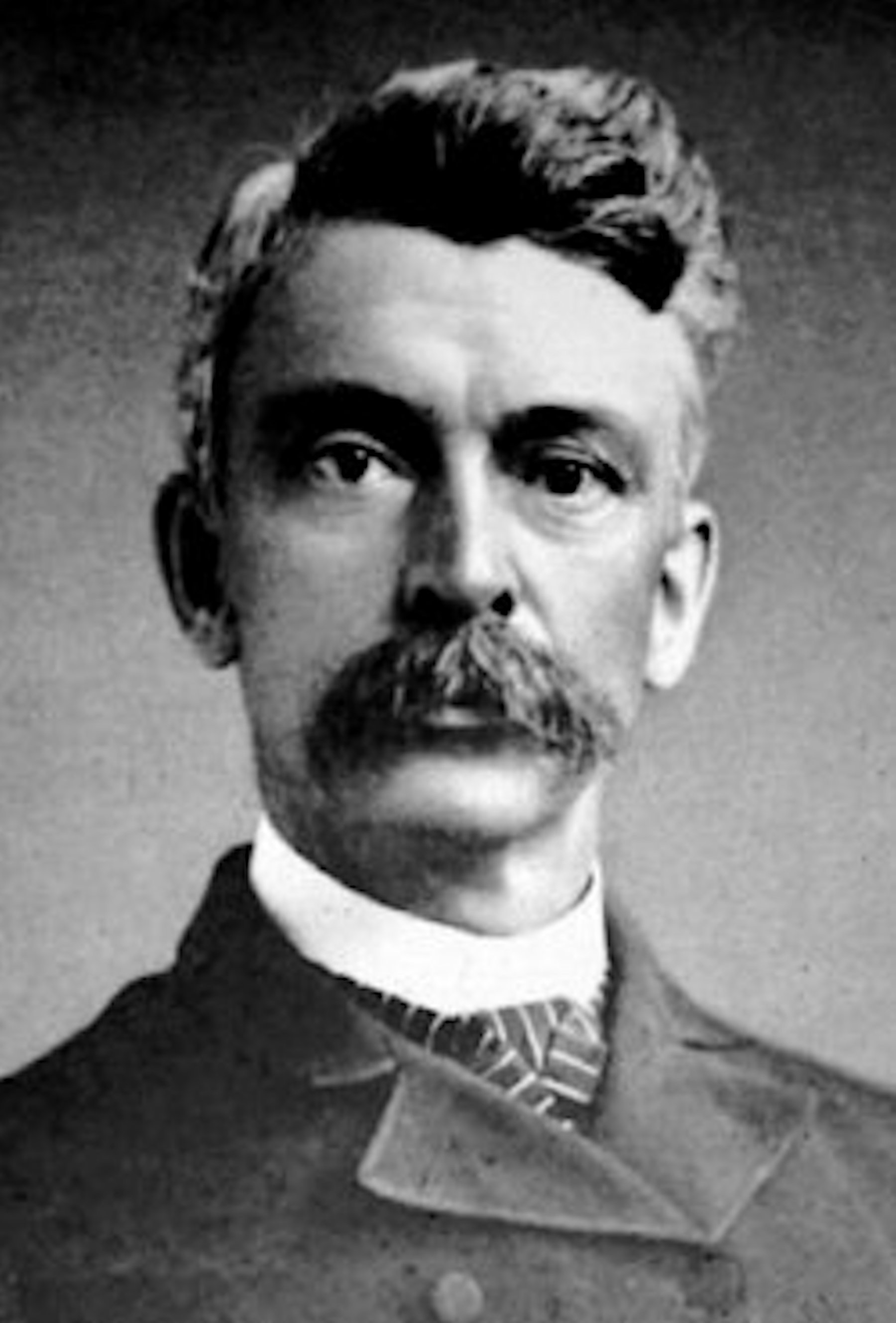

Major Sidney Warren Thaxter (September 8, 1839 – November 10, 1908) was an American Civil War Major and Medal of Honor recipient.

== Personal ==
Thaxter was born in Bangor, Maine on September 8, 1839.

He married Laura May Farnham in 1866. She died in June 1880. He remarried in 1882 to Julia St. Felix Thom. They had three children including Judge Sidney St. Felix Thaxter. Actress Phyllis Thaxter was his granddaughter.

He died from liver cancer in Portland, Maine on November 10, 1908, and is buried in Evergreen Cemetery.

== Military ==
During the Civil War, Thaxter was a member of the 1st Maine Volunteer Cavalry Regiment, rising to the rank of major. He was awarded the Medal of Honor (MOH) for remaining with his unit beyond the terms of his contract while participating at the Battle of Boydton Plank Road in October 1864. (The US government awarded 1,523 MOH during the Civil War, typically for administrative purposes that did not involve gallantry.) After the war, he became a companion of the Maine Commandery of the Military Order of the Loyal Legion of the United States.

Issued on September 10, 1897, his citation read

The President of the United States of America, in the name of Congress, takes pleasure in presenting the Medal of Honor to Major Sidney Warren Thaxter, United States Army, for extraordinary heroism on 27 October 1864, while serving with 1st Maine Cavalry, in action at Hatcher's Run, Virginia. Major Thaxter voluntarily remained and participated in the battle with conspicuous gallantry, although his term of service had expired and he had been ordered home to be mustered out.
