= 1986 Maine gubernatorial election =

- November 4, 1986
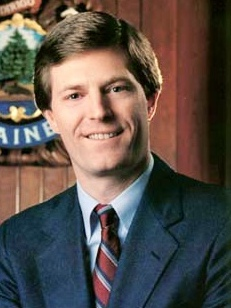

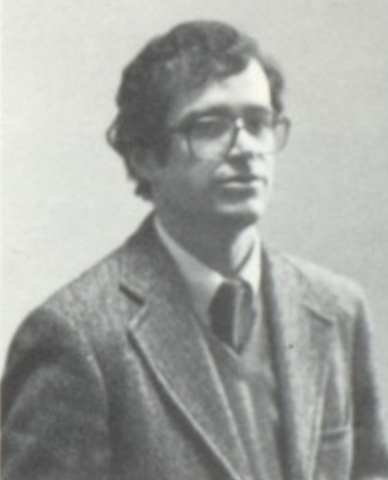
Nominee	John McKernan	James Tierney
Party	Republican	Democratic
Popular vote	170,312	128,744
Percentage	39.90%	30.16%
Nominee	Sherry Huber	John Menario
Party	Independent	Independent
Popular vote	64,317	63,474
Percentage	15.07%	14.87%
- McKernan: 30–40% 40–50% 50–60% 60–70% 70–80% Tierney: 30–40% 40–50% 50–60% 60–70% 70–80% Huber: 40–50% 70–80% Menario: 30–40% Tie: 30–40% 40–50% 50%
Governor before election
Joseph Brennan
Democratic
Elected Governor
John McKernan
Republican

The 1986 Maine gubernatorial election took place on November 4, 1986. Incumbent Democratic Governor Joseph Brennan was term limited and ineligible to seek re-election. First district Congressman John McKernan defeated Democratic Party challenger James Tierney as well as former Republican turned Independent Sherry Huber and former Portland city manager John Menario, making McKernan the first Republican to win The Blaine House since 1962.

Tierney, the sitting state Attorney General, won a crowded Democratic primary over state senators Severin Beliveau and William Diamond, as well as David Redmond, the chief of staff of incumbent governor Joseph Brennan. McKernan faced only conservative activist Porter Leighton in the GOP primary, and dispatched him with relative ease.

The three main issues during the campaign were: the future of the Maine Yankee Nuclear Power Plant in Wiscasset, economic development and McKernan's congressional record.

As Brennan was term-limited and ineligible to seek office, this is the only Maine gubernatorial election between 1974 and 1994 in which he was not a candidate; he was an unsuccessful Democratic primary candidate in 1974, and would be the unsuccessful Democratic nominee in 1990 and 1994.

== Maine Yankee ==
The future of the Maine Yankee nuclear power plant had been placed up for statewide referendum in 1980 and again in 1982. McKernan and Menario opposed the closure of Maine Yankee, while Tierney and Huber supported the efforts to close the plant in 1988.

== Democratic primary ==
=== Candidates ===
- Severin Beliveau, of Augusta, member of the Maine Senate
- William Diamond, of Windham, member of the Maine Senate
- David Redmond, of Portland, Chief of Staff to Governor Joseph E. Brennan
- Joseph Ricci, of Falmouth, founder of the Élan School
- James Tierney, of Lisbon, Attorney General of Maine

=== Results ===
Democratic primary results
Party	Candidate	Votes	%
Democratic	James Tierney	44,087	37.23
Democratic	Severin Beliveau	27,991	23.64
Democratic	William Diamond	24,693	20.85
Democratic	David Redmond	17,598	14.86
Democratic	Joseph Ricci	4,039	3.41
Total votes		118,408	100.00

== Republican primary ==
=== Candidates ===
- Porter D. Leighton, of Harrison, conservative activist
- John McKernan Jr., of Cumberland, U.S. Representative for Maine's 1st congressional district

=== Results ===
Republican primary results
Party	Candidate	Votes	%
Republican	John McKernan	79,393	68.37
Republican	Porter Leighton	24,631	31.61
Republican	Others	31	0.02
Total votes		116,129	100.00

== General election ==
=== Candidates ===
- John McKernan Jr., former U.S. Representative from the 1st congressional district (Republican)
- James Tierney, incumbent Attorney General of Maine (Democratic)
- Sherry Huber, former state representative from Falmouth and Republican candidate for governor in 1982 (Independent)
- John Menario, banker and city administrator (Independent)

=== Results ===
Despite receiving less than 40% of the vote, McKernan outpaced his nearest rival Tierney by nearly ten percentage points. McKernan would also carry 15 of the 16 counties in the state, with Tierney carrying traditionally Democratic Androscoggin County.

Menario and Huber would carry only a handful of municipalities each: Menario would win Hammond by a margin of eight votes to seven for McKernan, six for Tierney, and two for Huber, while Huber would win Glenwood Plantation by a margin of three votes to one for McKernan and none for both Tierney and Menario, and Brighton Plantation by a margin of 12 votes to 11 for Tierney, four for Menario, and two for McKernan.

Additionally, the municipalities of Codyville, Drew, Kingsbury Plantation, and Vanceboro, finished as exact ties for McKernan and Tierney, while Beddington and The Forks finished as exact ties for McKernan and Huber.

1986 Gubernatorial Election, Maine
Party	Candidate	Votes	%	±%
Republican	John R. McKernan Jr.	170,312	39.90%	−
Democratic	James Tierney	128,744	30.16%	−
Independent	Sherry Huber	64,317	15.07%	−
Independent	John Menario	63,474	14.87%	−
Plurality		41,568	9.74%	
Turnout		427,120		
Republican gain from Democratic		Swing		

==== Counties that flipped from Democratic to Republican ====
- Aroostook (largest city: Presque Isle)
- Cumberland (largest city: Portland)
- Franklin (largest town: Farmington)
- Hancock (largest municipality: Ellsworth)
- Kennebec (largest city: Augusta)
- Knox (largest municipality: Rockland)
- Oxford (largest town: Rumford)
- Lincoln (largest city: Waldoboro)
- Penobscot (largest city: Bangor)
- Piscataquis (largest municipality: Dover-Foxcroft)
- Sagadahoc (largest town: Bath)
- Somerset (largest town: Skowhegan)
- Waldo (largest city: Belfast)
- Washington (largest city: Calais)
- York (largest town: Biddeford)
