= Peter Danton =

American politician (1928–2015)

Chief of Staff to the Governor of Maine
- In office October 7, 1985 – January 1987
- Governor: Joseph E. Brennan
- Preceded by: David Redmond
- Succeeded by: Sharon Miller

Member of the Maine Senate
- In office December 1982 – October 4, 1985
- Preceded by: John M. Kerry
- Succeeded by: David Kerry
- Constituency: 4th district (1982‍–‍1984); 31st district (1984‍–‍1985)
- In office December 1970 – December 1980
- Preceded by: Raymond Letourneau
- Succeeded by: John M. Kerry
- Constituency: 3rd district (1970‍–‍1972); 4th district (1972‍–‍1980)

Personal details
- Born: Peter William Daoutakos; July 11, 1928 Biddeford, Maine, U.S.
- Died: March 16, 2015 (aged 86) Biddeford, Maine, U.S.
- Party: Democratic
- Education: University of Maine at Augusta (BS)

Military service
- Branch/service: United States Army
- Battles/wars: Korean War

Peter William Danton (July 11, 1928 – March 16, 2015) was an American politician who served as a member of the Maine Senate. During his seventh term, Danton resigned from the body, effective October 4, 1985, to accept an appointment as chief of staff to Governor Joseph E. Brennan.

Maine Senate
Preceded by John M. Kerry	Member of the Maine Senate; 1982–1985	Succeeded by David Kerry
Political offices
Preceded by David Redmond	Chief of Staff to the Governor of Maine; 1985–1987	Succeeded by Sharon Miller
