= Sidney St. Felix Thaxter =

American judge (1883–1958)

Sidney St. Felix Thaxter (March 4, 1883 – June 30, 1958), of Portland, Maine, was a justice of the Maine Supreme Judicial Court from September 16, 1930 to February 28, 1954. His father was Sidney W. Thaxter, an American Civil War Medal of Honor recipient, and his daughter was actress Phyllis Thaxter.

He attended Portland High School before he graduated from Harvard College and Harvard Law School. He was a classmate of Franklin D. Roosevelt while an undergrad. He was an associate editor of the Harvard Law Review. After passing the bar, he was a lawyer in private practice before becoming a recorder in Portland.

He was nominated to the Maine Superior Court on January 1, 1930 and nominated to the state Supreme Court bench later that same year, both by Governor William Tudor Gardiner.

Political offices
Preceded by Norman L. Bassett	Justice of the Maine Supreme Judicial Court; 1930–1954	Succeeded by Albert Beliveau
