= Back River (Jamaica) =

Black River (Jamaica)

Location
- Country: Jamaica

Physical characteristics
- Source
  - coordinates: 18.1892578°N 77.6826954°W
- Mouth
  - coordinates: 18.0214663°N 77.8469753°W

The Black River (Jamaica) is a river of Jamaica, located in St. Elizabeth.

== See also ==
- List of rivers of Jamaica
