= Richard S. Cohen =

American lawyer and politician

United States Attorney for the District of Maine
- In office 1981–1993
- President: Ronald Reagan; George H. W. Bush; Bill Clinton
- Preceded by: Thomas E. Delahanty II
- Succeeded by: Jay P. McCloskey

50th Attorney General of Maine
- In office 1979–1981
- Governor: Joseph E. Brennan
- Preceded by: Joseph E. Brennan
- Succeeded by: James Tierney

Personal details
- Born: Richard Stockman Cohen; April 5, 1937 Boston, Massachusetts, U.S.
- Died: April 13, 1998 (aged 61) New York, New York, U.S.
- Party: Republican
- Education: University of Georgia (BA); Boston University (LLB)
- Occupation: Lawyer; politician

Richard Stockman Cohen (April 5, 1937 – April 13, 1998) was an American lawyer from Maine. Cohen, a Republican, was a career prosecutor and served as Maine Attorney General from 1978 to 1981. The Maine Attorney General is elected by the Maine Legislature.

Cohen grew up in Brookline, Massachusetts and graduated from the University of Georgia undergraduate and Boston University School of Law before taking the position of counsel to the bureau of taxation in the Maine Attorney General's office. Among his accomplishments, Cohen helped negotiate the Maine Indian Claims Settlement Act during his time in office. He also "revolutionized" the Attorney General's office, creating the Maine Criminal Justice Academy and introducing other reforms. After the Democratic Party won back the Legislature in 1980, Cohen was replaced by James Tierney. However, newly elected President Ronald Reagan appointed Cohen as a U.S. attorney. After finishing his 12-year term, Cohen became private counsel to the Passamaquoddy Tribe. Cohen became ill in 1997 and died at Mount Sinai Hospital in New York City after suffering from Crohn's disease.

Legal offices
Preceded by Joseph E. Brennan	Maine Attorney General; 1979–1981	Succeeded by James E. Tierney
