= John Menario =

American banker and city administrator (born 1935)

- Born: September 18, 1935; Portland, Maine, United States
- Died: January 31, 2019 (aged 83)
- Occupation(s): Banker and city administrator
- Years active: 1967- 1976

John Menario (September 18, 1935 – January 31, 2019) was an American banker and city administrator.

== Personal and early life ==
Menario was born in Portland, Maine on September 18, 1935, to Gladys and Michael Menario. The family moved to neighboring Falmouth, Maine, where Menario studied in Falmouth public schools from grades 7–12. He graduated from Falmouth High School. He served in the U.S. army during the end of the Korean War. After leaving the army, Menario returned to Maine, where he studied public management at the University of Maine. He earned a M.A. from the Fels Institute of Government at the University of Pennsylvania.

Menario began working for the City of Portland as assistant to the City Manager in 1962. Thereafter, he was finance director for the City and, in 1966, he became City Manager. During his time as City Manager, Menario oversaw significant urban renewal of Portland's downtown neighborhoods, including the razing of Portland's Little Italy neighborhood in favor of Franklin Street arterial. He led Portland into the Model Cities Program. After leaving the position of City Manager, Menario worked for the Portland Chamber Commerce, led two campaigns to save Maine Yankee Nuclear Power Plant, which faced two citizen referendums seeking its closure. In 1986, Menario ran for Governor of Maine as an unenrolled (independent). His campaign focused on the need to keep Maine Yankee open. He finished in 4th and final place, receiving 14.9% of the vote.

After running for Governor, Menario was hired as CEO of Peoples Heritage Bank in Portland.
