= Edward P. Murray =

American judge (1876–1966)

Edward Patrick Murray (April 7, 1876 – January 22, 1966) was a justice on the Maine Supreme Judicial Court, from September 18, 1947, to April 6, 1948. He was a Roman Catholic, and his great nephews include Fr. Frank J. Murray and Robert Murray.

A resident of Bangor, Maine, Murray was appointed to the court by Governor Horace Hildreth, and served until his retirement. Upon his death, the Maine Legislature noted that he had been an active member of the legal profession in Maine for over 64 years, and described him as "famed for his legal ability and courtroom wit".

Political offices
Preceded by James H. Hudson	Justice of the Maine Supreme Judicial Court; 1947–1948	Succeeded by Edward F. Merrill
