= Falmouth High School (Maine) =

School in Falmouth, Maine, United States

Location
- 74 Woodville Road; Falmouth, Maine, (Cumberland County) 04105; United States

Information
- Motto: Fear the Wheel
- Established: 1930
- School district: Falmouth Schools
- Superintendent: Steve Nolan
- Principal: Dr. David Conrady
- Teaching staff: 66.90 (FTE)
- Grades: 9–12
- Enrollment: 698 (2023–2024)
- Student to teacher ratio: 10.43
- Colors: Blue, white & gold
- Team name: Yachtsmen (1950-2021); Navigators (2021-)
- Rival: Greely High School; Cape Elizabeth High School Biddeford High School
- Yearbook: The Crest
- Website: fhs.falmouthschools.org

Falmouth High School is a public high school located in the town of Falmouth, Maine, in the United States. The school serves roughly 680 students in grades 9–12. Located on the Woodville Road Campus, the current Falmouth High School was completed in 2001, and opened for the 2001–2002 school year. Previously the school was shared with Falmouth Middle School, and from 1930 to 1955 was in the Plummer-Motz building located on the corner of Middle and Lunt Roads. Falmouth High School is located near the geographic center of town, and is abutted by Falmouth's community park. The school's athletic teams were called the "Yachtsmen" (1950–2021), but the long-lived school mascot was replaced by the "Navigators" (2021–). The school colors are blue and gold with white as secondary.

In November 2008, the citizens of Falmouth rejected a reorganization plan to consolidate with the nearby district of SAD 51, which comprises Cumberland, Maine, and North Yarmouth, Maine. Falmouth has since filed and had approved an alternative reorganization plan allowing it to remain an independent district.

== School name and mascot ==
In 1948, the name "Yachtsmen" was used in a Portland Press Herald article to unofficially name the FHS students. The name began appearing in yearbooks in 1950 and became the name for the sports teams. The team nickname also had a mascot, Yachtie who was an angry, bearded yachtsman who would occasionally appear at games. In 2021, a survey was sent to students and staff asking about the popularity of the school's name and logo. The survey found that 21.5% of students "liked or loved" the nickname and 78.5% disliked or were indifferent to it, some students calling the name "uninclusive". The school board decided that the name would change for the 2021–2022 school year. The school considered many names (e.g. Riptide, Kraken, Vikings) but, in the final vote, "Navigators" was voted to replace "Yachtsmen". The sports teams are now known as the Falmouth Navigators/NAVS. The school has not announced a replacement for "Yachtie".

== Sports ==
The Falmouth High School Navigators are currently members of the Southwestern Maine Activities Association (SMAA), in the class A division. There are 26 sports teams at Falmouth High School. Fall sports include Cross Country, Field Hockey, Football, Golf, Soccer (Girls), Soccer (Boys), and Volleyball. Winter Sports include Alpine skiing, Basketball (Girls), Basketball (Boys), Ice Hockey (Girls), Ice Hockey (Boys), Indoor Track, Nordic Skiing, Swimming and Diving, and Wrestling. Spring sports include Baseball, Lacrosse (Girls), Lacrosse (Boys), Softball, Tennis (Girls), Tennis (Boys), Track and Field, Volleyball (Boys).

== Clubs and Activities ==
Astronomy Club, Bake Sale Club, Banned Book Club, Best Buddies, Biology Olympiad, Book Club, Chess Club, Civics Club, Civil Rights Team, Class (Executive) Boards, CodeX2, Cookies For A Cause, DECA, Diverse Student Union (DSU), Dungeon & Dragons (DND), Food For Thought, F.R.O.G.S. (Falmouth Rainbow Organization of Gender and Sexuality), Future Business Leaders of America (FBLA), GORP, Knitting and Crocheting Club, Life Sciences Club, Makers Club, The MAST, Math Team, Model UN (MUN), National Honor Society (NHS), Navs Media, Northern Force Robotics, Ocean Bowl, Outing Club, Poetry Club, Prom Committee, Rock Climbing League, Science Bowl, Science Olympiad, Service Club, Spanish National Honor Society (Sociedad Honoraria Hispanica), Speech and Debate, STEM Mentorship, Stock Market Club, Student Ambassadors, Student-Athlete Mental Health Committee, Student Council, Student Led Change, Tri-M Music Honors Society, Unified Club, Yearbook Club, Yellow Tulip Project (YTP), Youth Maine Climate Activists (YMCA)

== Robotics ==
Falmouth High School is a member of the Robotics team Northern Force Team 172, along with Gorham High School. Falmouth offers a competitive robotics team for students in grades 9–12, where members take part in the FIRST Robotics Competition. This nationwide program brings together students and professional mentors to tackle complex engineering challenges in a fast-paced, team-based environment.

== Notable alumni ==
- Gabe Hoffman-Johnson, soccer player and Founder of the Portland Hearts of Pine
- Roger Levesque, Major League Soccer player
- John Menario, banker and city administrator
