= Back River (Kennebec River tributary) =

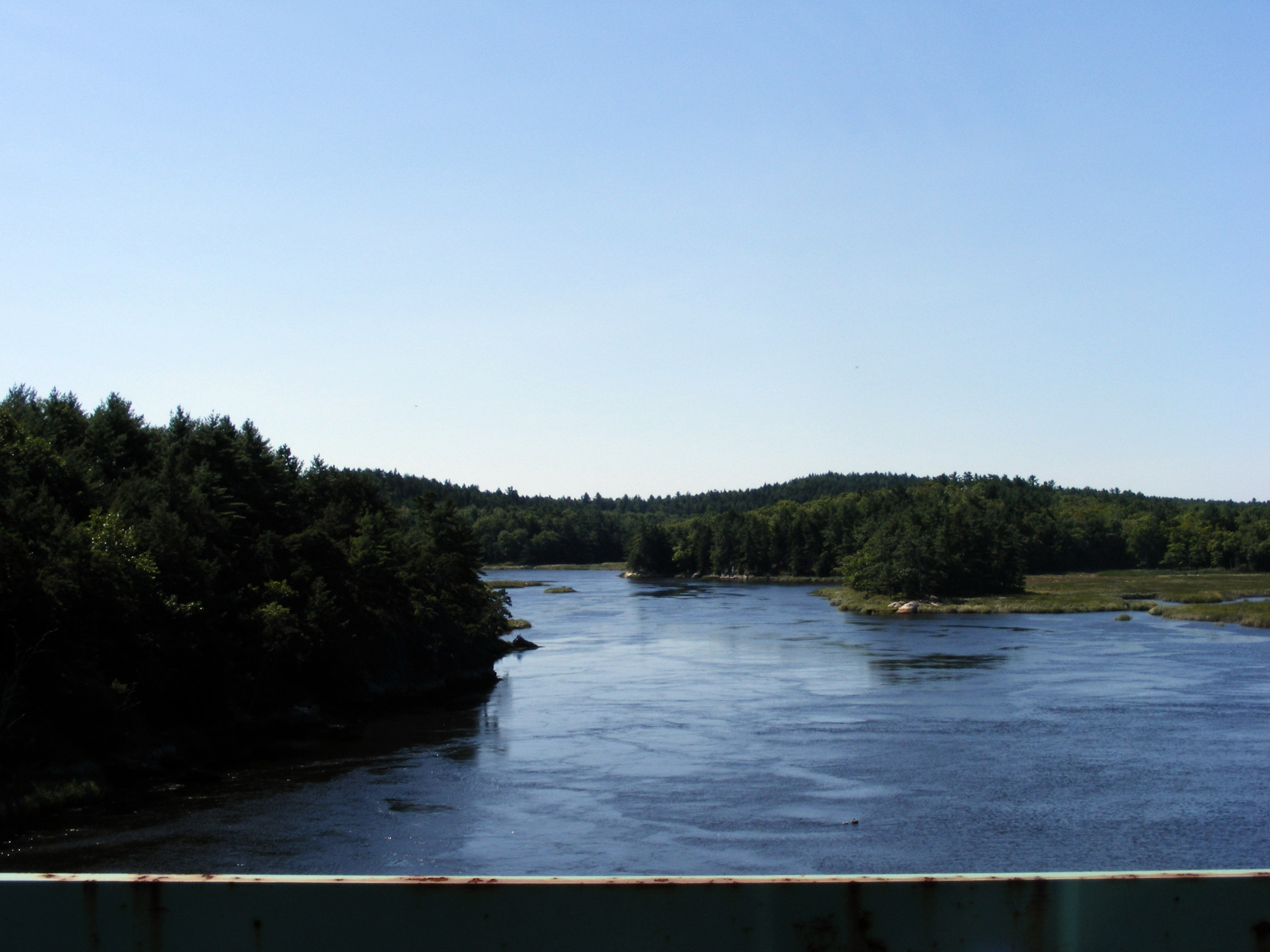
- Back River as seen from the Route 127 bridge near Arrowsic

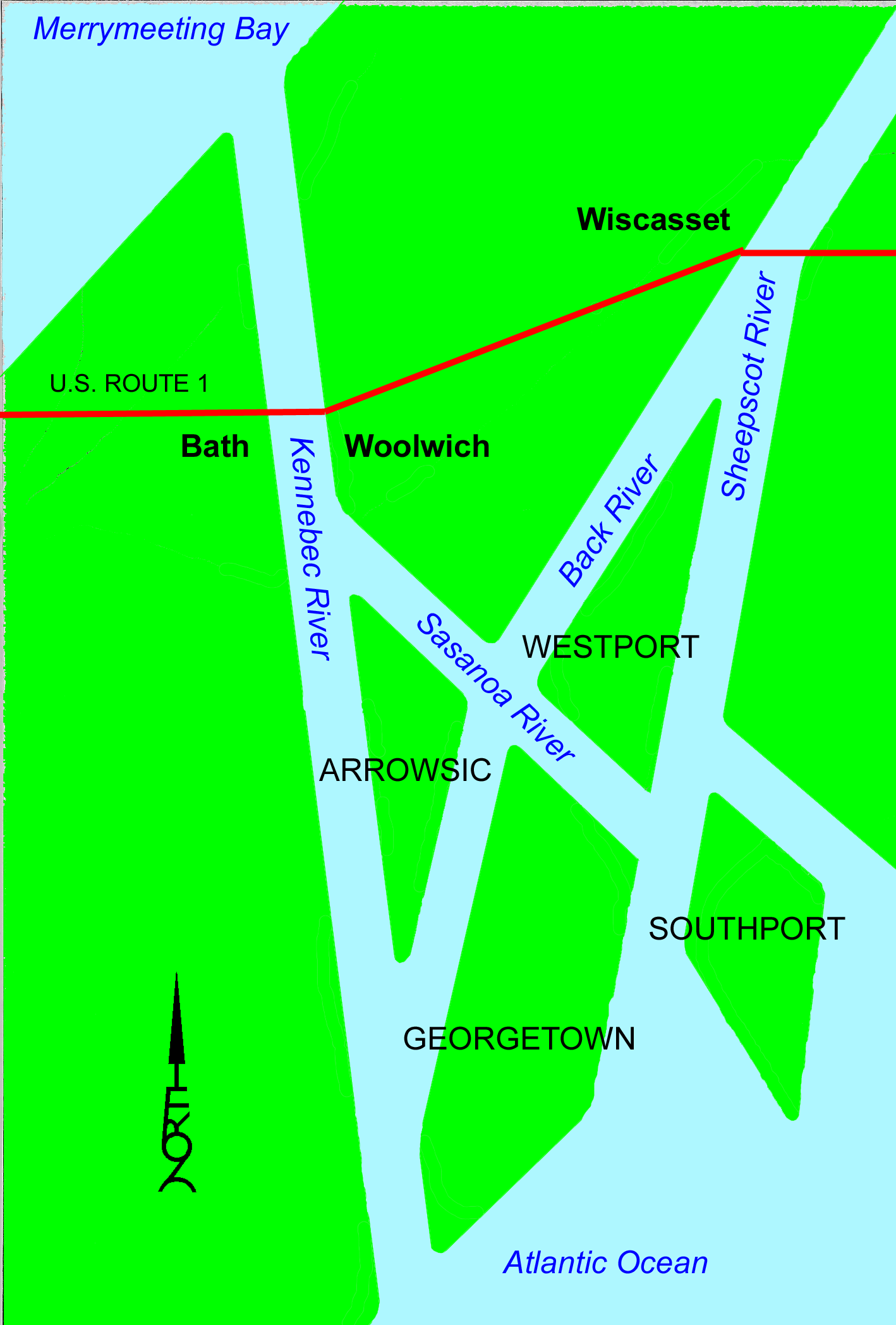

Physical characteristics
- Source
  - location: Wiscasset, Maine
  - coordinates: 43°59′35″N 69°39′51″W
- Mouth
  - location: Georgetown, Maine
  - coordinates: 43°48′10″N 69°47′0″W
  - elevation: 0 m (0 ft)
- Length: 16 miles (26 km)

Basin features
- River system: Kennebec - Sheepscot

The Back River is a 16-mile-long (26 km) waterway in coastal Maine, USA, in the combined estuary of the Sheepscot and the Kennebec rivers. The Back River runs from Wiscasset on the Sheepscot to Georgetown on the Kennebec, intersecting another channel, the Sasanoa River, at Hockomock Bay.

Maine State Route 144 bridges the northern section of the Back River from Wiscasset to Westport Island. Maine Route 127 bridges the narrow southern part at Arrowsic, from Arrowsic Island to Georgetown Island.

The site of the decommissioned Maine Yankee Nuclear Power Plant is on the northern section.

Approximately 4 miles (6.4 km) south of where the river begins at the Sheepscot River, another waterway called Back River connects with the Sheepscot River.

== See also ==
- List of rivers of Maine
