= Maine State Route 144 =

State highway in Lincoln County, Maine, US

State Route 144

Route information
- Maintained by MaineDOT
- Length: 8.33 mi (13.41 km)
- Existed: 1954–present

Major junctions
- South end: West Shore Road in Westport Island
- North end: US 1 in Wiscasset

Location
- Country: United States
- State: Maine
- Counties: Lincoln

Highway system
- Maine State Highway System; Interstate; US; State; Auto trails; Lettered highways
← SR 143	→ SR 145

State Route 144 (SR 144) is part of Maine's system of numbered state highways, located in Lincoln County along the state's southern coast. The southern terminus is at West Shore Road in Westport Island and the northern terminus is at U.S. Route 1 (US 1) in Wiscasset.

Although the route is signed north-south to reflect its general orientation, the route has an irregular alignment in Wiscasset due to the location of the Westport Bridge crossing over the Back River. Heading "north," the route runs northeast, west, southwest, then turns northwest to its northern terminus.

== Route description ==
SR 144 begins at the intersection of West Shore Road and Main Road in Westport Island. No signage for SR 144 is present at this location but state-aid maintenance begins at this point. The route heads north along the ridge of the island through a mostly wooded area. Many small houses line the road through the island portion. The road also passes a fire department and a church. After about 5 miles (8.0 km), the road curves to the west and crosses the Back River at the Cowsegan Narrows, entering the town of Wiscasset. SR 144 climbs Cushman Hill and comes to a T-intersection with Birch Point Road. Route signage begins at this point and SR 144 turns to the southwest heading through a cleared area lined with houses. At Ready Point Road and Old Ferry Road (near the site of the former Maine Yankee Nuclear Power Plant), SR 144 turns to the northwest and passes the side of Wiscasset Airport, crosses a railroad, and ends at US 1 adjacent to a used car dealership.

== History ==
State Route 144
- Location: Rangeley-Anson
- Length: 64.19 mi (103.30 km)
- Existed: 1925–1933

Since the modern state highway system was adopted in 1925, there have been three different routes designated as SR 144.

The original SR 144 designated in 1925 was an east-west highway that ran between Rangeley and North Anson. Its western terminus was at former SR 107, located at the modern intersection of SR 4 and SR 16 near the town center. From there, it ran northeast to Eustis, then turned southeast, passing through Kingfield and New Portland and into Anson, with its eastern terminus located at New England Route 20 (which became US 201 in 1926 and is now US 201A). In 1931, the route was truncated back to Eustis, with its segment west to Rangeley becoming part of the newly designated SR 4. The remainder of the route was decommissioned in 1933 when the newly designated SR 16 was routed over it.

State Route 144
- Location: Rangeley
- Length: 1.51 mi (2.43 km)
- Existed: 1936–1951

In 1937-38, the original routing of SR 16 was changed and removed from the short extension to Haines Landing that had originally been part of former SR 107. The SR 144 designation was applied to this short stretch of highway, running from Haines Landing to junction with SR 4 and SR 16 in the town center of Rangeley. This routing persisted until 1951, when SR 4 was re-routed along SR 16 in Rangeley and onto the Haines Landing extension, which remains its routing today.

The modern alignment of SR 144 in Westport Island and Wiscasset was designated in 1954.

== Major junctions ==
In the state highway log, mileposts on SR 144 begin at zero at US 1 and increase from north to south.
The entire route is in Lincoln County.

Location	mi	km	Destinations	Notes
Westport Island	8.33	13.41	Main Road / West Shore Road	Southern terminus
Wiscasset	0.00	0.00	US 1 (Bath Road) – Bath, Wiscasset	Northern terminus
1.000 mi = 1.609 km; 1.000 km = 0.621 mi
