= Sherry Huber =

American politician and environmentalist (1937–2022)

Member of the Maine House of Representatives
- In office 1976–1982

Personal details
- Born: September 27, 1937 New York City, U.S.
- Died: June 4, 2022 (aged 84) Falmouth, Maine, U.S.
- Party: Independent (1986–2022)
- Other political affiliations: Republican (before 1986)
- Profession: Environmentalist

Sherry F. Huber (September 27, 1937 – June 4, 2022) was an American politician and environmentalist. Huber, a resident of Falmouth, Maine, was a Republican member of the Maine House of Representatives from 1976 to 1982. Considered a moderate, Huber focused much of her time in the legislature on energy issues. In 1982, Huber ran for Governor of Maine, finishing second in the Republican primary behind Charles Cragin. She became the first woman ever to run in the Republican Party for Governor of Maine while, in the same election, Rep. Georgette Berube challenged incumbent Democrat Joseph Brennan. Huber ran unenrolled in 1986, finishing third with 15.7%. During the 1986 election, Huber was unanimously endorsed by the Maine Lesbian-Gay Political Alliance. In 2008, Huber was named as a notable Republican supporter of Democratic presidential candidate Barack Obama. She has been the long-time Executive Director of the Maine Timber Research and Environmental Education Foundation (Maine TREE).
