= James Tierney (attorney) =

American lawyer and politician

James E. Tierney
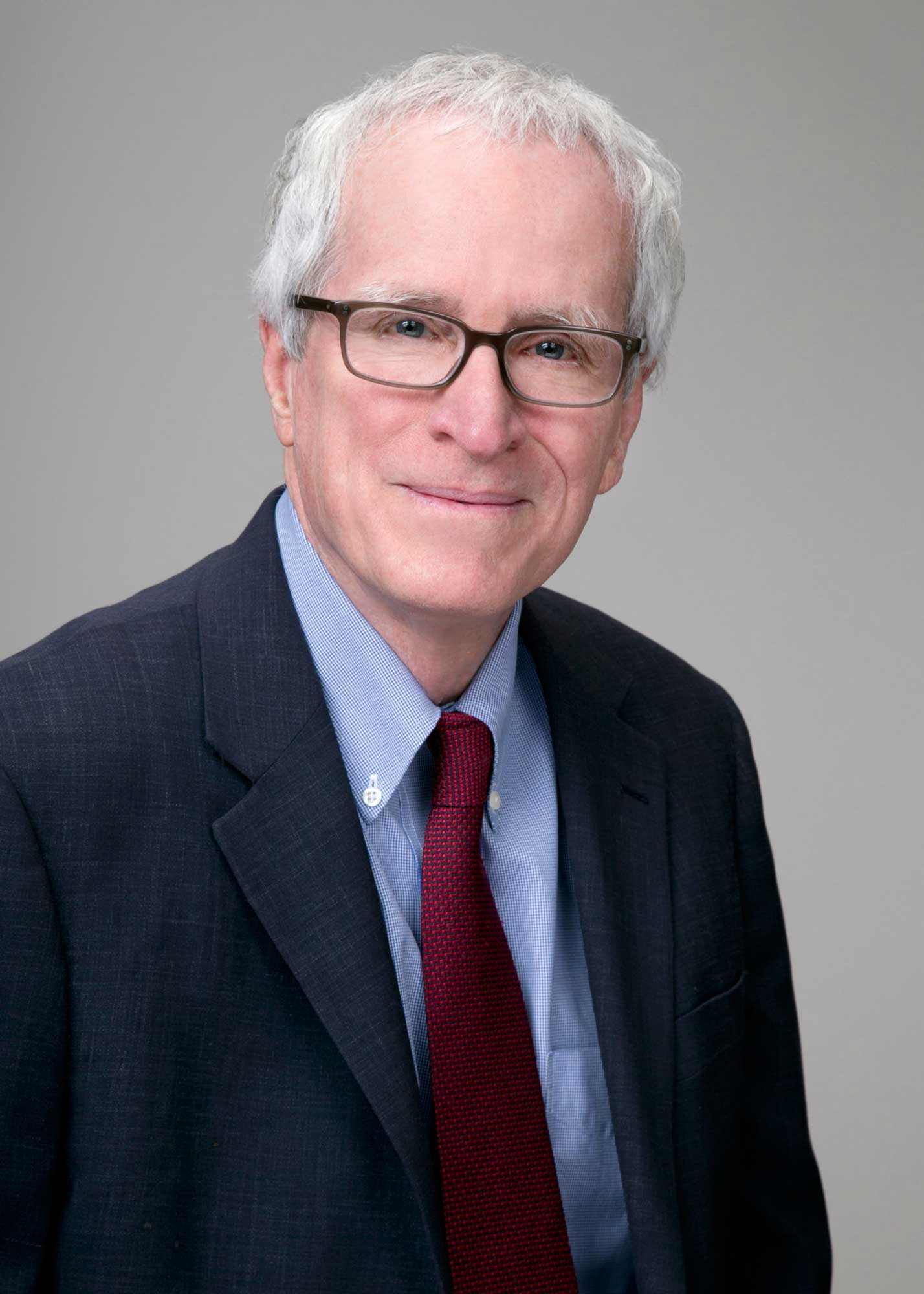

51st Attorney General of Maine
- In office January 6, 1981 – January 6, 1991
- Governor: Joseph E. Brennan; John R. McKernan Jr.
- Preceded by: Richard S. Cohen
- Succeeded by: Michael E. Carpenter

Member of the Maine House of Representatives
- In office January 3, 1973 – December 3, 1980
- Succeeded by: Martin S. Hayden
- Constituency: Androscoggin County (1973-1975); 3rd District (1975-1980)

Personal details
- Born: April 12, 1947 (age 79) New York City, New York, U.S.
- Party: Democratic
- Spouse: Elizabeth Strout
- Education: University of Maine, Orono (BA); University of Maine School of Law (JD)
- Profession: Professor, Lawyer

James E. Tierney (born April 12, 1947) is an American lawyer, lecturer in law at Harvard Law School, and founding director of State AG, an educational resource on the office of state attorney general. He served as Attorney General of Maine from 1980 until 1990.

At 25, Tierney was elected to the Maine House of Representatives as a Democrat from Lisbon, Maine. After eight years in the Maine Legislature, where he was elected Majority Leader at the age of 29, Tierney became the Maine Attorney General. He served in that capacity for ten years during which time he was active on a wide variety of state and national issues.

In 1986, Tierney ran for Governor of Maine. He won a crowded Democratic primary, and advanced to the general election against Republican nominee John R. McKernan Jr.. Tierney lost by over 40,000 votes in a four-way race featuring two independents receiving over 15% of the vote each. After leaving office of Attorney General in 1990, he began a career as a consultant to attorneys general.

In December 1992, he was named as special attorney general to investigate misconduct allegations on the Pennsylvania Supreme Court. Tierney has been characterized by state attorneys general and the media as "America's 51st Attorney General."

From 2000 to 2016, Tierney was the Director of the National State Attorneys General Program at Columbia Law School. In 2006, Columbia students recognized him as the Public Interest Law Professor of the Year. Since 2016, he has been a lecturer in law at Harvard Law School where he teaches on the role of state attorneys general while directing the Harvard Attorney General clinic. He has written extensively on a wide range of topics, such as the often volatile relationship between state AGs and their governors.

Tierney is quoted widely on the operations of the office of state attorney general. He is a frequent speaker at meetings of the National Association of Attorneys General (NAAG). Tierney has been a regular commentator on Court TV (TruTV) since its founding in 1991. In that capacity, he has commented on a wide range of trials from the celebrated cases of the early 1990s to the recent military tribunals in Guantanamo Bay.

Tierney may be best known as one of the key strategists in the state cases against the tobacco industry in reclaiming Medicaid payments paid out for tobacco-related disease.

Tierney also has advised officials in Eastern Europe's emerging democracies, has supervised national elections in Bulgaria, Cameroon, Croatia and Albania, and was special counsel in the investigation of alleged corruption within the Pennsylvania Supreme Court.

Tierney, a graduate of the University of Maine School of Law, married Maine author Elizabeth Strout in 2011.

Party political offices
| Preceded by Joseph E. Brennan | Democratic nominee for Governor of Maine; 1986 | Succeeded by Joseph E. Brennan |
Legal offices
| Preceded by Richard S. Cohen | Maine Attorney General; 1981–1991 | Succeeded by Michael E. Carpenter |
