= Westport Island, Maine =

Town in Maine, United States

- Town
- Seal

- Location in Lincoln County and the state of Maine
- Coordinates: 43°53′45″N 69°42′23″W
- Country: United States
- State: Maine
- County: Lincoln
- Incorporated: 1828

Area
  - Total: 14.24 sq mi (36.88 km^{2})
  - Land: 8.81 sq mi (22.82 km^{2})
  - Water: 5.43 sq mi (14.06 km^{2})
- Elevation: 95 ft (29 m)

Population (2020)
  - Total: 719
  - Density: 82/sq mi (31.5/km^{2})
- Time zone: UTC-5 (Eastern (EST))
  - Summer (DST): UTC-4 (EDT)
- ZIP code: 04578
- Area code: 207
- FIPS code: 23-84135
- GNIS feature ID: 582810
- Website: www.westportisland.gov

Westport Island, formerly Westport, is a town in Lincoln County, Maine, United States. In the 19th century the island was known as Jeremysquam, a nickname islanders still use for it. The population was 719 at the 2020 census.

== History ==
The town was part of Edgecomb before being separately incorporated in 1828.

== Geography ==
Westport Island is located approximately 30 miles (48 km) northeast of Portland. The island is separated from the mainland by two coastal salt-water rivers: the Sheepscot River and the Back River. The island is connected to the mainland at the northwest by one modern bridge, built in 1972 over a slim gap in the Back River called Cowsegan Narrows. Although completely surrounded by water, it is bounded across tidal water by the towns of Wiscasset, Edgecomb, Southport, and Georgetown.

According to the United States Census Bureau, the town has a total area of 14.24 square miles (36.88 km^{2}), of which 8.81 square miles (22.82 km^{2}) is land and 5.43 square miles (14.06 km^{2}) is water.

=== Climate ===
Climate data for Westport Island, Maine, 1991–2020 normals, extremes 2002–2013
Month	Jan	Feb	Mar	Apr	May	Jun	Jul	Aug	Sep	Oct	Nov	Dec	Year
Record high °F (°C)	59 (15)	54 (12)	79 (26)	81 (27)	91 (33)	91 (33)	96 (36)	91 (33)	93 (34)	78 (26)	67 (19)	62 (17)	96 (36)
Mean daily maximum °F (°C)	31.0 (−0.6)	33.3 (0.7)	40.5 (4.7)	51.4 (10.8)	62.5 (16.9)	70.1 (21.2)	76.3 (24.6)	75.9 (24.4)	69.2 (20.7)	57.8 (14.3)	47.3 (8.5)	36.9 (2.7)	54.4 (12.4)
Daily mean °F (°C)	22.7 (−5.2)	24.6 (−4.1)	32.4 (0.2)	42.9 (6.1)	53.3 (11.8)	61.7 (16.5)	67.8 (19.9)	67.2 (19.6)	60.3 (15.7)	49.7 (9.8)	39.8 (4.3)	29.3 (−1.5)	46.0 (7.8)
Mean daily minimum °F (°C)	14.3 (−9.8)	15.9 (−8.9)	24.3 (−4.3)	34.3 (1.3)	44.1 (6.7)	53.4 (11.9)	59.2 (15.1)	58.6 (14.8)	51.4 (10.8)	41.7 (5.4)	32.3 (0.2)	21.8 (−5.7)	37.6 (3.1)
Record low °F (°C)	−13 (−25)	−16 (−27)	−5 (−21)	18 (−8)	28 (−2)	38 (3)	48 (9)	43 (6)	33 (1)	24 (−4)	12 (−11)	−2 (−19)	−16 (−27)
Average precipitation inches (mm)	4.37 (111)	3.91 (99)	4.92 (125)	4.33 (110)	3.60 (91)	4.43 (113)	3.69 (94)	3.24 (82)	4.32 (110)	5.17 (131)	4.35 (110)	5.39 (137)	51.72 (1,313)
Average precipitation days (≥ 0.01 in)	12.5	10.1	11.2	11.8	14.7	15.7	12.3	11.7	9.0	13.8	12.5	12.8	148.1
Source 1: NOAA
Source 2: XMACIS2

== Demographics ==
Historical population
Census	Pop.	Note	%±
1830	554		—
1840	655		18.2%
1850	761		16.2%
1860	798		4.9%
1870	699		−12.4%
1880	612		−12.4%
1890	451		−26.3%
1900	330		−26.8%
1910	284		−13.9%
1920	165		−41.9%
1930	108		−34.5%
1940	111		2.8%
1950	146		31.5%
1960	133		−8.9%
1970	228		71.4%
1980	420		84.2%
1990	663		57.9%
2000	745		12.4%
2010	718		−3.6%
2020	719		0.1%
U.S. Decennial Census

=== 2020 census ===
As of the census of 2020, there were 719 people, and 378 households in the town. The population density was 81.6 persons per square mile (31.5 per square kilometer). There were 540 housing units at an average density of 61.3 per square mile (23.66 per square kilometer).

There were 378 households, of which 16.4% had children under the age of 18 living with them. 57.1% of households have one or more person 60 years or older. 56.1% of households were married-couple households, 26.5% were male householders with no spouse present, and 12.7% were female householders with no spouse present. The average family size is 2.49 persons per house.

Median Household Income was $73,594, and the poverty rate was 4%. 39.8% of residents hold a bachelor's degree or higher, while 91.4% have a high school degree or higher.

The median age of Westport Island was 51.7 years. 10.1% was under the age of 18, with 11.5% were between the ages of 18 and 24, and 34.7% were over 65 or older. .

=== 2010 census ===
As of the census of 2010, there were 718 people, 329 households, and 227 families living in the town. The population density was 81.5 inhabitants per square mile (31.5/km^{2}). There were 535 housing units at an average density of 60.7 per square mile (23.4/km^{2}). The racial makeup of the town was 97.8% White, 0.1% African American, 0.3% Native American, 0.3% Asian, 0.4% from other races, and 1.1% from two or more races. Hispanic or Latino of any race were 1.0% of the population.

There were 329 households, of which 21.0% had children under the age of 18 living with them, 57.4% were married couples living together, 6.7% had a female householder with no husband present, 4.9% had a male householder with no wife present, and 31.0% were non-families. 23.1% of all households were made up of individuals, and 9.4% had someone living alone who was 65 years of age or older. The average household size was 2.18 and the average family size was 2.48.

The median age in the town was 52 years. 15.2% of residents were under the age of 18; 4% were between the ages of 18 and 24; 20% were from 25 to 44; 36.9% were from 45 to 64; and 24% were 65 years of age or older. The gender makeup of the town was 49.9% male and 50.1% female.

== Economics ==
Fishing is a principal employer for residents of Westport Island, as is the case with much of coastal Maine. Fishermen are most commonly involved in the trapping of lobster and crabs for sale in the local fish markets. Other resources gathered include groundfish, scallops, shrimp, clams, mussels, quahogs, and bloodworms. Other local employers include the Bath Iron Works, a large shipyard where Aegis-class destroyers are built for the US Navy. Many local residents are also involved in cottage industry and building construction services for other town residents.

The median household income is $73,594 and the median family income is $75,139. Approximately 4% of the population lives under the poverty line.
